= Uniforms of the British Army =

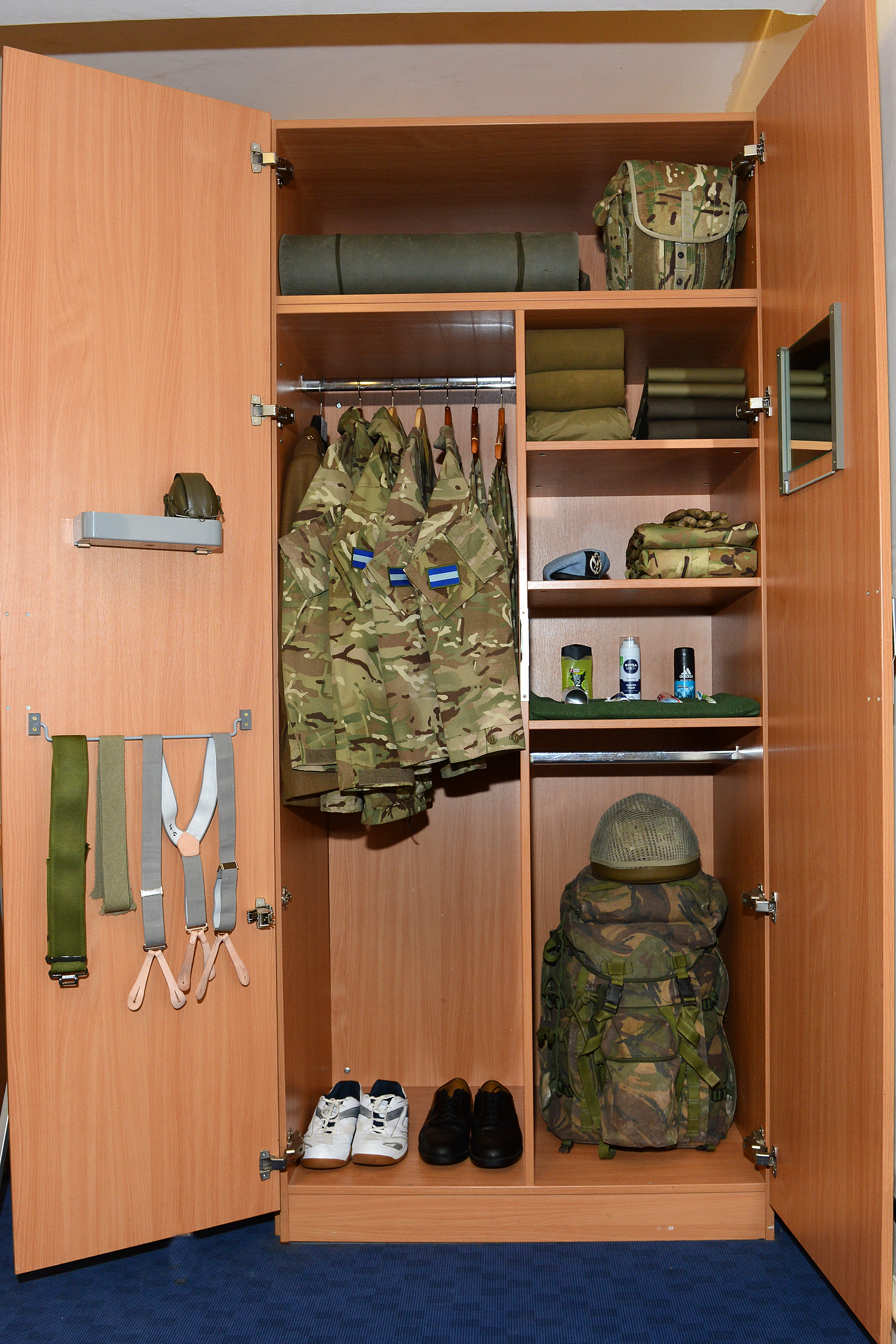
A soldier's kit locker containing general-issue uniform (Army Air Corps).

The uniforms of the British Army currently exist in twelve categories ranging from ceremonial uniforms to combat dress, with full dress uniform and frock coats listed in addition. Uniforms in the British Army are specific to the regiment or corps to which a soldier belongs. Full dress presents the most differentiation between units. There are fewer regimental distinctions between ceremonial dress, service dress, barrack dress and combat dress, though a level of regimental distinction runs throughout.

Senior officers, of full colonel rank and above, do not wear a regimental uniform, except when serving in the honorary position of a Colonel of the Regiment. They wear their own "staff uniform", which includes a coloured cap band and matching gorget patches in several orders of dress.

As a rule, the same basic design and colour of uniform is worn by all ranks of the same regiment, albeit often with increased embellishment for higher ranks. There are several significant uniform differences between infantry and cavalry regiments. Several features of cavalry uniform were and are extended to those corps and regiments deemed for historical reasons to have "mounted status", namely: the Royal Artillery, Royal Engineers, Royal Corps of Signals, Army Air Corps, Royal Logistic Corps and Royal Army Veterinary Corps.

== Full dress ==
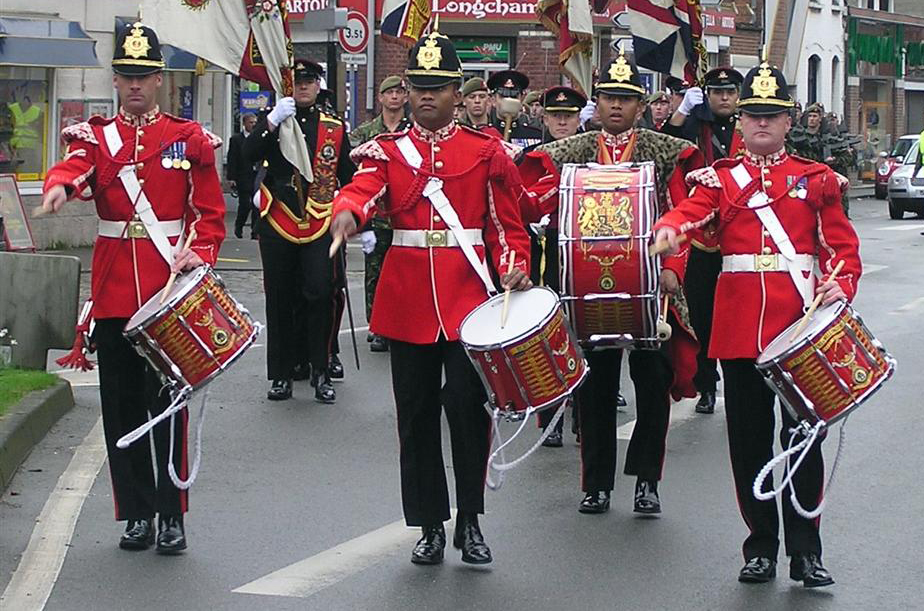
Line infantry full dress, Duke of Wellington's Regiment: Regimental Drummers scarlet full dress tunic of pre–World War I pattern, Home Service helmet of 1878.

Full dress is the most elaborate and traditional order worn by the British Army. It generally consists of a scarlet, dark blue or rifle green high-necked tunic (without chest pockets), elaborate headwear and other colourful items. It was withdrawn from a general issue in 1914, but is still listed in the Army Dress Regulations, which speaks of it as "the ultimate statement of tradition and regimental identity in uniform" and the "key" to all other orders of dress. Each regiment and corps has its own pattern, approved by the Army Dress Committee. They are generally a modified version of the pre-1914 uniforms. In the case of units created since the First World War, such as the Army Air Corps, the full dress order incorporates both traditional and modern elements. Gloves as worn with full dress uniform are white for all ranks in all regiments and corps, with the exception of The Rifles, the Royal Gurkha Rifles, the Royal Army Chaplains' Department, and the Royal Irish Regiment, who all wear black gloves in full dress. This is also the case with the Frock Coat and Numbers 1 and 3 dress. In addition, the Life Guards, the Blues and Royals, the Queens Royal Dragoons, the Royal Scots Dragoon Guards, the Royal Dragoon Guards, and the Royal Lancers all wear white leather gauntlets when mounted.

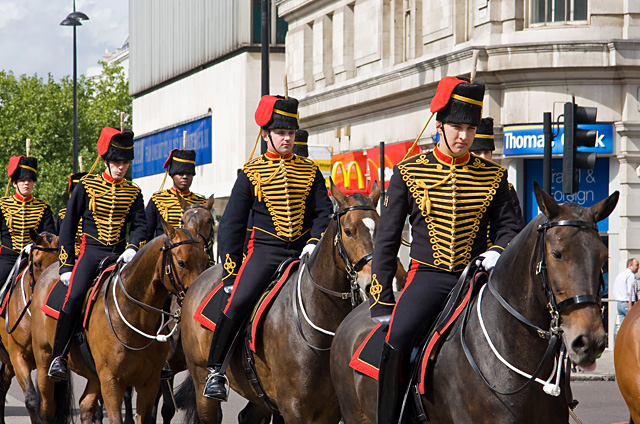
Troopers of the King's Troop, Royal Horse Artillery in their blue light cavalry-style full dress uniform

Full dress is still regularly worn on ceremonial occasions by the Foot Guards, the Household Cavalry and the King's Troop, Royal Horse Artillery. It is issued at public expense to these units and to the various Royal Corps of Army Music Bands for ceremonial use. Other units may obtain full dress on occasion, as it can be worn whenever a parade is attended or ordained by the monarch or a member of the British royal family, including ceremonial parades, state funerals, and public duties around royal residences (such as the Changing of the Guard), or participating in the Lord Mayor's Show.

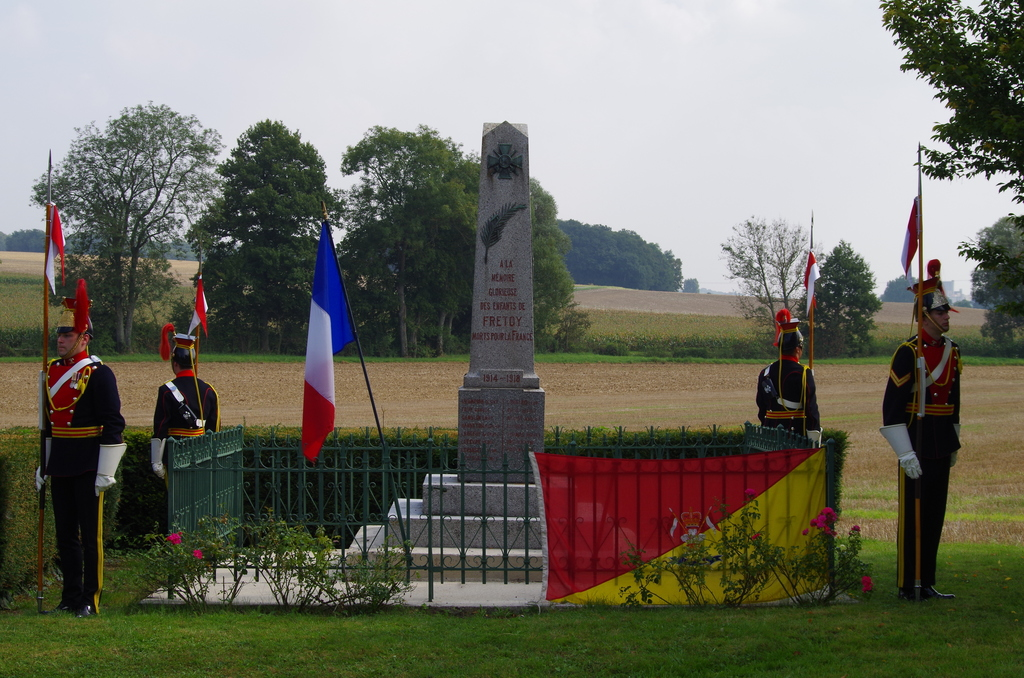
Lancers forming a guard of honour in full dress

Most regiments maintain full dress for limited numbers of personnel, including musicians and guards of honour (in some cases). However, all of these uniforms must be purchased and maintained from non-public funds.

Historically, musicians were an important means of communication on the battlefield and wore distinctive uniforms for easy identification, with coats laced and/or in "reversed colours". This is recalled in the extra uniform lace worn by infantry regiments' corps of drums, and the different coloured helmet plumes worn by trumpeters in the Household Cavalry. Shoulder "wings" are now a distinguishing feature worn by musicians of some non-mounted regiments and corps in ceremonial forms of dress. Originally, wings were embellishments in a certain number foot regiments, so that, in 1750, nineteen out of forty-nine foot regiments wore them, although they had been forbidden in 1730. In December 1752, the wings were reserved for grenadier companies only, followed by the light infantry in 1770. Within less than three decades, these initially small and modest features grew in size, became stiffened and lavishly trimmed with lace and fringes. After a design change, in 1836, the wings disappeared by the end of the Crimean War, 1855, and became solely the privilege of military musicians.

Headgear, as worn with full dress, differs considerably from the peaked caps and berets worn in other orders of dress:

- Field marshals, generals, lieutenant generals, major generals, brigadiers and colonels wear cocked hats with varying amounts of ostrich feathers according to rank;
- Life Guards, Blues and Royals, 1st The Queen's Dragoon Guards and Royal Dragoon Guards wear metal helmets with plumes, the plumes variously coloured to distinguish them.
- King's Royal Hussars, Queen's Royal Hussars, Light Dragoons, the Royal Regiment of Artillery, Royal Engineers and the Royal Signals wear a black fur busby, with different coloured plumes and bags (this is the coloured lining of the busby that is pulled out and displayed on the left-hand side of the headdress).
- As the uniforms of Rifles regiments traditionally aped those of the hussars, a somewhat similar lambskin busby is worn by The Rifles and the Royal Gurkha Rifles, with coloured plumes to distinguish them. However, these busbies do not feature bags like in their hussar counterparts.
- The Royal Lancers and the band of the Royal Yeomanry, feature the czapka, or "lancer's cap". The plumes and top of this headgear historically distinguished the various Lancer regiments.
- The Grenadier Guards, Coldstream Guards, Scots Guards, Irish Guards, Welsh Guards, Royal Scots Dragoon Guards and Honourable Artillery Company wear bearskins, as do officers of the Royal Regiment of Fusiliers; whose other ranks wear the flat-topped fusilier cap. The Drum Major of the Pipes and Drums of the Royal Highland Fusiliers also wears a bearskin cap.
- The Royal Regiment of Scotland wears the Lowland pattern Glengarry with blackcock tail feathers. The Glengarry is worn by 2 SCOTS pipers and drummers and 4 SCOTS pipers.
- The Band of the Royal Regiment of Scotland wears the feather bonnet, as well as 3 SCOTS pipers and drummers and 4 SCOTS pipers. The feather bonnet is also worn by Scots Guards pipers and Royal Scots Dragoon Guards pipers and drummers.
- English and Welsh Line infantry regiments (The Princess of Wales' Royal Regiment, Mercian Regiment, Duke of Lancaster's Regiment, Royal Anglian Regiment, Royal Yorkshire Regiment, and Royal Welsh), the Royal Engineers, Adjutant General's Corps and Corps of Royal Electrical and Mechanical Engineers wear the dark blue Home Service Helmet with a spike ornament on top.
- The Royal Logistic Corps and Royal Army Veterinary Corps wear the Home Service Helmet, with a ball ornament on the top.
- The Royal Tank Regiment, Army Air Corps, Parachute Regiment, Special Air Service, Intelligence Corps and the Special Reconnaissance Regiment wear berets; as they do with all orders of dress.
- The Royal Irish Regiment, the pipers of the Queen's Royal Hussars and the Irish Guards wear the caubeen.
- The Royal Gibraltar Regiment wear a white pith helmet with a spike ornament on the top.

Not all full-dress uniforms are scarlet; light cavalry regiments (hussars, light dragoons and lancers) and the Royal Artillery have worn blue since the 18th century, while rifle regiments wear green. The seven support corps and departments in existence in 1914 all wore dark blue dress uniforms, with different coloured facings. Hussar and Rifle regiments' tunics feature cording across the chest, while that of the Royal Lancers and Army Air Corps features a plastron in the facing colours.

=== Facings ===
Each regiment and corps of the British Army has an allotted facing colour according to Part 14 Section 2 Annex F of the British Army dress regulations. Where full dress is currently not used, the notional colours can be ascertained by the colours of the mess dress; if the regiment in question has not been amalgamated with another. The Intelligence Corps, SAS and SRR have never had a design of full dress, and neither the SAS nor the SRR currently have a design for mess dress. The Intelligence Corps mess dress colour of cypress green is "traditionally unacceptable", and the full dress facing colours of the SAS and SRR can be inferred from their beret colours according to this section of the regulations. The London Regiment and existing Yeomanry regiments have a variety of colours for their various sub-units. In the early twentieth century, these colours were defined by the now defunct British Colour Council.

Blue: Field Marshals, General officers and Colonels, The Life Guards, 1st The Queen's Dragoon Guards, The Royal Dragoon Guards, The Queen's Royal Lancers, Foot Guards Regiments, The Royal Regiment of Scotland, the Princess of Wales Royal Regiment, the Royal Welsh, Adjutant General's Corps, Honourable Artillery Company (Artillery dress), Royal Monmouthshire Royal Engineers

Scarlet: The Blues and Royals, Queen's Royal Hussars, Royal Horse Artillery, Royal Artillery, The Rifles, Royal Electrical and Mechanical Engineers, Educational and Training Services (part of Adjutant General's Corps), Royal Military Police (part of Adjutant General's Corps) Royal Army Physical Training Corps, Royal Corps of Army Music, Honourable Artillery Company (Infantry dress), The Royal Yeomanry

Yellow: Royal Scots Dragoon Guards

Crimson: The King's Royal Hussars, Army Cadet Corps

Buff: The Light Dragoons, The Mercian Regiment

Royal blue: The Duke of Lancaster's Regiment

Maroon: The Parachute Regiment, Royal Army Veterinary Corps

Dark blue: The Royal Anglian Regiment, The Queen's Own Gurkha Logistics Regiment

Black: Royal Corps of Signals, Army Legal Services (part of Adjutant General's Corps)

Blue velvet: Royal Engineers, Queen's Gurkha Engineers, The Royal Logistic Corps

Black velvet: Royal Tank Regiment

Brunswick green: The Royal Yorkshire Regiment

Piper green: The Royal Irish Regiment

Grey: The Intelligence Corps

Cambridge blue: Army Air Corps, Small Arms School Corps

Purple: Royal Army Chaplains Department

Dull cherry: Royal Army Medical Service

Slate grey: Royal Gibraltar Regiment

=== Gallery ===
Examples of full dress uniform
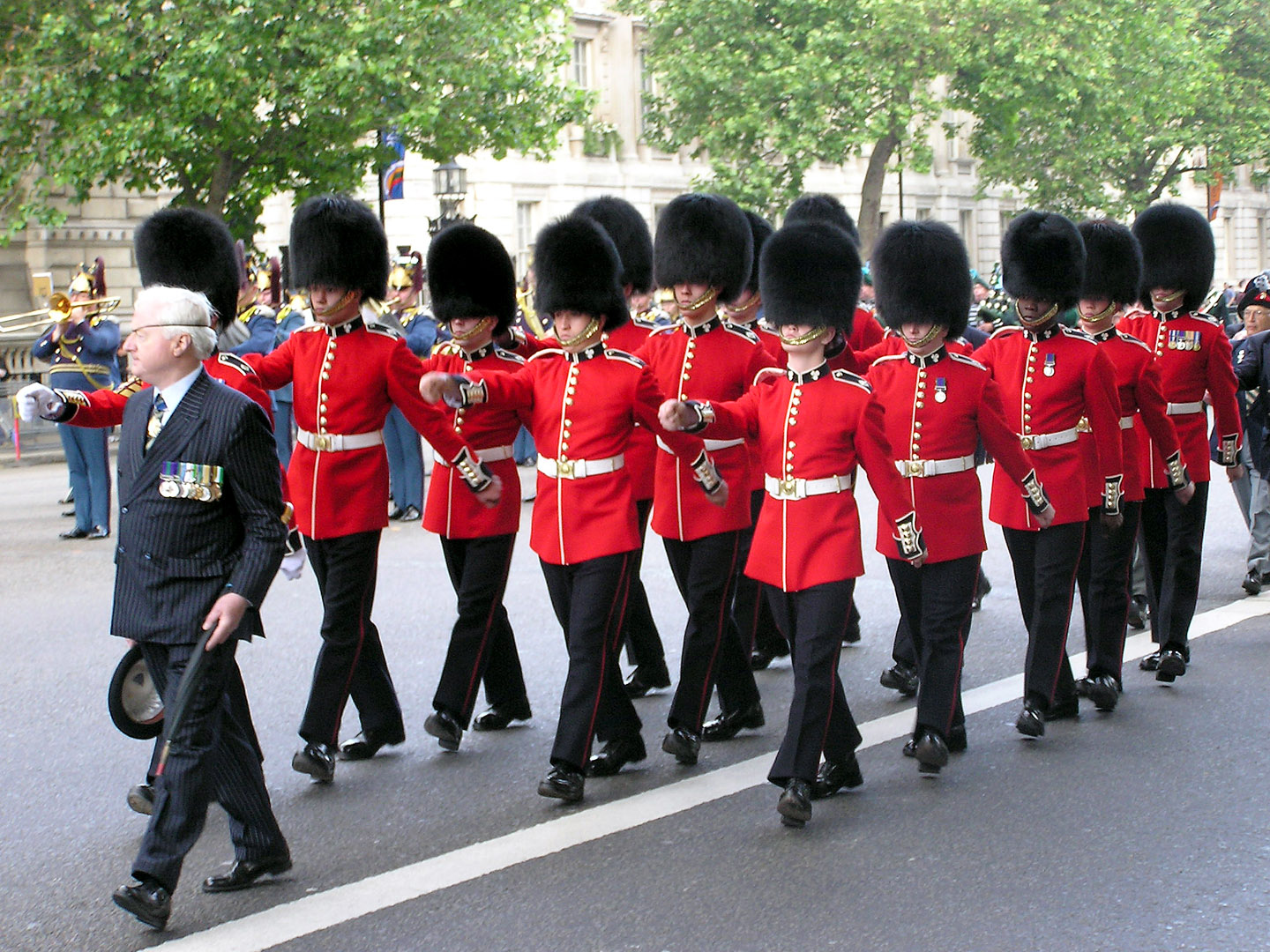
Soldiers of the Irish Guards in full dress (as with the other regiments of the Foot Guards, a tall Bearskin is worn).

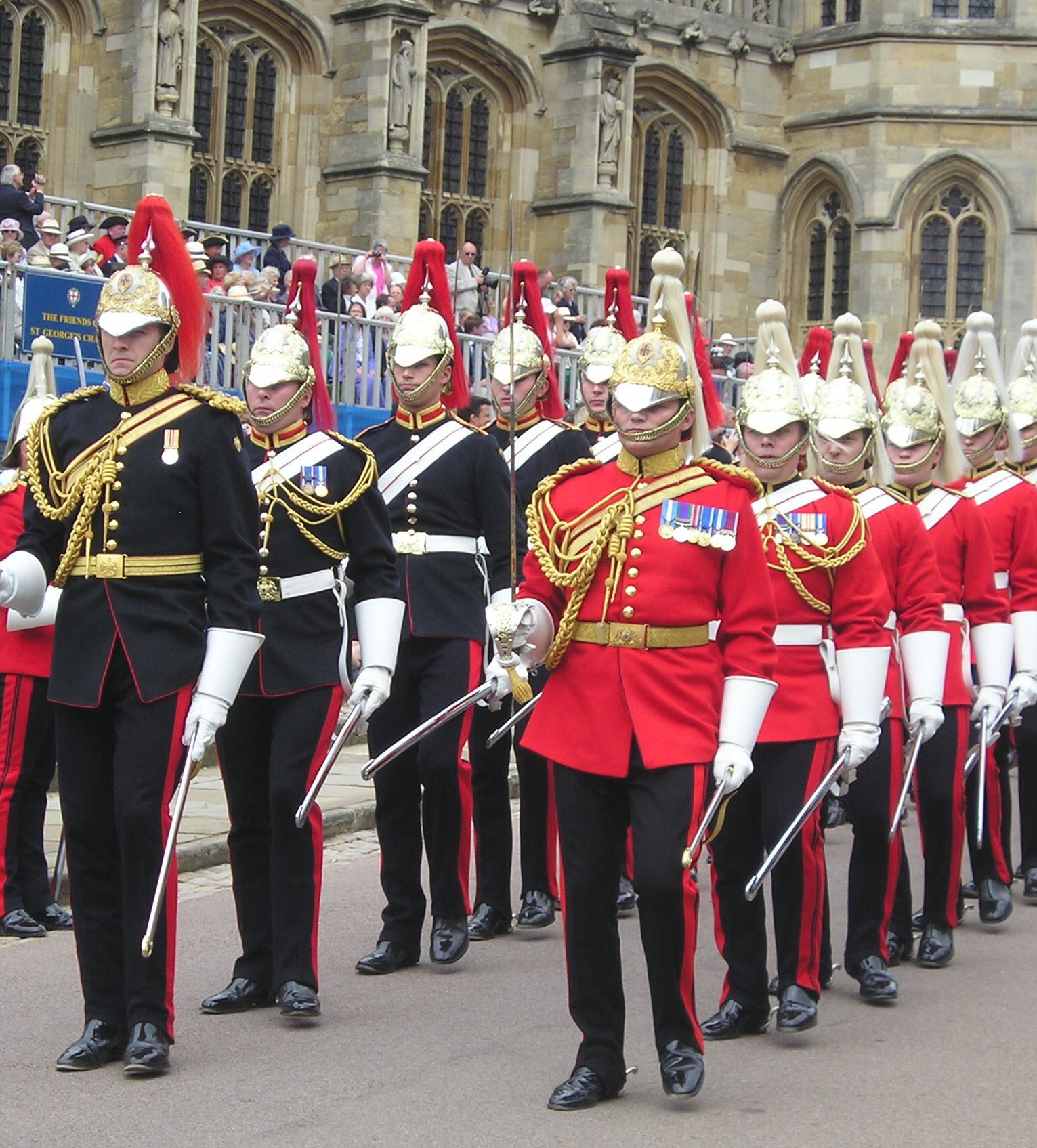
Full dismounted dress of the Household Cavalry: the Blues and Royals (left) and the Life Guards (right).

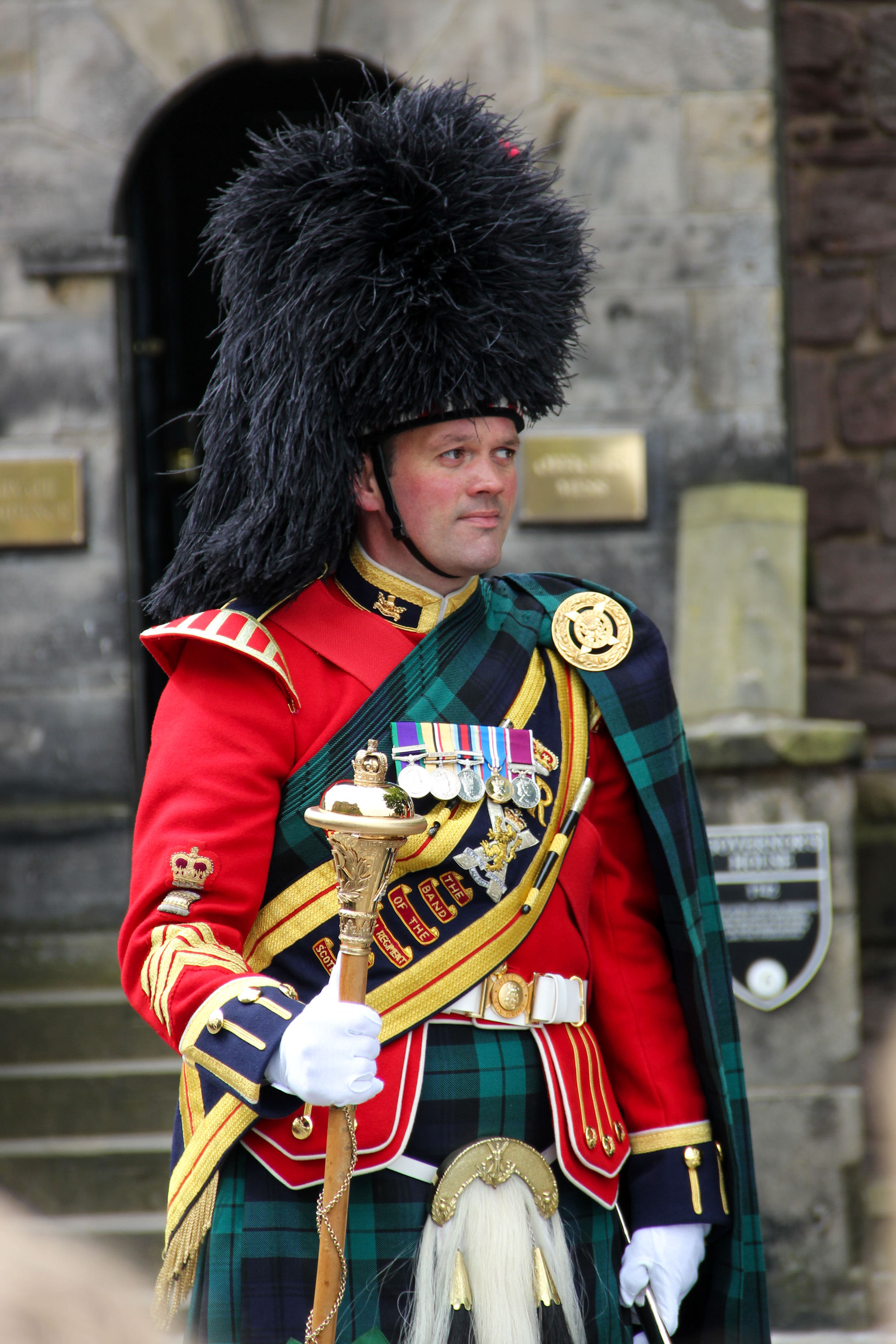
Full dress, Royal Regiment of Scotland (including scarlet doublet and feathered bonnet)

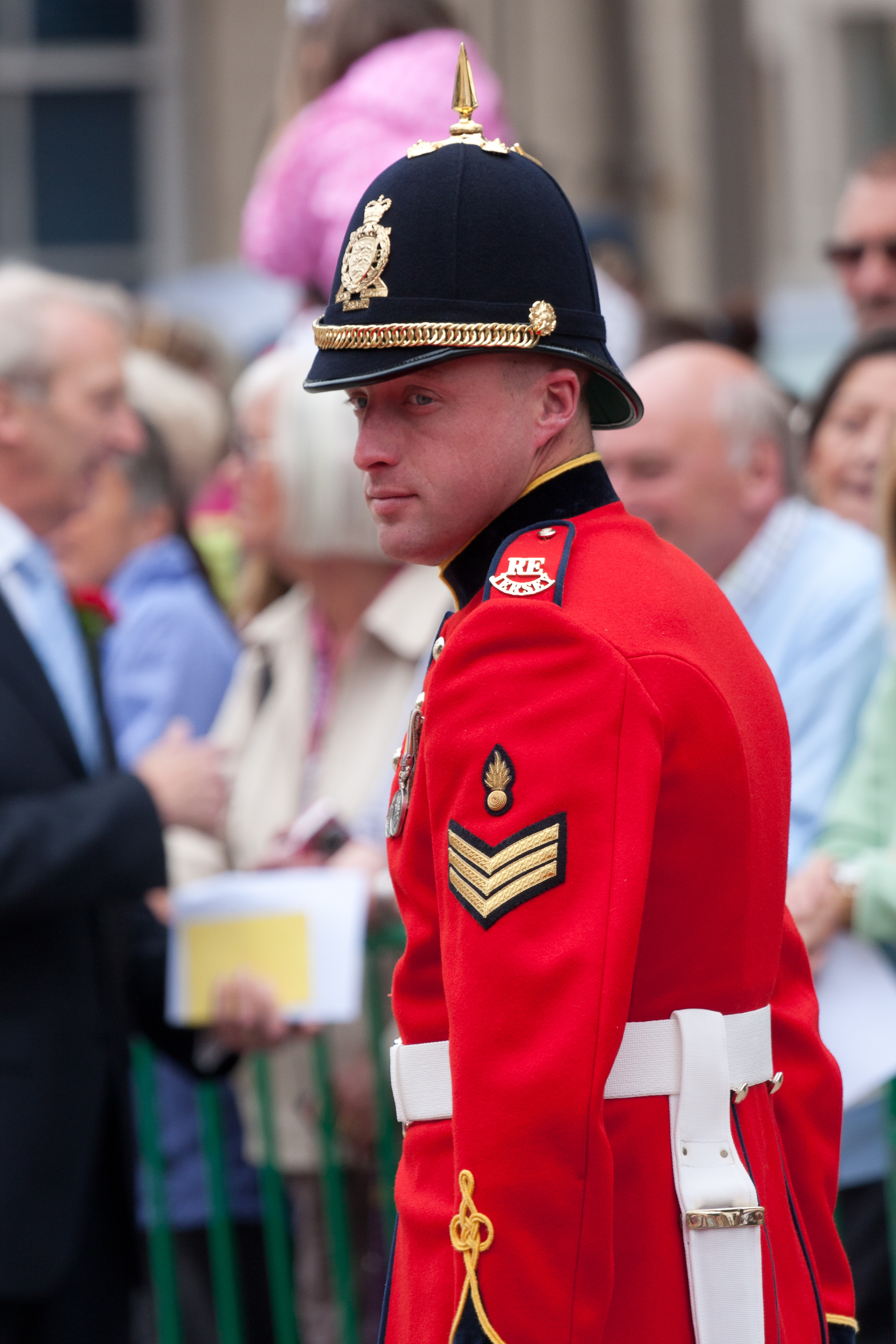
A non-commissioned officer of the Jersey Field Squadron Royal Engineers on duty in full dress uniform, 2012

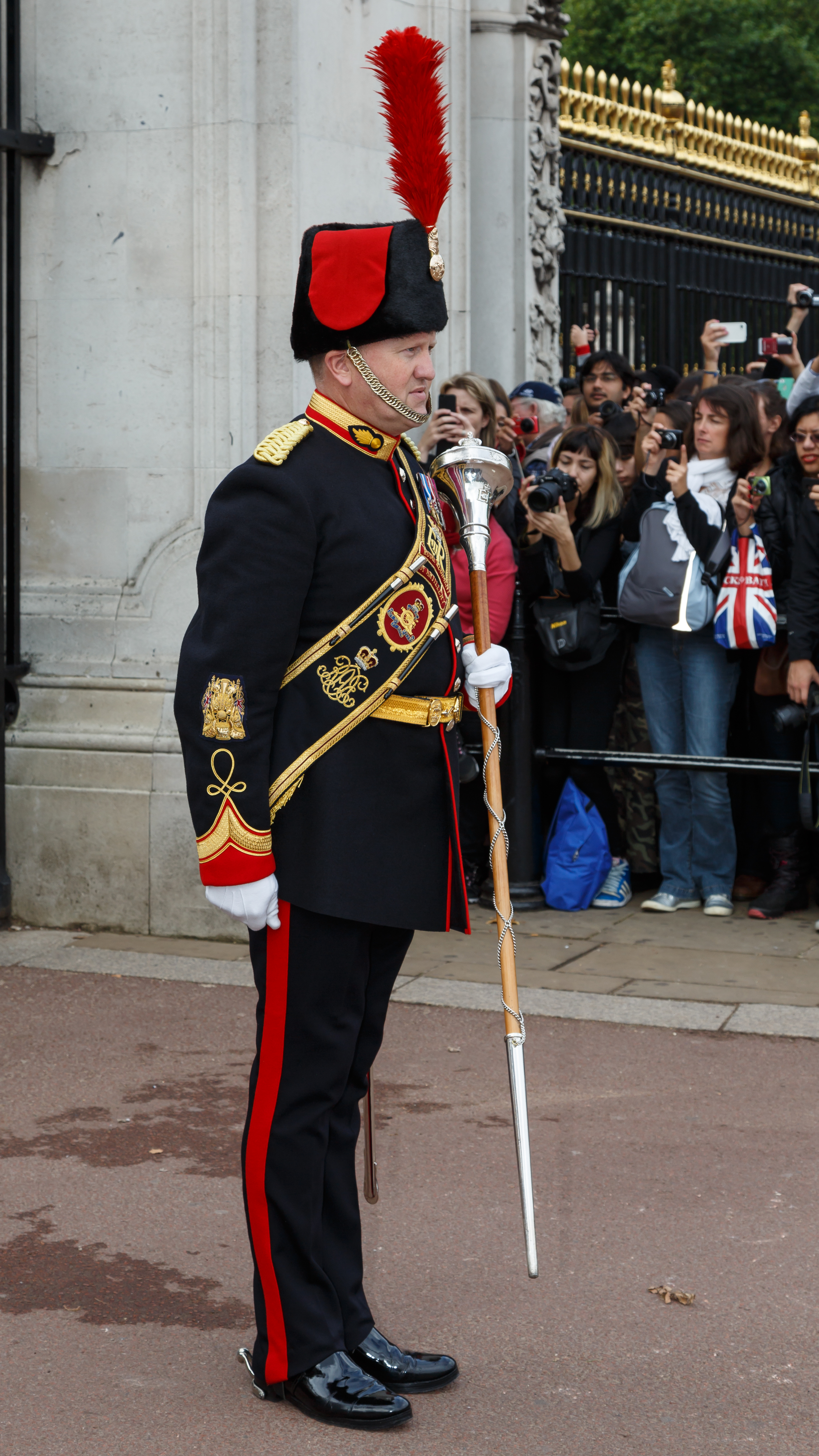
The drum major of the Royal Artillery Band in full dress.

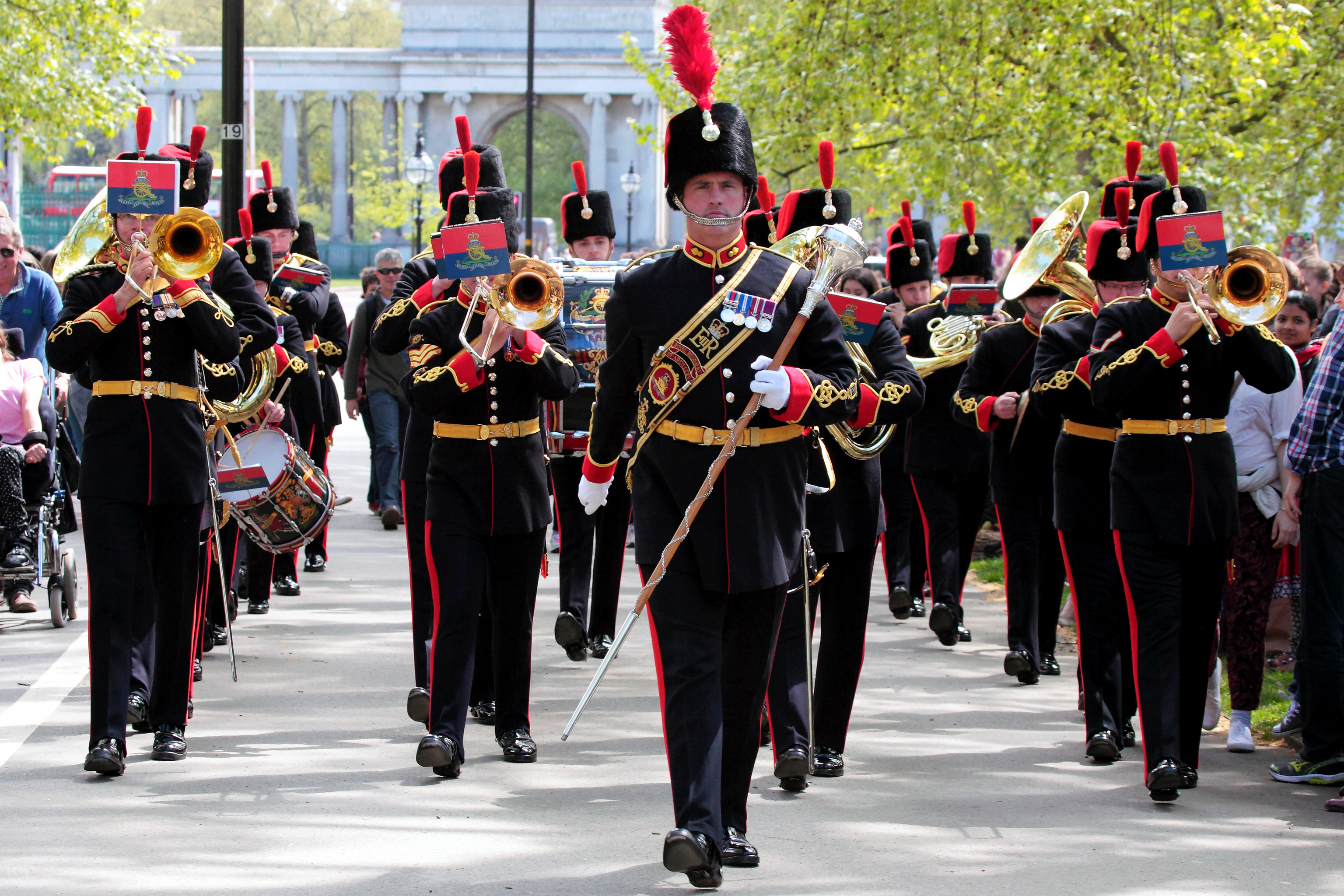
The Royal Artillery Band

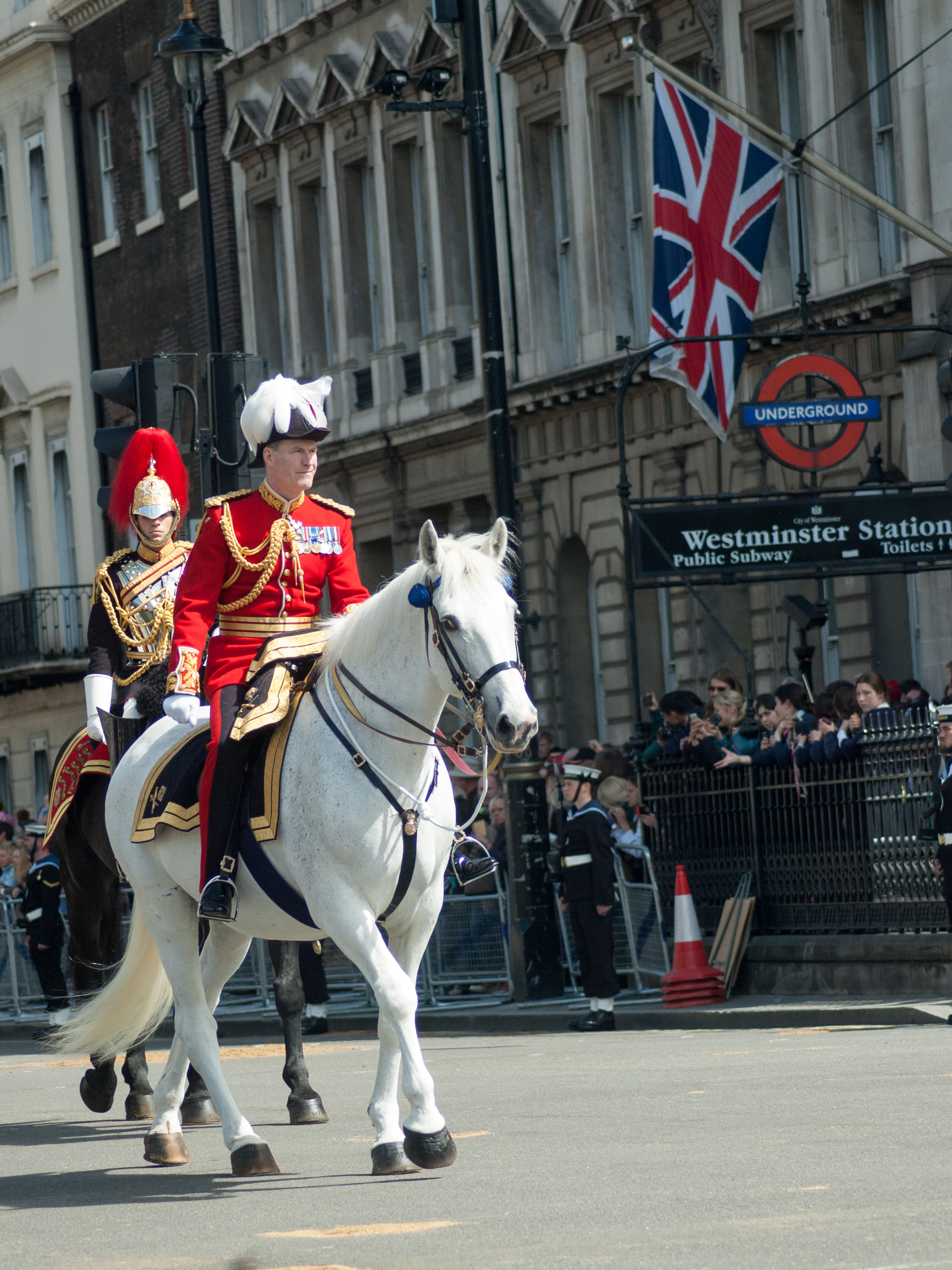
General officer's full dress, as worn by Edward Smyth-Osborne (Major-General commanding the Household Division).

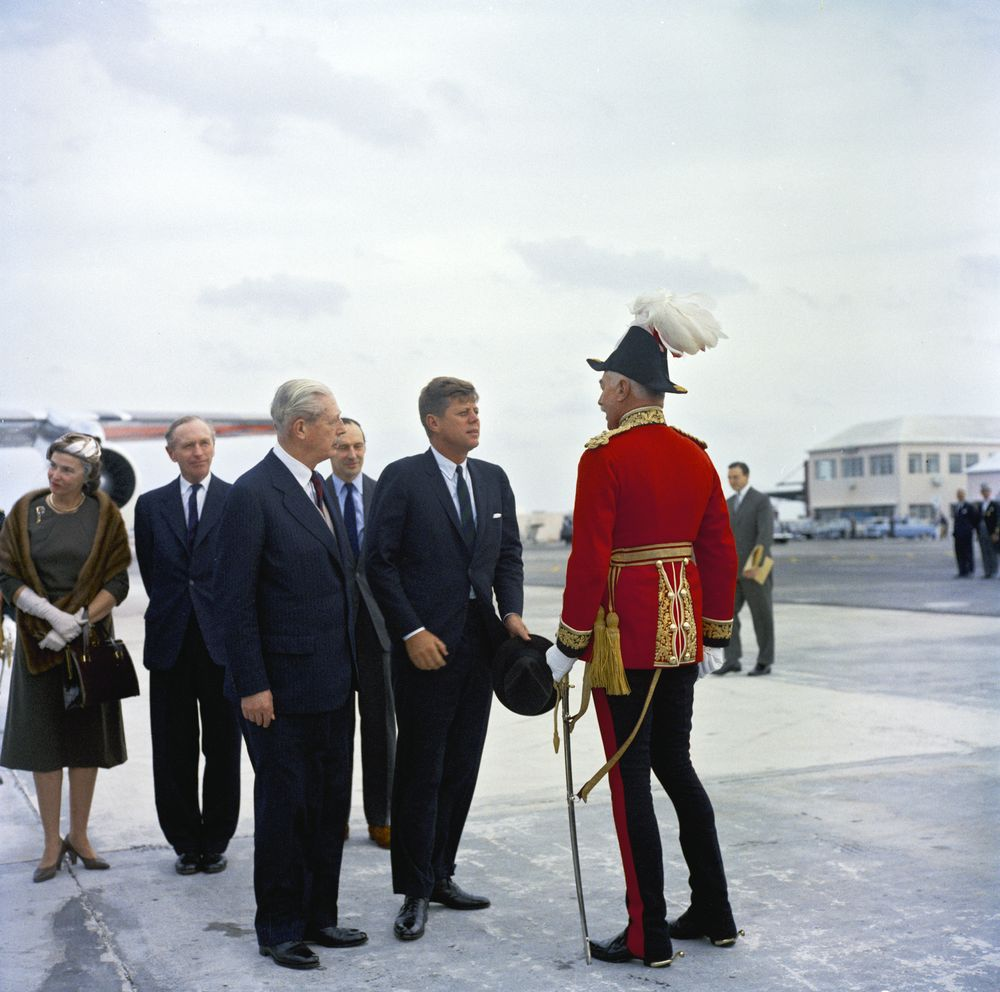
Major-General Sir Julian Gascoigne (right), wearing General officer's full dress as Governor and military Commander-in-Chief of Bermuda (with Minister for Foreign Affairs the Earl of Home, Prime Minister Harold Macmillan, British Ambassador to the United States Sir David Ormsby-Gore, and United States President John F. Kennedy) in 1962.

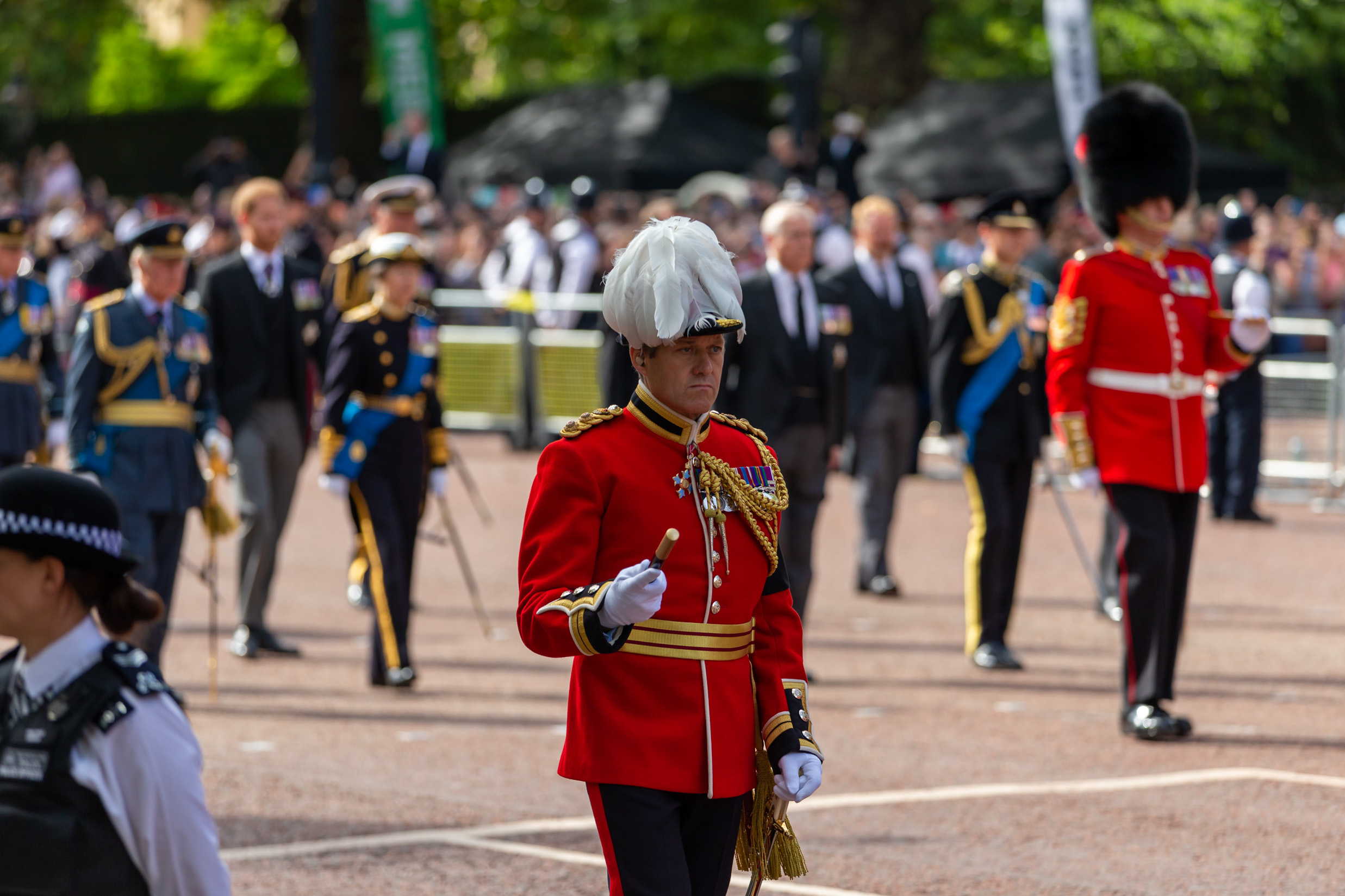
A colonel wearing full dress uniform at the Lying in State of Queen Elizabeth II (2022).

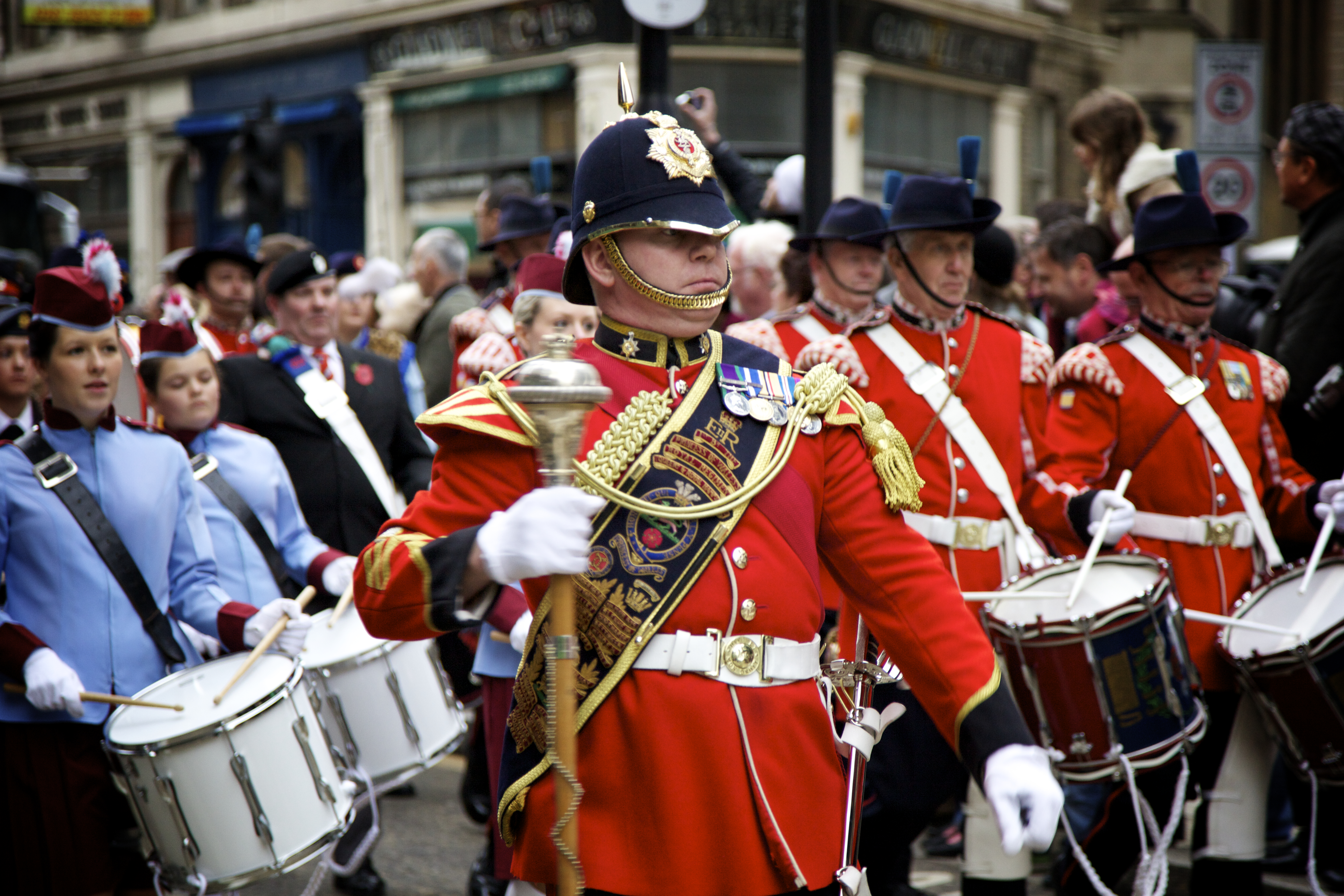
Full dress of the Princess of Wales' Royal Regiment, as worn by the Regimental band.

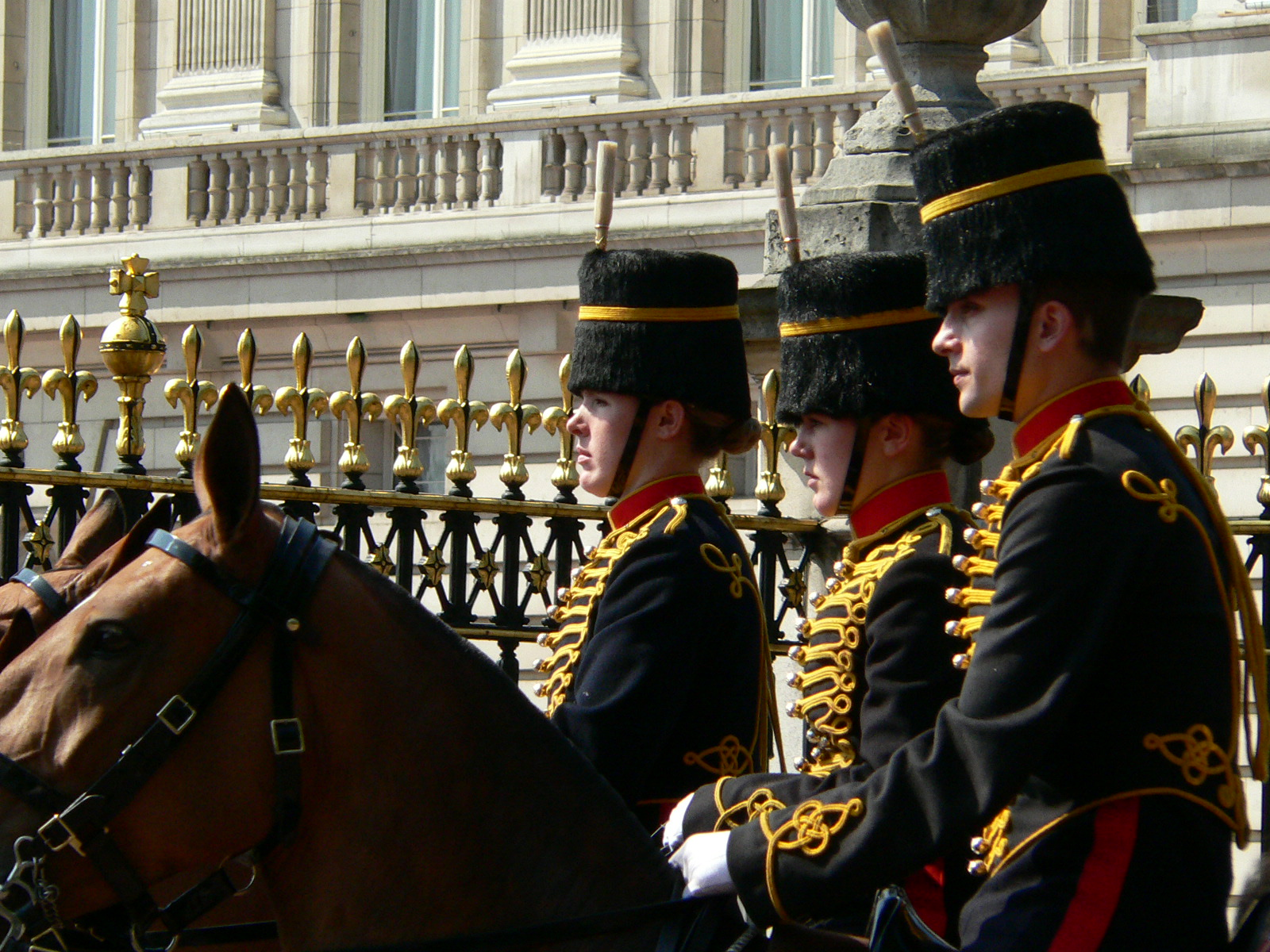
Full dress of the Royal Horse Artillery, as worn by the King's Troop.

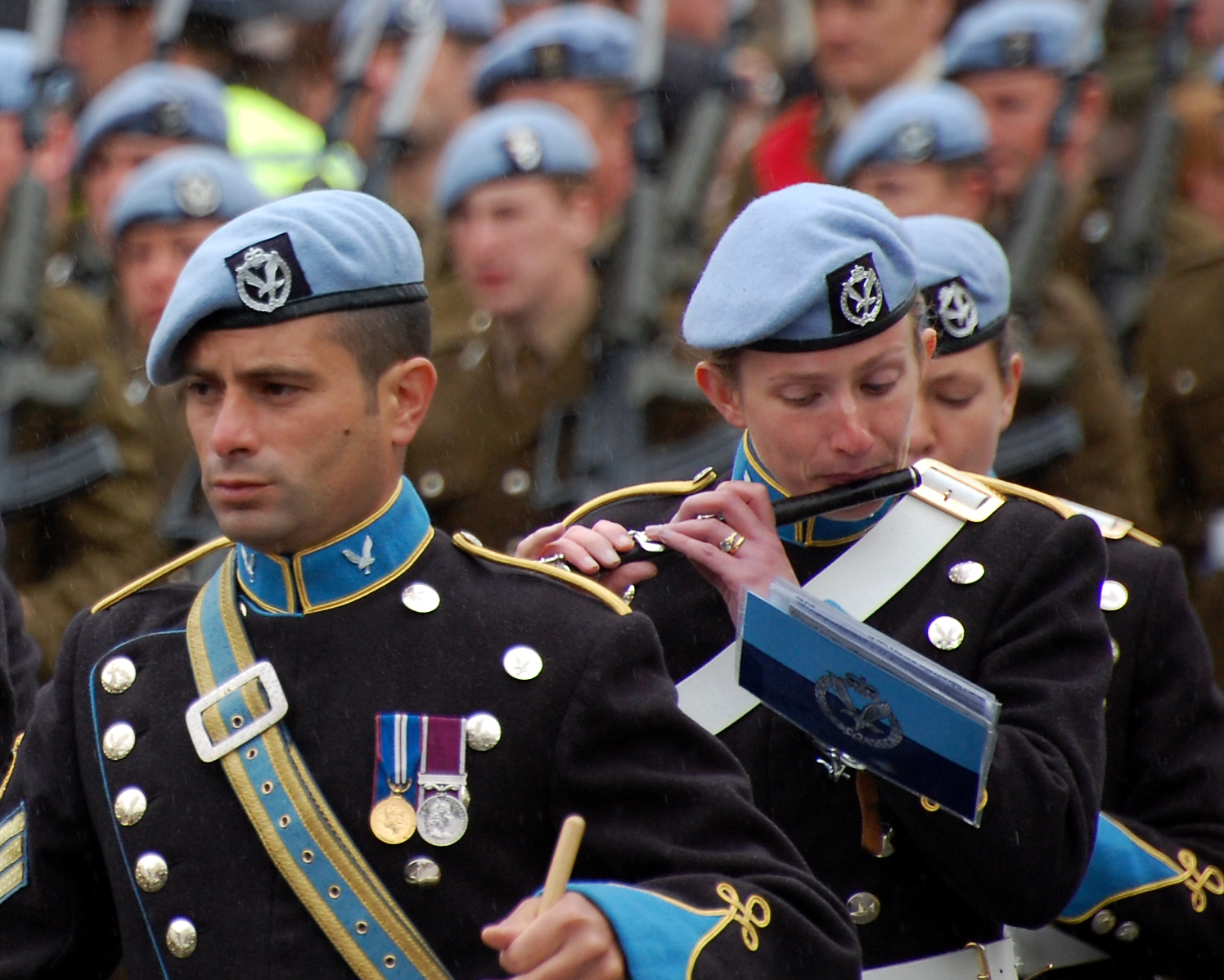
Full dress of the Army Air Corps, as worn by the regimental band.

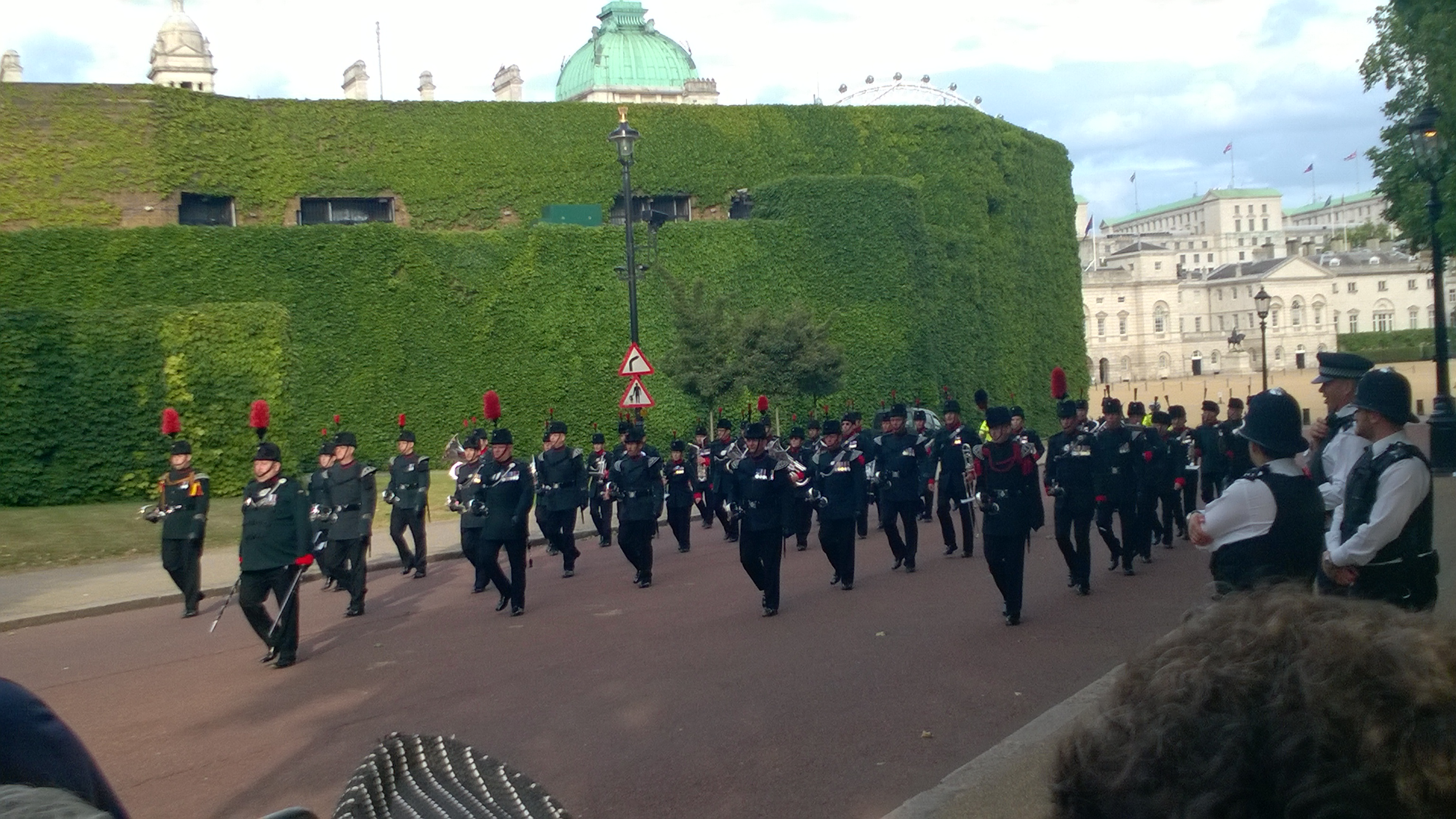
Full dress of the Rifles, as worn by the Waterloo Band.

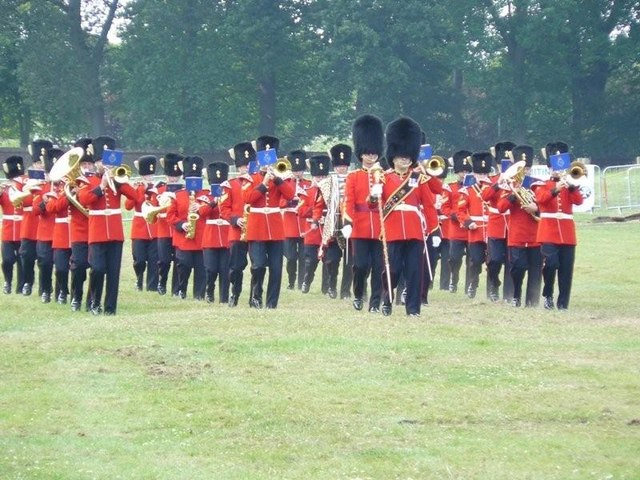
Full dress of the Royal Fusiliers, as worn by the Minden Band.

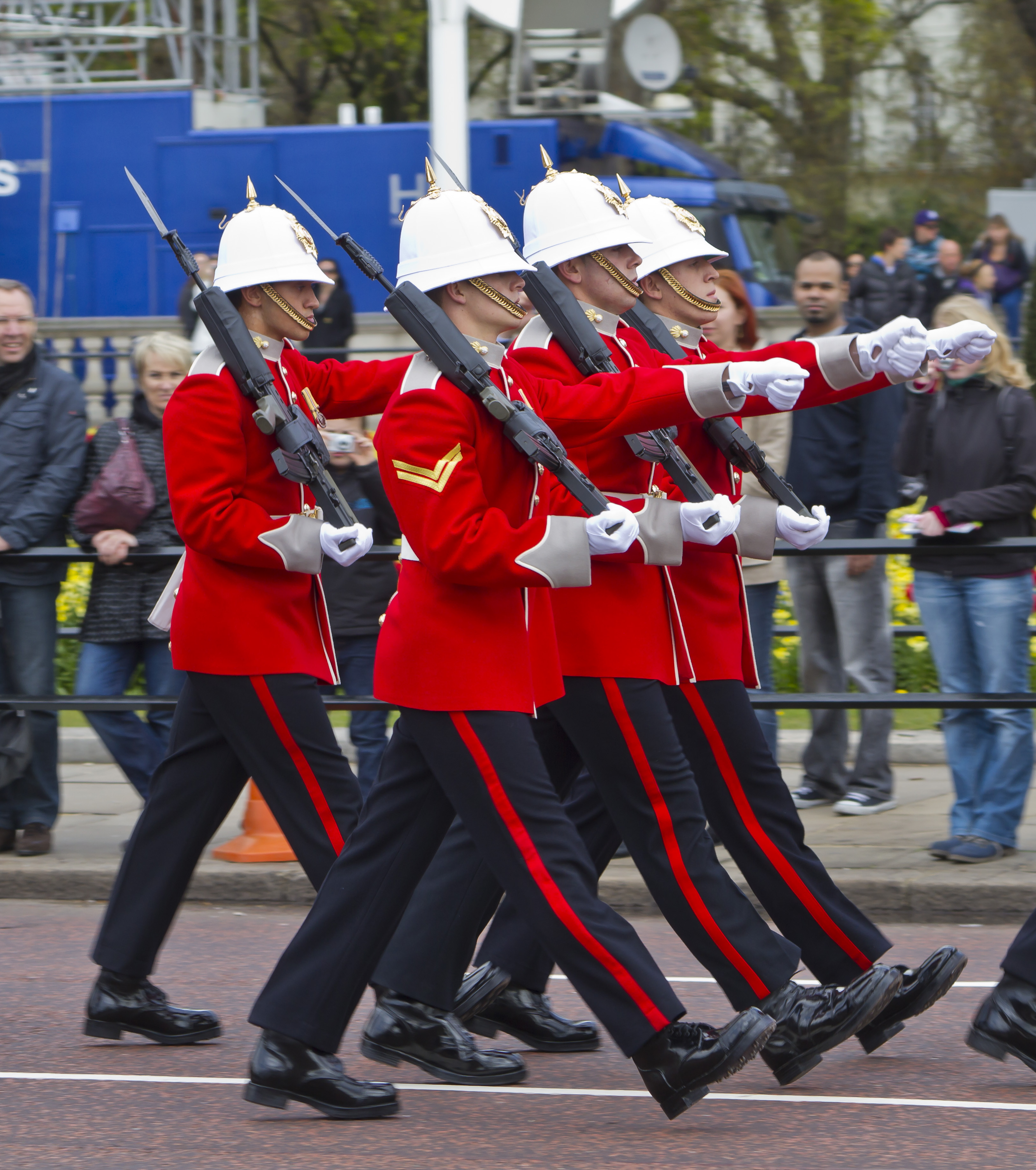
Full dress of the Royal Gibraltar Regiment

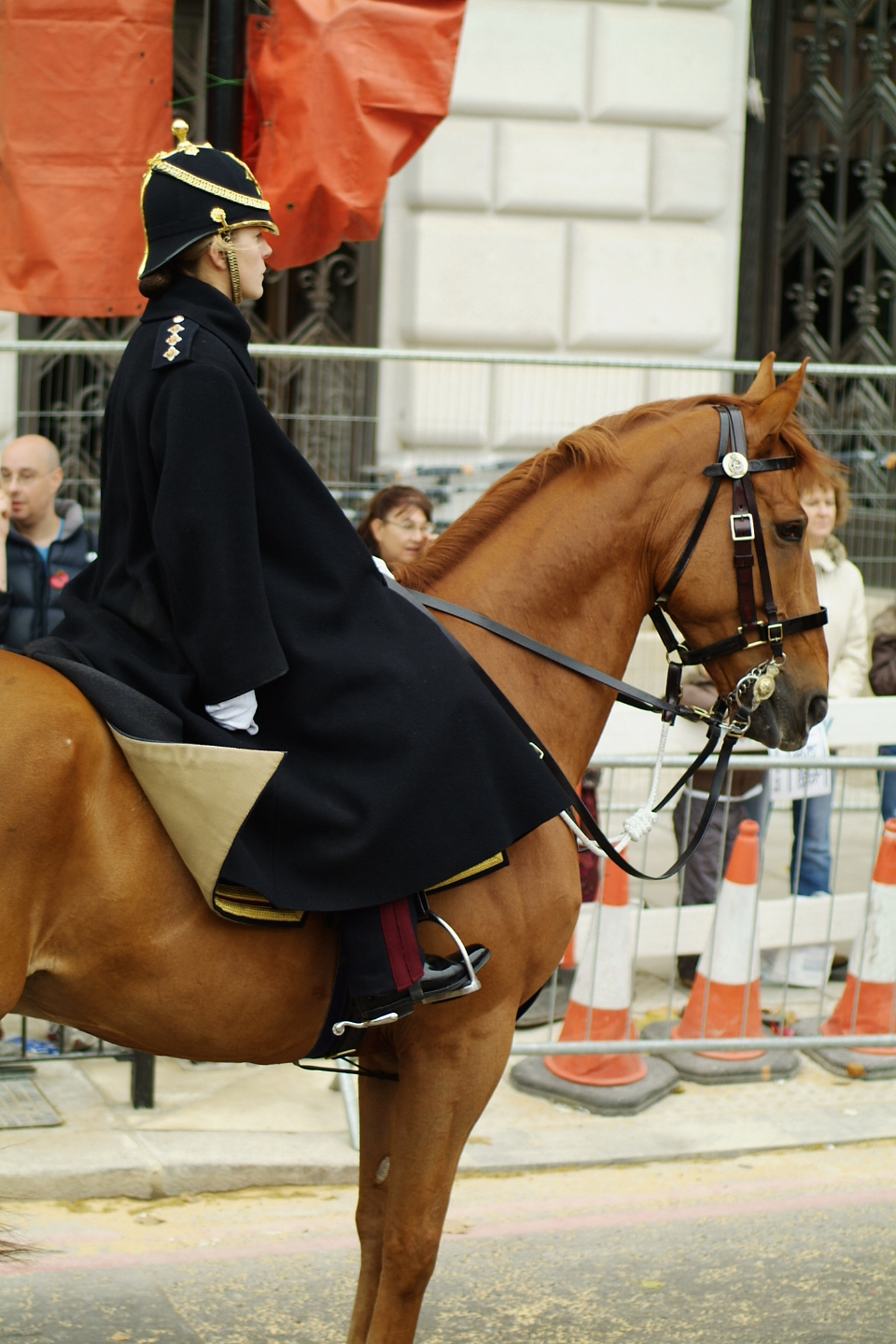
Full dress of the Royal Army Veterinary Corps

=== Frock coats ===
One type of frock coat may be worn by officers of lieutenant general and above (and major generals in certain appointments) on formal occasions when not on parade in command of troops. They are a knee-length, dark blue, double-breasted coat with velvet collar and cuffs. It is usually worn with the peaked cap but is occasionally worn with a cocked hat by certain office-holders such as the Major-General commanding the Household Division, Gold Stick and Silver Stick and the Constable of the Tower.

A different type of frock coat is worn by certain officers of the Household Division, Honourable Artillery Company and King's Troop of the Royal Horse Artillery. These are also dark blue but are single-breasted and with ornate black braiding and loops. Similar braided coats are worn on occasion by directors of music and bandmasters of bands affiliated to line cavalry regiments (in other bands they wear a plainer double-breasted frock coat similar to that of senior officers but without the velvet) in dark blue (or green for The Rifles).

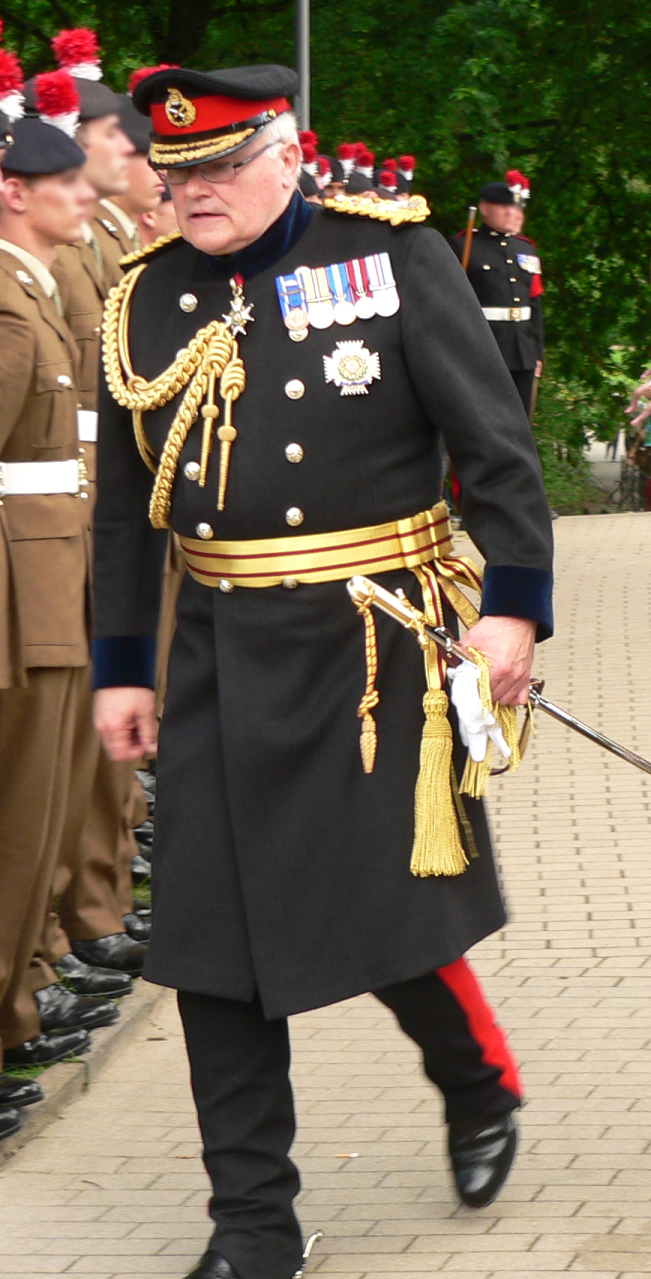
Frock coat as worn by a general officer (Sir Peter Wall).

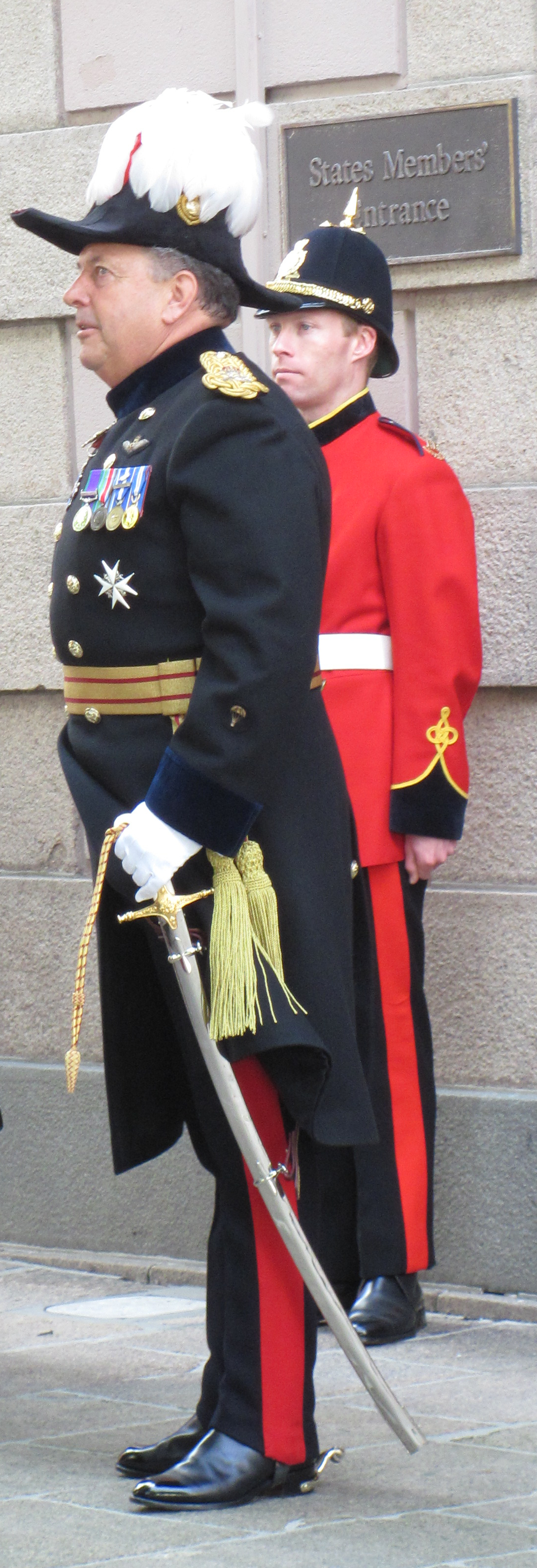
Frock coat worn with a cocked hat by the Lieutenant Governor of Jersey.

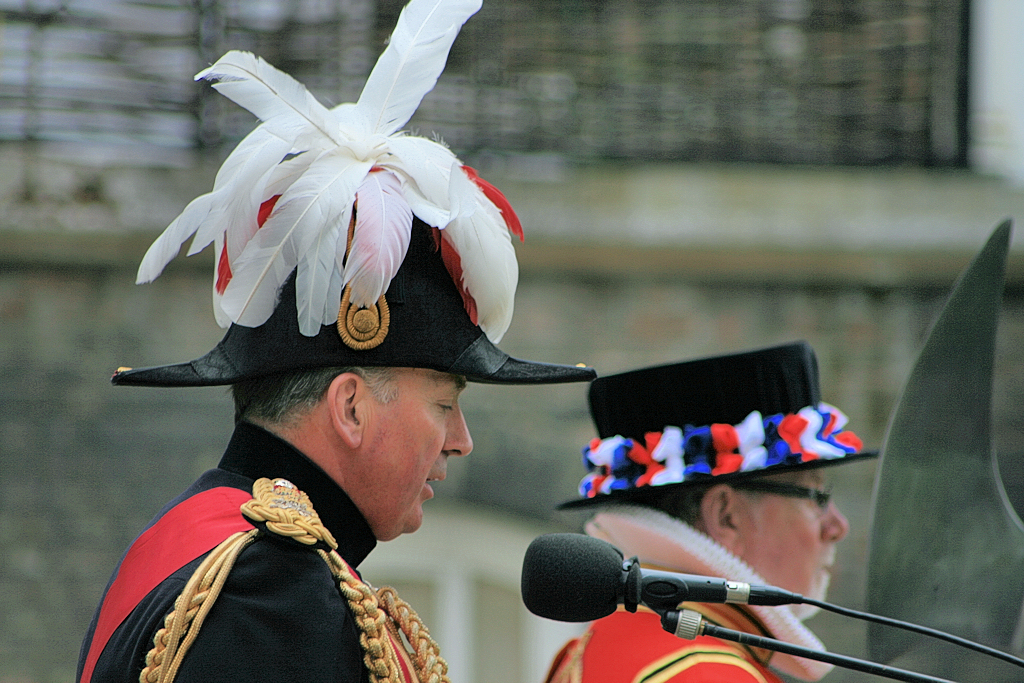
British Army cocked hat with General officer's plume, worn by the Constable of the Tower.

== Numbered orders of dress (active use) ==
A selection of uniforms mostly worn in the British Army as worn by the Royal Yorkshire Regiment. (Now with a red band around the cap, signifying that the regiment is a royal regiment.)

Fourteen numbered "orders" of dress (in addition to full dress) are set out in Army Dress Regulations but many of these are rarely worn or have been phased out altogether. Numbers 5 and 9 have been replaced by the new "Personal Clothing System" Combat Uniform (or PCS-CU for short). Several orders of dress are only issued to officers (and senior non-commissioned officers in some cases); others are only issued to personnel serving in particular climates or specific roles.

=== No. 1: Temperate ceremonial ===
Officers'

Other ranks'

British Army No. 1 dress (Royal Yorkshire Regiment)

No. 1 dress, or "dress blues", is a ceremonial uniform, worn on only the most formal of occasions and by senior staff officers, aides to the Royal Family, and to the personal staff of senior officers in command. It is not generally issued to all units, with the khaki No. 2 dress functioning as the main parade uniform.

No. 1 dress originated in the "undress" uniforms ('blue Patrols') worn for semi-formal or ordinary duty occasions in the late 19th century. It was first issued in its current form for the 1937 Coronation, intended as a cheaper alternative to the full dress uniforms that had been generally withdrawn after 1914. It became known as No. 1 dress in 1947. Army units participating in the 1953 coronation wore the new uniform as a temporary issue.

For most units, No. 1 dress consists of a dark blue stand collared tunic, matching trousers, and peaked cap, caubeen, or beret depending on the regiment. Female members may wear skirts with tights in place of the trousers. Units are distinguished by badges and the colours of the cap, tunic piping, vertical stripes ("welts") on the trousers, and the colour of the collar for certain cavalry regiments. The Rifles wear a rifle green tunic with black trousers. The Royal Gurkha Rifles wear matching tunics and trousers of rifle green. The Royal Dragoon Guards and the King's Royal Hussars wear dark green and crimson trousers respectively. Cavalry regiments wear shoulder chains in place of shoulder straps, and for officers "overalls" (tight-fitting trousers historically worn by mounted troops). The Royal Regiment of Scotland wears a short jacket called a "doublet", in Archer Green. Prior to amalgamation, Highland regiments wore the doublet with the kilt and sporran while Lowland regiments wore trews, both in the individual regiment's tartan.

In the full ceremonial order of No. 1 dress, officers wear a waist sash of crimson silk and twisted cord epaulettes; while general officers wear a waist sash of gold and crimson stripes. Light cavalry regiments wear a lace crossbelt in place of the sash, while Rifle regiments wear a polished black leather crossbelt, as do the Special Air Service and Royal Army Chaplains Department (who have a unique pattern of tunic that features an open step collar instead of a stand collar). Other ranks wear a white, buff, or black leather belt with a regimental pattern locket, with a bayonet frog if carrying arms. The other accoutrements, such as gloves, are generally the same as is worn in full dress.

The peaked forage cap is worn by most regiments exceptions being:

- Beret:
  - Royal Tank Regiment
  - 4/73 (Sphinx) Special Observation Post Battery RA
  - Royal Regiment of Fusiliers
  - other ranks of the Royal Welsh
  - Parachute Regiment
  - Special Air Service
  - Intelligence Corps
  - Staff Sergeants and ranks below of the Royal Logistic Corps
  - Army Air Corps
  - Qualified personnel serving with a unit forming part of air assault, or commando formations or with Army Aviation Units
- Glengarry
  - Royal Regiment of Scotland
- Caubeen
  - Royal Irish Regiment
- Kilmarnock cap
  - Royal Gurkha Rifles

The above headdress is also worn as part of Numbers 3, 10 and 11 dress (and with Number 2 and 6 dress on formal parades).

Soldiers

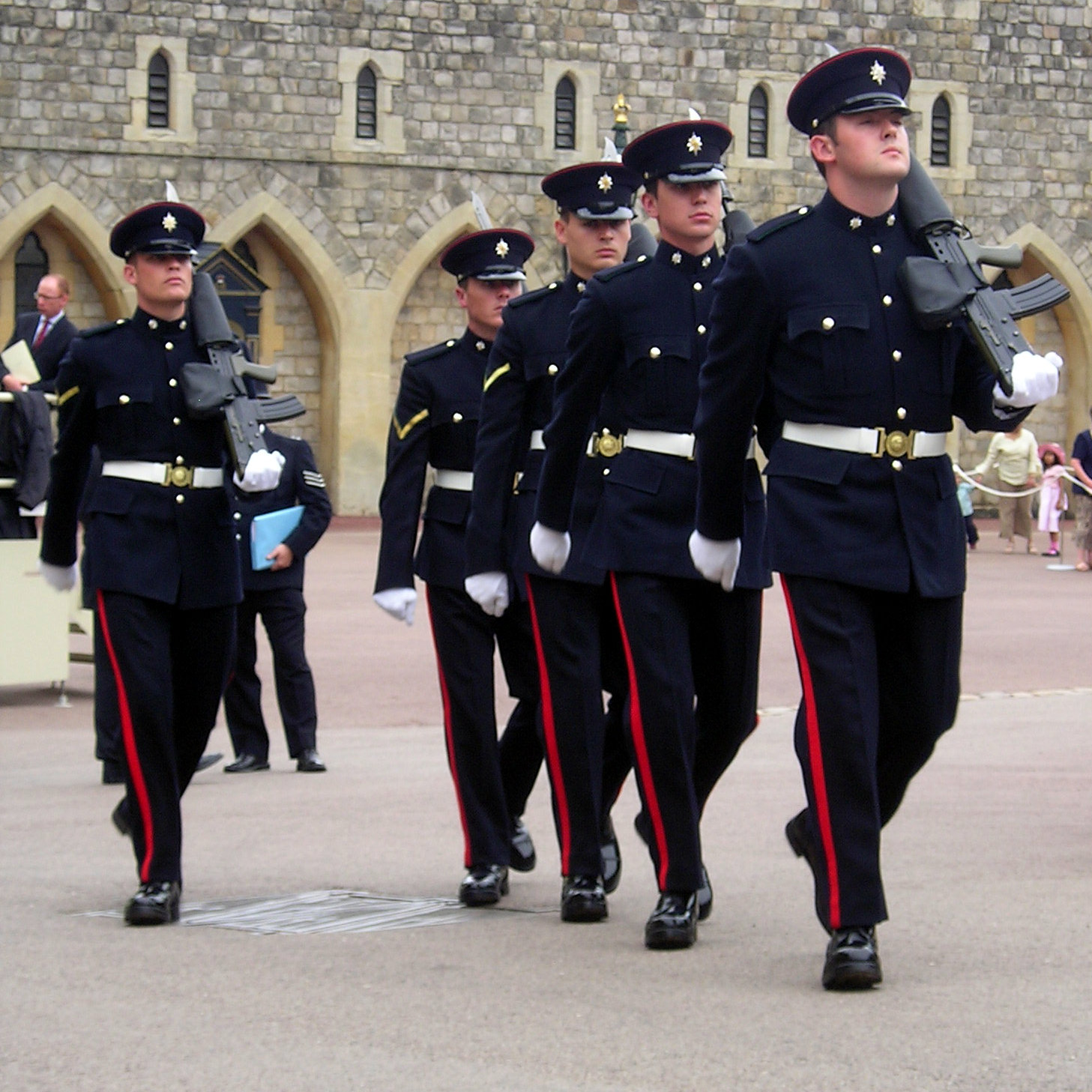
Infantry of the Line: Soldiers of the Worcestershire and Sherwood Foresters Regiment in No. 1 dress

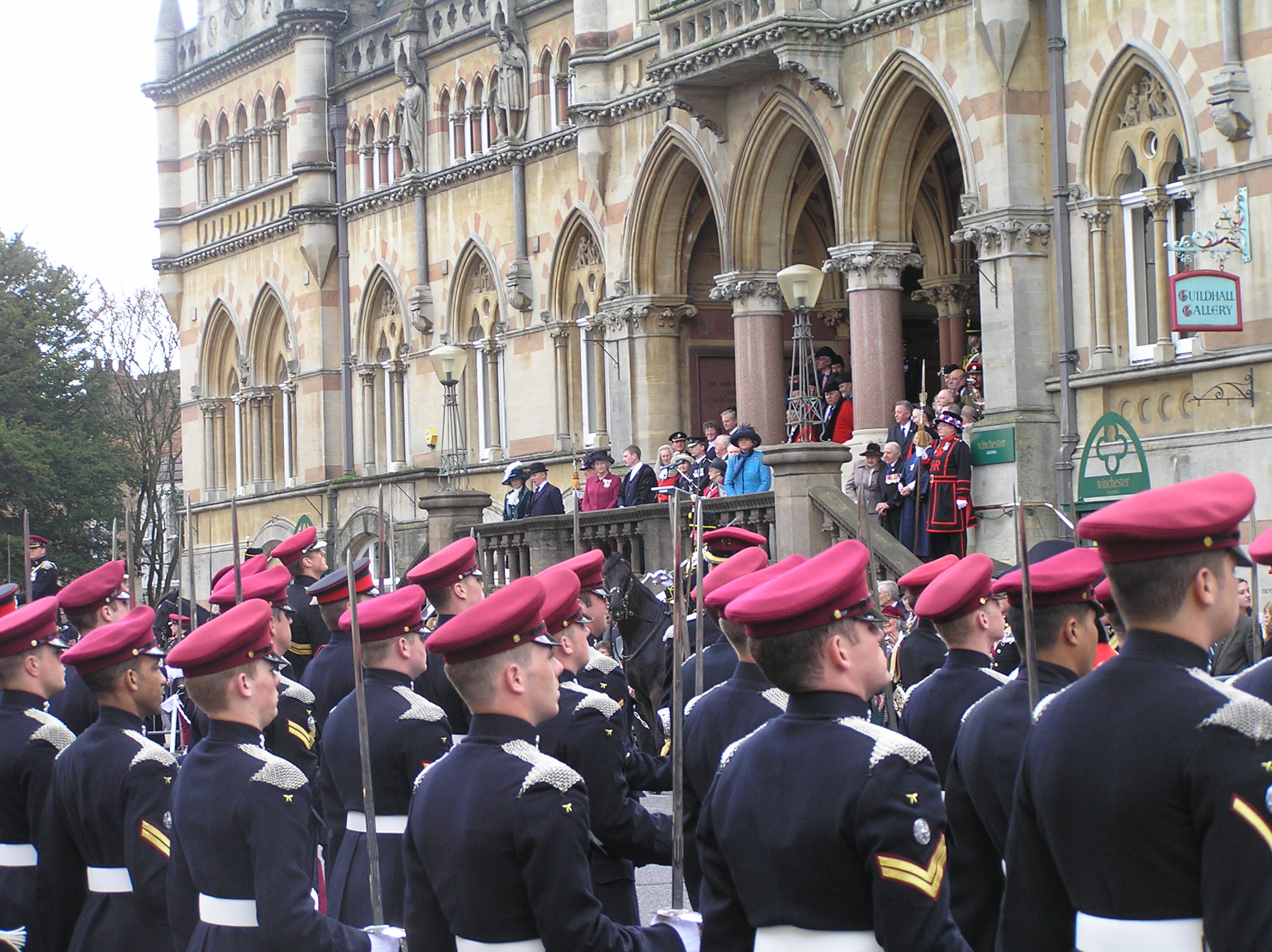
Cavalry of the Line: No. 1 dress (with shoulder chains) as worn by the King's Royal Hussars

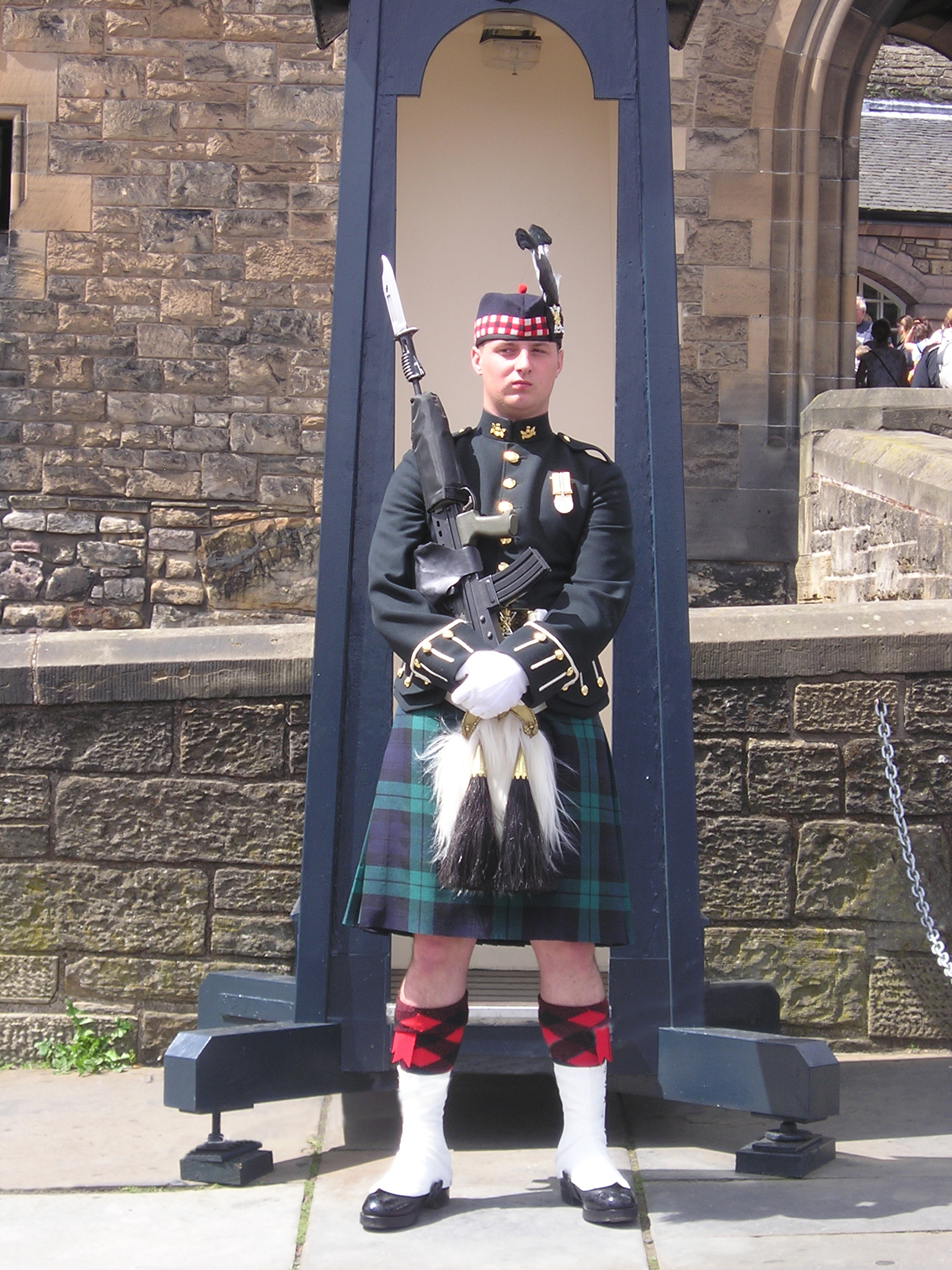
A private of the Royal Regiment of Scotland wearing the Scottish version of No. 1 dress.

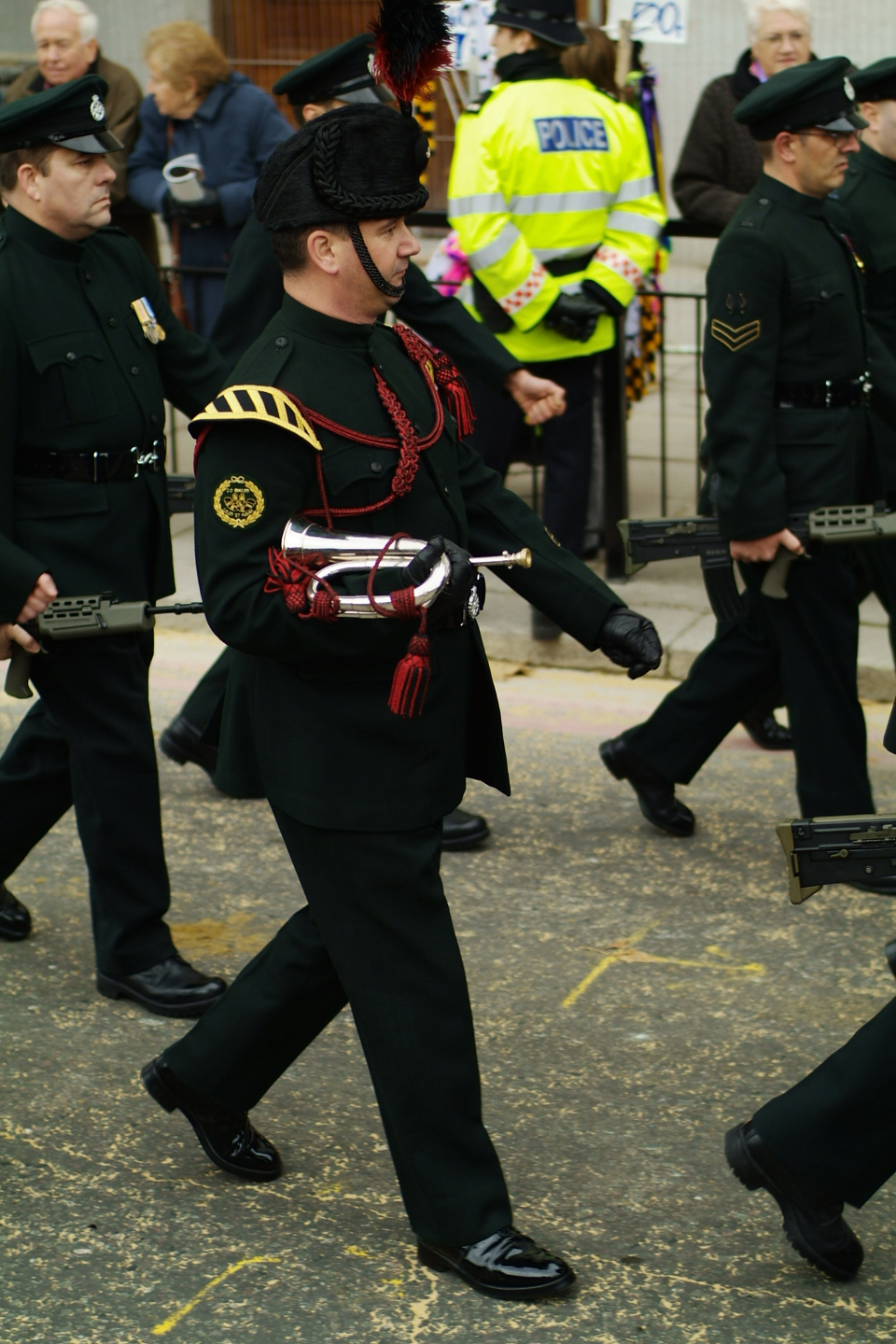
Riflemen in dark green No. 1 dress uniform; bugler (foreground) in full dress busby.

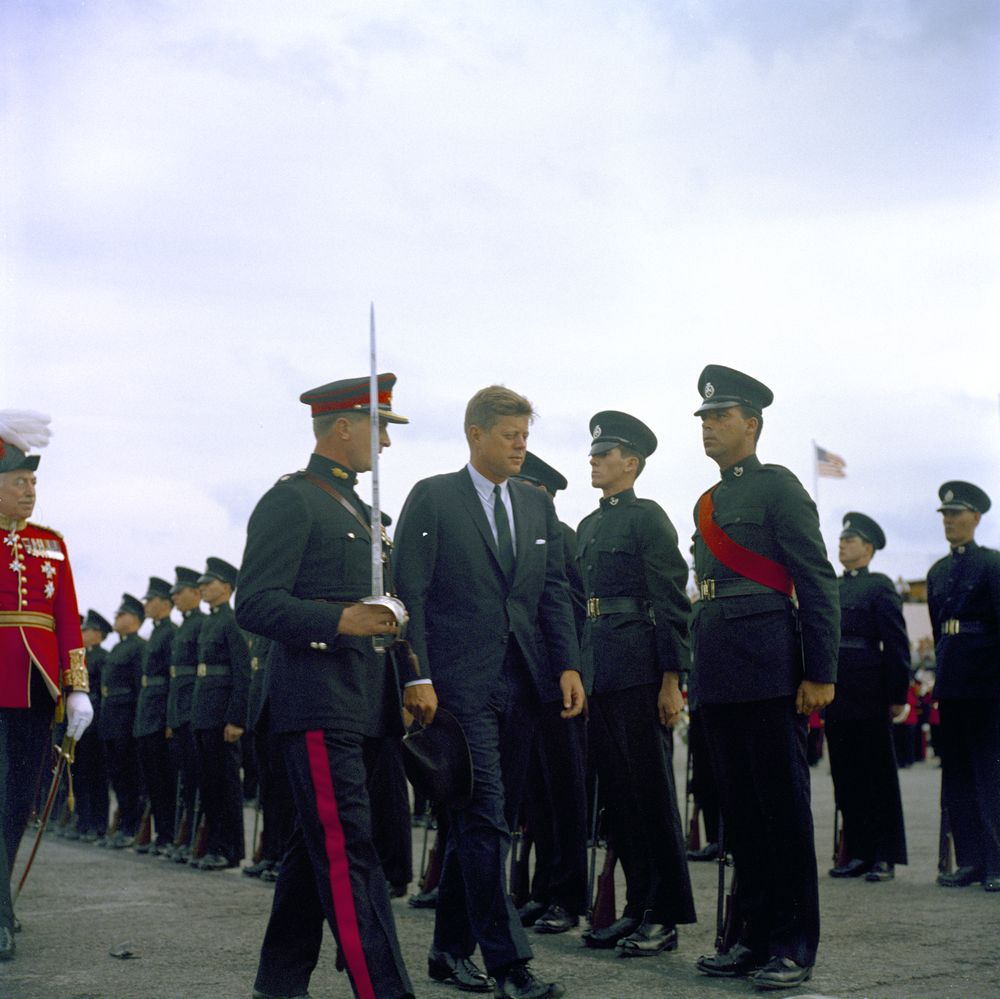
US President John F. Kennedy, escorted by a Bermuda Militia Artillery officer in Royal Artillery blue No. 1 dress, inspects green-uniformed riflemen of the Bermuda Rifles in 1961

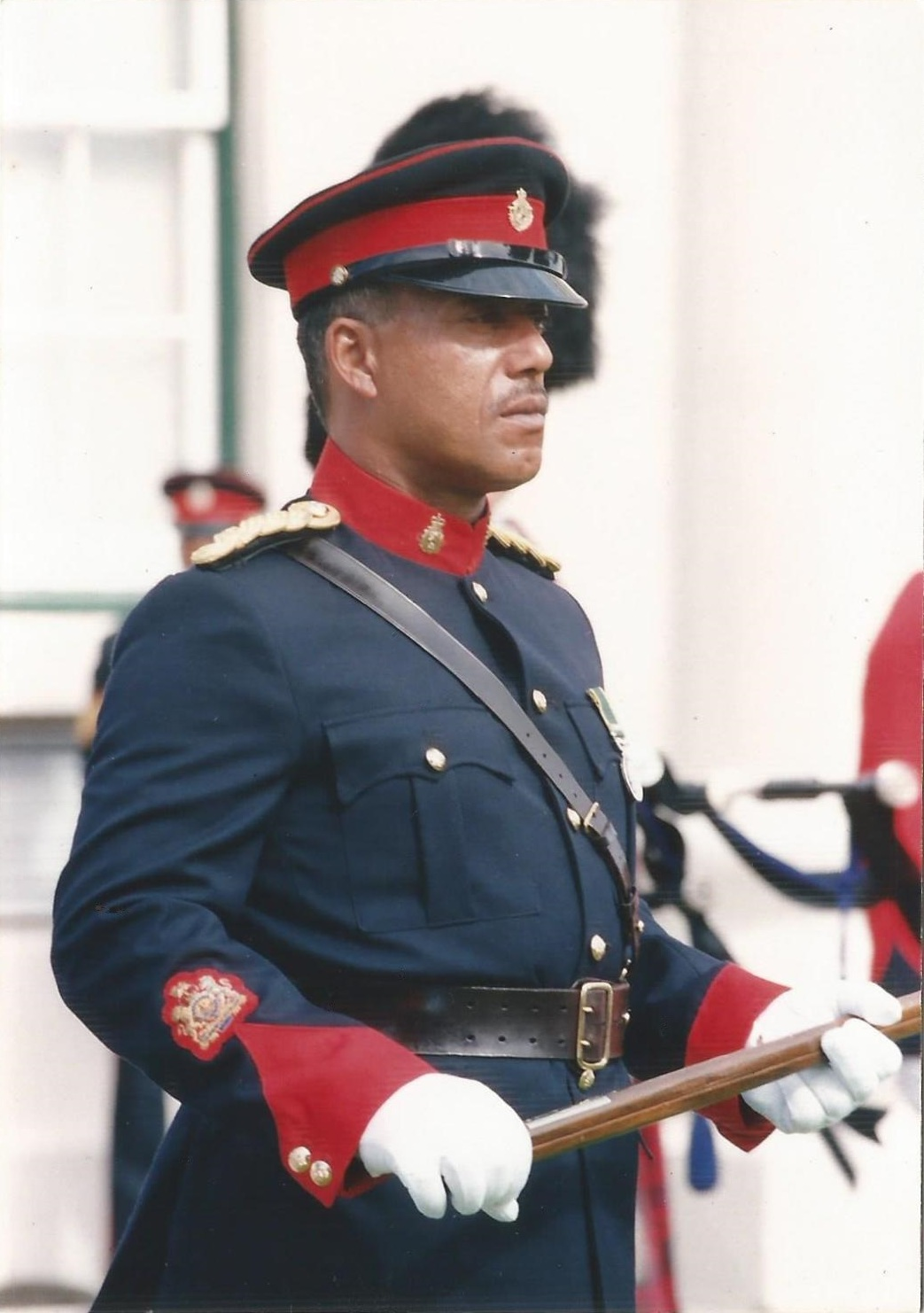
Regimental Sergeant Major in Royal Bermuda Regiment No. 1 dress with red facings

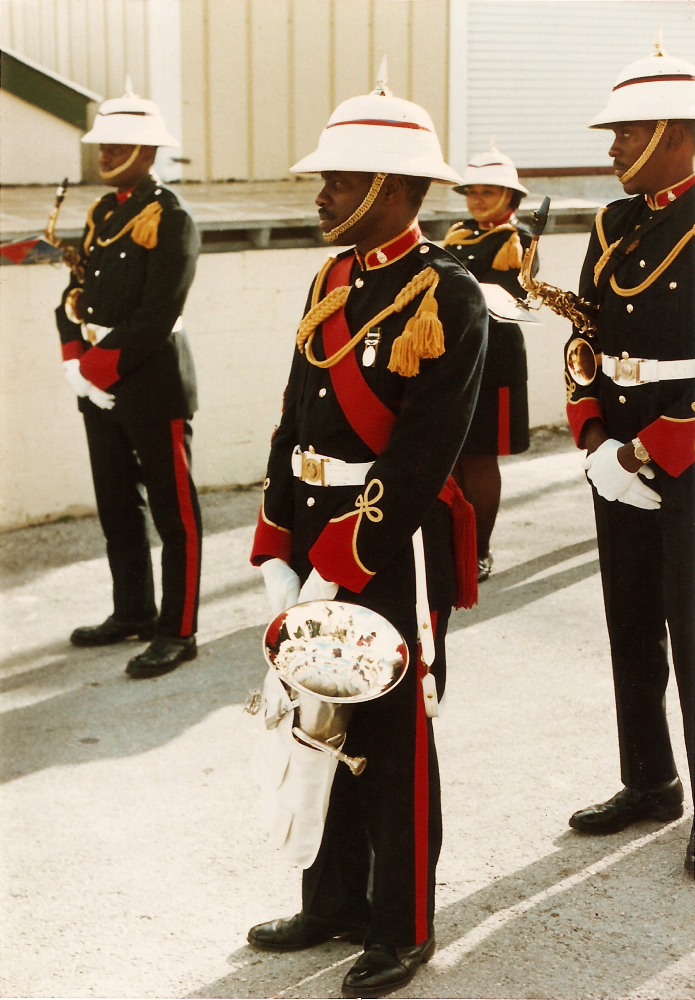
Royal Bermuda Regiment Bandsmen in No. 1 uniform with red facings.

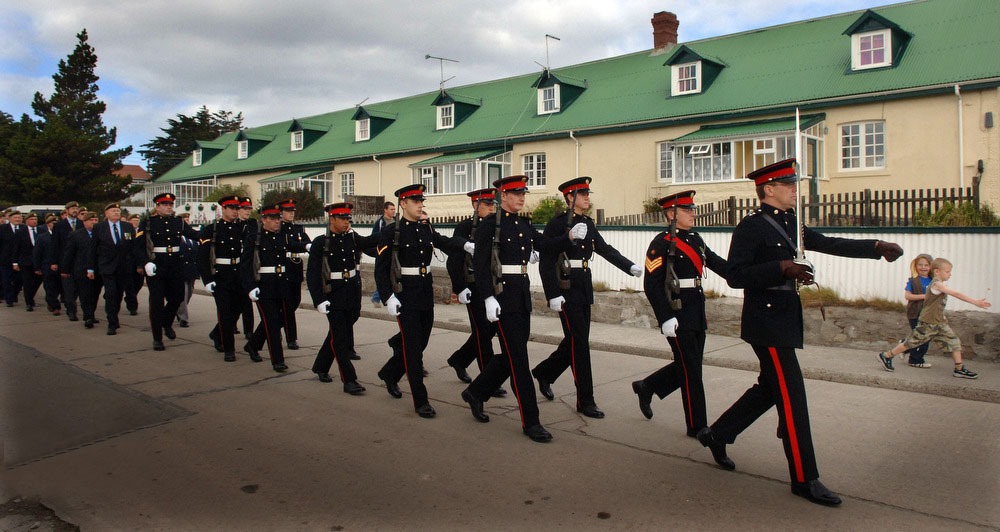
Detachment of the Falkland Islands Defence Force in No. 1 dress
Officers

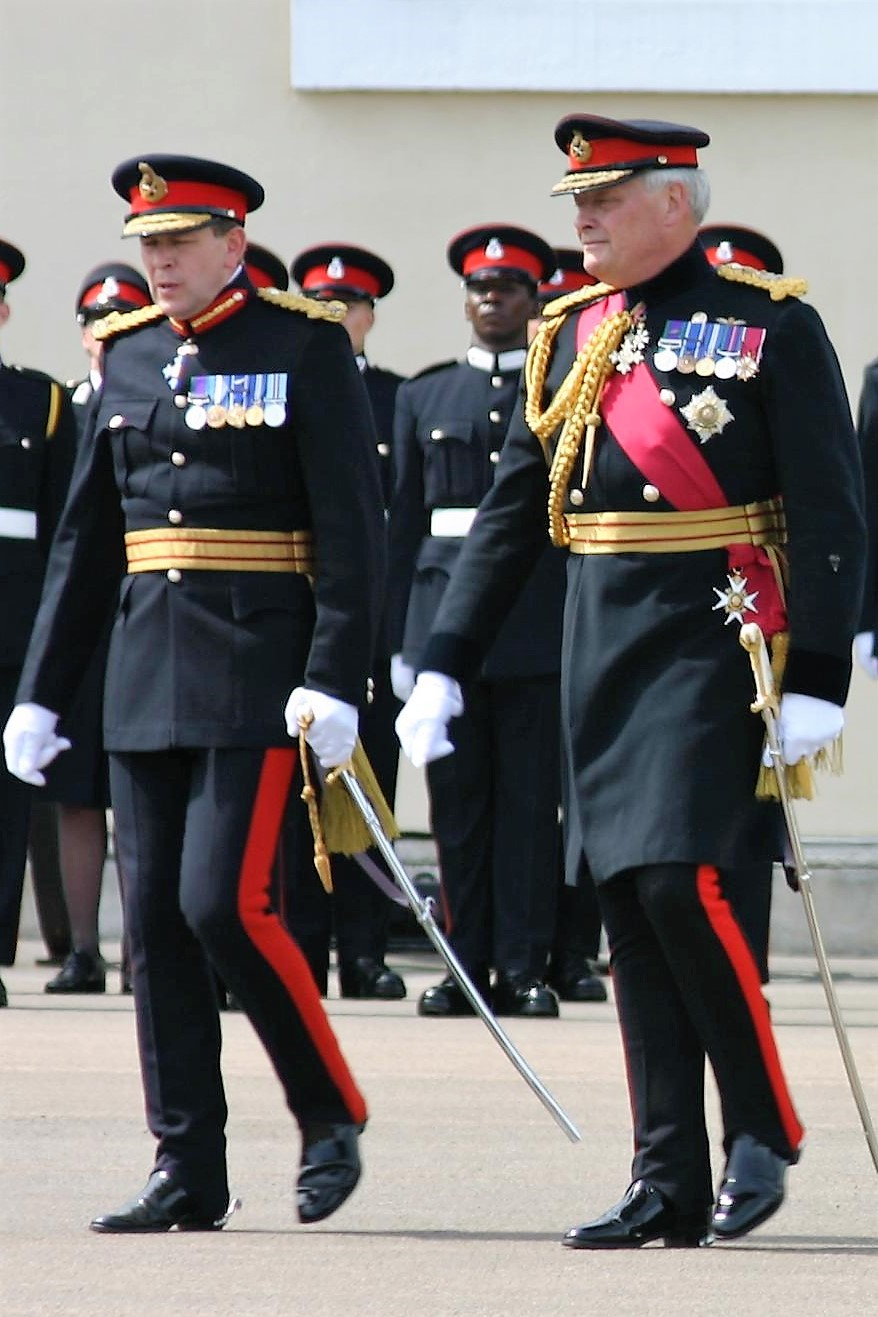
General officers wearing No. 1 dress (left) and Frock coat (right) at the Sovereign's Parade, Sandhurst.

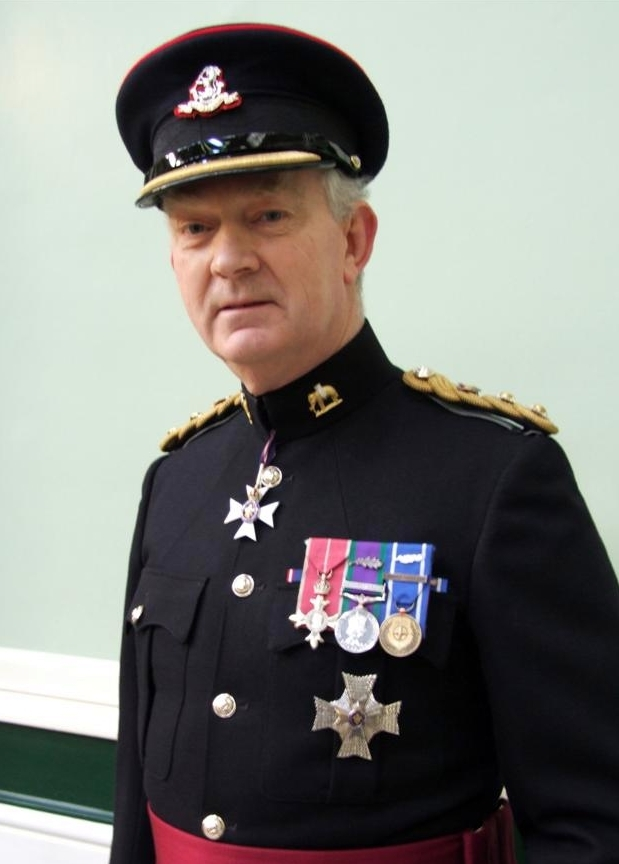
Colonel of a regiment wearing No. 1 dress regimental uniform (Duke of Wellington's Regiment).

=== No. 2: Service dress (temperate parade uniform) ===
Officers'

Other ranks'

British Army No. 2 dress (Royal Yorkshire Regiment)

Originally issued as a field uniform, this uniform is worn for most formal duties by all units. No. 2 dress consists, for most corps and regiments, of a khaki jacket, shirt and tie with trousers or a skirt. Coloured trousers are worn by some units: crimson by the King's Royal Hussars, dark green by the Royal Irish Regiment and Royal Dragoon Guards.

All officers and other ranks now wear the same style and colour of Service Dress and it is issued free to all. Officers are required to purchase the caps, belts and shoes for which they are given a cash grant. The only variations of the standard jacket are the jackets worn by the Foot Guards whose buttons are grouped differently depending on their regiment, and the Royal Regiment of Scotland who wear a "cutaway" form of the jacket to be worn with kilts. Officers wear brown leather gloves with this order of dress.

Regimental distinctions worn on No. 2 dress can include collar badges (sometimes with coloured cloth backings), coloured lanyards worn on the shoulder, arm badges, and unusually for the Educational and Training Services Branch blue socks are worn.

Regimental buttons are worn; for most units, these are of gold colour, with black buttons worn by The Rifles, Royal Gurkha Rifles, Royal Irish Regiment and Royal Army Chaplains Department, silver by the Special Air Service, Special Reconnaissance Regiment, Honourable Artillery Company and Small Arms School Corps and bronze by the Princess of Wales's Royal Regiment. Officers and Warrant Officers Class One of some (but not all) regiments and corps wear a leather Sam Browne belt (that of 1st The Queen's Dragoon Guards is of pig skin which is not to be highly polished) or a cross belt. Infantry Warrant Officers Class Two and SNCOs wear a scarlet (for WOs) or crimson (for SNCOs) sash over the right shoulder to the hip. Soldiers wear a white or black plastic waist belt with a plate buckle displaying the regimental badge in ceremonial uniform – a plain khaki belt in non-ceremonial.

Every regular army soldier is issued with one suit of No. 2 dress. In general, issue of this order of dress to units of the Army Reserves is to all officers and SNCOs with pools of khaki uniforms being held by units for use by corporals and below.

In the ceremonial form of No. 2 dress, the headdress is the same as that worn with No. 1 dress, with the exceptions of the Brigade of Gurkhas (who wear the slouch hat); and of officers of The Queen's Royal Hussars who wear their "tent hat" (the only headdress worn without a cap badge or other distinction).

On "informal parades" officers in Nos 2 or 6 dress may wear a peaked khaki cap (which may also be worn with Nos 4, 7, 12, 13 and 14 dress); this item is not generally issued to other ranks (who would wear the beret or equivalent on these occasions) except those in HCMR and King's Troop RHA. Properly named, this is called the 'Service Dress Cap'. The Khaki Cap is an officer’s private purchase item for use primarily with Service Dress on informal parades. Its association with Barrack Dress is a secondary one: in many units a Cap Field Service (side hat) is preferred for Barrack Dress. This is also a private purchase item. The only Regiments that wear a Forage Cap of any description but do not regularly include a Service Dress Hat as an article of Service Dress are the Queen’s Royal Hussars and the Brigade of Ghurkas. (Of course 'bereted' regiments and Corps (eg the Parachute Regiment, AAC) do not wear caps of any description.)

Another item of headwear authorized (but not provided) for optional wear on informal parades in Nos 2 or 6 dress is the side cap; it may also optionally be worn with Nos 4, 6, 7, 10, 11, 13 and 14 dress.

No. 2 dress

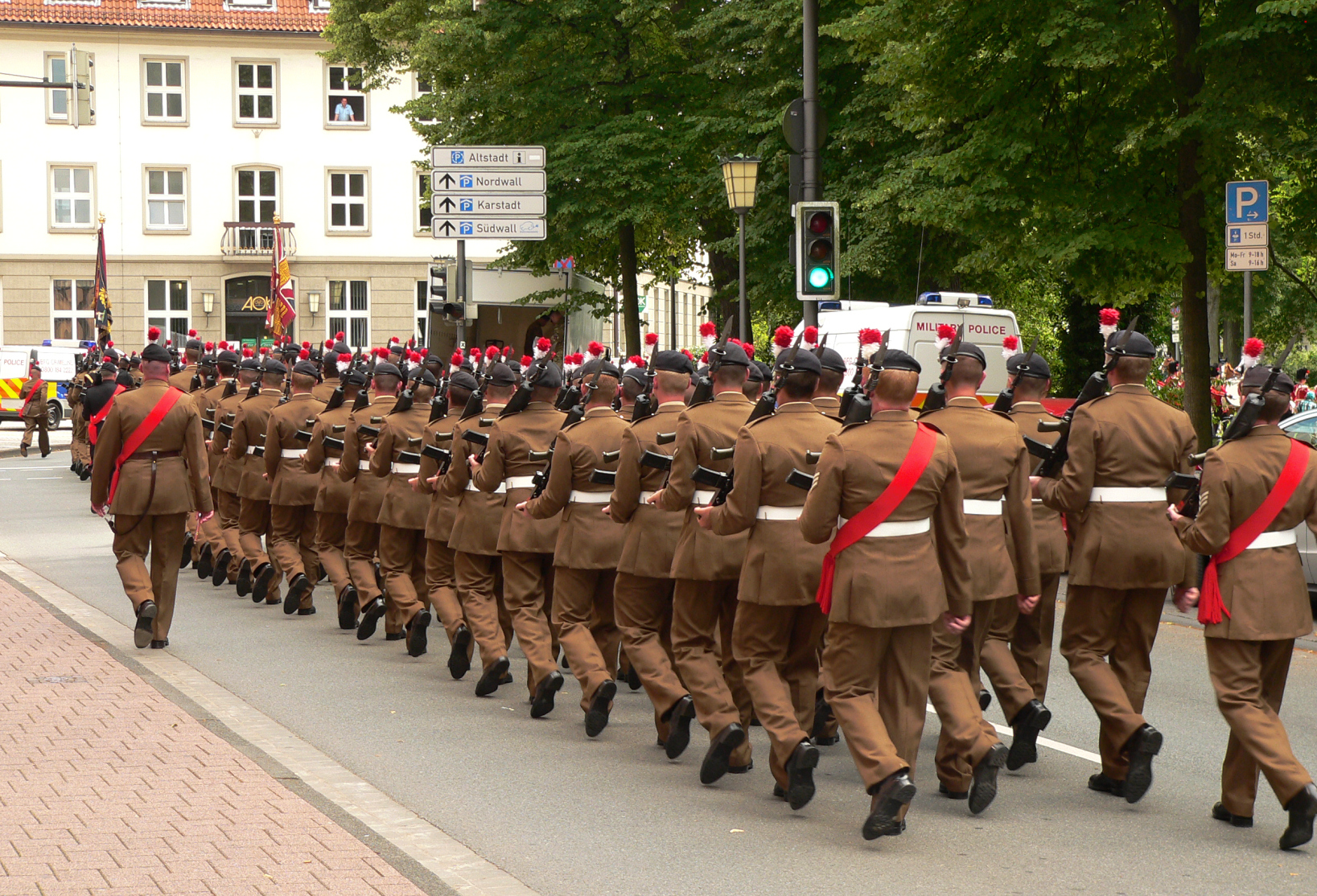
Royal Regiment of Fusiliers

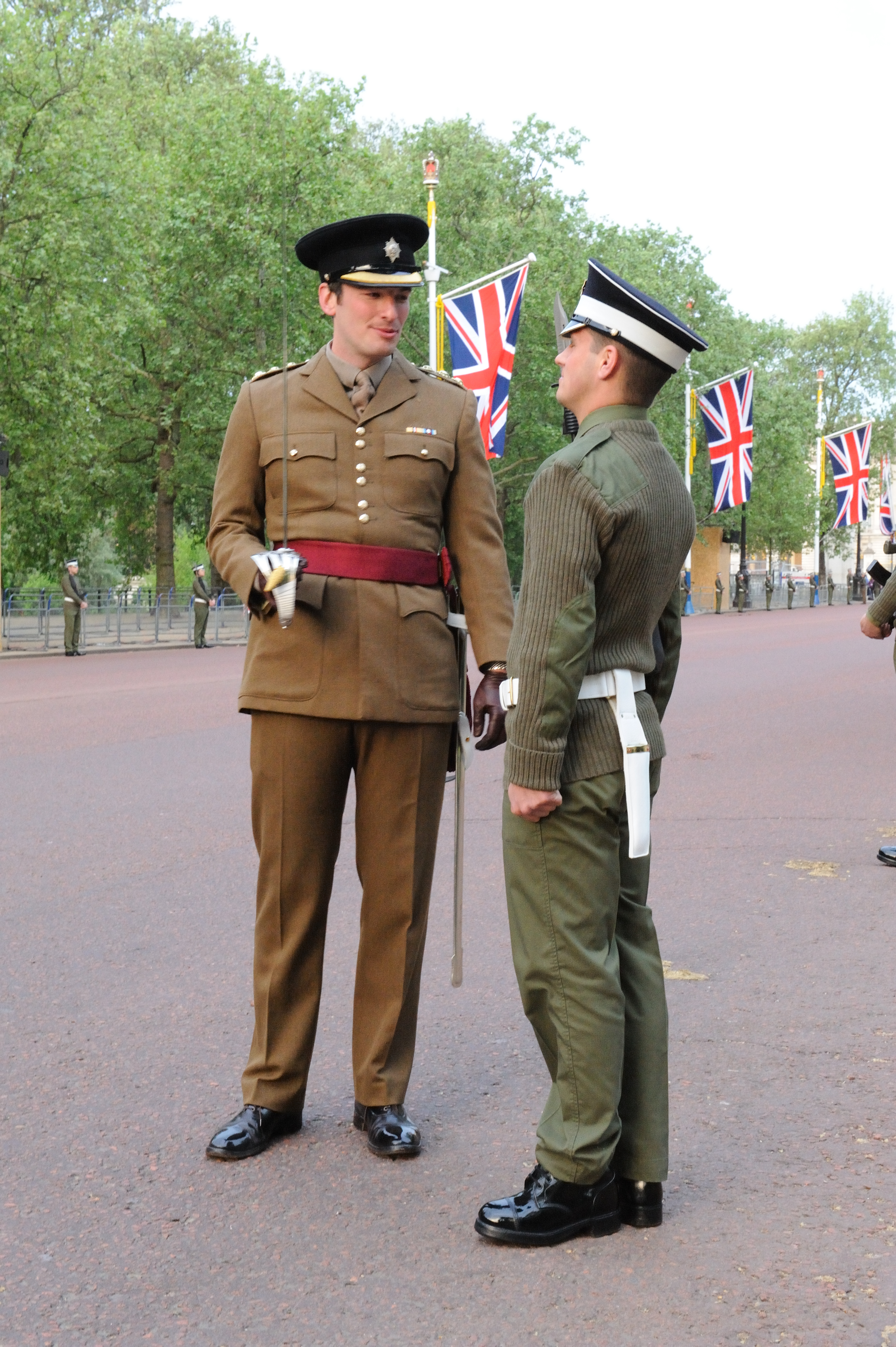
Coldstream Guards officer in No. 2 dress; guardsman wears a form of No. 13 dress

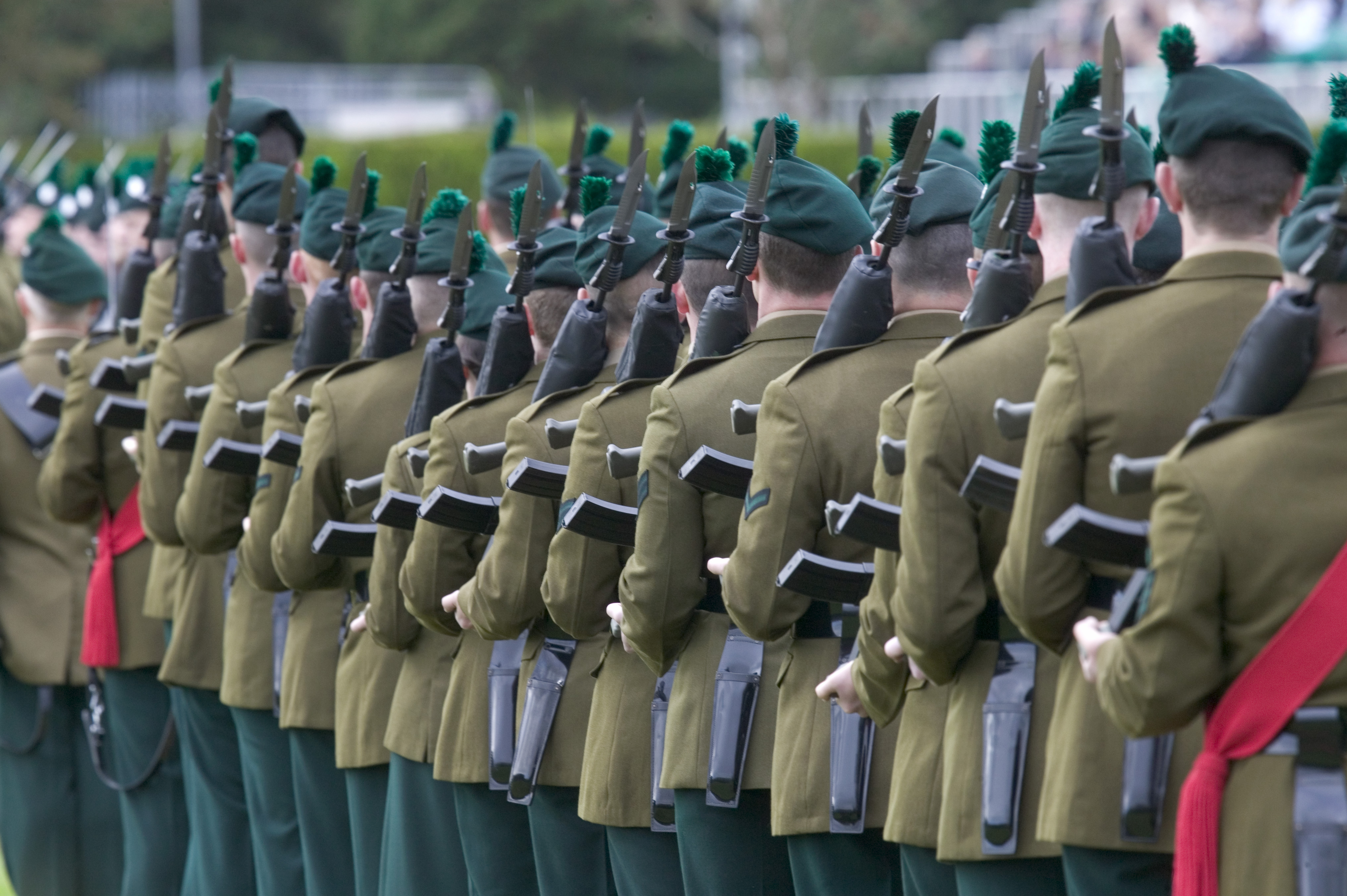
Royal Irish Regiment No. 2, with distinctive "piper green" trousers, caubeen and hackle

=== No. 3: Warm weather ceremonial uniform ===
Officers'

Other ranks'

British Army No. 3 dress

No. 3 dress is the warm weather equivalent of No. 1 dress, worn for specified overseas stations or assignments. With the introduction of No. 1 dress in temperate regions, No. 3 dress was adopted as the tropical equivalent during the early 1950s. It comprised an all-white cotton drill high-collared tunic, cut in a similar fashion to the No. 1 dress jacket, plus white trousers. These were worn with the coloured No. 1 dress cap. No. 3 dress was typically issued temporarily, being withdrawn from units on leaving the station. This order of dress dates back to white drill uniforms worn for "hot-weather" ceremonial and off-duty wear in India prior to World War I.

Since the 1970s this order has consisted of the same white tunic but is now worn with coloured No. 1 dress trousers. Head-dress, footwear and badges are generally as for No. 1 dress. Widely worn during the 1950s and 1960s (when Britain still maintained significant garrisons in tropical stations) this uniform is now usually restricted to military attachés in tropical postings and their personal staffs; units of the Royal Gibraltar Regiment and The Royal Bermuda Regiment (see below); plus a few army bands and officers of the battalion of the Royal Gurkha Rifles stationed in Brunei.

The band of the Royal Gibraltar Regiment is entitled to a permanent issue of No. 3 dress. The Royal Bermuda Regiment, which has many ceremonial duties, issued No. 3 dress as a summer uniform until the end of the millennium, wearing No. 1 dress (with red facings) during the rest of the year due to the cold and often stormy weather (a black Slade–Wallace belt being worn with No. 3 dress whereas a white one is worn with No. 1 dress). As most of its public ceremonial duties fall during the summer months, it now wears No. 3 dress year-round, with No. 1 dress worn only as authorized by the commanding officer.

No. 3: Warm Weather Dress

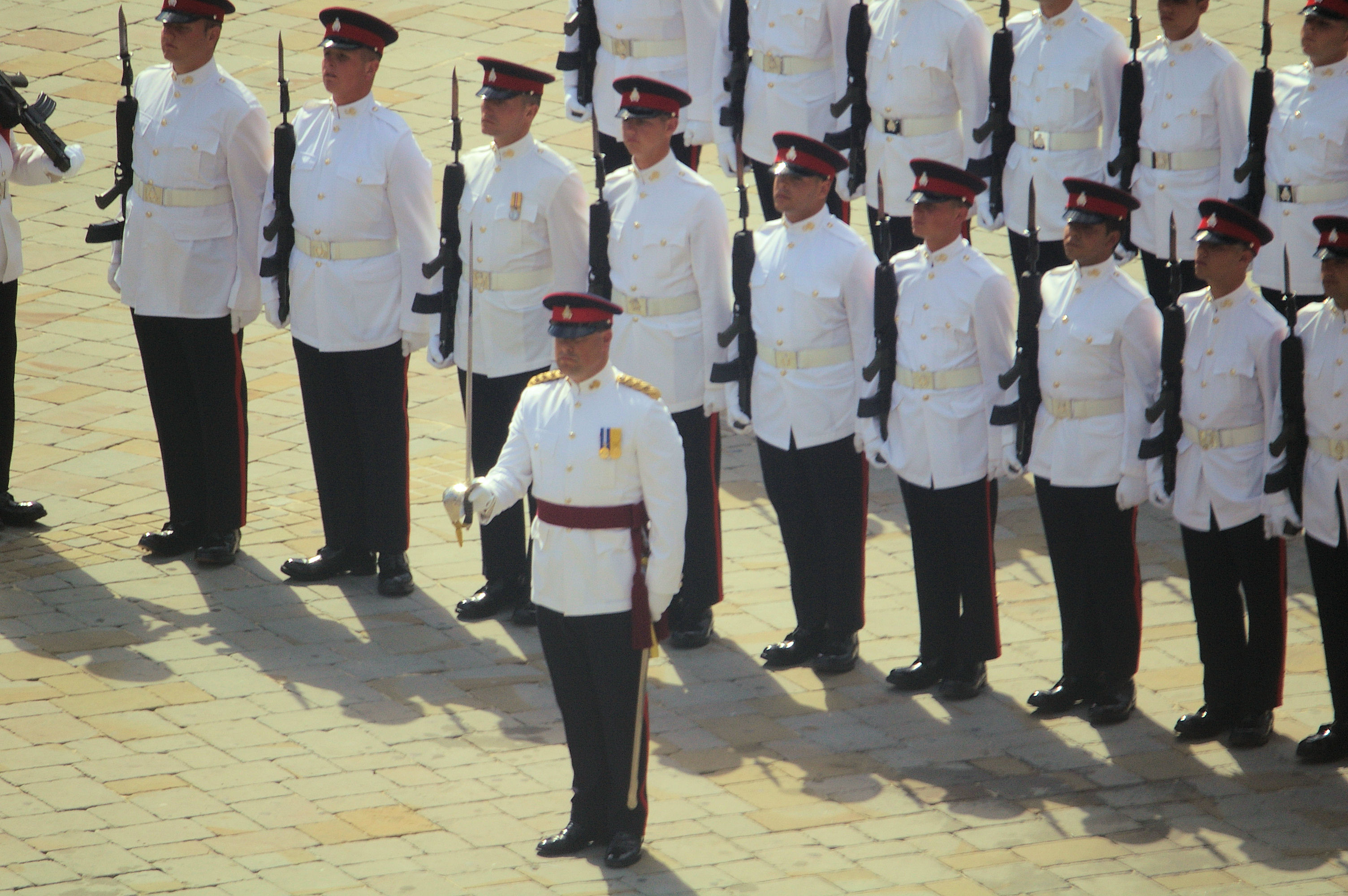
The Royal Gibraltar Regiment at the parade for the Queen's Birthday (Trooping the Colour), Grand Casemates Square, Gibraltar in No. 3 dress

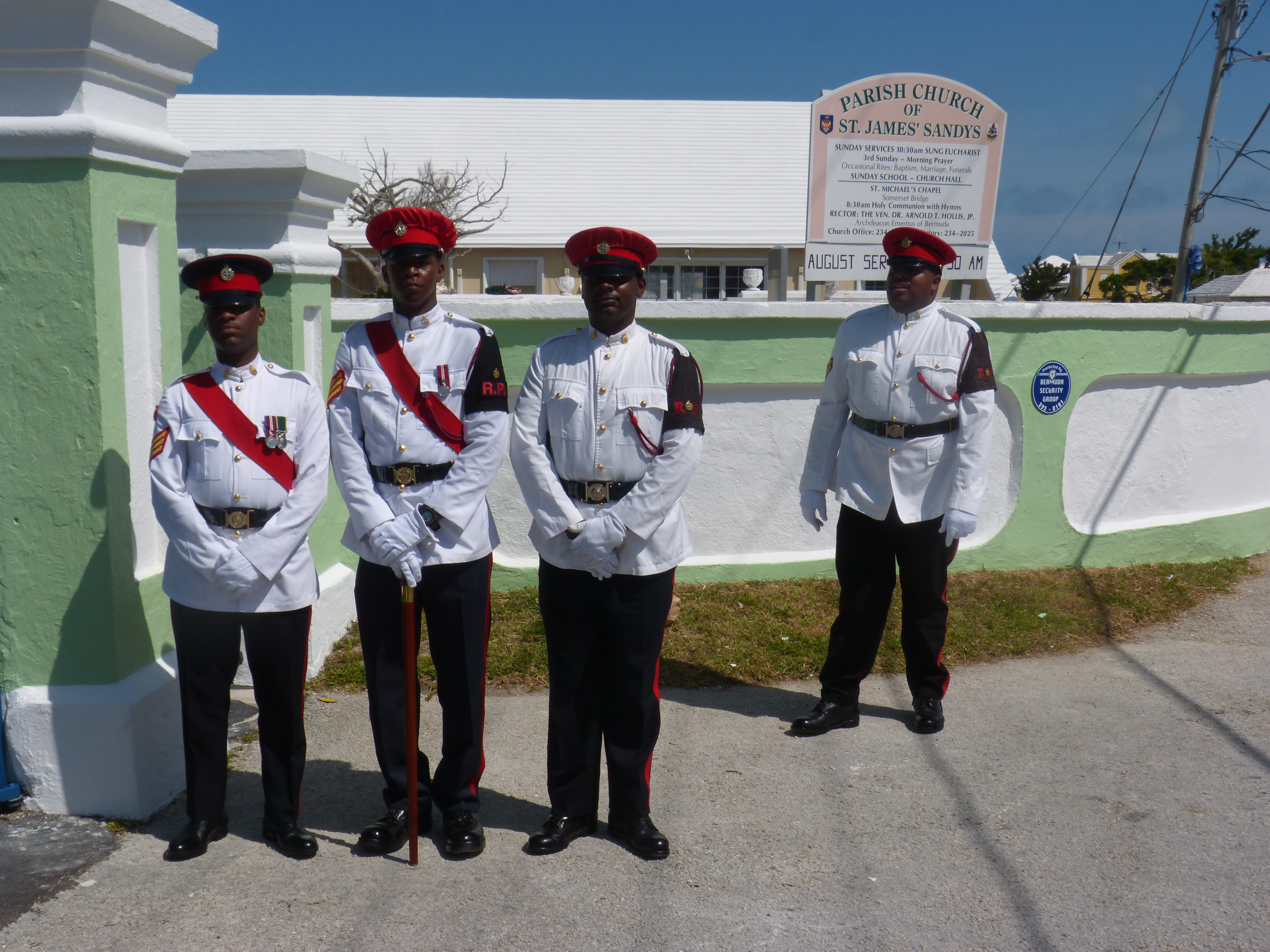
Royal Bermuda Regiment at St James' Church in Somerset in No. 3 dress

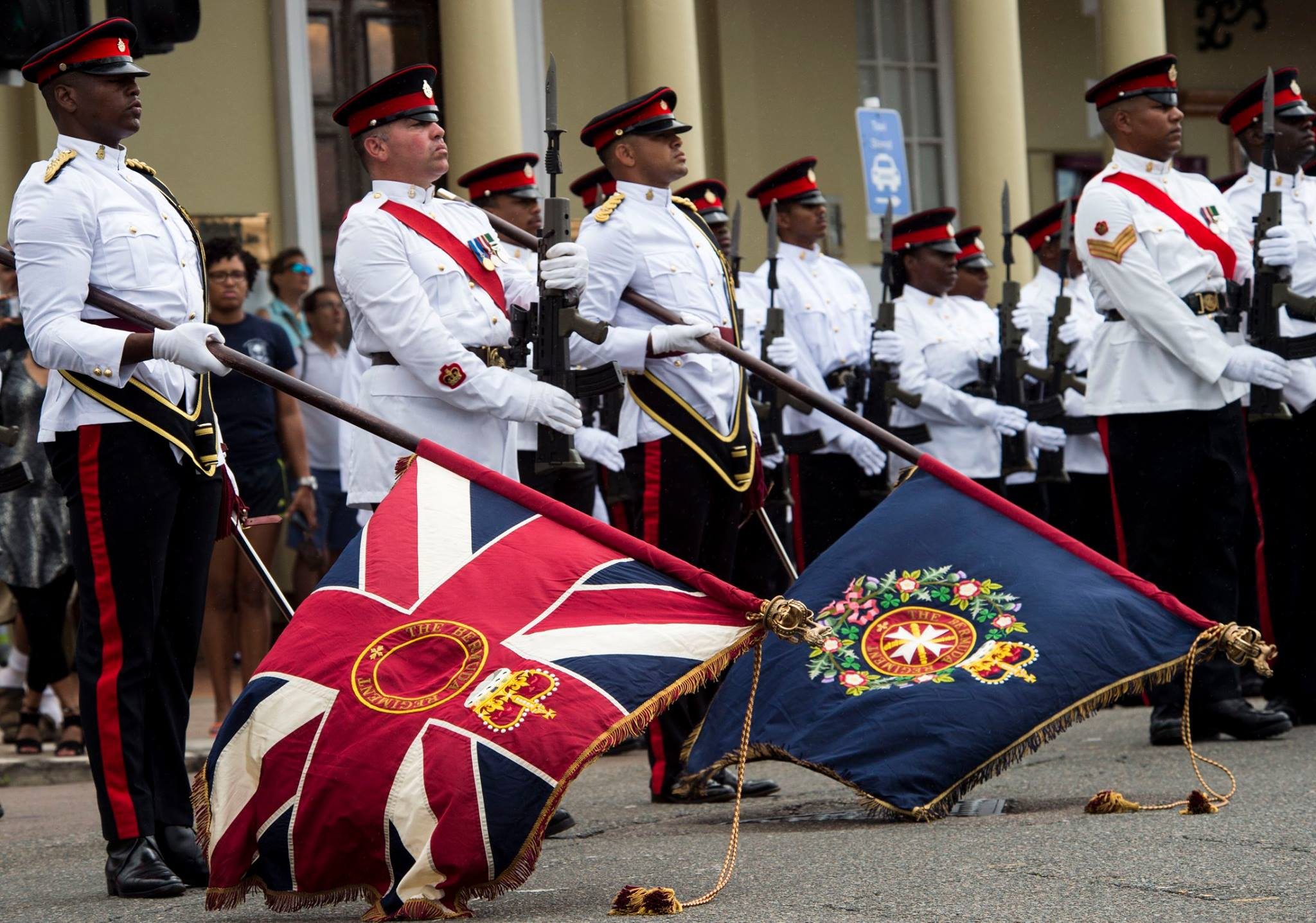
Royal Bermuda Regiment in No. 3 dress at Queen's Birthday Parade on 10 June 2017

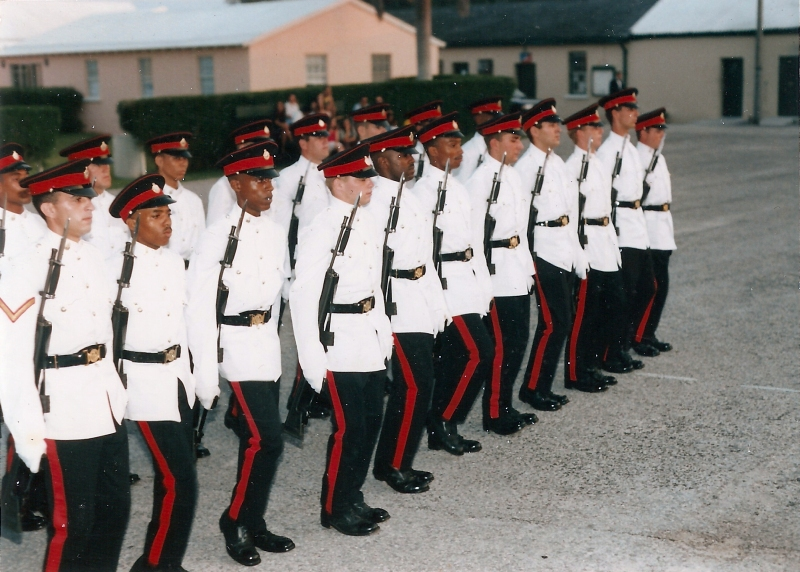
Potential Non-Commissioned Officers (PNCO) Cadre promotion parade in No. 3 (summer) Dress at Warwick Camp in June, 1994.

=== No. 4: Warm weather service dress (officers only) ===
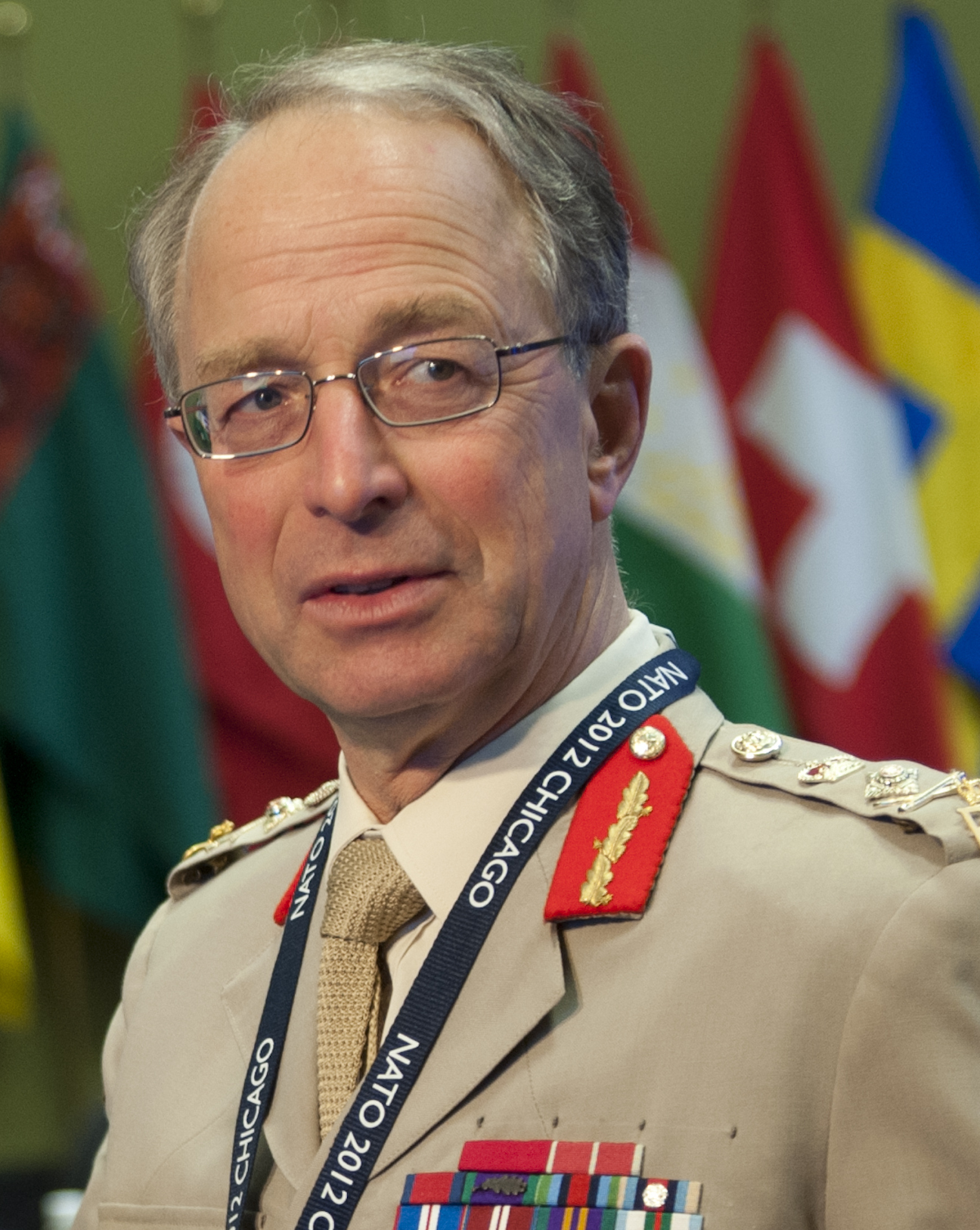
No. 4 dress, worn by David Richards, Baron Richards of Herstmonceux, British Chief of the Defence Staff, at a NATO summit

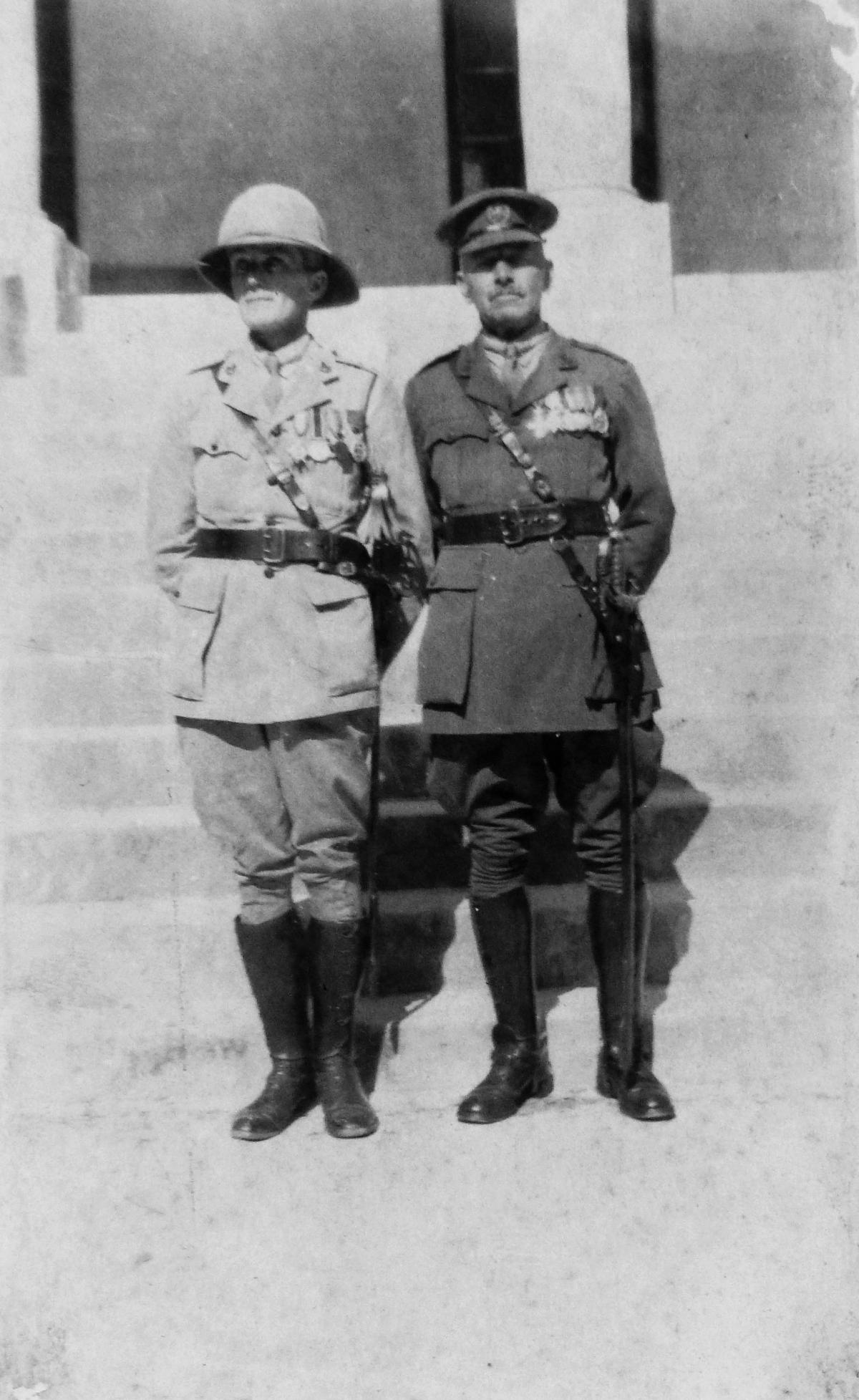
Major RC Earl and Lieut-Col. RJ Tucker, Bermuda Volunteer Rifle Corps, Armistice Day, 1930, in warm weather and temperate officers' Service Dress

Issued to officers on first posting to a warm-weather area: the uniform is similar to No. 2 dress but made in a light khaki shade defined in Section 01.87 of the Army Dress Regulations as "stone".

When officers are taking part in parades and formations with other ranks in warm weather areas, they wear either No. 3 or No. 6 dress.

There had been an Other Ranks pattern of warm weather Service Dress, but this fell out of use after the 1950s.

=== No. 6: Warm weather parade uniform (bush jacket) ===
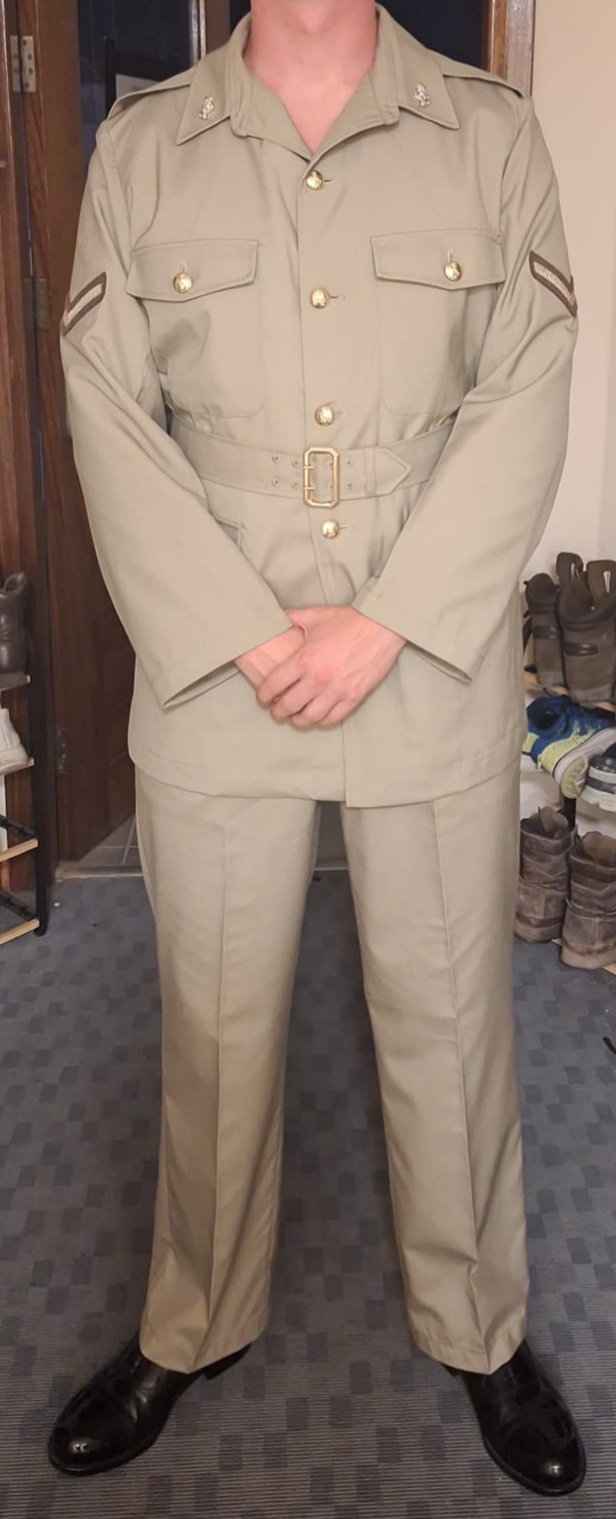
No. 6 dress

The "bush jacket" uniform (in Australia, this is known as the "safari uniform"). It is issued to all officers and ORs on posting to a warm-weather station. It consists of a stone coloured bush-style four-button jacket worn with or without a shirt and tie underneath and stone coloured trousers. It is worn by all ranks for parades (as with No. 2 dress), unless No. 3 dress is worn, and by ORs for all other occasions.

=== No. 7: Warm weather barrack dress ===
The tropical shirt-and-trousers uniform, consisting of a stone coloured short-sleeve shirt worn with stone coloured trousers (tartan kilt or trews for Scottish regiments), and regimental headgear. Regimental/Corps stable belts may be worn in this order of dress.

=== No. 8: Combat dress ===
Officers

Other ranks

British Army No. 8 Combat Dress (Royal Yorkshire Regiment)

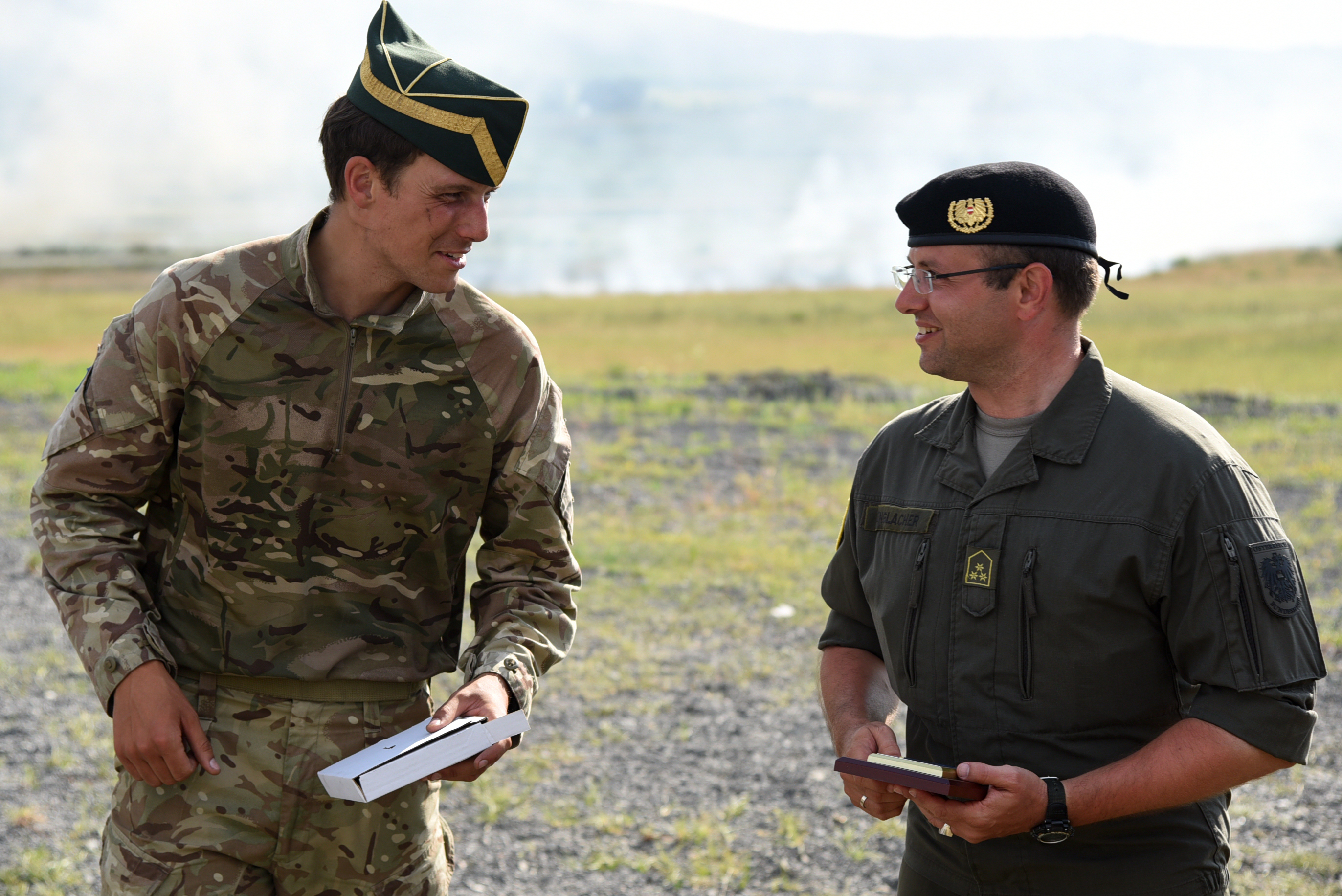
A British officer, left, of the Queen's Royal Hussars wearing a Tent Hat with No. 8 dress.

The current No. 8 dress, which was introduced as part of Project PECOC in 2011, is known as Personal Clothing System – Combat Uniform (PCS-CU); it is based around a Multi-Terrain Pattern (MTP) windproof smock, a lightweight jacket and trousers with a range of ancillaries such as thermals and waterproofs. Prior to 2011 separate designs of combat dress were provided for use in desert, temperate and tropical regions (numbered 5, 8 and 9, respectively, in the uniform regulations) all of which were replaced by PCS-CU.

PCS-CU is designed to be lightweight, yet durable enough to be used throughout rigorous activities soldiers find themselves performing, and with the idea that layers of clothing are warmer and more flexible than a single thick layer. The PCS-CU jacket is always worn loose, with sleeves rolled down; however, an MTP pattern shirt was introduced in 2015 and this may be worn with sleeves rolled up or down as per the individual's discretion.

Some regiments and corps wear a stable belt in No. 8 dress whilst others restrict its use to No. 13 and 14 dress. On exercises and operations the stable belt is replaced with a plain green field belt, with nylon personal load carrying equipment and the Osprey body armour vest with pouches attached using the PALS system being worn for load-bearing purposes.

In the twentieth century the British army introduced Tactical Recognition Flashes (TRFs) – worn on the right arm of a combat uniform, this distinctive insignia denotes the wearer's regiment or corps (or subdivision thereof, these being the ALS, ETS, RMP, MPGS, and SPS, in the case of the AGC).

All personnel in 16 Air Assault Brigade, regardless of parent cap-badge, wear a 3x3” Drop Zone Flash where a TRF would normally be placed on the left arm. These DZ Flashes are allocated on the basis of unit, not of cap-badge. These DZ flashes are set by Bde HQ. In most instances they are unrelated to the unit’s ‘Corps TRF’. This comes from the heritage of the Parachute Brigades, but also provides an important tactical identification function. e.g. the Commander of 16 Bde is on the General Staff yet wears the DZ Flash of the Bde HQ, AGC (SPS) personnel and Company medics wear the DZ flash of the Unit into which they have been assigned (eg 7RHA, 3PARA, 16MED).

Working headdress is normally worn, which is typically a beret. The colour of the beret usually shows what type of regiment the wearer is from. The colours are as follows:

- Khaki: Mercian Regiment, Foot Guards, Honourable Artillery Company (before 2026), Princess of Wales's Royal Regiment, Royal Anglian Regiment, Duke of Lancaster's Regiment, Royal Welsh, Royal Yorkshire Regiment, Royal Gibraltar Regiment, 4/73 (Sphinx) Special Observation Post Battery RA
- Light grey: Royal Scots Dragoon Guards, Scottish and North Irish Yeomanry
- Brown: King's Royal Hussars, Royal Wessex Yeomanry
- Black: Royal Tank Regiment, Westminster Dragoons Squadron, Royal Yeomanry
- Dark (Rifle) green: The Royal Dragoon Guards, The Queen's Royal Hussars (with broad browband), The Rifles, Royal Gurkha Rifles, Small Arms School Corps, Essex Yeomanry
- Maroon: Parachute Regiment, all ranks serving with 16 Air Assault Brigade (not restricted to Parachute qualified personnel) other than the non–Parachute Regiment Infantry Battalion or Army Air Corps and attached Arms personnel, A Battery, Honourable Artillery Company (from 2026).
- Beige: Special Air Service including attached troops who are not SAS-qualified
- Emerald grey: Special Reconnaissance Regiment
- Atholl Grey: Royal Army Medical Service.
- Commando green: Commando qualified personnel serving in Commando units (including the Special Boat Service)
- Cypress green: Intelligence Corps
- Cambridge blue: Army Air Corps including attached personnel and REME Aircraft trades, 47 Regiment Royal Artillery any army personnel serving in an aviation unit.
- Scarlet: Royal Military Police
- Green: Adjutant General's Corps (except Royal Military Police, who wear scarlet; Military Provost Staff, Educational and Training Services Branch and Army Legal Service, who wear navy blue), Military Provost Guard Service
- Dark blue: all other Army units (except Scottish line infantry regiments and the Royal Irish Regiment who wear the Tam O'Shanter and the Caubeen respectively)

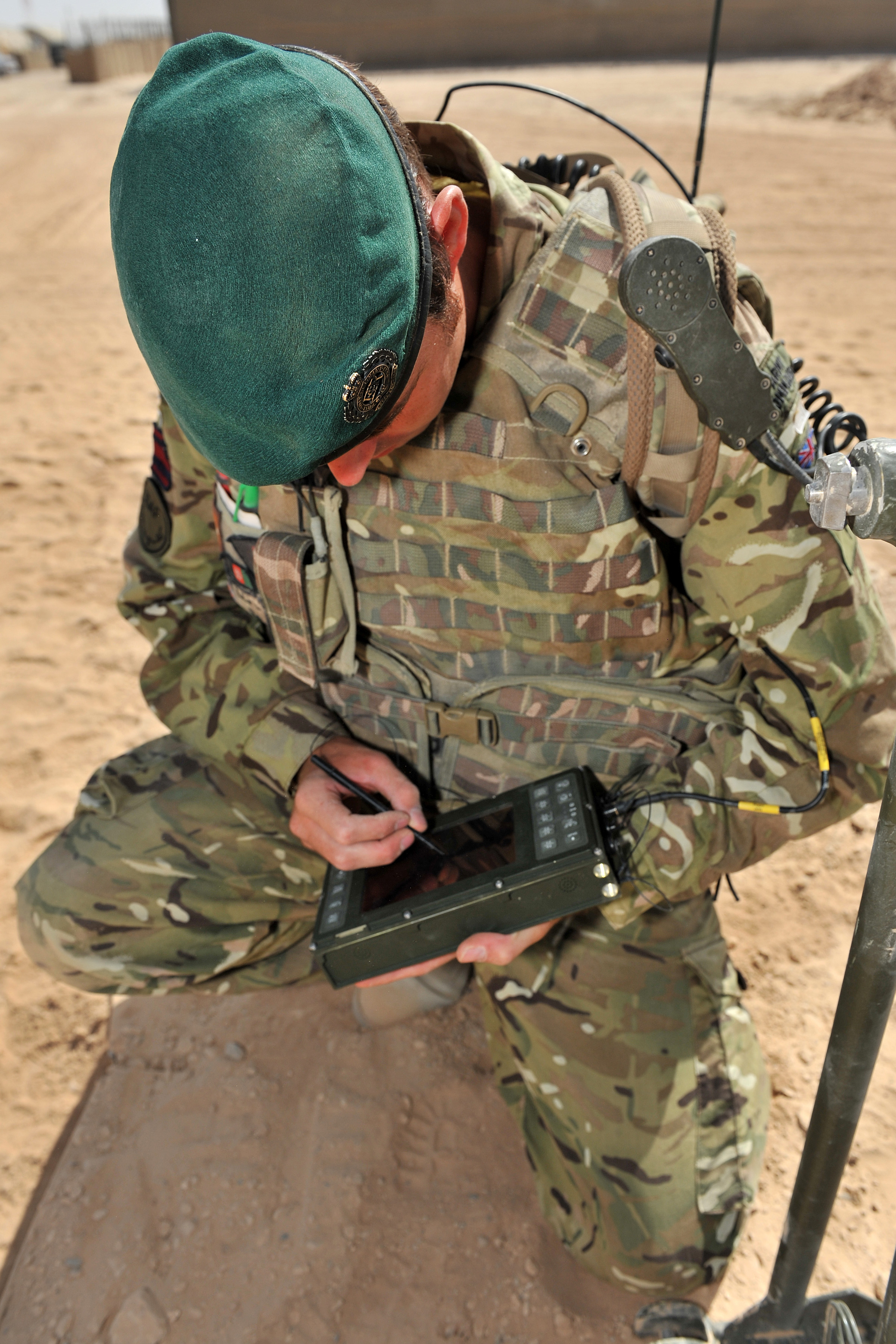
Soldiers of 24 Commando (Engineer) Regiment wear the Royal Engineer cap badge on a green Commando beret.

A regiment or corps cap badge is worn on the beret or other headdress worn in No. 8 dress. The badge is positioned above the left eye when a beret or a caubeen is worn; the badge worn on the Tam O'Shanter sits above the left ear. Uniquely D (London Irish Rifles) Company of The London Regiment wear their cap badge over the right eye, on their caubeen. Troops from other services, regiments or corps on attachment to units with distinctive coloured berets often wear the latter with their own cap badge. Colonels, brigadiers and generals usually continue to wear the beret of the regiment or corps to which they used to belong with the cap badge distinctive to their rank.

The Royal Regiment of Fusiliers wears a feather hackle on the beret, they are now the only infantry regiment to wear the navy blue beret. Hackles are also worn by other regiments with Fusilier heritage: e.g. other ranks of the Royal Welsh wear white hackles on their berets (inherited from the Royal Welch Fusiliers).

The Royal Regiment of Scotland and the Royal Irish Regiment, instead of the beret, wear the Tam O'Shanter and the caubeen respectively, both of which feature hackles. The Tam O'Shanter is also worn by some UOTCs and Army Reserve units in Scotland.

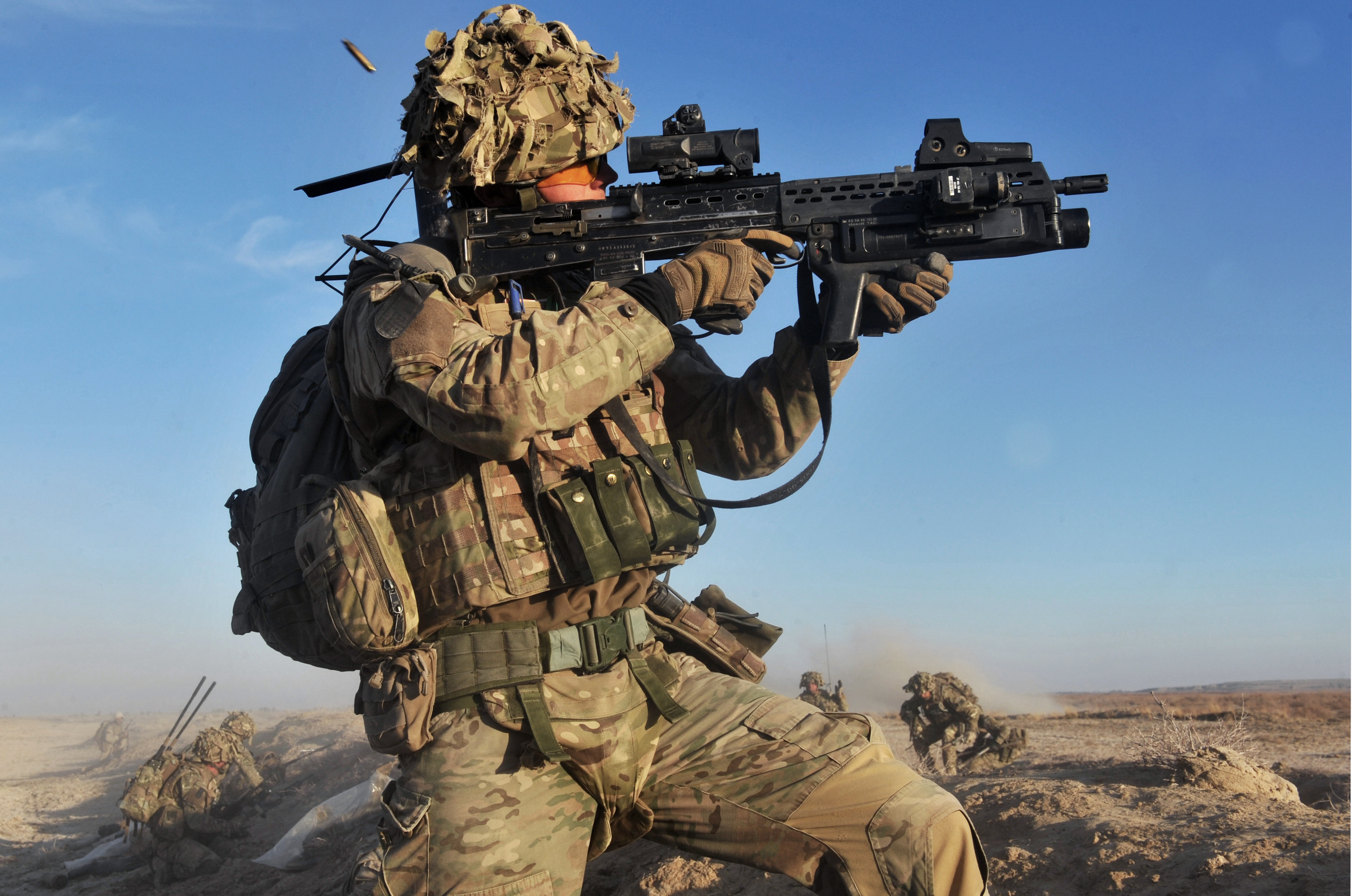
Soldier of 4th Mechanised Brigade in Afghanistan, 2013.

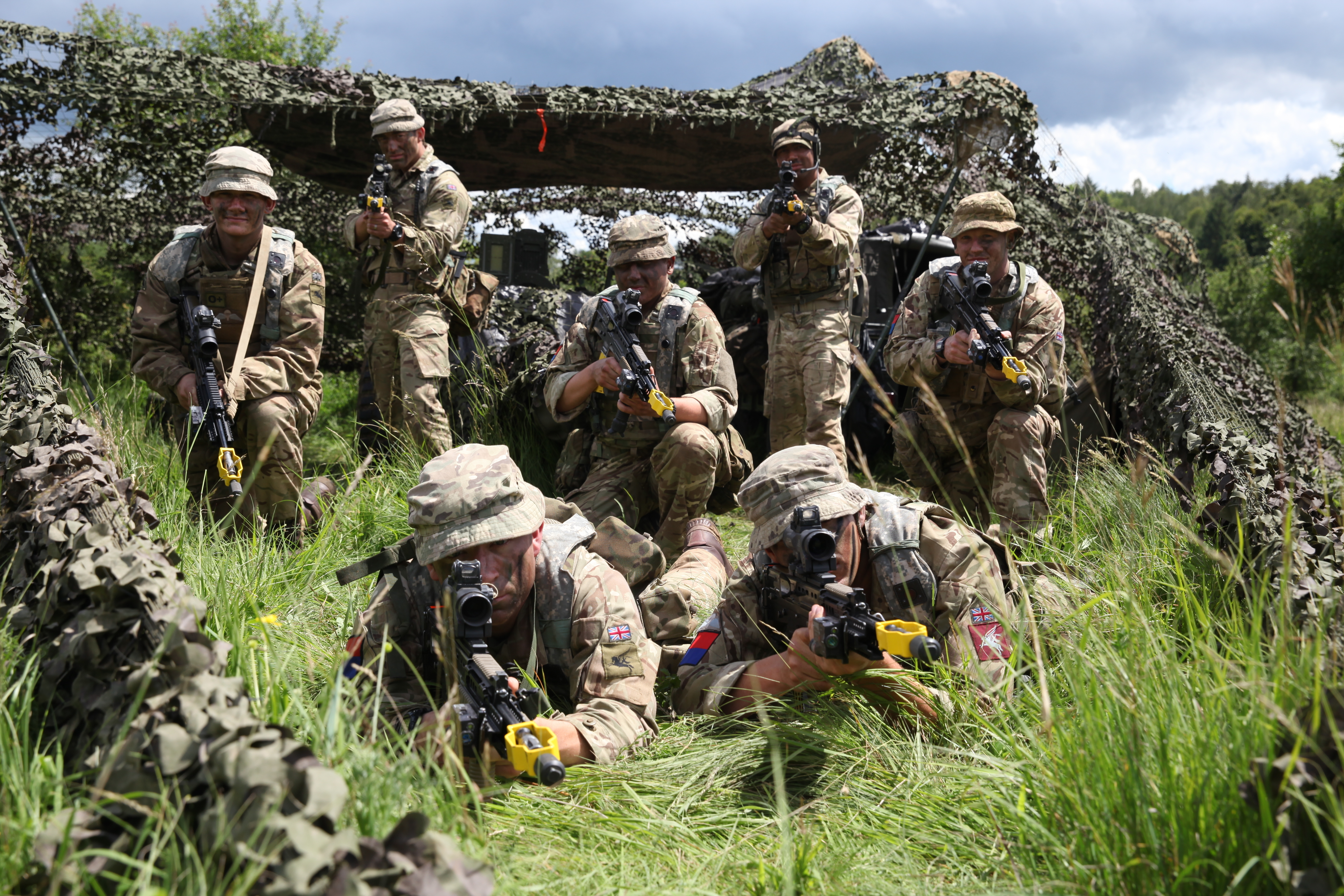
7th Parachute Regiment Royal Horse Artillery training in Germany in 2016

Prior to the adoption of PCS-CU, the beret was often substituted by the Mk 6 Combat Helmet with a DPM cover (or desert DPM if worn with No. 5 dress); this has since been replaced by the Mk 7 helmet with an MTP cover and some scrim netting for the insertion of additional camouflage. In jungle conditions, the helmet is usually substituted by an MTP bush hat – or equally, in cold conditions, an MTP peaked hat (Cap, Extreme Cold Weather), a rolled woollen tube known as a cap comforter, or other specialized headgear. When the British Army finds itself in peacekeeping roles, regimental headdress is worn (where the tactical situation allows) in preference to the helmet or MTP hat, in order to appear less hostile to local civilians. When working for the United Nations, soldiers will wear the pale blue UN beret.

=== No. 10: Temperate mess dress ===
Officers'

Other ranks'

British Army No. 10 Mess Dress (Royal Yorkshire Regiment)

The British Army's temperate mess dress includes a waist-length short jacket, with which men wear trousers, overalls or a kilt; and for women a long skirt. No. 10 dress is normally worn by sergeants and above for formal evening functions. Colours vary greatly from unit to unit but generally match those of the traditional full dress of the regiment or corps. Thus mess jackets can be scarlet, dark blue or green with facings and waistcoats in regimental colours. Two basic patterns of jacket are worn: the high collared "cavalry" style and the open-fronted one with lapels formerly worn by officers of infantry regiments. The version of No. 10 dress worn by officers frequently includes elaborate braiding on the waistcoats.

Mess dress was derived from the shell jacket (infantry) or stable jacket (cavalry): a short, working jacket in full-dress colours, which 19th-century officers paired with a uniform waistcoat for evening wear.

=== No. 11: Warm weather mess dress ===
A white jacket is substituted for the coloured one of temperate mess dress. Waistcoats are not worn.

=== No. 12: Protective clothing ===
This order of dress includes various types of protective clothing ranging from the standard overalls to specialist kit worn by aircrews, chefs, medics and others.

No. 12 also covers whatever day-to-day working dress may be authorised at a local or regimental level. Formerly an olive green shirt and trousers were often worn, but this has been replaced with combat dress shirt and trousers worn with beret and stable belt (identical to that of No. 7 dress).

=== No. 13: Temperate barrack dress ===
Officers

Other ranks

British Army No. 13/14 Barrack Dress (Royal Yorkshire Regiment)

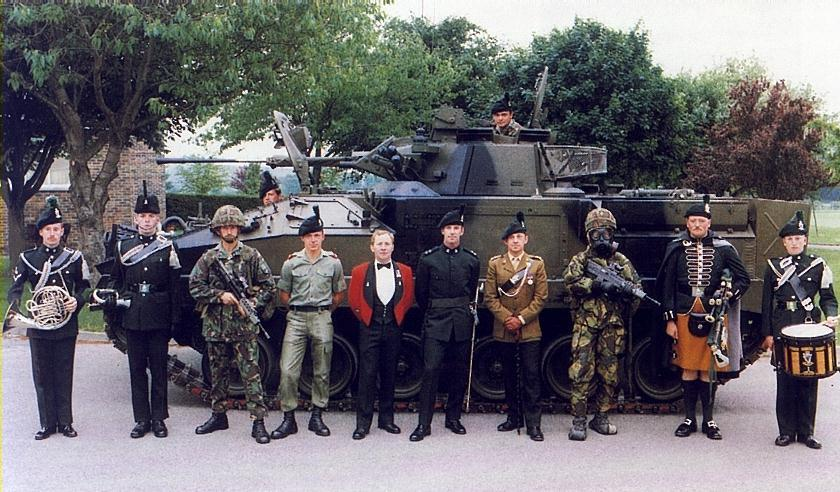
Royal Irish Rangers: soldiers and officers in Numbers 8, 14, 10, 1, 2 and 12 orders of dress, flanked by a bandsman, bugler, piper and drummer in versions of (rifles) full-dress.

In 2018 it was announced that although No. 13 and 14 dress remain an authorised order of dress to be worn on appropriate occasions, barrack dress trousers, skirts and short-sleeved shirts were to be withdrawn. This does not mean that Corps are authorised to remove No. 13 dress from their Corps order of dress. In reality, outside London District, it is mostly worn by officers, for example by Directing Staff at the Royal Military Academy Sandhurst.

It consists of khaki barrack dress trousers (as issued under the Future Army Dress (FAD) programme) and the standard issued shirt from No. 2 dress with a pullover sweater. The stable belt, a wide belt made of tough woven fabric, is often worn. The fabric of the belt itself is in regimental colours, either a single colour or striped along its length (the origin of these combinations is often traditional, derived from historic uniform colours and facings, and may coincide with the design of a particular unit's TRF). It is traditionally fastened with a set of leather straps and buckles on the wearer's left-hand side (in some units to their front), but may alternatively have a metal locket arrangement, or a plate at the front bearing regimental, or formation insignia. The stable belt is worn over the pullover by some Regiments and Corps.

Some regiments' officers and WOs may wear coloured pullovers in place of the green pattern; the following regimental patterns and colours are authorised:

- Grey/blue v-neck: Royal Scots Dragoon Guards
- Grey/blue/green knit: Queen's Royal Lancers
- Grey/brown v-neck: 1st The Queen's Dragoon Guards
- Grey/green v-neck: Royal Regiment of Fusiliers
- Green v-neck: Princess of Wales's Royal Regiment, 307 (South Nottinghamshire Hussars Yeomanry) Battery RA (V)
- Lincoln green v-neck: 68 (Inns of Court and City Yeomanry) Signal Squadron (V)
- Brunswick Green knitted crew neck: Royal Dragoon Guards
- Dark green: Queen's Royal Hussars
- Brunswick green v-neck: 9th/12th Royal Lancers
- Lovat green v-neck: Royal Yeomanry
- Green fleck v-neck: Royal Wessex Yeomanry
- Lovat green and red fleck v-neck: Essex Yeomanry
- Black: Royal Tank Regiment, Royal Army Chaplains Department, Army Legal Services Branch
- Navy/corvette blue: Royal Artillery
- Dark blue: 94 (Berkshire Yeomanry) Signal Squadron (V)
- Storm blue v-neck: Queen's Own Yeomanry
- Light blue/green fleck: Light Dragoons
- Maroon: Royal Army Veterinary Corps
- Dull cherry v-neck: Royal Army Medical Service
- Brown fleck round neck: King's Royal Hussars
- Buff: Mercian Regiment
- Mid brown v-neck: Royal Mercian and Lancastrian Yeomanry

A regimental pattern coloured side cap may be worn at the commanding officer's discretion. Some warrant officers in a few regiments customarily carry a Pace stick when in this order of dress.

=== No. 14: Short sleeve order ===
As for No. 13, but with the shirt sleeves rolled up to above elbow level or the issued short sleeve barrack dress shirt. The pullover is not worn.

== Obsolete uniforms ==
=== No. 5: Battledress (1939–1961) ===
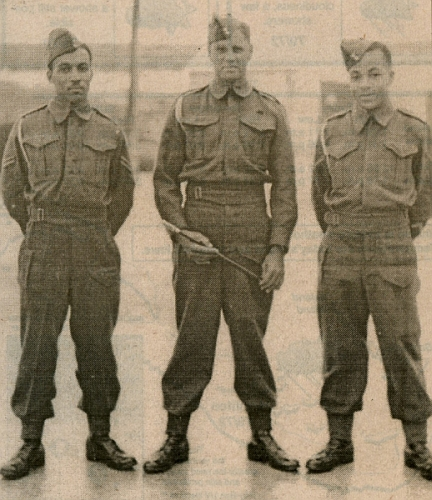
A Warrant Officer and Non-commissioned officers of the Bermuda Militia Artillery wear Battledress at the Examination Battery, St. David's, Bermuda, c. 1944.

Battle dress refers to the combat utility uniform issued from 1939 to the early 1960s that replaced No. 2 service dress. It is often incorrectly called the "pattern 37 uniform" from the pattern of web gear and accessories introduced earlier in 1937. It consisted of a short jacket called a blouse and high-waisted trousers made of khaki wool serge worn with a beret or side-cap. It was also issued in RAF Blue-Grey for the Royal Air Force, Navy Blue for the Royal Navy / Royal Navy Volunteer Reserve and Dark Blue for the Civil Defence Corps. Officers were permitted to have the collar of the BD jacket tailored to have faced lapels, allowing the wearing of a shirt and tie underneath, inspiring the later American M44 "Ike Jacket". Originally introduced in 1939, design modifications were made in 1940 (Austerity Pattern), 1942 (Pattern 40), and 1949 (Pattern 49). It became a barracks and walking-out dress with the introduction of the Jungle Green combat dress uniforms in the mid-1940s and is synonymous with the British soldier of the 1940s and 50s.

Battledress had some drawbacks. The uniform was designed for the temperate climate of the United Kingdom or Northern Europe. It was found too heavy for wear in summer, the sunnier climate of Southern Europe (such as the Mediterranean Theatre) or in tropical or jungle climates (such as the Pacific Theatre). Conversely it was too lightweight for cold weather or high altitudes (such as Korea). It was also very difficult to iron due to the complex series of pleats. It became obsolete in 1961 and No. 2 service dress was reintroduced in its place in 1962 for barracks and parade use.

=== No. 5: Desert combat dress ===
Desert combat clothing is listed as: hat, jacket and trousers DPM and were issued to soldiers and other British military personnel posted to Cyprus, the Middle East and Afghanistan. As issued in the 1991 Gulf War, this uniform was identical to the No. 9 DPM tropical uniform, except for the multi-tone desert camouflage. This was quickly replaced with a two-tone desert version of DPM camouflage (the base colour and one other). Smocks were also available in the desert DPM, including the SAS pattern windproof smock. Covers for combat helmets and body armour were also made in this camouflage prior to their replacement by Multi-Terrain Pattern (MTP) camouflage.

Since 2011, No. 5 dress has no longer been issued due to the introduction of the Personal Clothing System – Combat Uniform (PCS-CU).

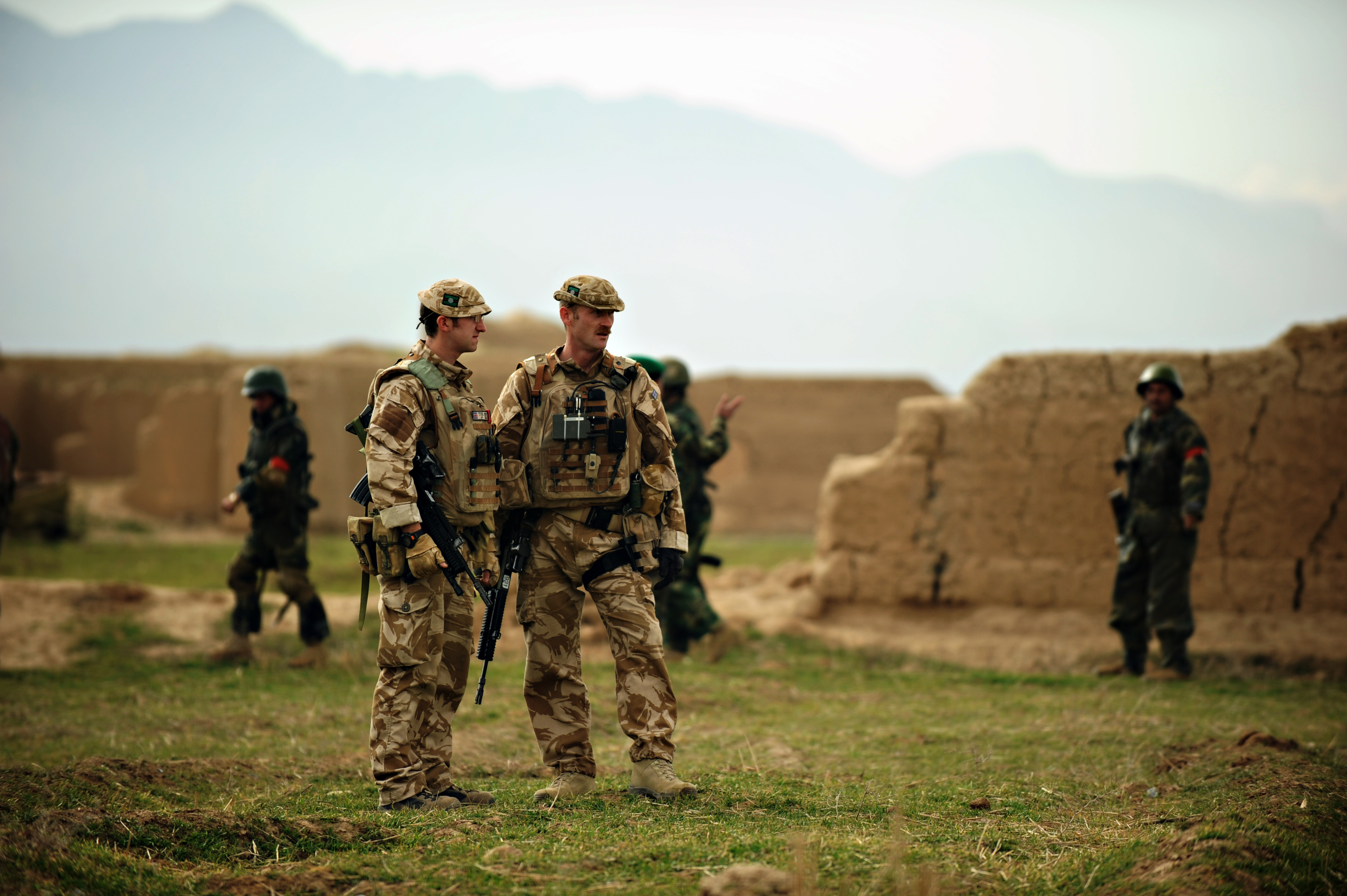
British soldiers wearing desert combat dress including body armour covers and bush hats.

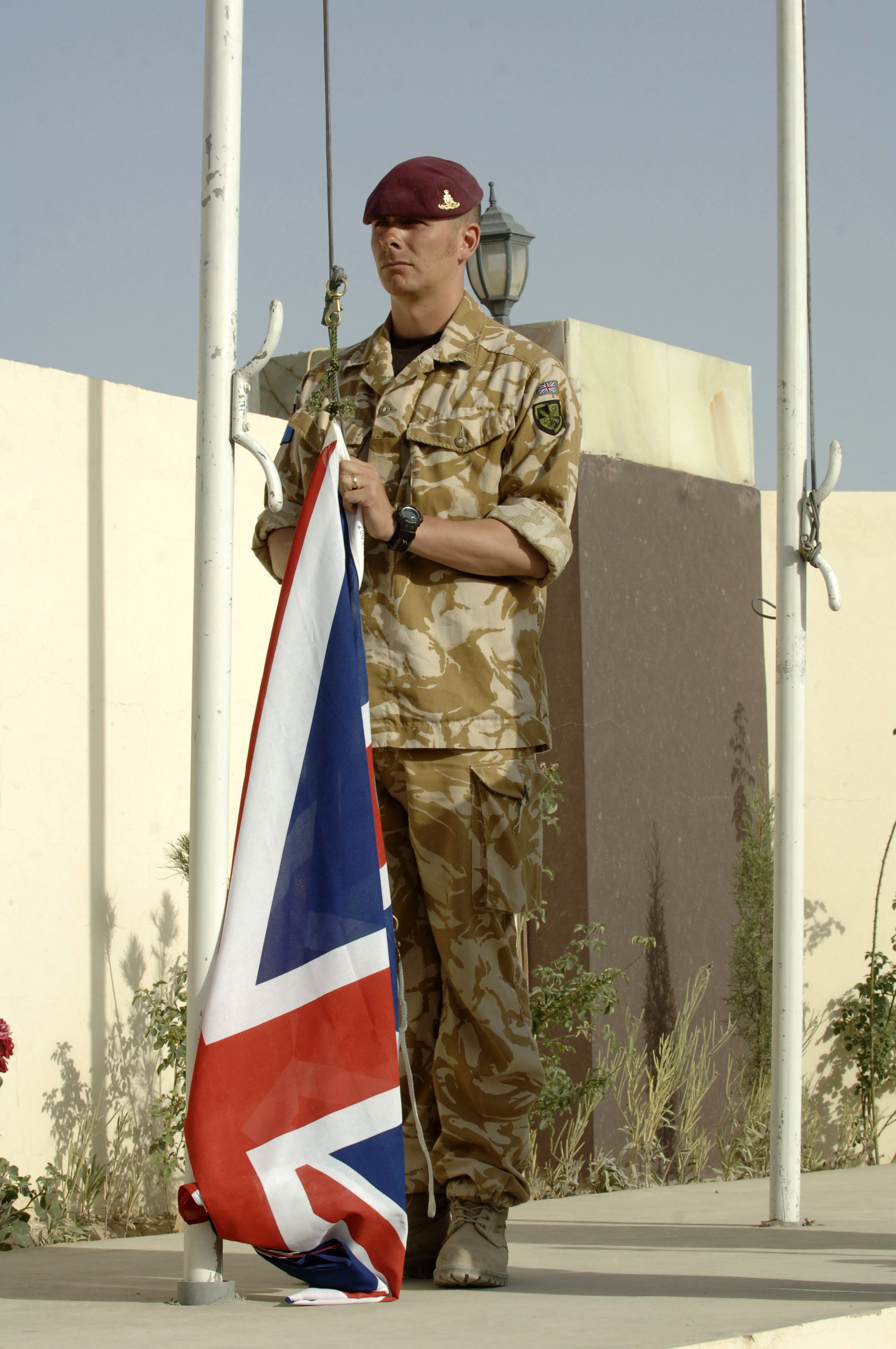
A British soldier of the Royal Artillery, with No. 5 desert combat dress shirt and trousers.

=== No. 8: Temperate combat dress ===
Prior to 2011 this was based on a woodland/temperate variant of Disruptive Pattern Material. Smocks were also available in the temperate DPM, including the SAS pattern windproof smock. Covers for combat helmets and body armour were also made in this camouflage prior to their replacement by multi-terrain pattern (MTP) camouflage.

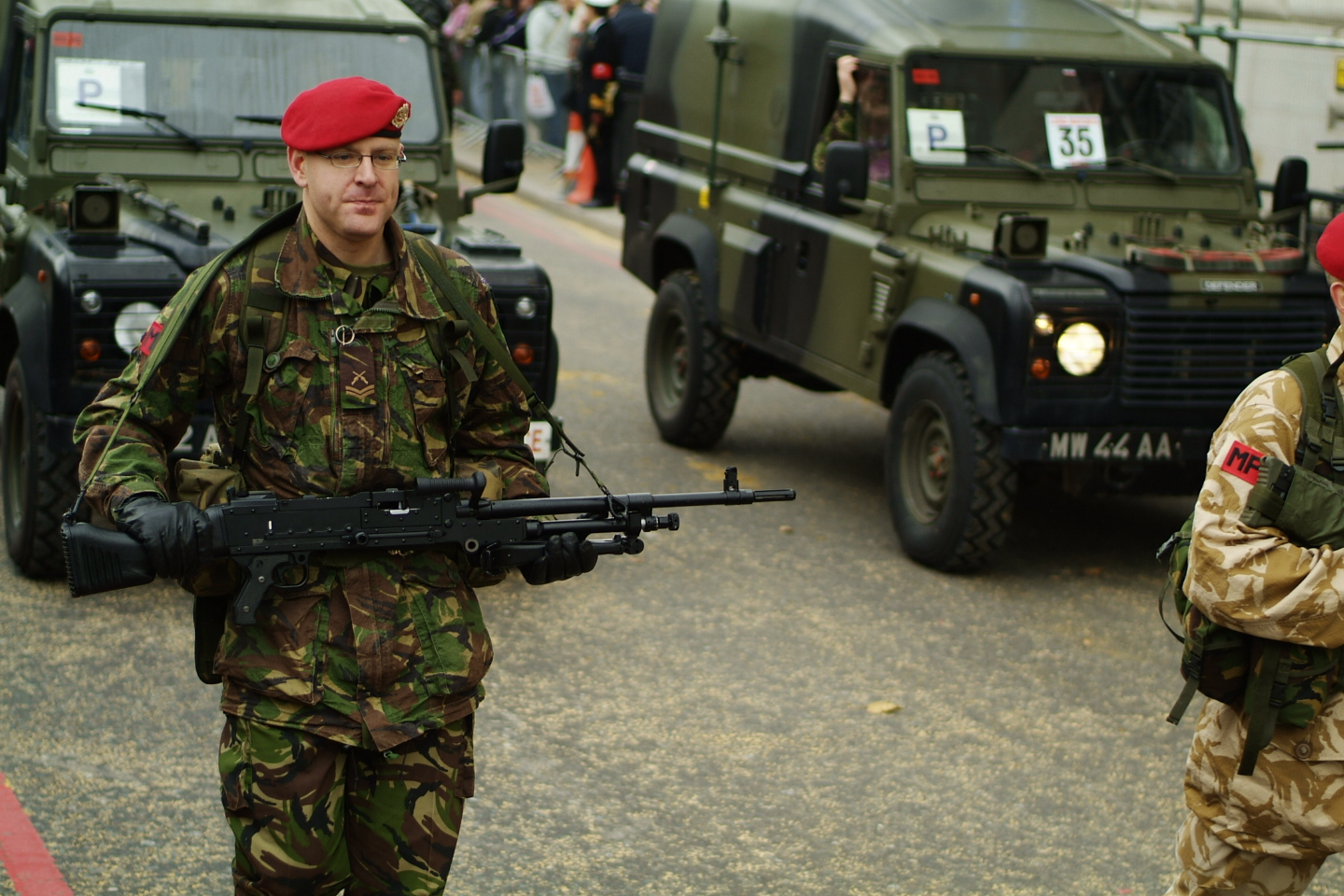
No. 8: Temperate Combat Dress jacket and trousers.

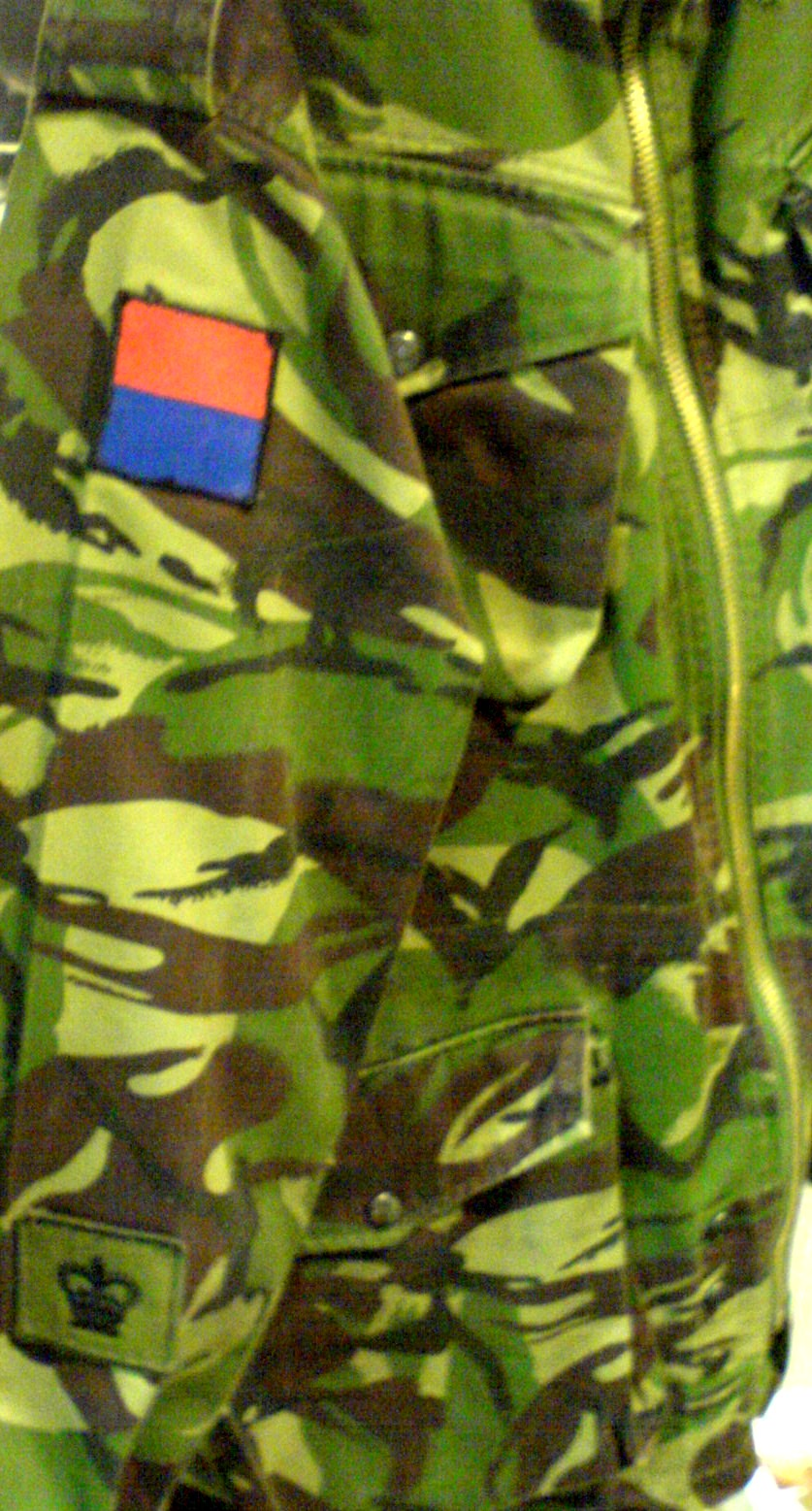
Temperate Combat Dress Para Smock with a tactical recognition flash and rank insignia.

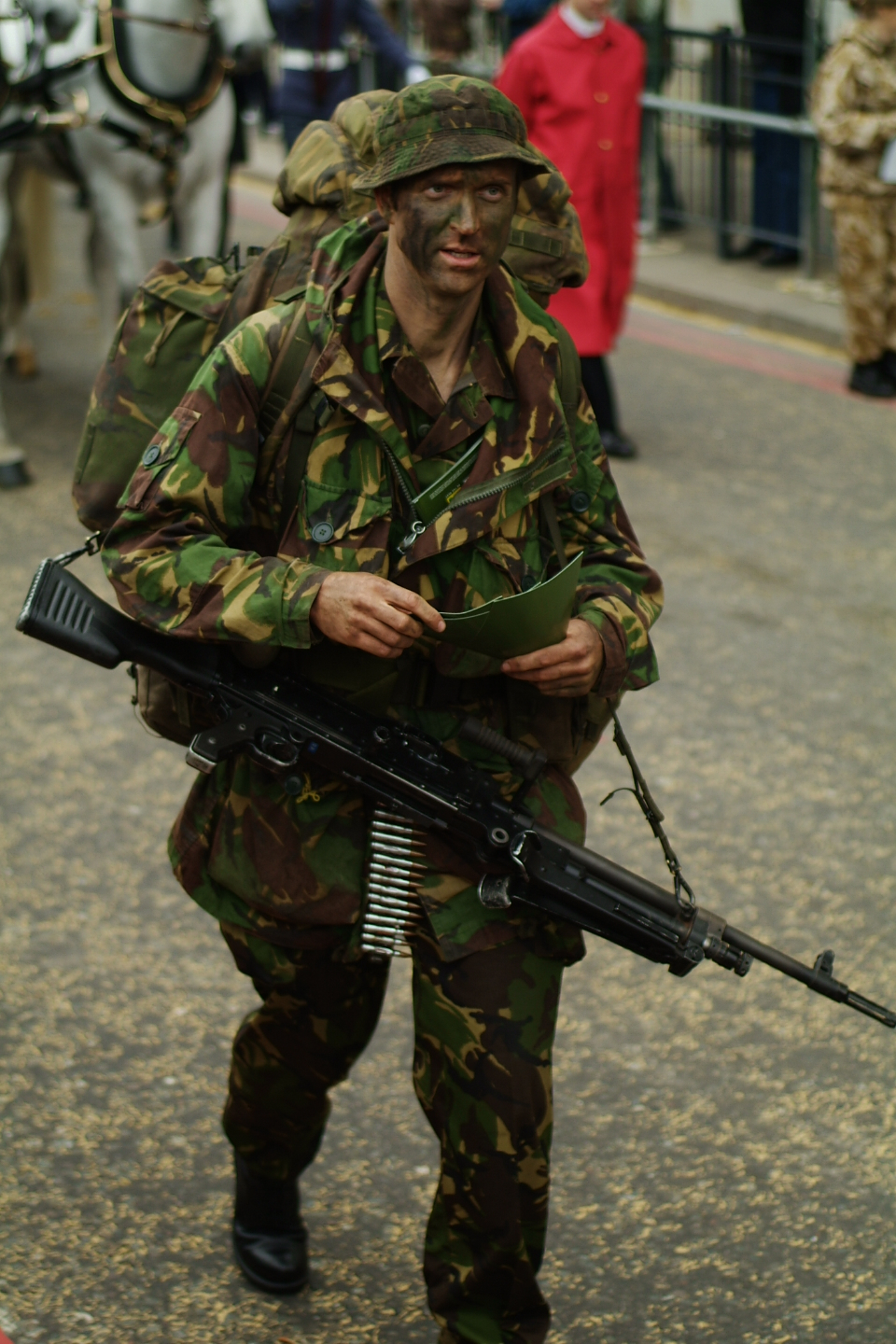
A British soldier wearing No. 8: trousers, parka and bush hat.

=== No. 9: Tropical combat dress ===
No. 9 dress is no longer provided, being replaced by PCS-CU. It was made from cotton or poly-cotton DPM of a lighter weight than pre-Combat Soldier 95 No. 8 dress. The jacket was similar in cut to a shirt and had epaulettes fitted to the shoulders. Its sleeves could be rolled above the elbow and the shirt tucked into the trousers for a smarter appearance for example in barracks. There is a large pocket on each breast, closed with a button-down flap, and a first aid field dressing pocket on one sleeve. This uniform was normally worn with a DPM bush hat; out of the field, regimental headdress was often worn. The trousers had button down belt loops when carrying equipment was not worn, a uniform belt was worn in these loops.

Sergeant of the Royal Bermuda Regiment (right) in No. 9 dress with a Jamaica Defence Force soldier.

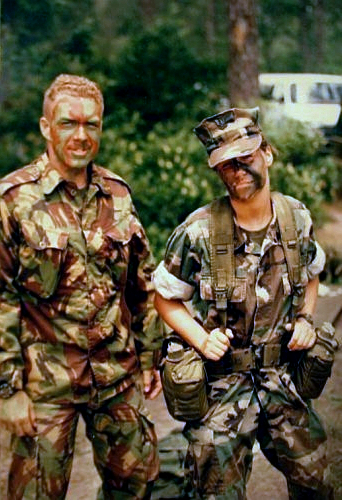
Royal Bermuda Regiment NCO in No. 9 dress with shirt worn out, and a US Navy NAS Bermuda (female) Corspman.

== History ==
=== Red coats ===
Prior to the English Civil War of 1642–1651 the only significant instances of uniform dress in British military culture occurred in small bodyguard units, notably the Yeoman of the Guard. Other than these royal bodyguards, there was no standing English Army before the English Civil War, only the permanent, but part-time, Militia for home defence and temporary forces raised for expeditions abroad. Scotland, which remained independent from England until the 1707 Acts of Union created the Kingdom of Great Britain, also raised a standing Scottish Army after the English Civil War (known in Scotland and Ireland as the Wars of the Three Kingdoms), which merged with the English Army in 1707 to create the British Army.

In 1645, during the First English Civil War, the Parliamentary New Model Army adopted a fairly standardized pattern of red clothing, a practice which continued with the small regular English Army of the Restoration period. The Scottish Army initially appears to have issued grey uniforms but began to imitate English Army practice by adopting red uniforms from the 1680s.

By the end of the 17th century, the colour of the uniforms of the English Army was largely settled on red with few exceptions. Red coats became the norm for line infantry, including foot guards, and certain other units. The practice of distinguishing regiments by different facings was in general use by the early 18th century. In the decades after the end of the Napoleonic Wars, British Army uniforms trended towards extravagance rather than practicality. That trend was reversed during the Crimean War with the adoption of looser fitting tunics and more practical headdresses. At the time, the Royal Artillery, Royal Engineers, Royal Sappers and Miners, and the Commissariat Department and transport organs were not part of the British Army but of the Board of Ordnance. After the Crimean War, the Board of Ordnance was abolished and these units (with the Royal Sappers and Miners having been amalgamated into the Royal Engineers) and the Commissariat, stores and transport organs (re-organized ultimately into the Army Ordnance Corps and the Army Service Corps, both since amalgamated into today's Royal Logistic Corps), were transferred to the British Army. The Royal Artillery wore dark blue tunics. Red tunics were however retained by the Royal Engineers (the pre-Crimean War, officer-only Royal Engineers and the Corps of Royal Sappers and Miners, made up of other-ranks, originally wore blue jackets, but first wore red during the Napoleonic Wars), line infantry and most other units, including cavalry, except in India where drab coloured garments were introduced in 1848 and worn increasingly from 1857 on.

Until 1873 the other ranks of most infantry regiments wore tunics in madder red. In that year the brighter shade of scarlet was adopted, having previously been limited to officers, sergeants and all ranks of certain regiments of cavalry.

General issue of full dress uniforms ceased at the start of the First World War. The Household Division resumed wearing their scarlet and blue full dress in 1920, but for the remainder of the Army it was only worn by regimental bands, or else on certain limited social or ceremonial occasions (an example of the latter was the 1937 Coronation when mounted detachments from participating cavalry regiments were issued with full dress uniforms for the occasion). The reason for not generally reintroducing the distinctive full dress between the wars was primarily financial, as the scarlet cloth required expensive red cochineal dye.

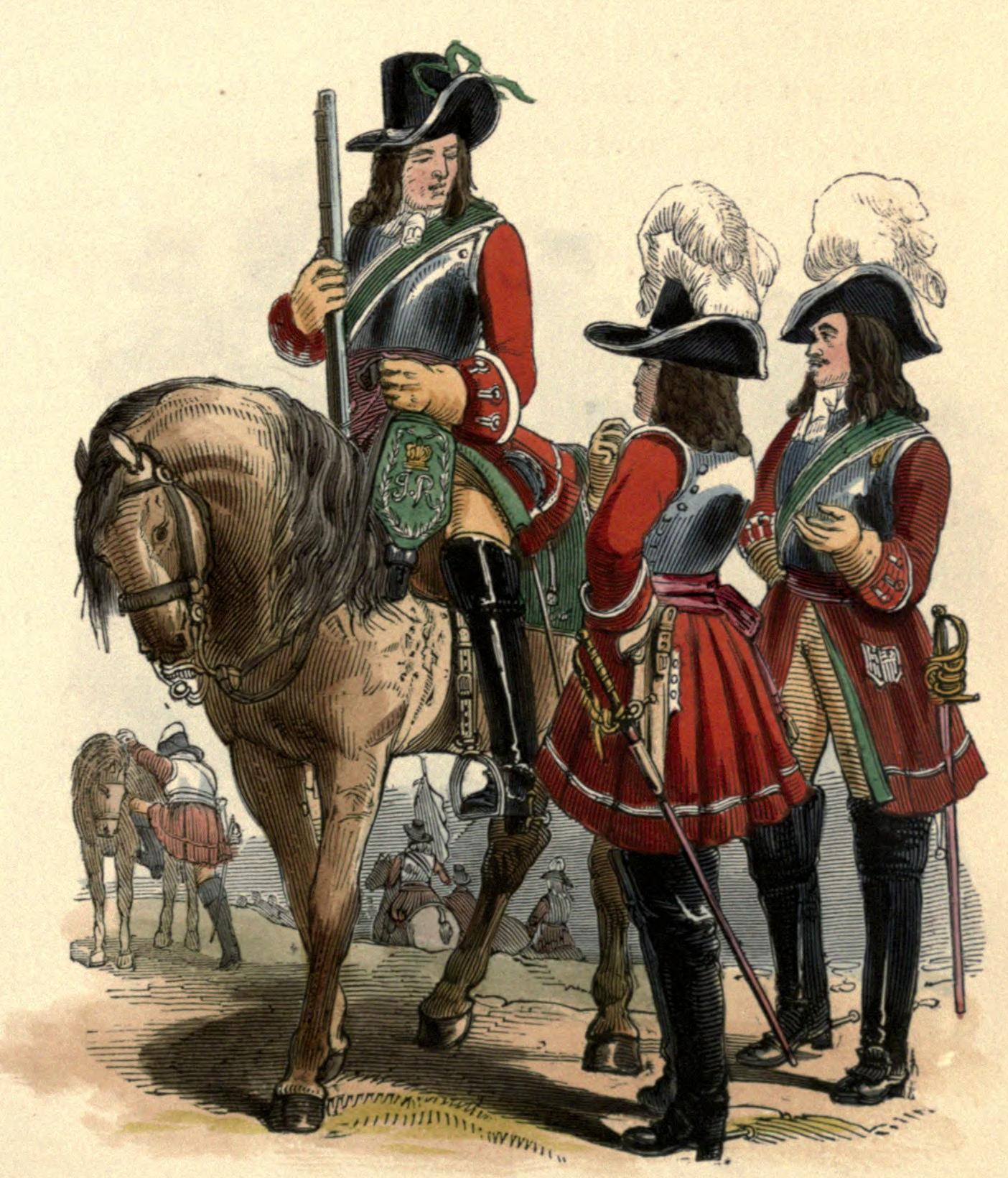
4th Regiment of Horse in 1687

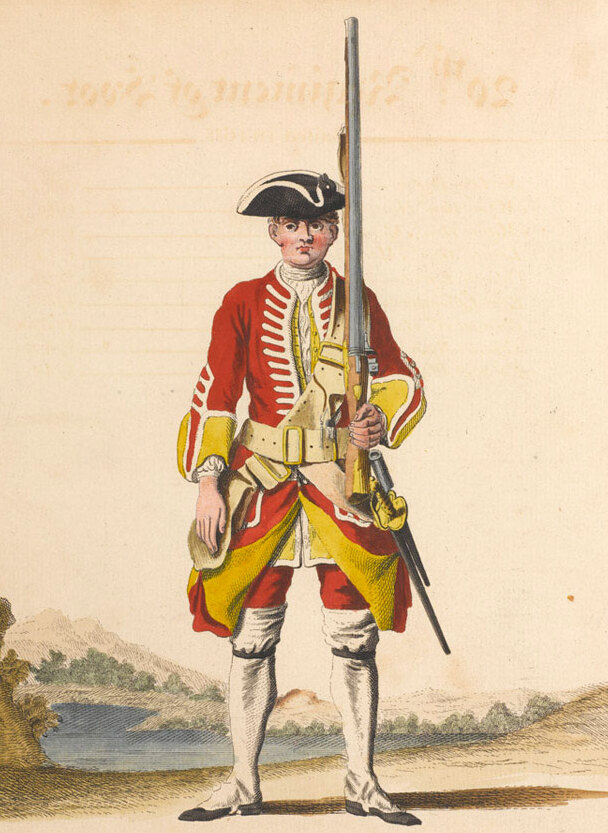
Private of the 20th Regiment of Foot from the Cloathing Book of 1742. (The tricorne was an evolution of the wide-brimmed hat formerly worn.)

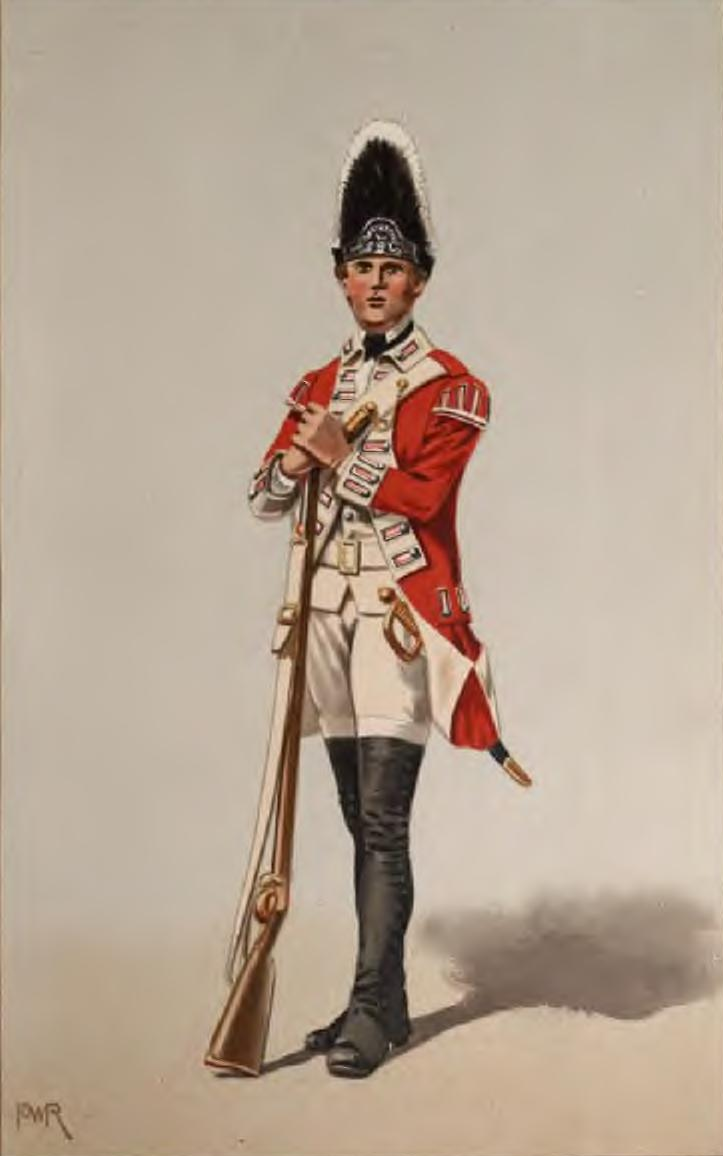
Grenadier of the 40th Regiment of Foot in 1767. (The distinctive mitre-shaped cap worn in grenadier companies allowed grenades to be thrown overarm.)

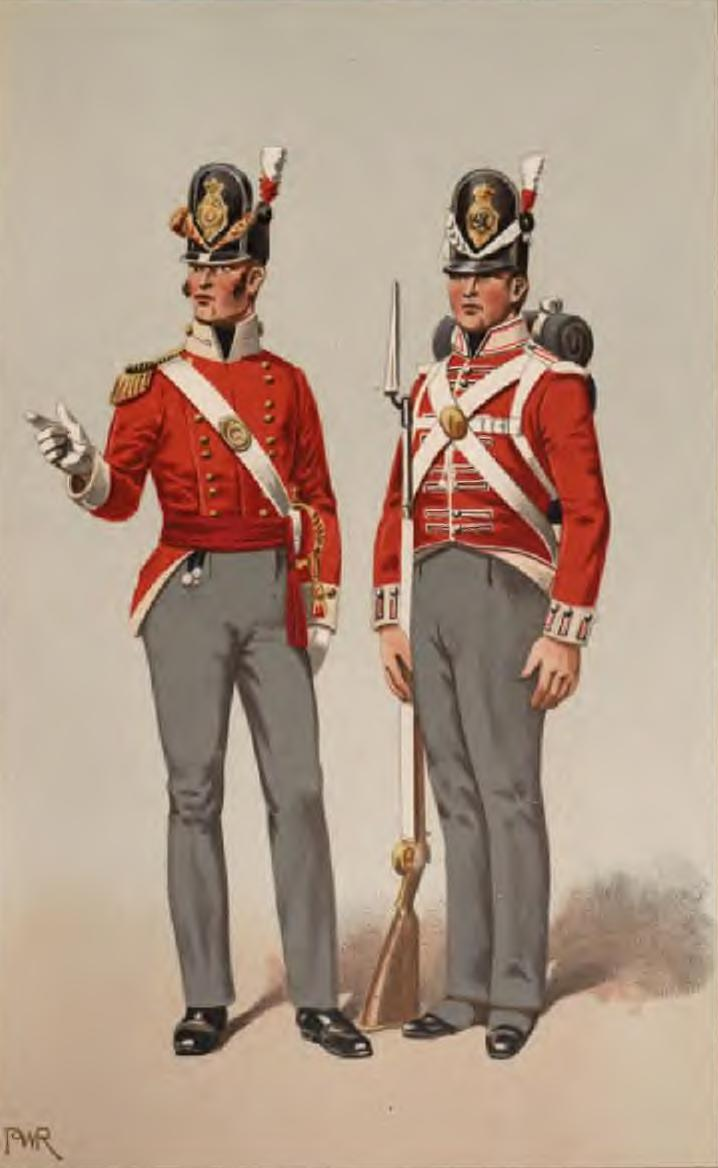
Officer and private of the 40th Regiment of Foot in 1815. (The shako was adopted as standard headwear by most line infantry regiments around 1800.)

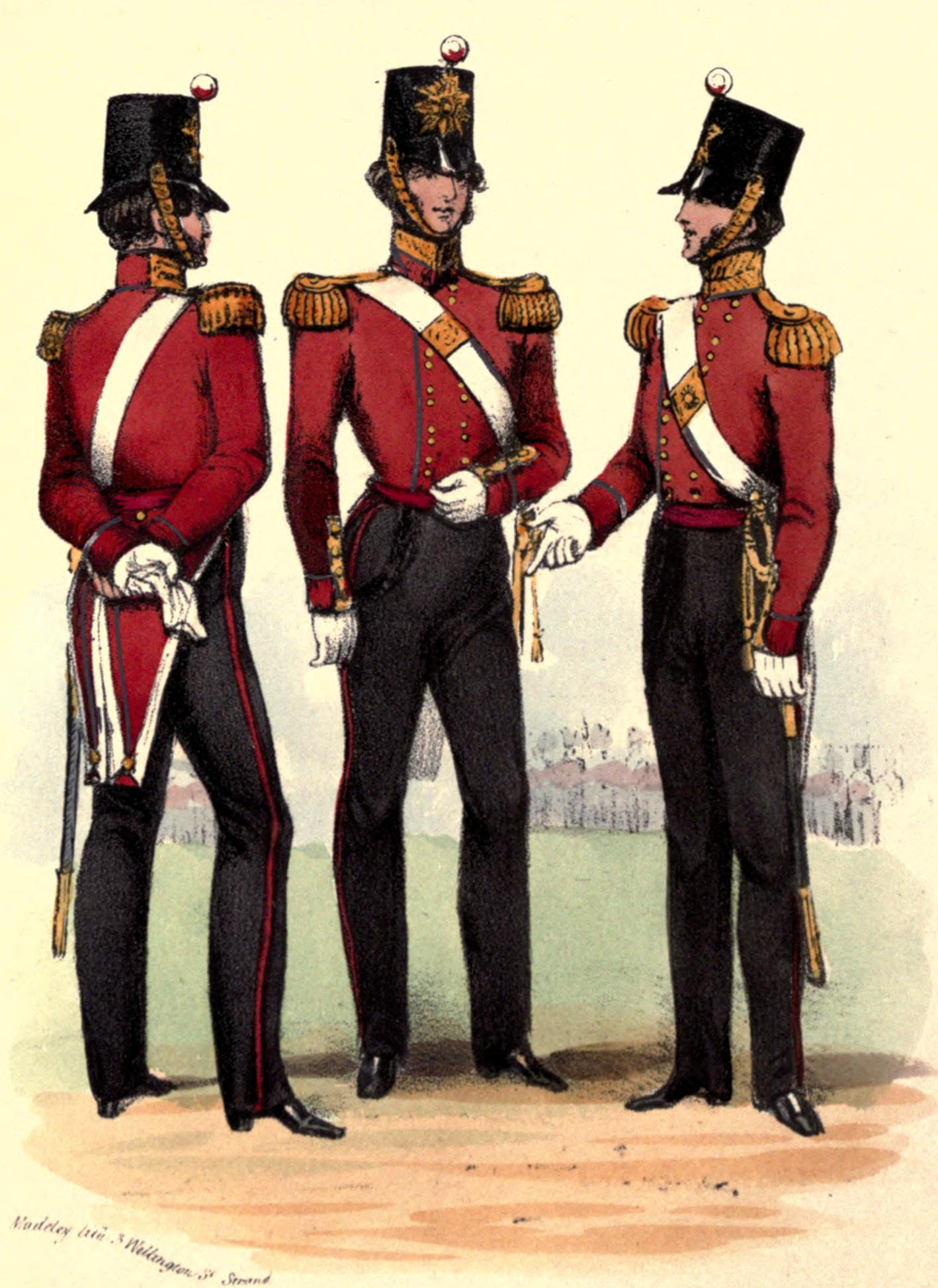
Soldiers of the 53rd Regiment of Foot in 1849. (The tailed coatee, worn here, was replaced in 1855 by the skirted tunic.)

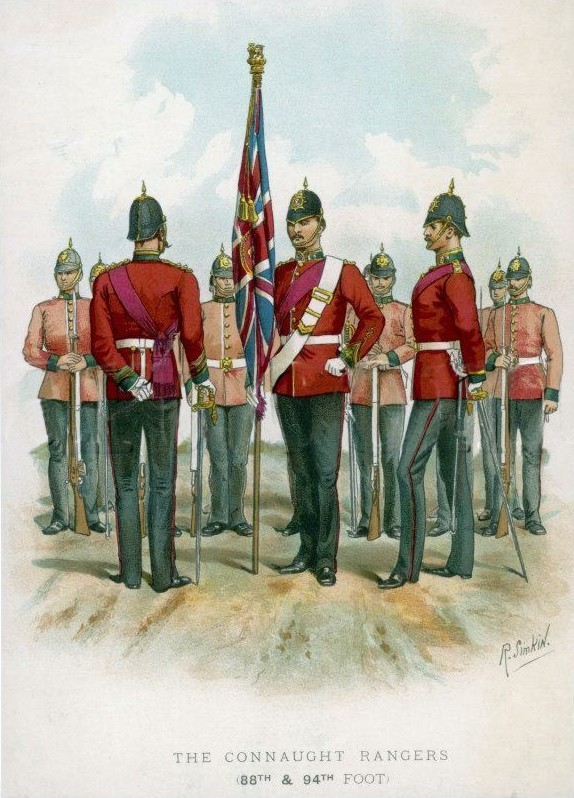
Soldiers of the Connaught Rangers after 1881. (In most infantry units the home service helmet replaced the shako in 1878.)

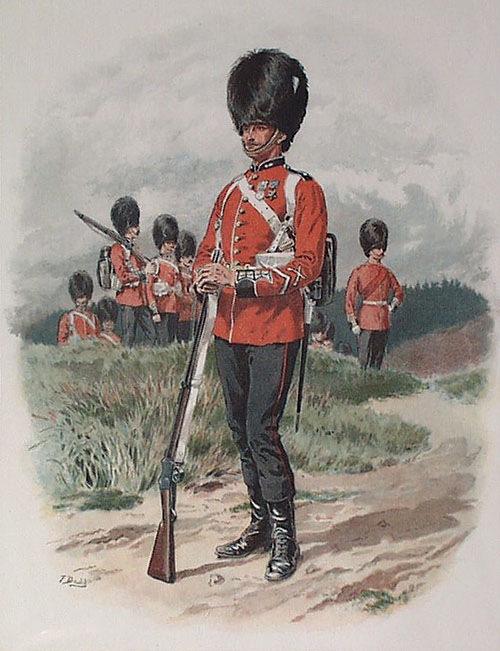
Grenadier Guards, 1889. (By 1815 the mitre cap, worn by both grenadiers and fusiliers, had evolved into the bearskin cap.)

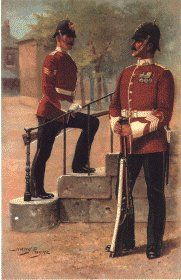
The Manchester Regiment in the last generally worn full dress uniform of 1914.

Not all full dress uniforms were or are scarlet. Historically, the great bulk of the British Army wore red or scarlet, with the Royal Artillery distinctive in blue. In the early nineteenth century, the success of élite Hungarian Hussars and Polish Lancers inspired the creation of similar units in other European armies, which also adopted their highly-distinctive forms of dress. In the British Army, these light cavalry uniforms were mostly dark blue.

At the same time, the formation of regiments of Riflemen, who had always worn dark green rather than red, for reasons of camouflage, led to the full-dress use of "Rifle green" uniforms in Rifle regiments. Line Infantry regiments invariably wore scarlet, as did heavy cavalry, with the exception of the Royal Horse Guards ('The Blues') and the 6th Dragoon Guards.

=== Khaki ===
In January 1902, the British army adopted a universal khaki uniform for home service wear, the Service Dress, after experience with lighter khaki drill in India and South Africa. The traditional scarlet, blue and green uniforms were retained for full dress and off duty "walking out dress" wear. Details of these colourful uniforms varied greatly between regiments and branches of the army. The early use of camouflage in the form of plain khaki reflected the exigencies of colonial war and the freedom allowed, and taken, by many of the officers who fought it. The adoption of khaki for active service resulted from the development of weapons of greater accuracy and range combined with smokeless powder during the late 19th century, making low visibility on the battlefield a matter of priority.

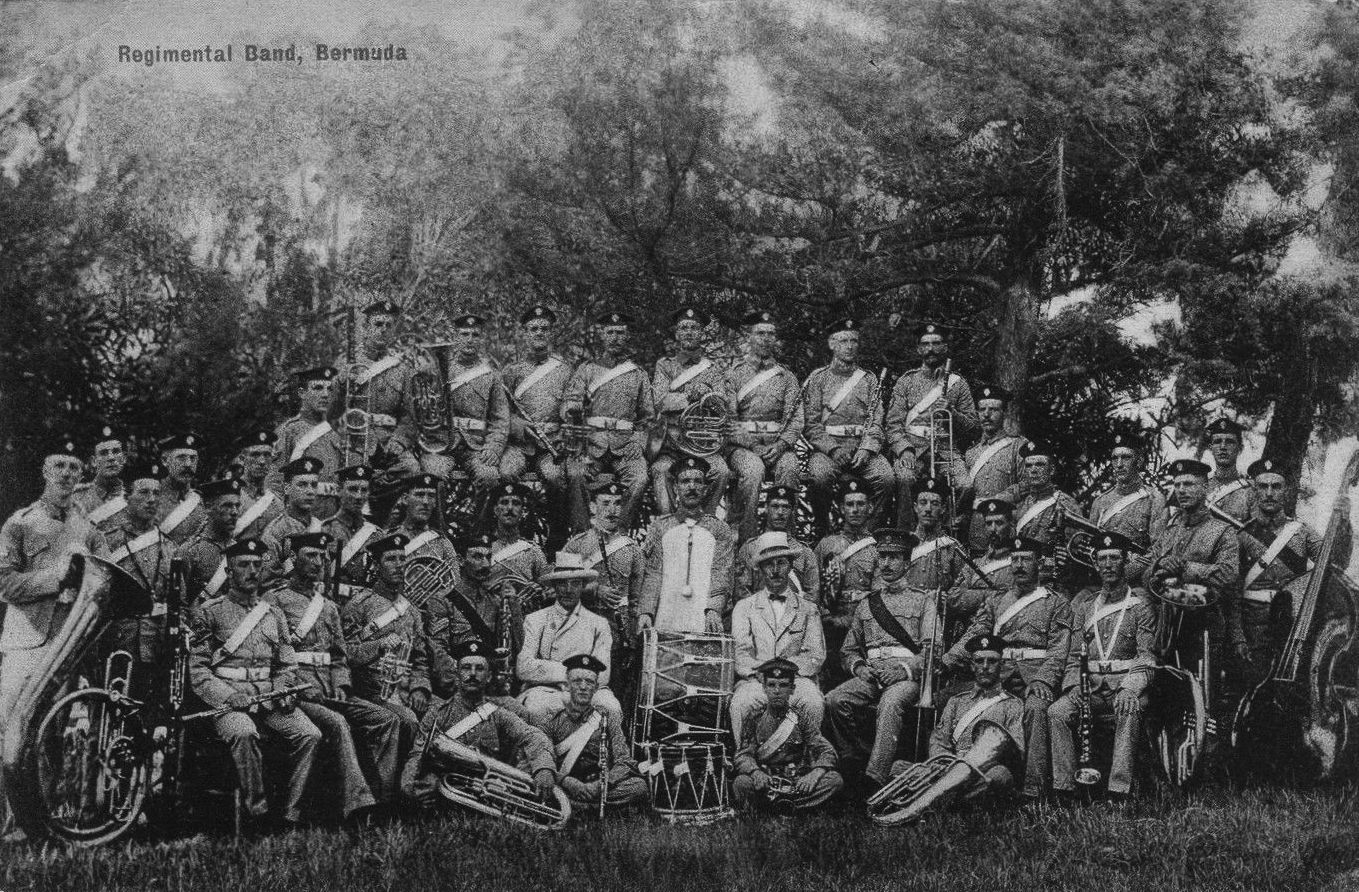
Band of the 3rd Battalion of The Royal Fusiliers in Bermuda, 1903, in lightweight khaki uniforms with Brodrick caps

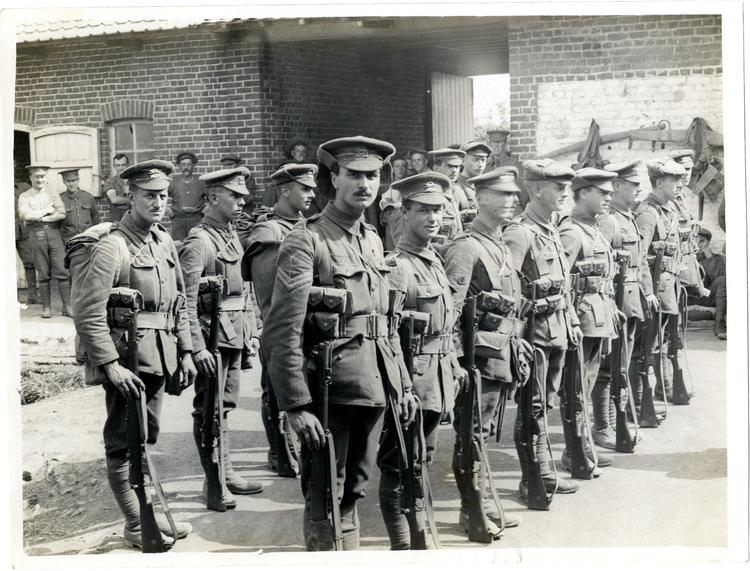
Soldiers of the Leicestershire Regiment in France in 1915, in khaki Service Dress with 1908 Pattern carrying equipment.

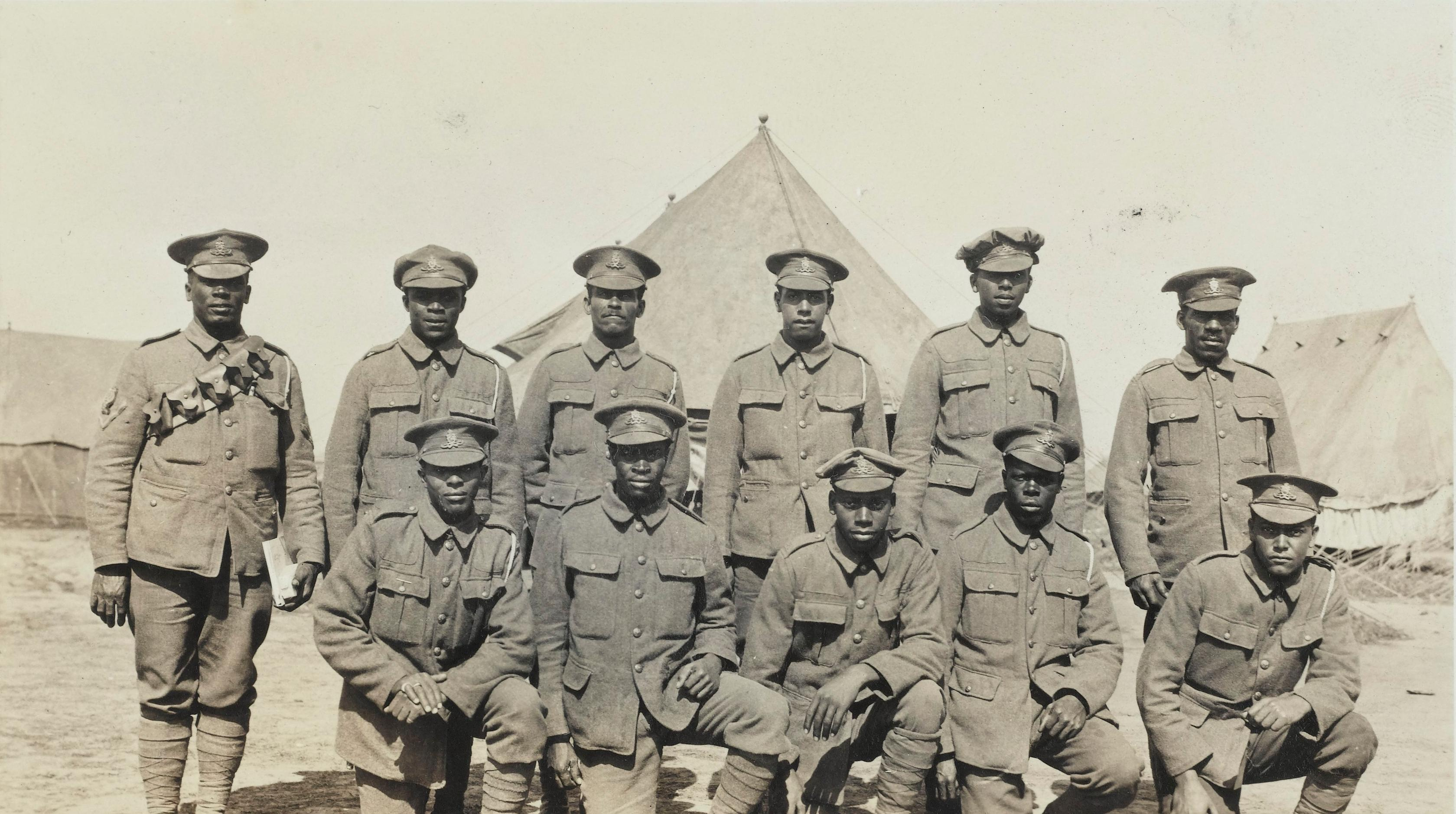
Bermuda Contingent of the Royal Garrison Artillery soldiers in a Casualty Clearing Station, July 1916, wear Service Dress with small arms ammunition bandoliers, for rifles used for defensive purposes.

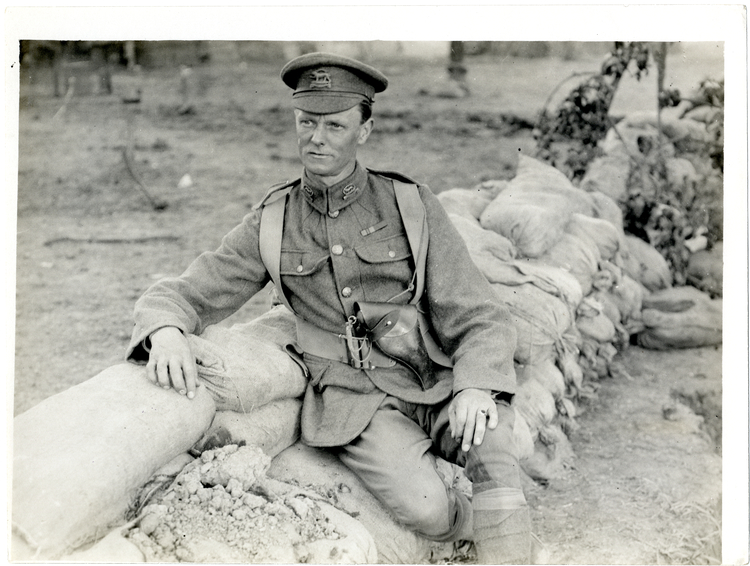
A Sergeant Major of the Leicesters in Service Dress, 1915

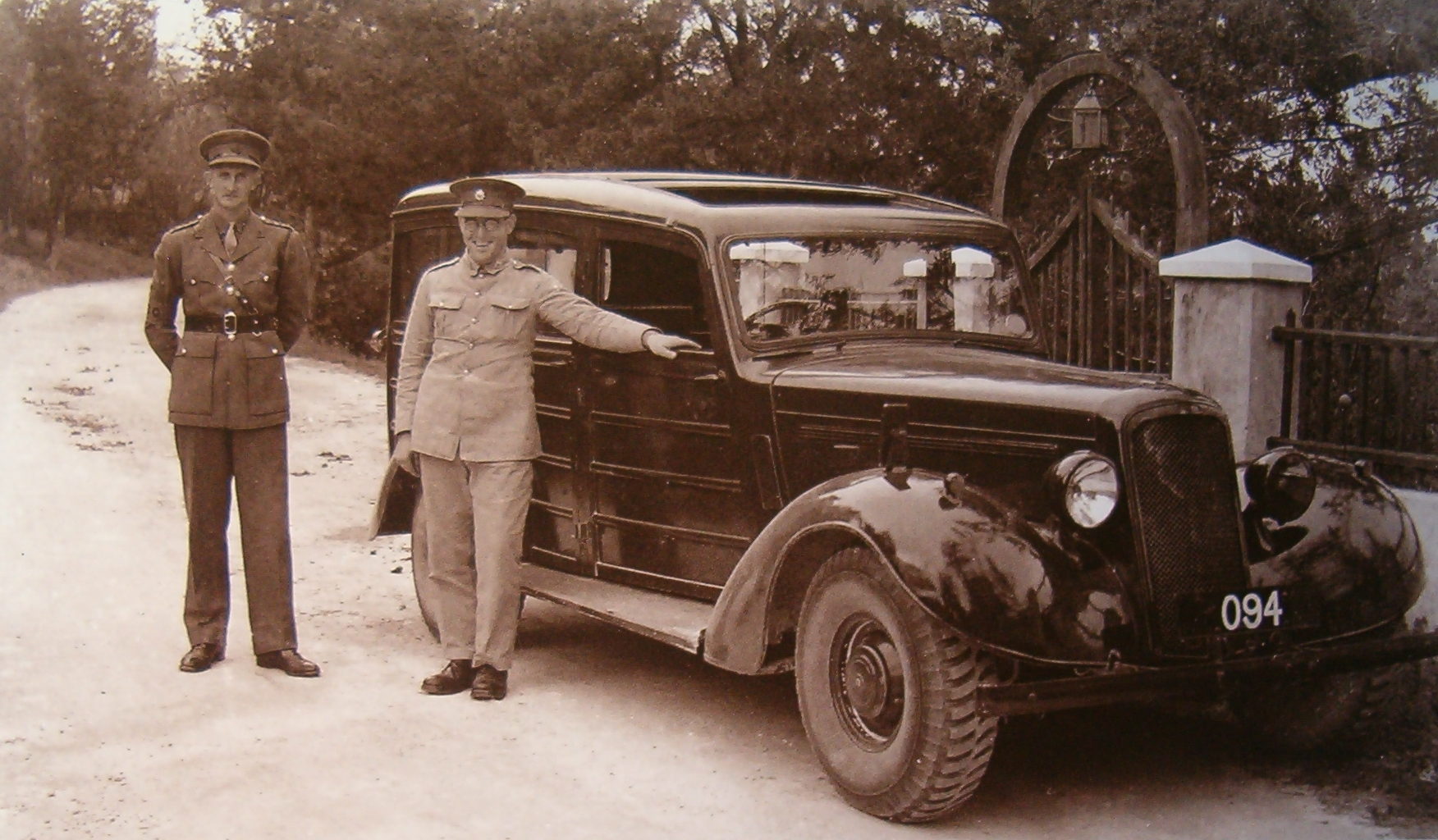
An officer in officer's temperate Service Dress and a soldier in warm weather Service Dress in Bermuda, in 1942.

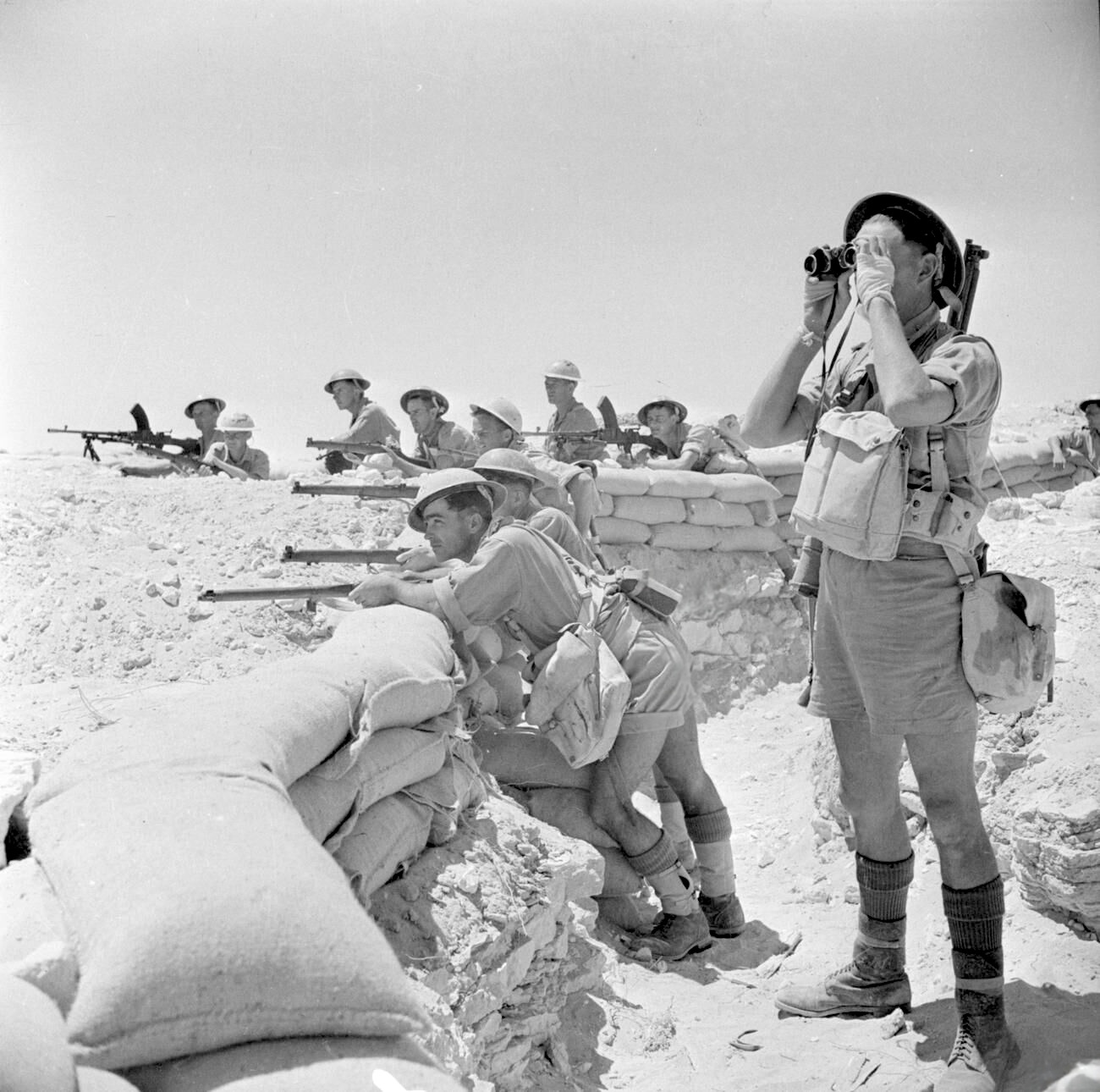
British soldiers in khaki drill uniforms, including shorts, in the Western Desert in 1942.

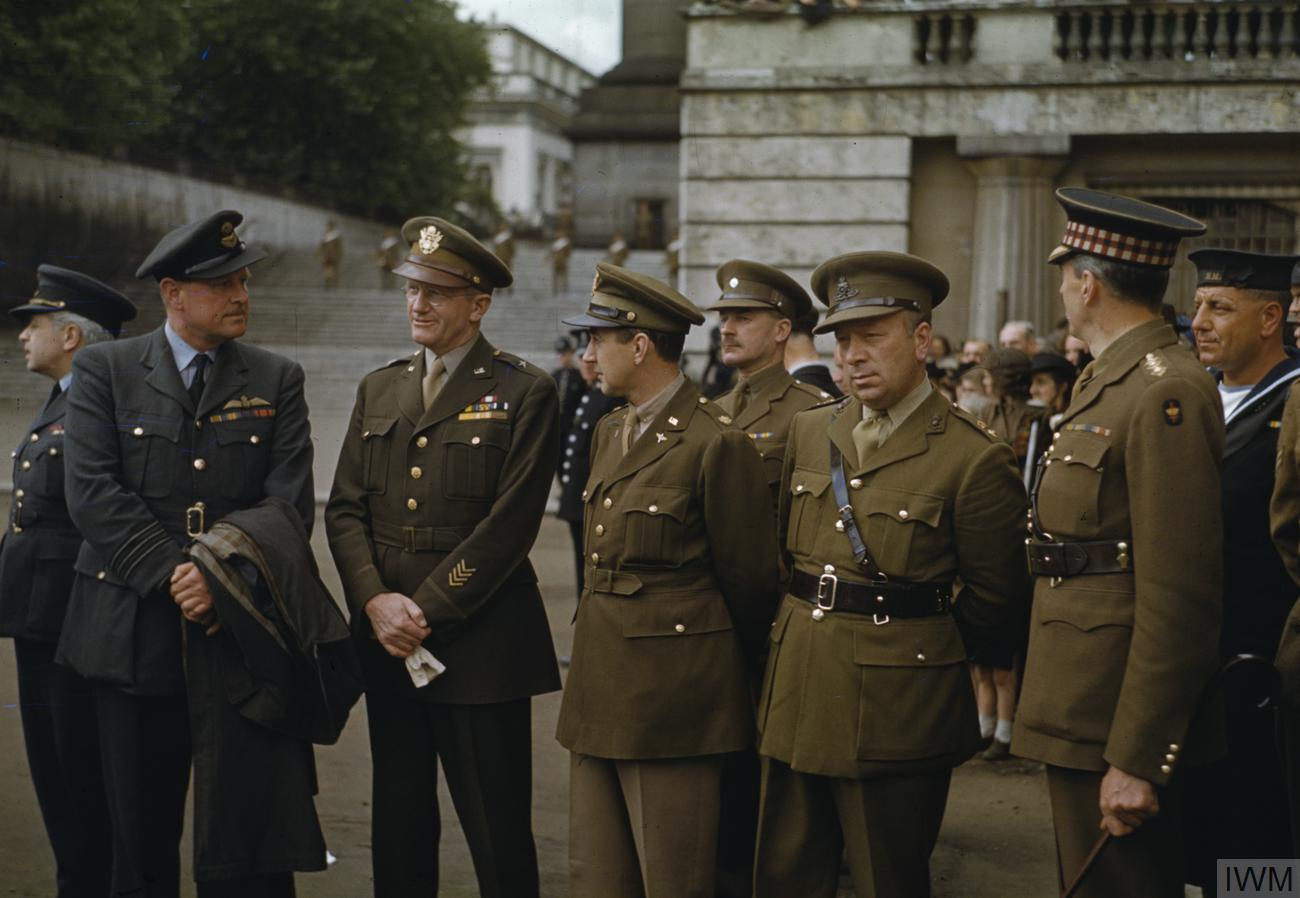
Royal Air Force (left), U.S. Army and British Army officers wearing service dress, London, 1943.

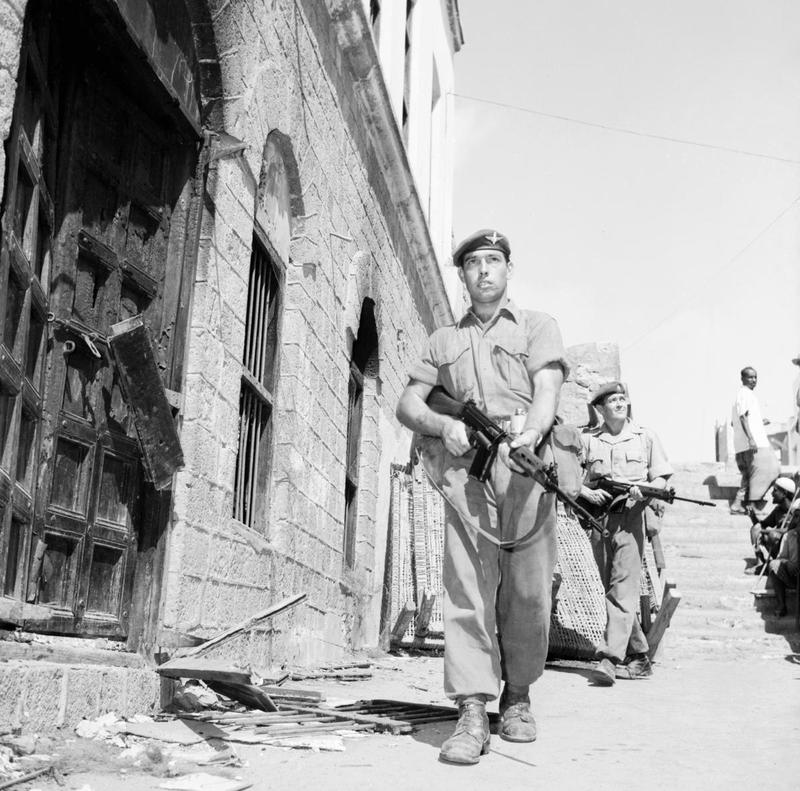
Parachute Regiment soldiers in Aden in 1956 wearing khaki drills and berets, with carrying equipment stripped to ammunition pouches.

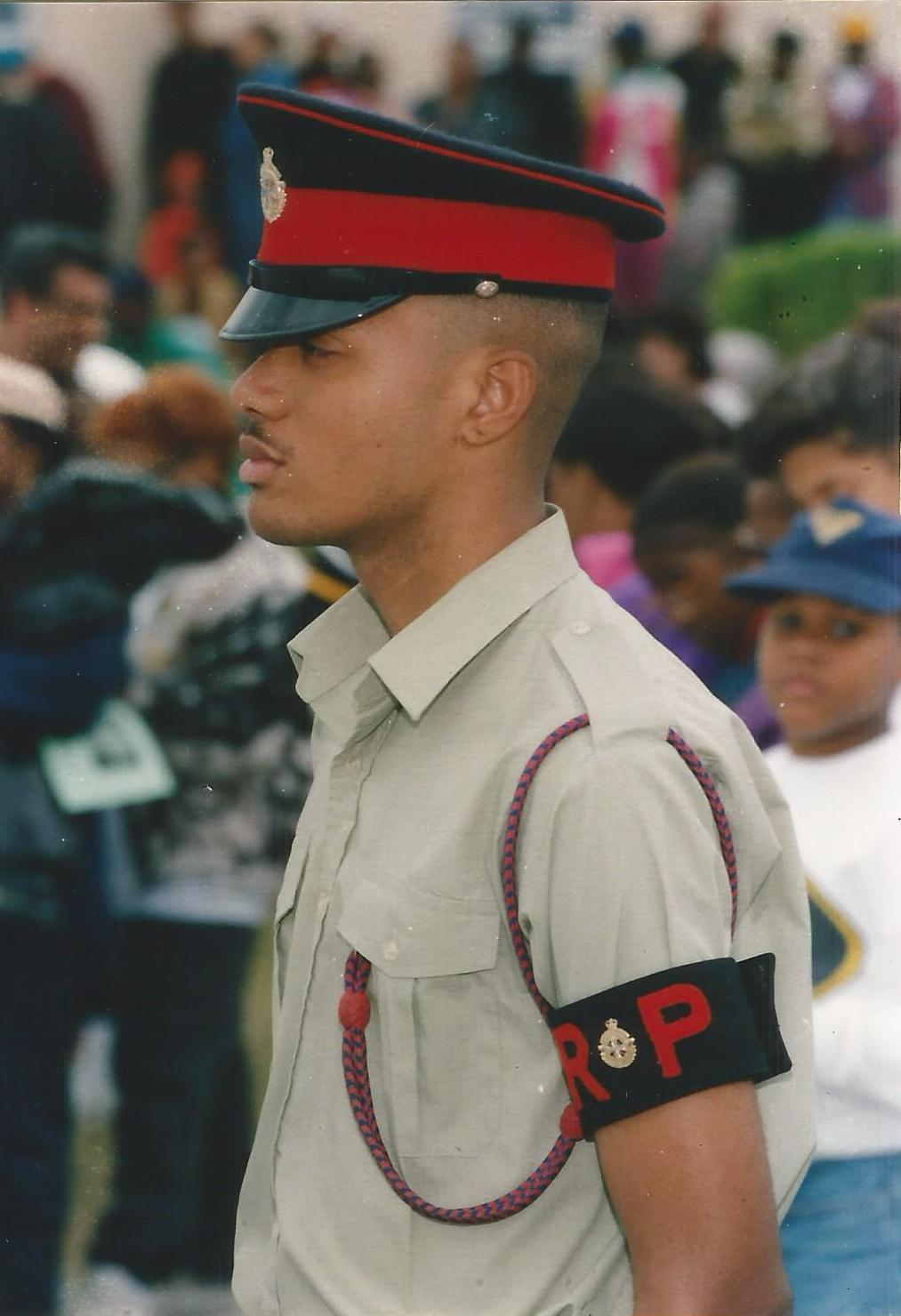
A Royal Bermuda Regiment Regimental policeman in No. 2 Dress khaki shirt, without tie, and No. 1 Dress cap.

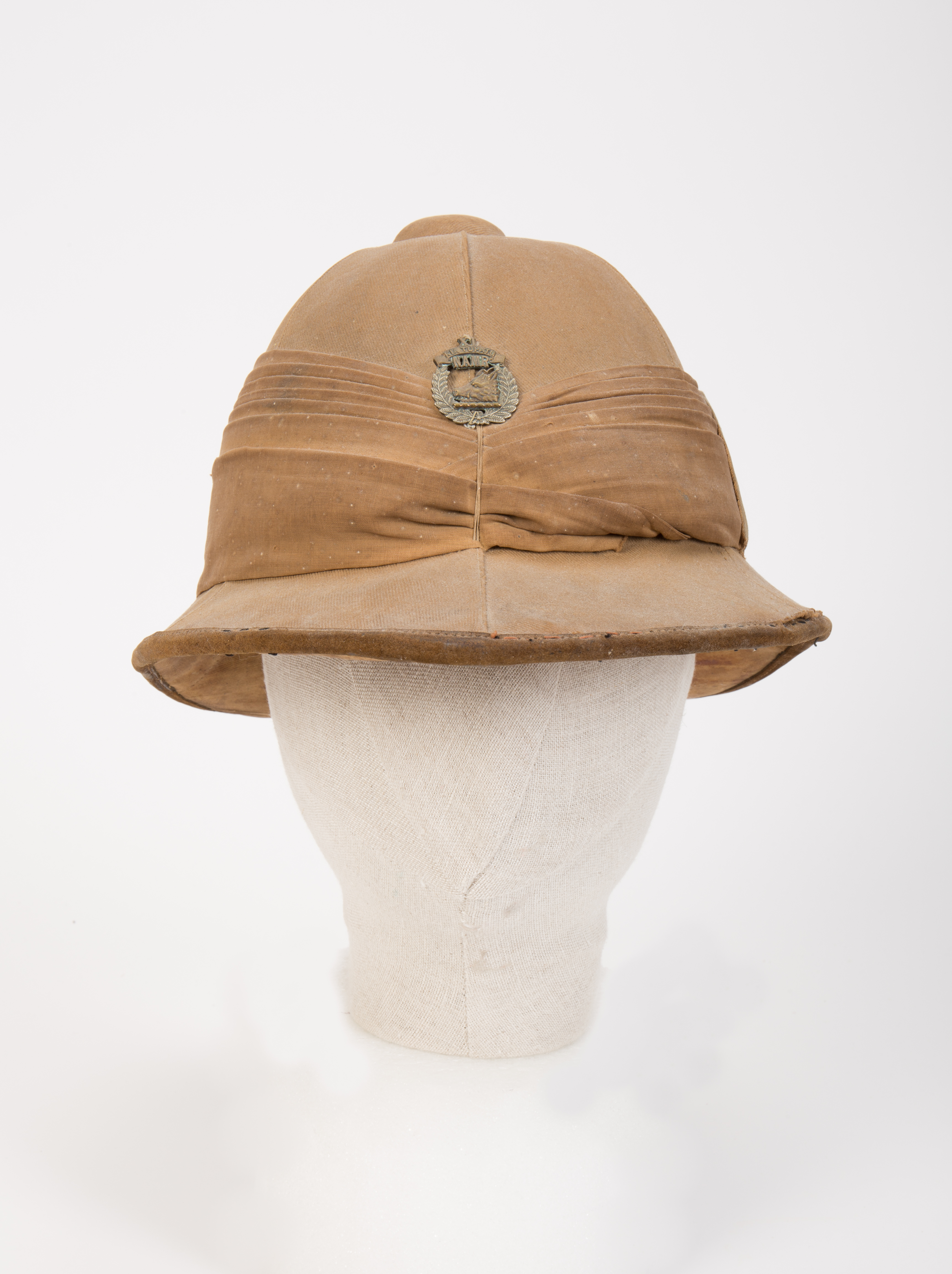
The pith helmet was commonly worn in the British army until the Second World War.

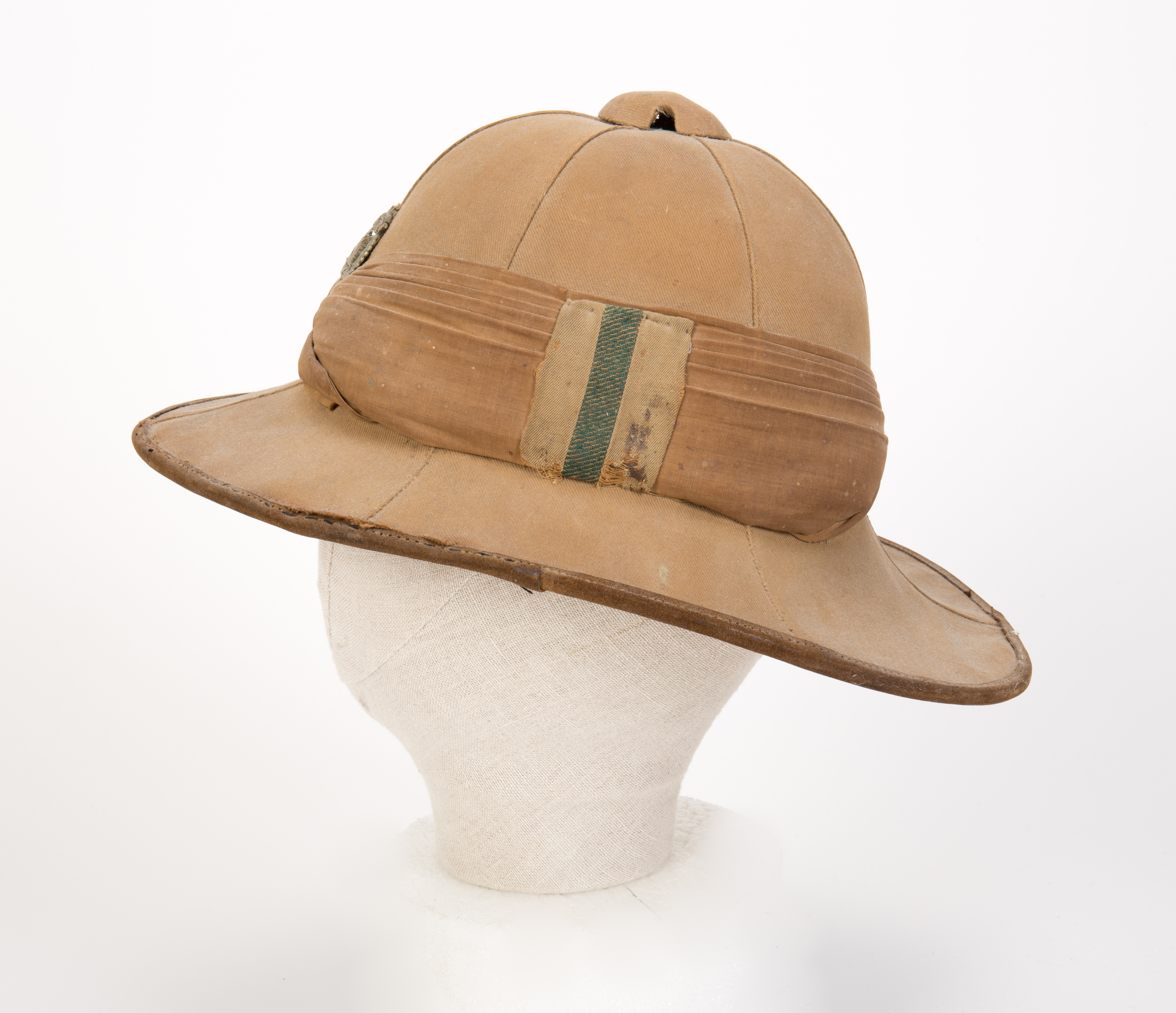
A side view of a pith helmet, showing the regimental coloured flash. The same flashes were used on slouch hats worn by the British during world war two, but smaller.

=== Battledress and camouflage ===
In 1938, the British Army adopted a revolutionary and practical type of uniform for combat known as Battledress. It was widely copied and adapted by armies around the world. During the Second World War a handful of British units adopted camouflage-patterned clothes, for example the airborne forces' Denison smock and the windproof suit. In the late 1960s, the Disruptive Pattern Material (DPM) camouflage uniform was adopted across the whole of the British Army. It remained in service, with periodical updates, for the next 40 years.

From 2009 it began to be replaced by a new Multi-Terrain Pattern (MTP) uniform. This "Personal Clothing System (Combat Uniform)" has been developed for use across the British Armed Services, making use of the latest in clothing technology. Unlike the different versions of DPM issued for use in different terrains, the new MTP kit is issued in just one version, designed to function effectively across a variety of terrains, meeting a need identified in recent combat experience.

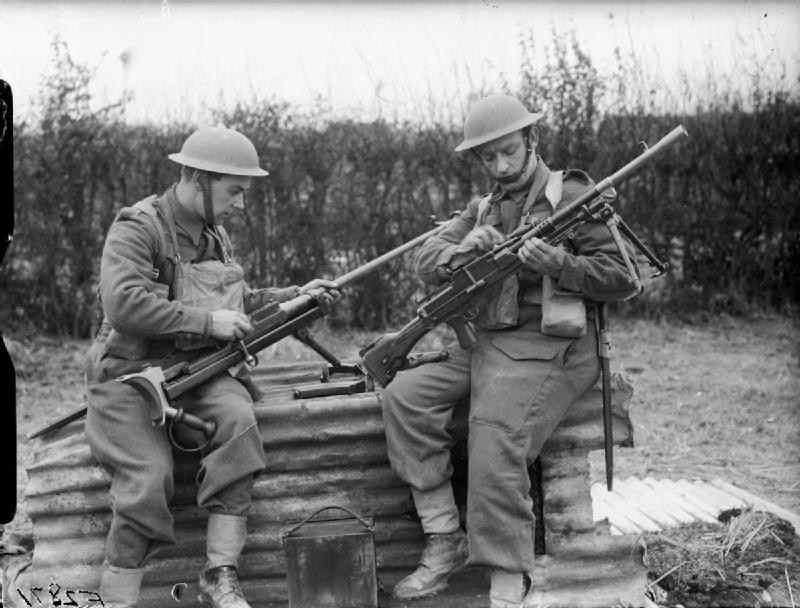
Soldiers of the Border Regiment wearing Battledress in 1940

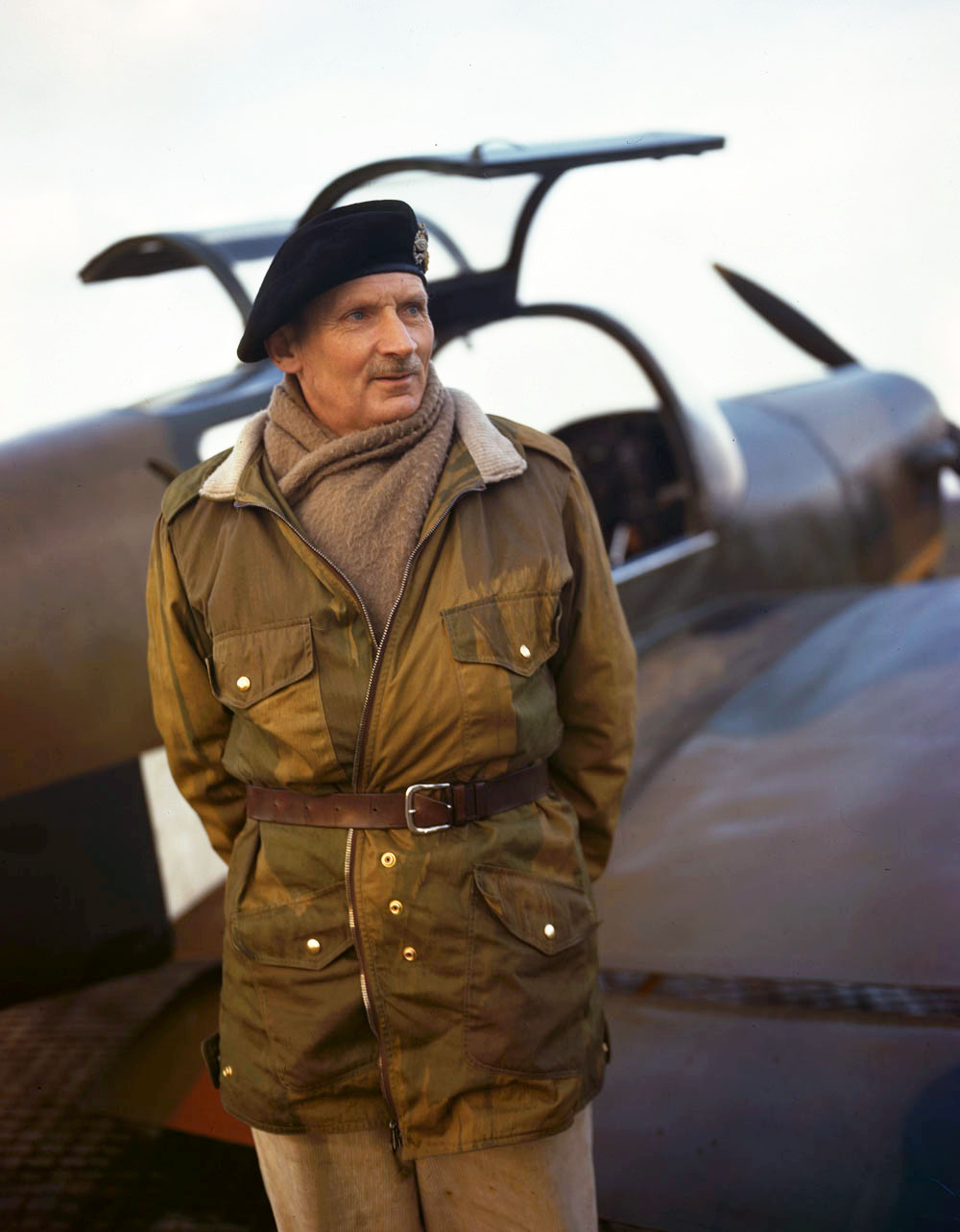
Field Marshal Bernard Montgomery wearing a Denison smock of the type issued to airborne soldiers for wear over the Battle Dress uniform. This smock evolved through several versions before being replaced by the Smock Parachutist DPM in the 1970s.

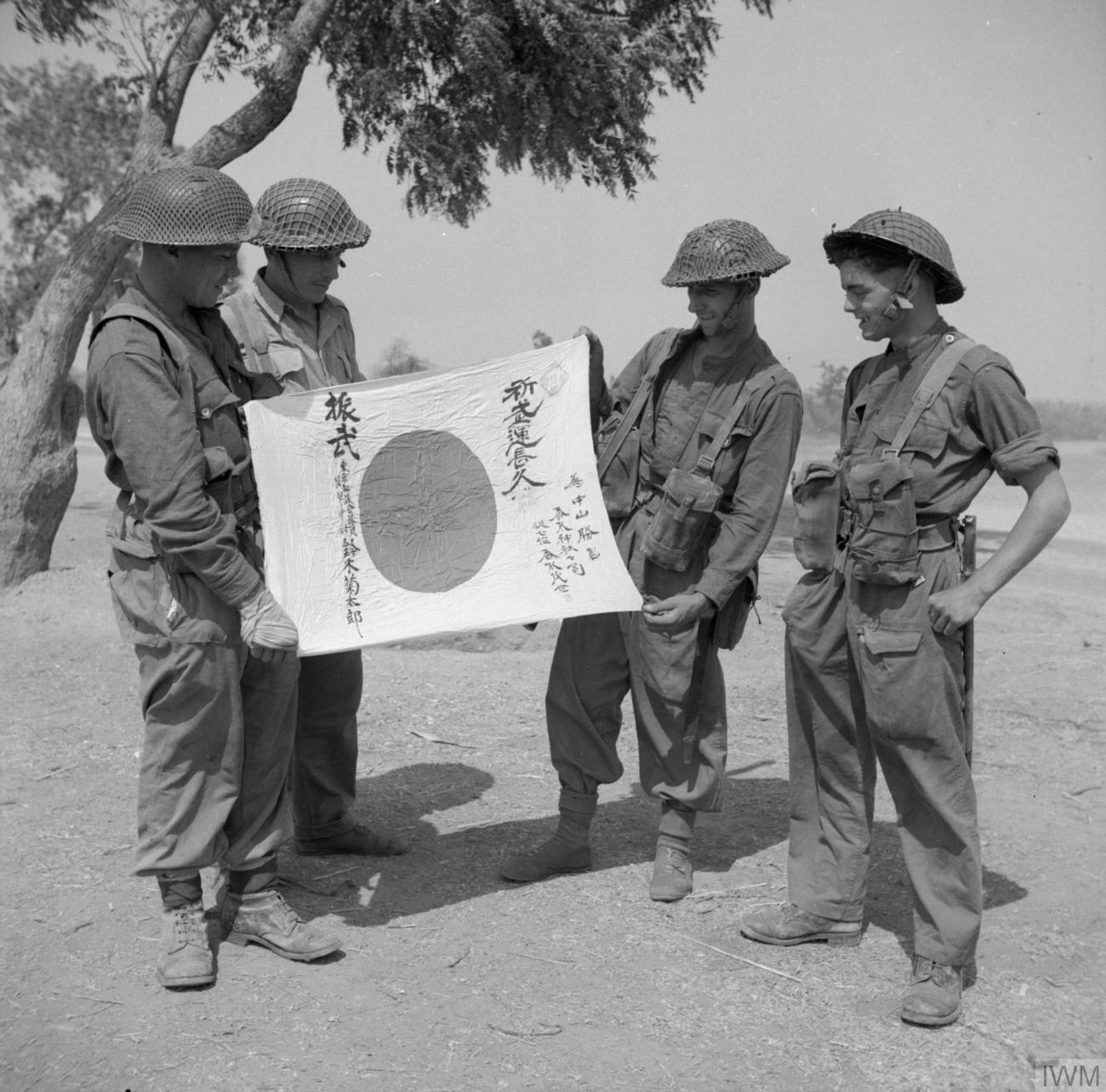
The British Army in Burma 1945. The tropical uniform consisted of green cotton shirt and trousers (trousers cut to the same pattern as the temperate serge Battle Dress trousers), ankle boots worn with puttees or anklets, bush hats (helmets are worn here, but were of little use in jungle conditions), and 1937 Pattern carrying equipment. Green 1944 Pattern carrying equipment was the norm in jungle terrain until the introduction of the 1958 Patter). This uniform was worn through the Malaysian Emergency

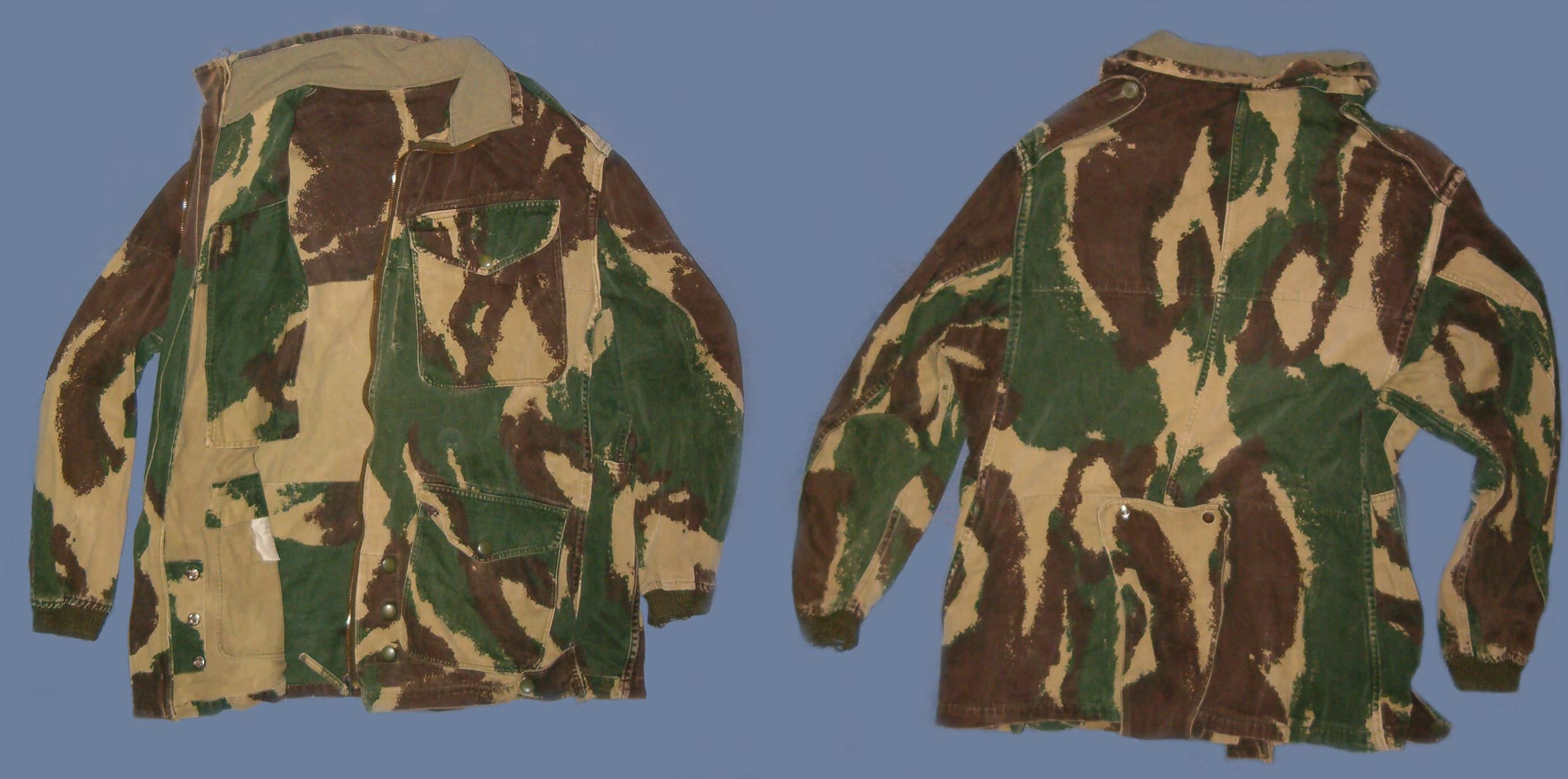
The 1959 Pattern Denison Smock for parachutists.

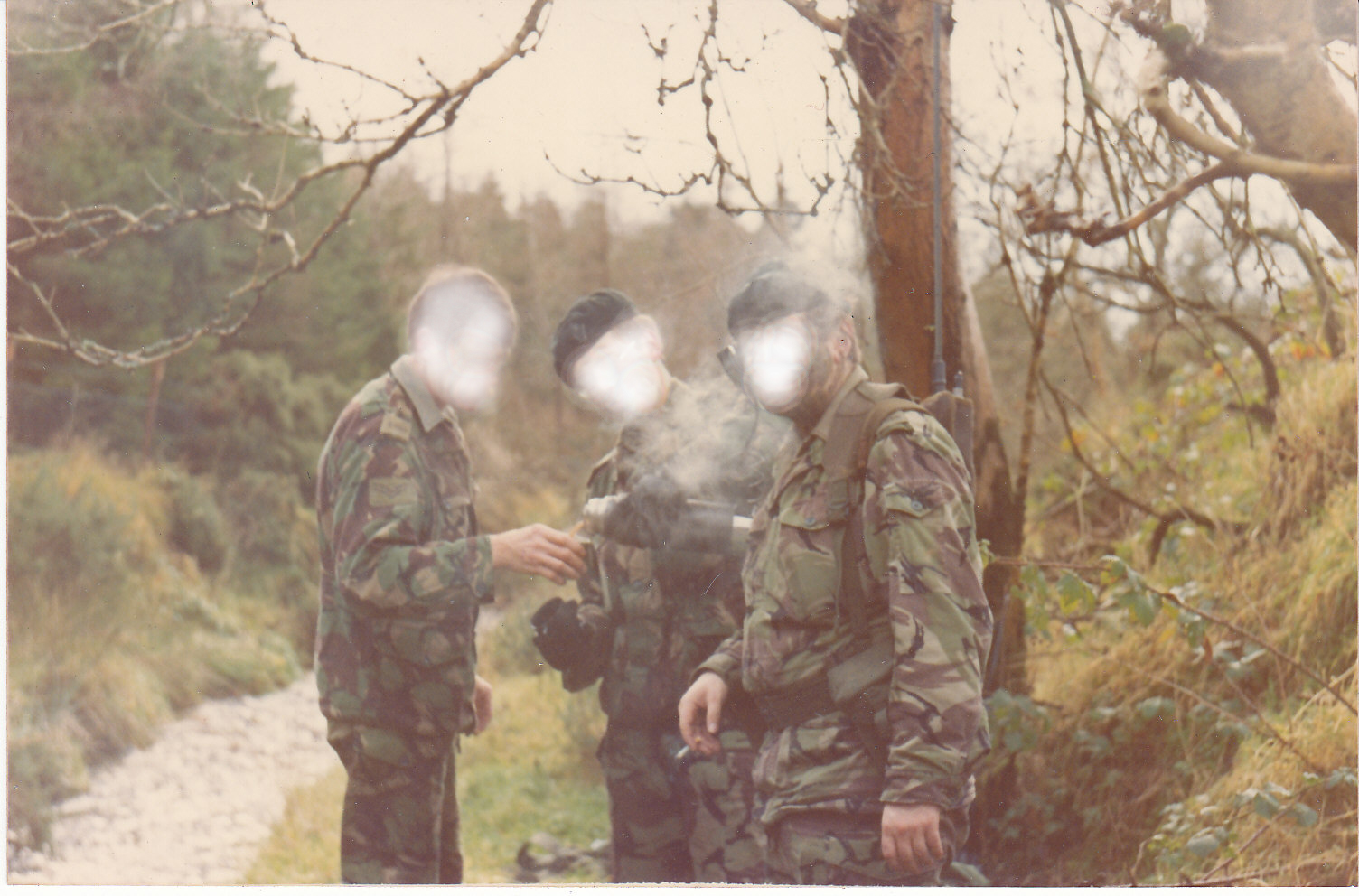
Ulster Defence Regiment soldiers in South Armagh wearing 1968 Pattern DPM combat jackets and trousers, with green shirts and berets. This was the basic temperate combat uniform during the 1970s and early 1980s, worn with green sweaters, ankle boots and puttees, and 1958 Pattern webbing.

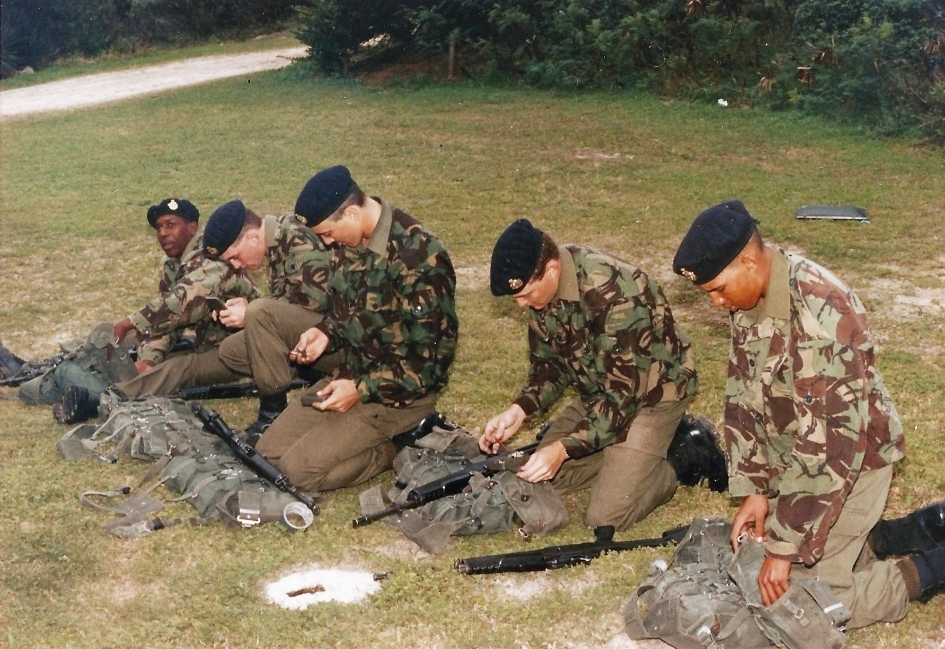
Royal Bermuda Regiment recruits in 1993 wearing green lightweight trousers, green shirts and sweaters, with 1968 Pattern DPM combat jackets, berets, and DMS high-boots and equipped with 1958 Pattern carrying equipment

=== Headgear ===
From the time of the New Model Army, broad-brimmed Flemish hats were worn. In 1660, after the restoration of the Monarchy, the Monmouth cap, a broad-brimmed, low-crowned felt hat, with one side of the brim generally turned up, was introduced. Then came the tall Flemish hat which developed into the low-crowned Carolina hat and the tricorne hat. During James II’s reign, the grenadier cap was introduced for grenadiers. Scottish Highland infantry regiments from about 1763 wore feather bonnets.

At the beginning of the 19th century the shako was introduced. In 1811, a lighter, smaller version of it was adopted. In 1816, an improved "Prussian" style of black felt shako with a glazed top was issued. This soon evolved into a shako much wider at the top and rather bell shaped. In 1844, the Albert shako was substituted. During the Crimean War it proved impractical for active service, and the round, undress, Kilmarnock forage cap was worn by most of the regiments engaged.

In 1851, the Kilmarnock forage cap was superseded in kilted Highland regiments by the Glengarry bonnet. After the Crimean War a lighter shako, after the French style of the period, was introduced. In 1868, the last model of British shako: smaller and tilted a little more to the front, was introduced. In the late 19th century, cap comforters were introduced as an informal working headdress.

Following the Battle of Waterloo, all members of the newly named Grenadier Guards were permitted to wear the bearskin. This privilege had previously been restricted to the grenadier company of the regiment. In 1831, this distinction was extended to the other two regiments of foot guards, Coldstream and Scots, in existence at that date. Bearskins were adopted by the Irish Guards and the Welsh Guards when raised in 1900 and 1915 respectively.

In 1879, the Home Service Helmet was introduced, and the Foreign Service pith helmet was used in hot climates. During the early years of the 20th century the blue Field Service Cap, the Brodrick cap and the Slouch hat were all worn. In the First World War, a khaki Balmoral bonnet was introduced in 1915 for wear in the trenches by Scottish infantry. This came to be known as the "bonnet, tam o' shanter".

The Brodrick cap was unpopular and was replaced in 1905, by a round khaki peaked cap used until the outbreak of World War II. In 1938, the Field Service Cap of the 1890s was re-introduced in a khaki version. During WWII it gave way to the General Service Cap. Cavalry regiments and the Tank Corps wore soft berets. After the war the beret proved a useful, practical and comfortable cap and is still used.

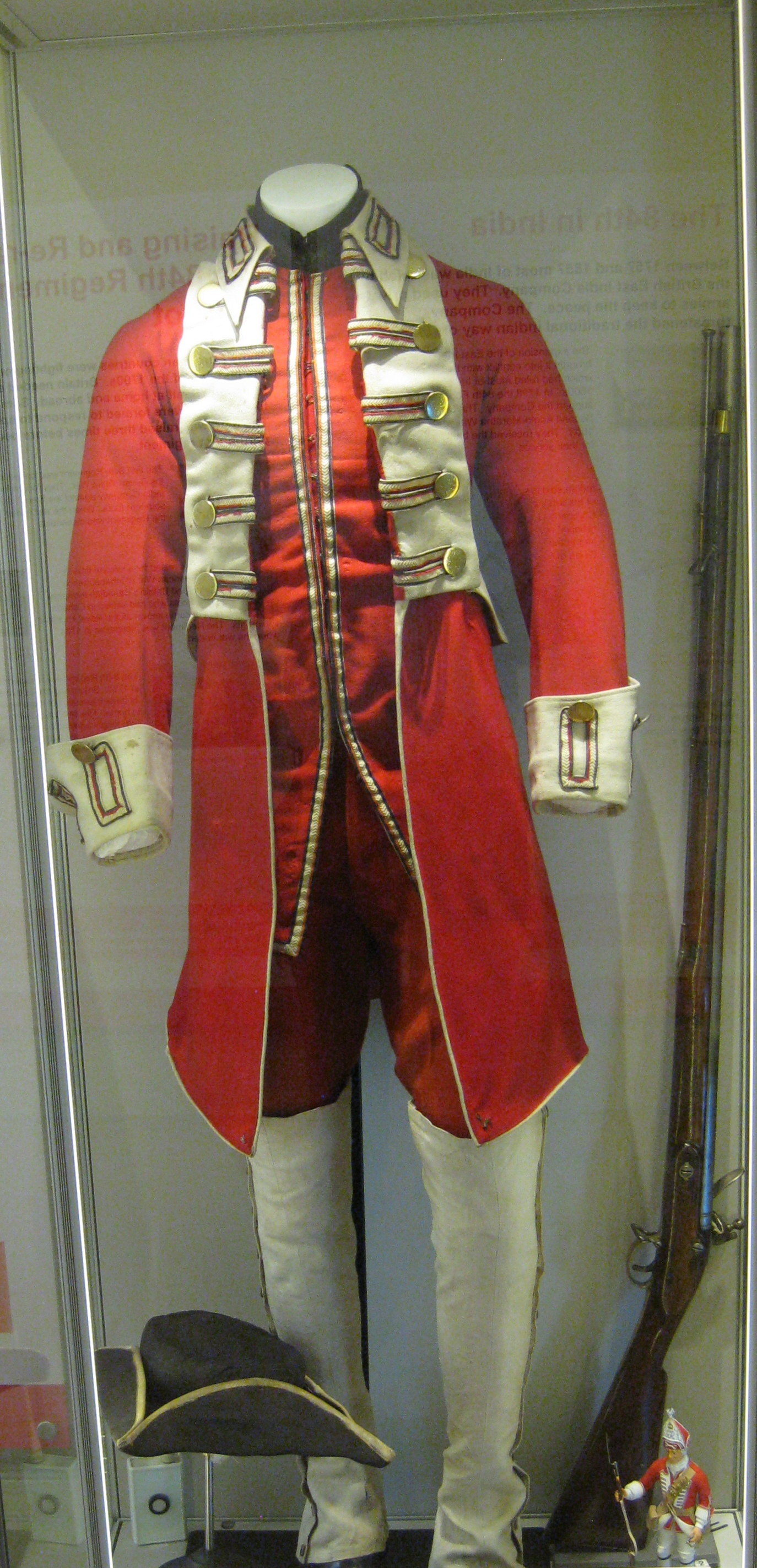
The 1758 uniform of the 65th Regiment of Foot with tricorne hat

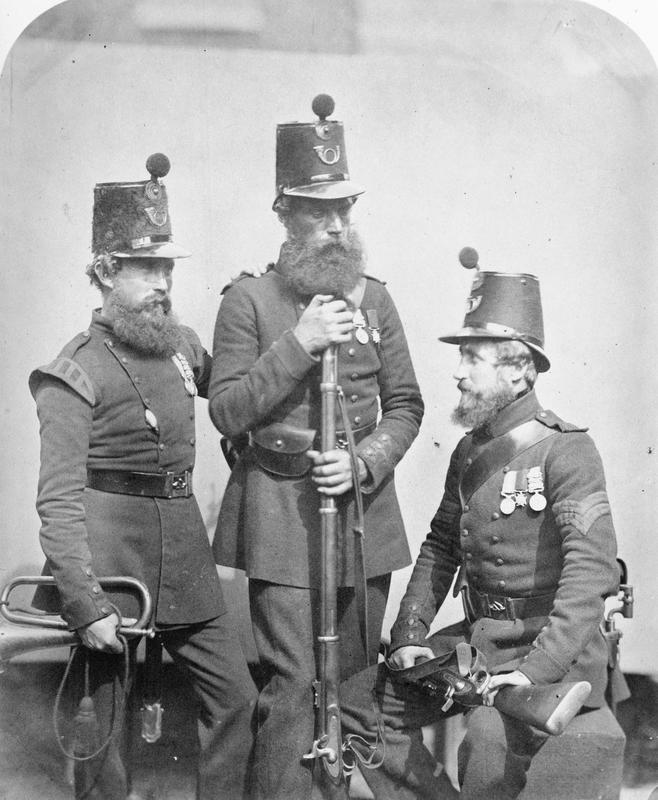
Soldiers of the Rifle Brigade wearing Albert shako, c. 1857

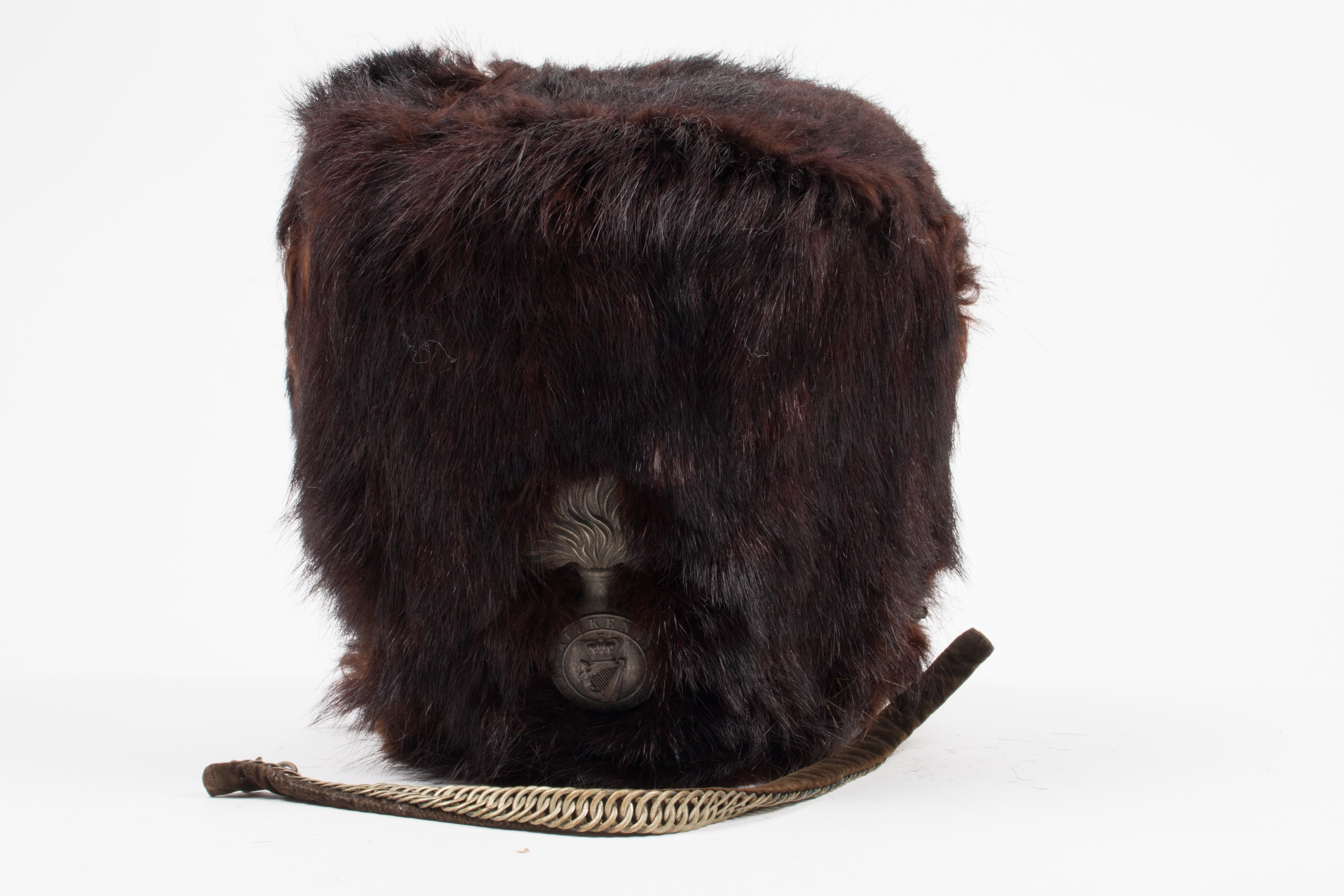
A bearskin hat (Busby) of Kilkenny Fusiliers, 1877-1881

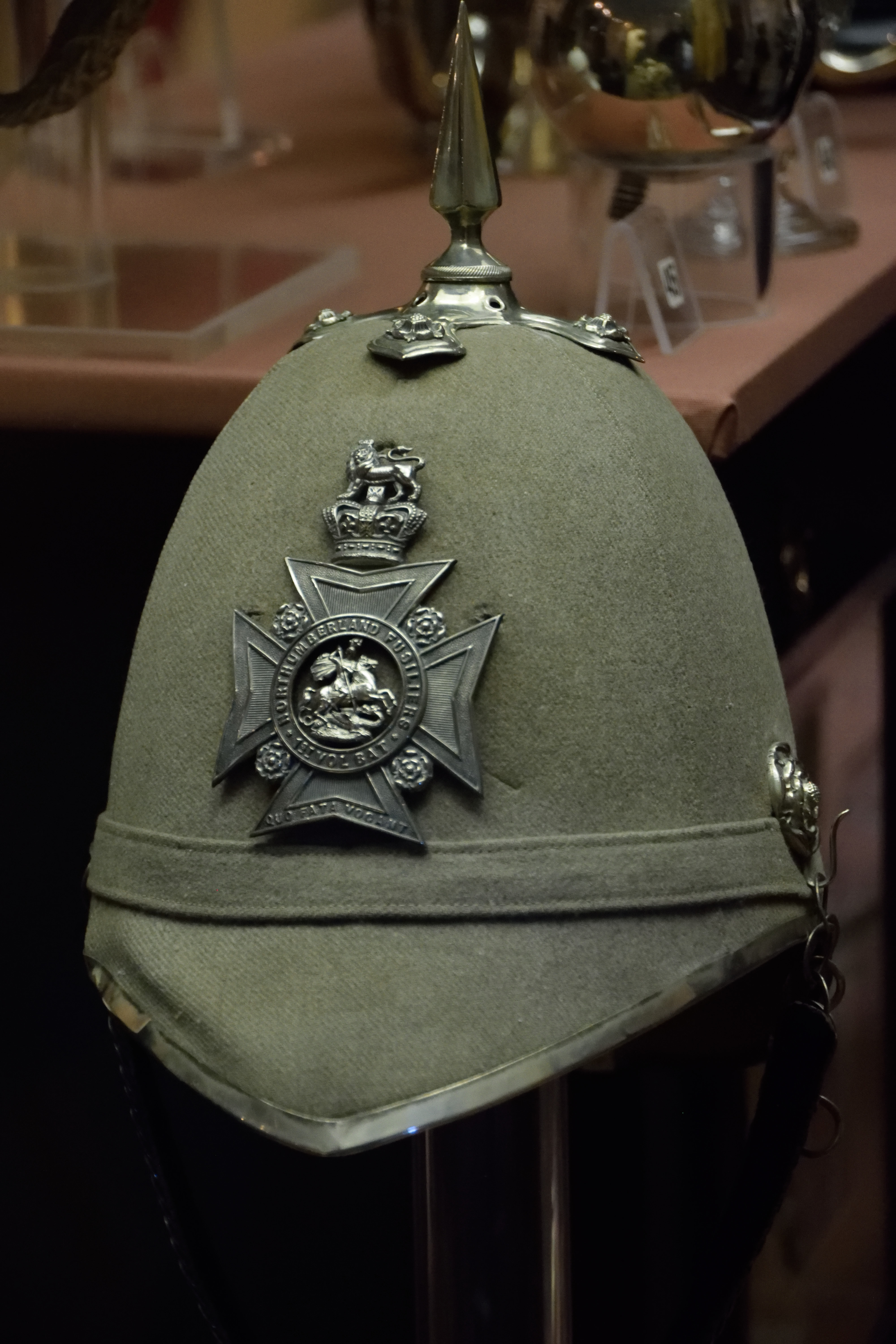
A Home Service helmet of the 1st Volunteer Battalion Northumberland Fusiliers, 1883-1893.

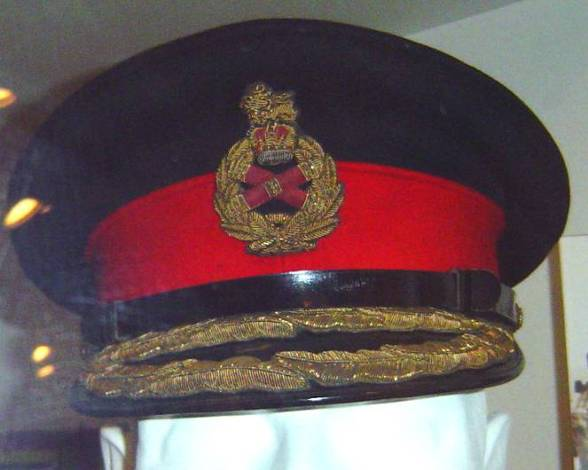
No 1 Dress cap

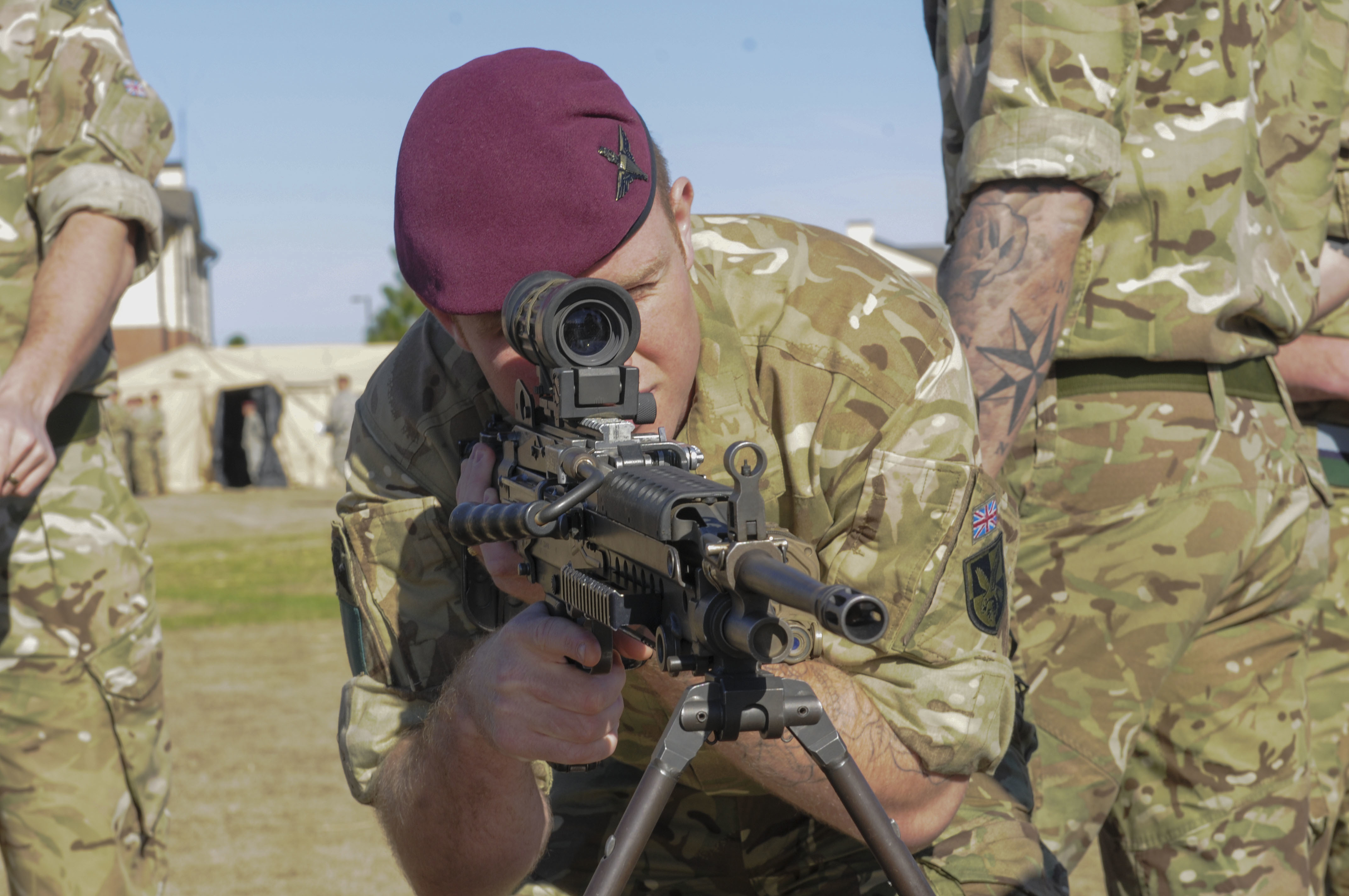
A soldier of the Parachute Regiment wearing the maroon beret

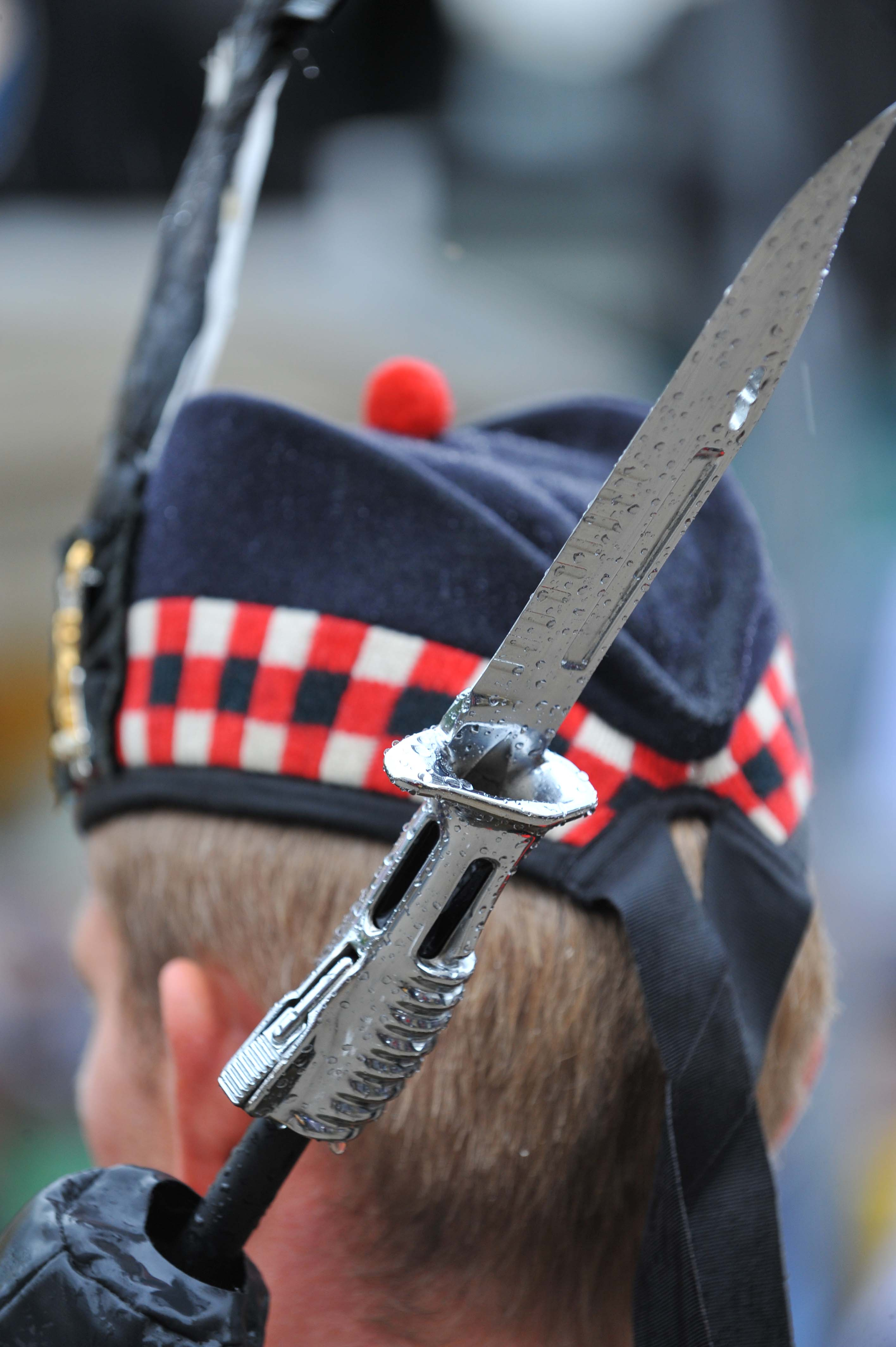
Glengarry worn on parade, Royal Regiment of Scotland, 2011

== See also ==
- British Armed Forces uniforms
- Combat uniform
- DPM Parachute Smock
- List of equipment of the British Army
- Military uniform
- Smock Windproof DPM
