= Service dress uniform =

Informal type of uniform

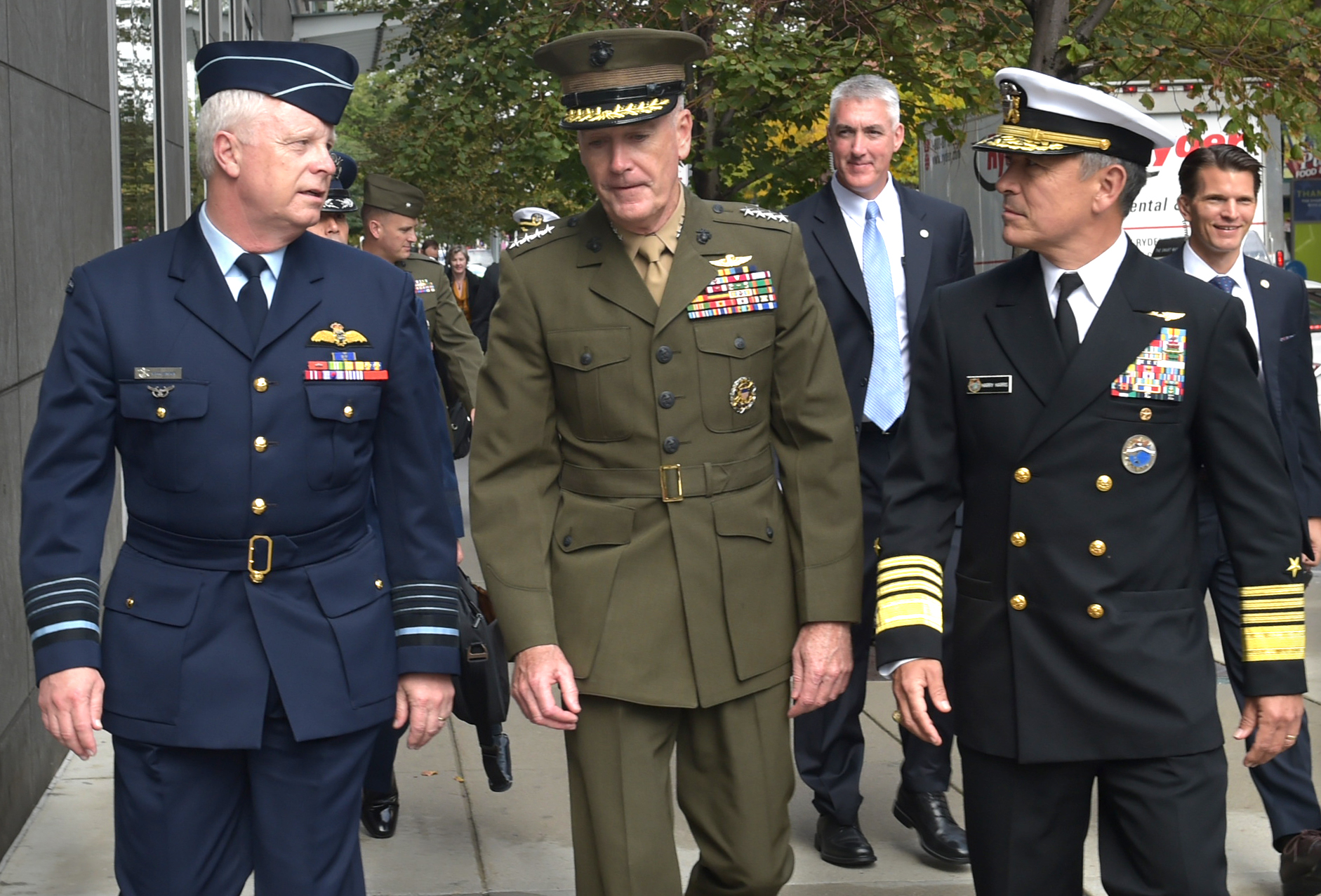
Senior officers wearing the service dress of the Royal Australian Air Force, US Marine Corps and US Navy

Service dress uniform is the informal type of uniform used by military, police, fire and other public uniformed services for everyday office, barracks and non-field duty purposes and sometimes for ceremonial occasions. It frequently consists of a jacket, trousers, dress shirt, and neck tie, along with orders, medals, and insignia. Design may depend on regiment or service branch, e.g. army, navy, air force, marines, etc. In Western dress codes, a service dress uniform is a permitted supplementary alternative equivalent to the civilian suit—sometimes collectively called undress or "dress clothes". As such, a service dress uniform is considered less formal than both full dress and mess dress uniforms, but more formal than combat uniforms.

Service dress uniforms were originally worn in active service in the field or at sea, but became relegated to office, barracks, and walking out dress as more practical field uniforms evolved. In some parts of some armed forces such as the British Army, service dress uniform may also be used for ceremonial occasions, gradually replacing in this role the full dress uniforms that had preceded them as field uniforms. In the United States Navy, for example, service dress uniforms are worn for official functions not rising to the level of full dress or mess dress uniforms. They are also commonly worn when travelling in official capacity, or when reporting to a command. They may be seasonal, with a white uniform worn in summer and darker versions in winter.

== History ==
The origins of the service dress can be traced back to when the British introduced khaki to their uniforms in India in the mid 18th century, with its official introduction into the regular British Army commenced in the early 1900s.

== Service dress uniform by country ==
=== Australia ===
The Service Dress in use by the Australian Army is the ceremonial dress, a continuation of the uniform of the world wars.

=== Canada ===
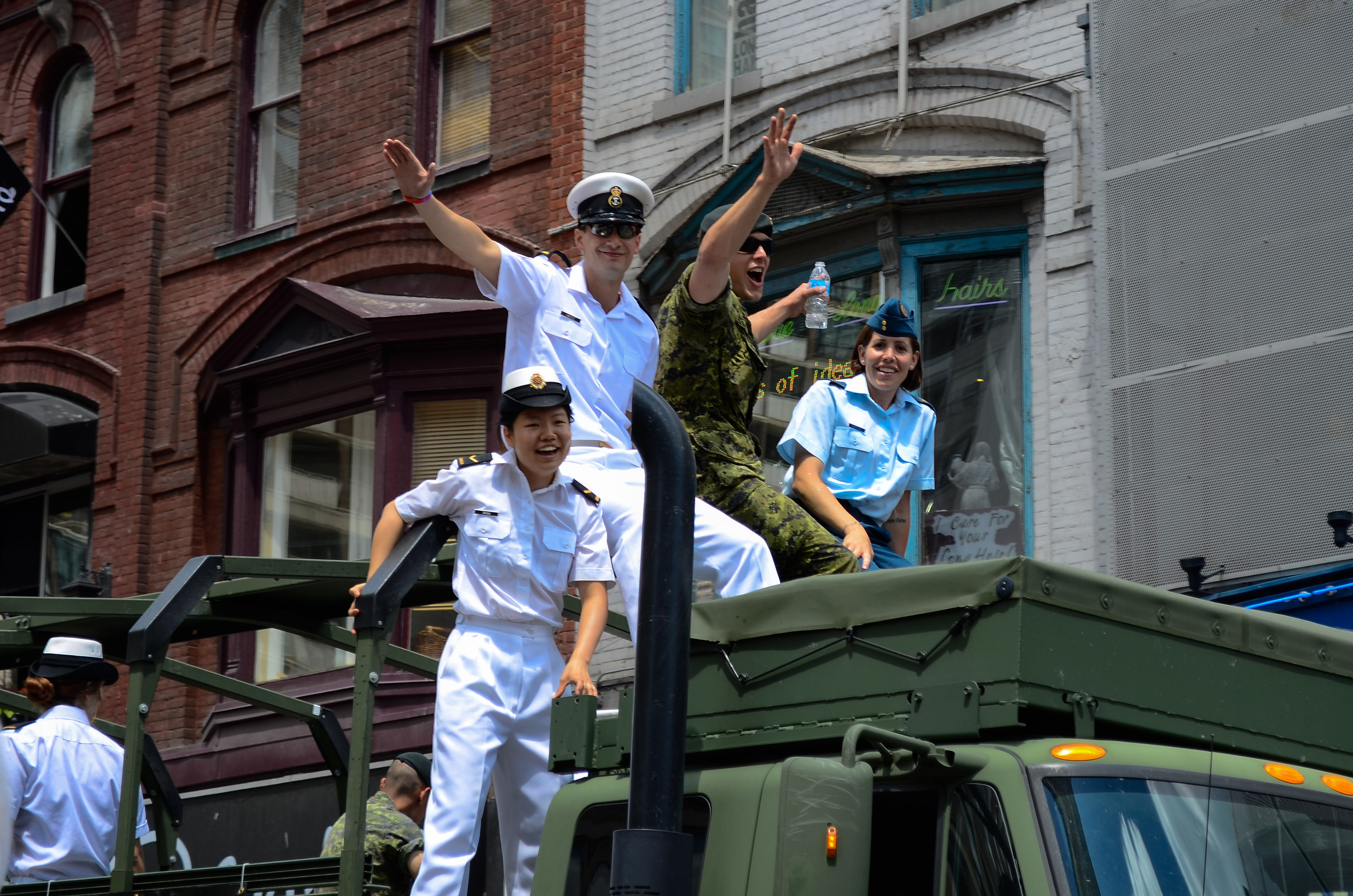
Members of the Canadian Army, Royal Canadian Air Force, and Royal Canadian Navy, with the latter two elements wearing their respective No. 3B Service Dress uniforms

Although the Canadian Armed Forces is a single service, its respective environmental commands maintain "distinctive environmental uniforms", distinct for its specific environmental branch (including the Canadian Army, the Royal Canadian Air Force, the Royal Canadian Navy and Canadian Special Operations Forces Command). Service dress is listed as No. 3 Service Dress in the Canadian Armed Forces order of dress. The order of dress may be further split into five variant.

The complete service dress uniform, known as No. 3 Duty includes the service's headgear, neck tie, name tag. The uniform's jacket, trousers, and collared shirt, are coloured in the style of their environmental command. A skirt may be used by females members in place of trousers.

Service dress with a long-sleeve collared shirt and no jacket is known as No. 3A, while service dress with a short-sleeved collared shirt and no jacket is No. 3B. Wearing an authorized sweater over the collared shirt, instead of a jacket is known as No. 3C. No. 3D Service Dress is the Canadian Armed Forces tropical service dress, and is similar in wear to No. 3B, except it is coloured in tan; and shorts may be worn in place of trousers.

=== Hungary ===
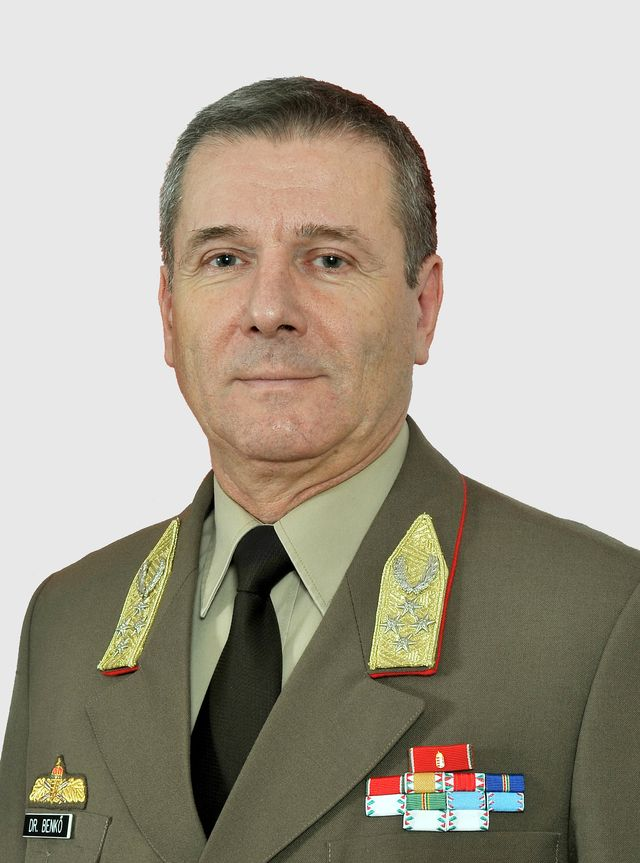
Chief of General Staff Colonel General Tibor Benkő dressed in his Service dress uniform

The current Hungarian Defence Forces has a Service dress uniform for each of the two branches. Hungarian Ground Forces have the dark field brown 1993M Ground Forces Service Dress Uniform (Hungarian: 1993M köznapi egyenruha, lit. '1993M uniform for everyday'). The uniforms are using different coloured branch colours. The Hungarian Air Force branch has a dark blue 1993M Air Force Service Dress Uniform (Hungarian: 1993M repülős köznapi egyenruha, lit. '1993M Air forces uniform for everyday'). The uniforms' only branch colour is light blue. The Ground Forces' Hungarian River Guard has the 1995M Naval Service Dress Uniform (Hungarian: 1995M Hadihajós köznapi egyenruha, lit. '1993M Naval uniform for everyday'). The mentioned last two uniforms have a Peaked cap, but the Ground Forces have a stiffed dark field brown Bocskai hat. During winter a field brown or dark blue grandcoat or trenchcoat is allowed to wear. The uniforms are worn with light brown long sleeved shirts with rank insignia on the shoulder straps, dark field brown trousers with generals and officers stripes. Red colour for Ground Forces and light blue for Air Force branch. During the summer the 1993M Service Dress Uniforms can be worn without the jacket and white short sleeved light brown shirt. The headgear is the dark field brown Bocskai hat or a Side cap.

=== Israel ===
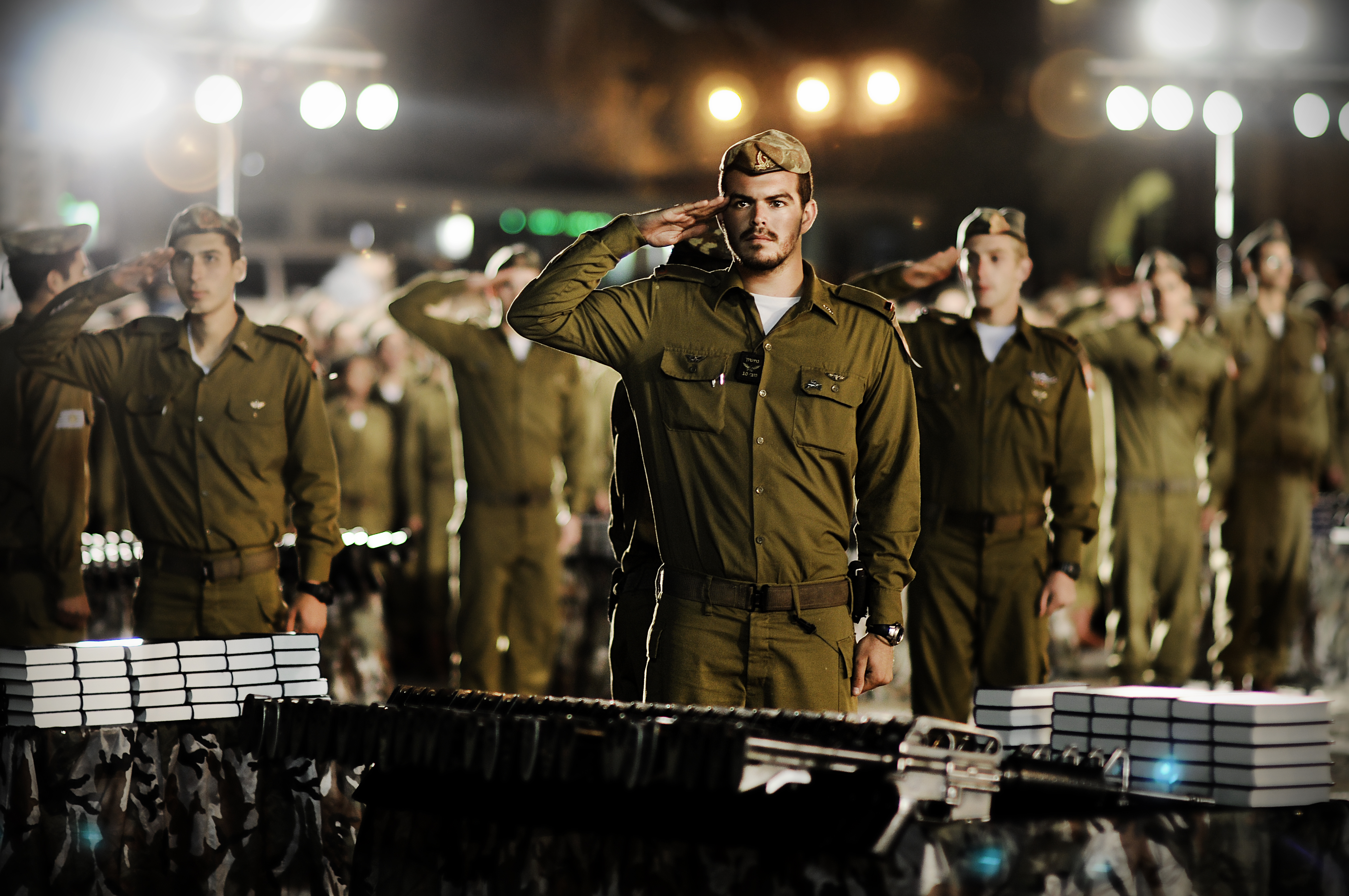
Members of the Israeli Defense Forces in their olive-green Madei Alef service dress uniform

When founded in 1948, only khaki combat uniforms were issued to the Israeli Defense Forces Ground Arm. In April, 1948, the first military parade was held, in which soldiers wore the Hittlemacher hat, a square cap with a flap at the back to protect the neck from sun exposure. A winter uniform similar to British Army No. 2 Dress was introduced in the 1950s, and uniforms similar to British Army Barrack Dress was often worn for ceremonial parades from the 1950s and 1960s. For female soldiers, these uniforms included skirts, brown dress shoes (known as Golda shoes for Golda Meir) and caps similar to those worn by airline stewardesses known as rooster caps.

Presently, the Madei Alef uniforms serves as the IDF's service dress uniform. Made out of rayon, the uniforms consist of a shirt, trousers, sweater, jacket or blouse, and shoes or boots. The general service dress uniform is coloured olive-green, although the Madei Alef uniforms used by the Israeli Sea Corps and Air Force are coloured beige.

=== Spain ===
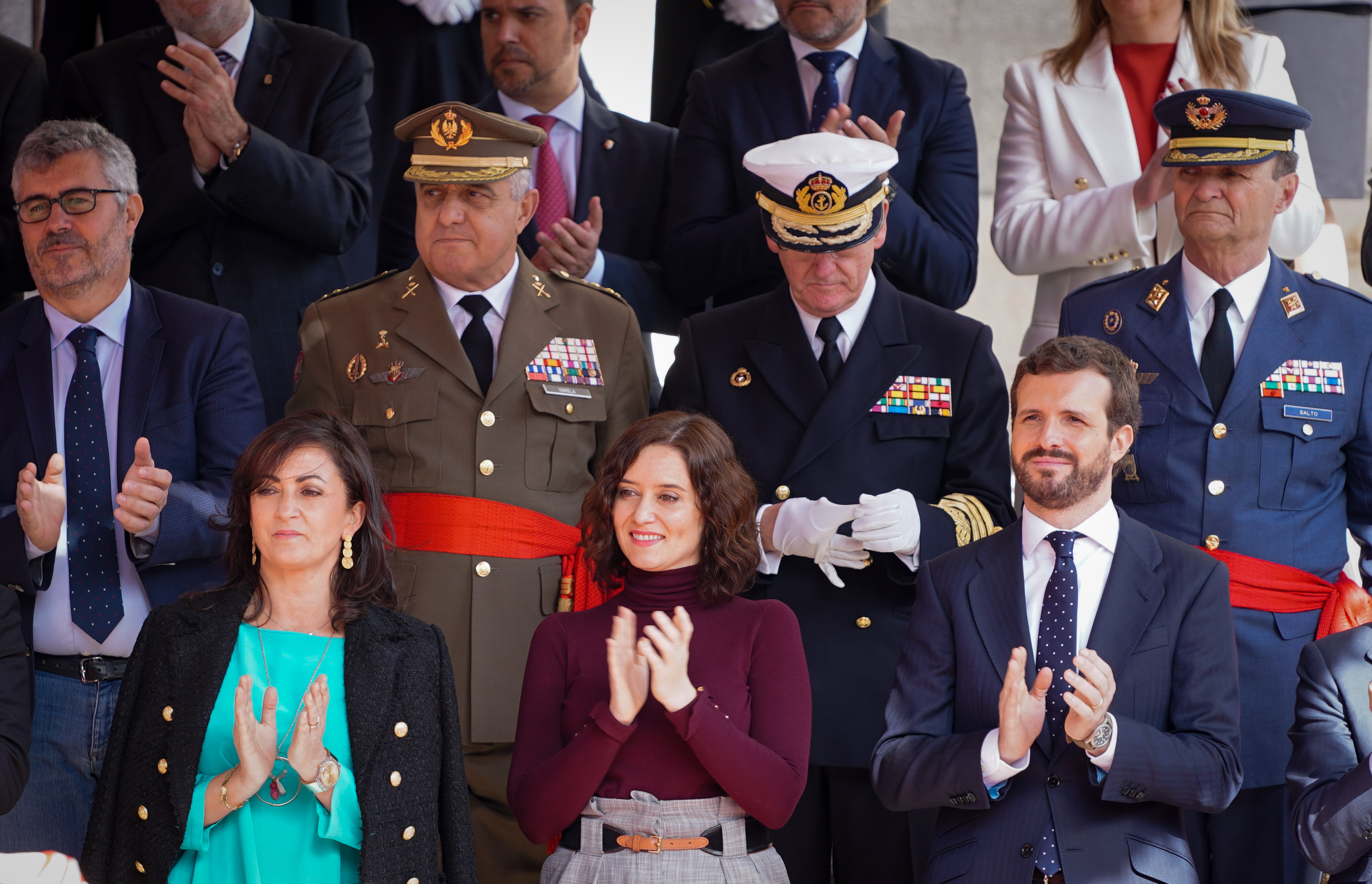
Spanish Army, Navy and Air Force and Space Officers with Service Dress uniforms during start of the legislative session in February 3, 2020.

The five service branches of the Spanish Armed Forces each maintain their own variant of service dress.

=== United Kingdom ===
==== British Army ====
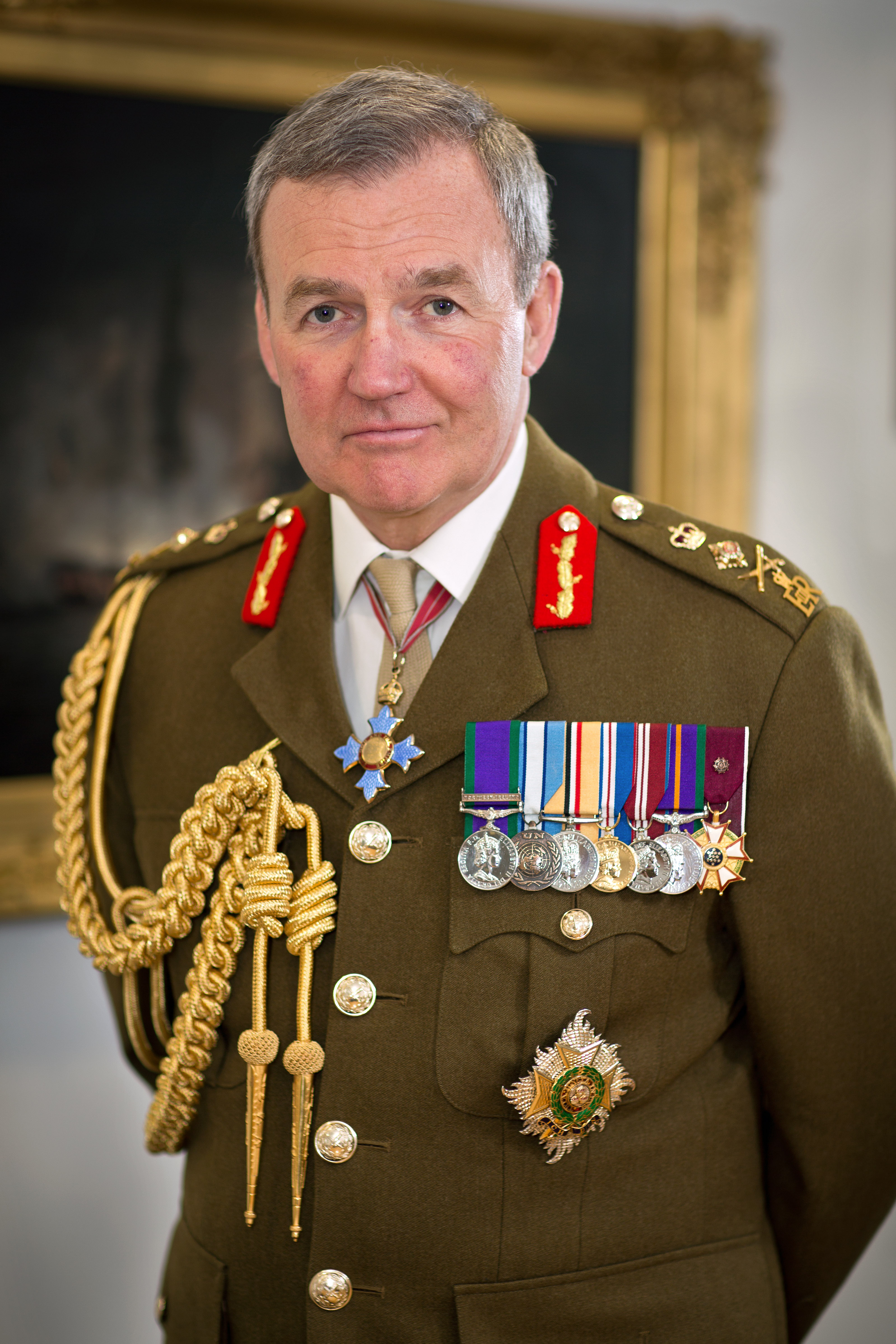
General Sir Nicholas Houghton dressed in the British Army's No. 2 Service Dress

The British Army has issued khaki Service Dress uniforms for use in the field shortly since after the Second Boer War in the early 1900s. Since World War II, the uniform has been referred to as No. 2 Dress, with the tunic being swapped out for a jacket with an open collar for wear with collared shirt and tie. Berets may be worn in place of a peaked cap. Additionally, officers of the British Army are authorized to wear a second variant of service dress, known as No. 4 Warm Weather Service Dress. The uniform is similar to No. 2 Service Dress, except it is stone grey coloured, made from a polyester/wool worsted mix. No. 4 Service Dress is typically worn on warm-weather formal occasions not including parades.

==== Royal Marines ====
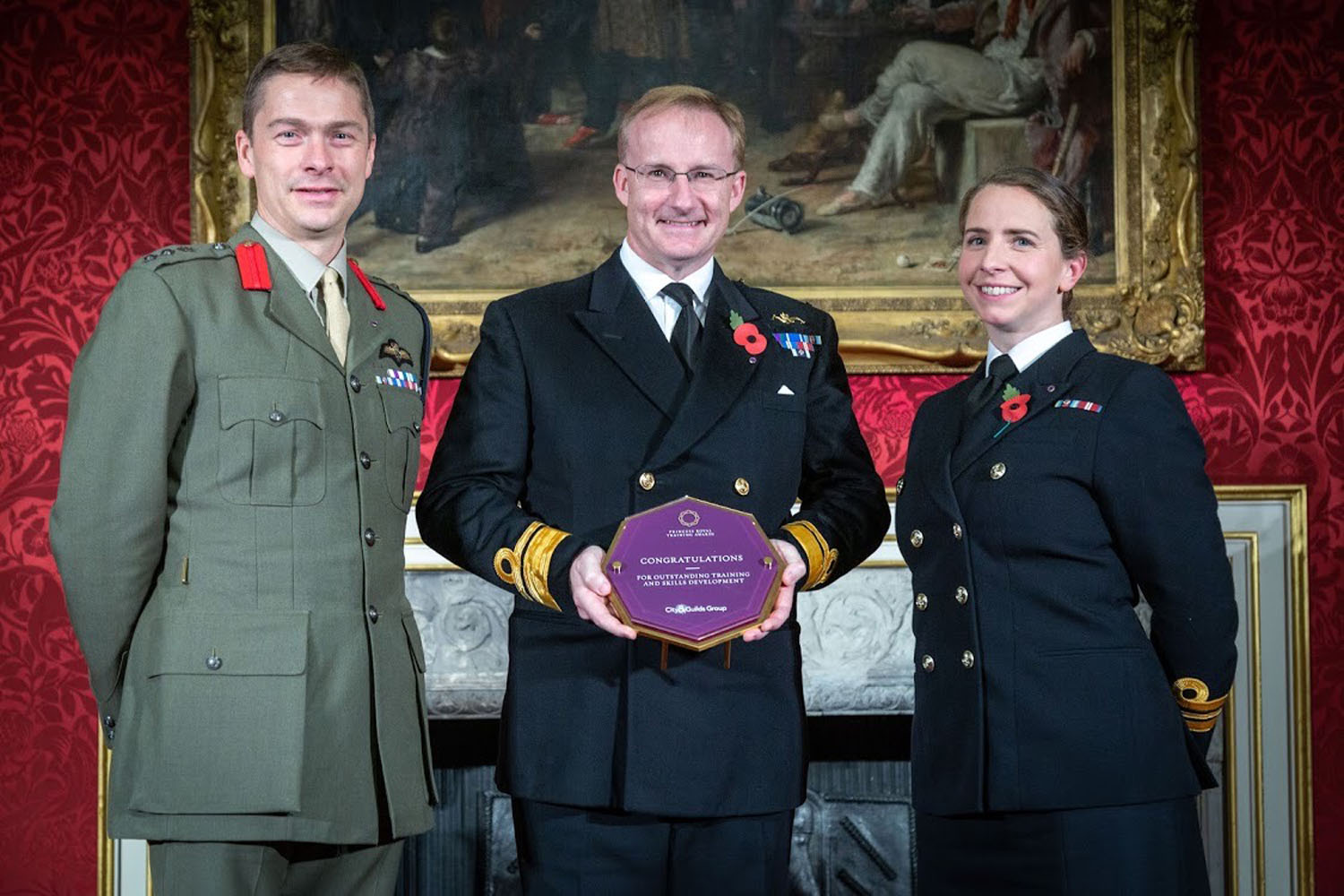
The green Parade Lovats, left, worn by an RM officer

In the Royal Marines, the equivalent of British Army service dress is Number 1B dress 'Parade Lovats'.

=== United States ===
The five service branches of the United States Armed Forces each maintain their own variant of service dress.

==== United States Air Force ====
The service dress uniforms used by the United States Air Force consist of a blue jacket and matching trousers worn with a light blue shirt and blue tie. A side cap or peaked cap are worn as headwear. The tradition of blue service uniforms date back to 1949, shortly after the Air Force was spun-off from the Army. The first version were made in a shade known as "Uxbridge Blue" and were developed and manufactured at the former Bachman Uxbridge Worsted Company in Uxbridge, Massachusetts. The current version was introduced in the 1990s. Members of the Civil Air Patrol, the United States Air Force Auxiliary, are authorized to wear the uniform with distinctive markings.

==== United States Army ====
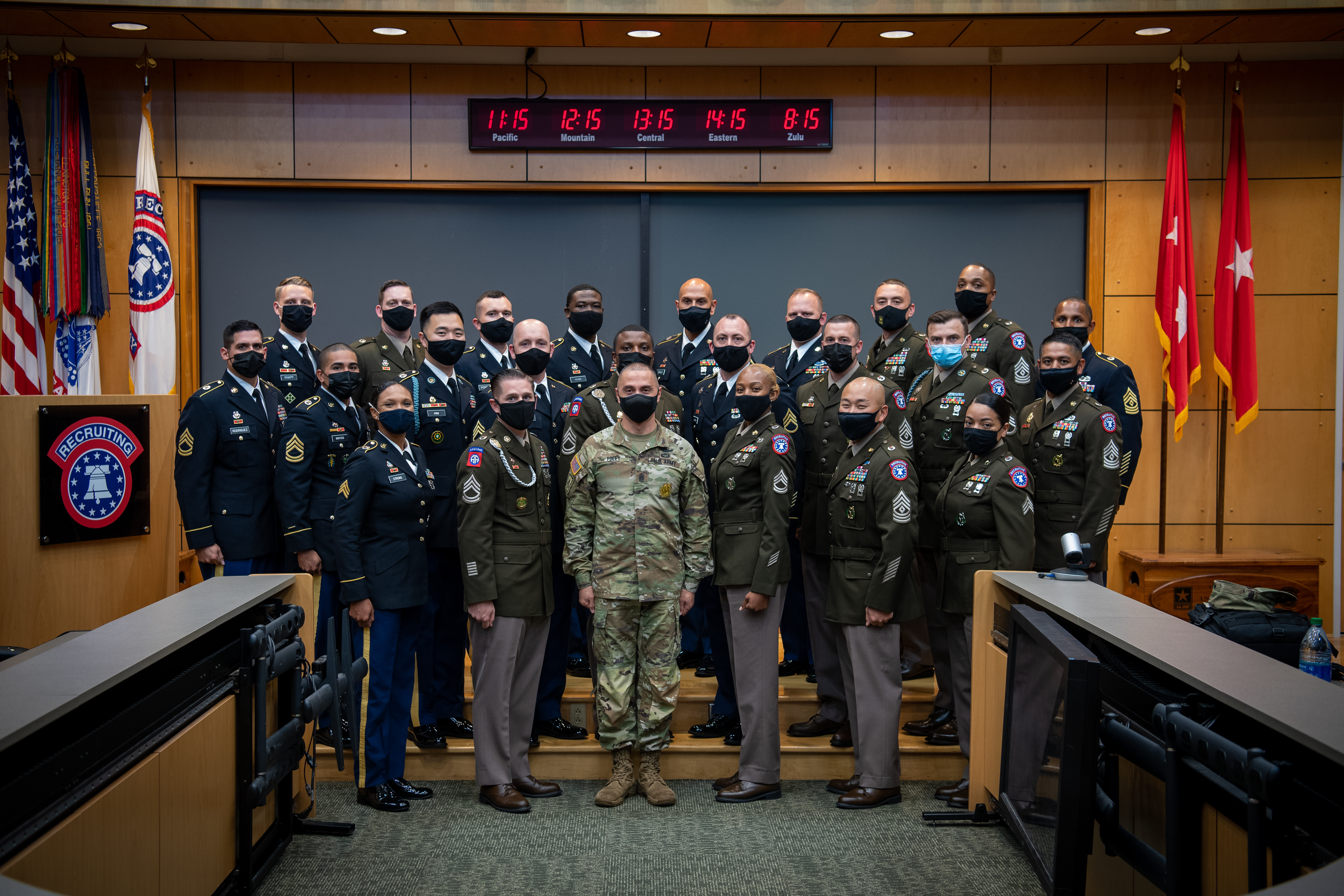
US Army sergeants wearing service dress uniforms at a conference

The United States Army authorizes the Army Service Uniform as its daily wear service uniform. Since 2018, there are two versions authorized, a green uniform and a blue one.

In November 2018, the U.S. Army announced the introduction of a new green service uniform modeled after the "pinks and greens" service uniforms worn by officers during the Second World War and Korean War. This uniform consists of a dark olive drab coat with belted waist, light taupe trousers, tan shirt, olive necktie, olive garrison cap, and brown shoes. A peaked cap is optional. This uniform became standard-issue beginning in 2020 and becomes mandatory in 2027.

The blue service uniform consists of a dark blue coat, light blue trousers (dark blue for general officers), a white turndown-collar shirt, black necktie (neck tab for women), a black beret, and black shoes. Women may wear a dark blue skirt instead of trousers. A peaked cap may be worn instead of the beret. The blue uniform's colours are based on the traditional colours used by most U.S. Army uniforms until 1902, when the introduction of khaki and olive drab uniforms relegated blue uniforms to full-dress use and off-duty wear until 1917, when issuance was halted due to the First World War. The current version of the uniform was reintroduced in 1957 as an optional full dress uniform. It was authorized as the army-wide service dress uniform in 2008, becoming standard-issue in 2010, when it replaced the previous green service uniform in use since 1954. With the reintroduction of a green service uniform, the blue uniform returns to being an optional uniform for more formal occasions.

==== United States Coast Guard ====
Members of the United States Coast Guard pose for a photo in service dress blue uniforms.

In 1972, the current Coast Guard Service Dress Blue uniform was introduced for wear by both officers and enlisted personnel; the transition was completed during 1974. Relatively similar in appearance to the old-style U.S. Air Force uniforms, the uniform consists of a blue four-pocket single breasted jacket and trousers in a slightly darker shade. Unlike the U.S. Navy, officers and CPO's do not wear khaki; all personnel wear the same colour uniform.

== See also ==
- Military uniform
  - Full dress uniform
  - Mess dress uniform
  - Combat uniform
