= British Battledress =

Commonwealth WWII military uniform

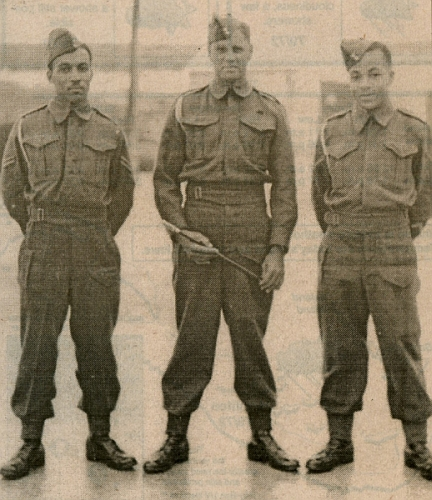
A Warrant Officer and Non-commissioned officers of the Bermuda Militia Artillery wear Battledress at the Examination Battery, St. David's, Bermuda, c. 1944.

Battledress (BD), later named the No. 5 Uniform, was the combat uniform worn by British Commonwealth and Imperial forces through the Second World War.

Battledress was introduced into the British Army just before the start of the war and worn until the 1960s. Other nations introduced their own variants of battledress during the war, including Australia, Canada, India, New Zealand, South Africa, and the United States and after the Second World War, including Argentina, Belgium, Norway, the Netherlands, and Greece.

It was worn mostly but not exclusively in temperate climates. In some armies it continued in use into the 1970s. During the Second World War and thereafter this uniform was also used for formal parades (including mounting the guard at Buckingham Palace) until the re-introduction of separate parade uniforms in the late 1950s.

== Development and introduction ==
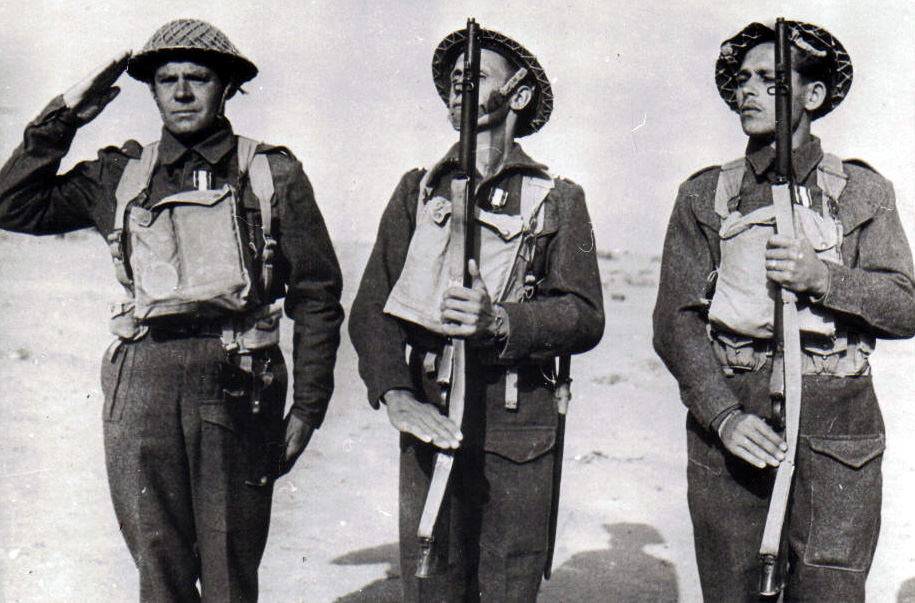
Members of the Polish Carpathian Brigade being decorated after seeing action at Tobruk during the North African Campaign. They are fitted with British equipment, including Battledress.

From the early 1930s, the British War Office began research on a replacement for the Service Dress that had been a combined field and dress uniform since the early 1900s. Initially conducted on a small scale over several years, some of the ideas tested included deerstalker hats and safari jackets. After extensive field trials of other uniforms, Battledress, Serge (often referred to as 1937 Pattern) was adopted just before the Second World War. The uniform was designed with the needs of mechanised infantry in mind, and was inspired by contemporary wool 'ski suits' that were less restrictive to the wearer, used less material, were warm even while wet and were more suited to vehicular movement than Service Dress.

Attempting to create a more standardised uniform across much of the British military, it was composed of a fairly streamlined short jacket of wool serge that buttoned to the outside of high-waisted wool serge trousers. The sleeves of the jacket had a forward curve built into them so that they were more comfortable to wear prone, shouldering a rifle, or seated holding a steering wheel for instance, although they tended to show multiple wrinkles near the inside of the elbow when the soldier's arms were held straight at the sides. On the trousers, there was a large map pocket on the front near the left knee and a special pocket for a field dressing near the right front pocket (on the upper hip).

One problem often developed, the gap between the blouse and trousers would open up in extreme movement and buttons popped, so braces were issued; in some cases a sweater was worn. A woollen shirt was typically worn under the wool jacket. Wearing an open collar jacket (with tie) was initially restricted to officers, other ranks buttoning the top button of the jacket and closing the collar with a double hook-and-eye arrangement. Short webbing anklets covered the gap between the trousers and the ankle boots, further adding to the streamlined look and keeping dirt out of the boots without having to use a taller, more expensive leather boot.

Battledress was issued widely beginning in 1939 in the British Army (as well as the Canadian Army, who produced their own, almost identical, copy of Battledress after the outbreak of war), though shortages meant that some units of the British Expeditionary Force went to France in Service Dress. Some officers initially refused to wear Battledress themselves, contrary to orders. One Guards major declared: "I don't mind dying for my country but I'm not going to die dressed like a third-rate chauffeur".

== Variants ==
Battledress, Serge being the original pattern of battledress uniform commonly referred to as '1937 Pattern', the blouse had a fly front, pleated pockets with concealed buttons and an unlined collar, the trousers having a large map pocket on the left leg front with a concealed button and a small, single pleat dressing pocket on the front of the right hip. The trousers have four belt loops which fasten at the top with buttons; tabs and buttons are fitted to the cuffs to fasten the trousers at the ankle.

1940 Pattern Battledress introduced in 1940 saw some small changes to the original design, a lined collar and slightly closer cut to the blouse and trousers with a new dressing pocket on the trousers with two pleats and a revolving shank button.

1940 "Austerity" Pattern Battledress (occasionally labelled 1942 Pattern) was introduced in 1942; it deleted the fly front so the front buttons, as well as the pocket and cuff buttons, were now exposed. Pocket pleats to the blouse were removed, early manufacture included two inside pockets but this was soon reduced to a single inside pocket. Plastic buttons were introduced, rather than the brass dished buttons of Battledress, Serge. The trousers lost their belt loops and ankle tabs, the pocket buttons were now exposed and made of brown or green plastic like those of the blouse.

Officers were permitted to tailor the collar of their blouses so as to wear a collared shirt and tie.

Battle Dress [sic], Olive Drab, War Aid was made in the US for the British Army and was widely seen in the Mediterranean theatre. The blouse featured exposed buttons on the outer pockets, which also bore no box pleats. The fly front of Battledress, Serge was retained. Cuff buttons were exposed, and there were two inside pockets. A small, internal hanger loop was introduced to the collar. The collar was closed by double hook-and-eye arrangement. Tailoring was of good quality and the wool blend tended to be finer than British-made blouses. Type-specific plastic buttons were introduced.

Canadian Battledress never had a 1940-type pattern introduced, though the collar closure did change from a set of hooks and eyes to a flap and button in about 1943. The Canadian version was also a much greener shade of khaki than the standard British version. It was greenish with some brown, rather than brownish with some green. Buttons were green painted steel, with a central bar across the middle for the thread to hold in place.

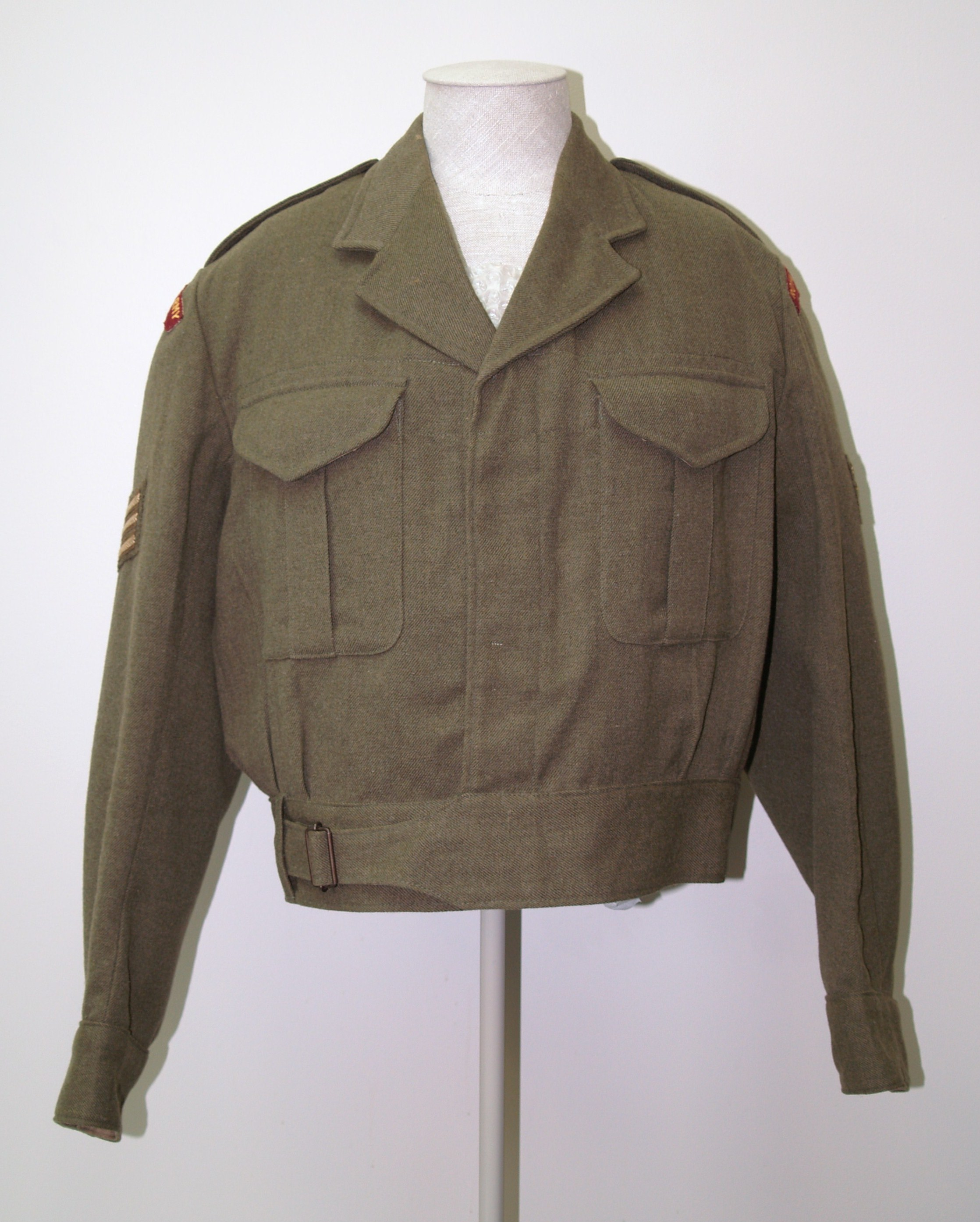
New Zealand battledress 1959–1961, worn in Malaya and Borneo conflicts

New Zealand Battledress was almost identical to British 1937 pattern Battledress, Serge but the wool tended to be much darker brown, while the stitching was a contrasting light colour. The NZ blouse had a six button fly front, rather than the British five.

Australian Battledress blouses were almost identical to British Battledress, Serge. The trousers were closer to British 1940 Pattern. Both tended to be a much greener colour than British BD. Australians didn't wear BD during World War II, but their own version of Service Dress; their BD was for export to other Commonwealth nations, such as Britain. Buttons were in sherardised steel or plastic resin. British battledress was only adopted by Australian military in the latter part of the Korean War.

South African Battledress appeared in both khaki wool and tan twill. The short jacket was referred to as a bunny jacket.

Overalls, Denim were a version of Battle Dress intended for working clothing, and were produced from khaki coloured cotton denim, with several manufacturer's variants. It was issued a size larger as it was intended to be worn over the regular uniform. Buttons were fixed through small holes in the denim material and kept in place by a split pin. The buttons could be easily removed for laundering which, due to denim overalls being workwear, was more frequent than for serge battledress. 90,000 sets of denim overalls were issued to the Local Defence Volunteers (later the Home Guard) as their main uniform, in the weeks following their establishment in May 1940. Three months later, supplies of overalls were so depleted that the standard serge Battledress began to be issued to the Home Guard instead and in December, it was announced that Battledress would fully replace Home Guard overalls as soon as supplies were available.

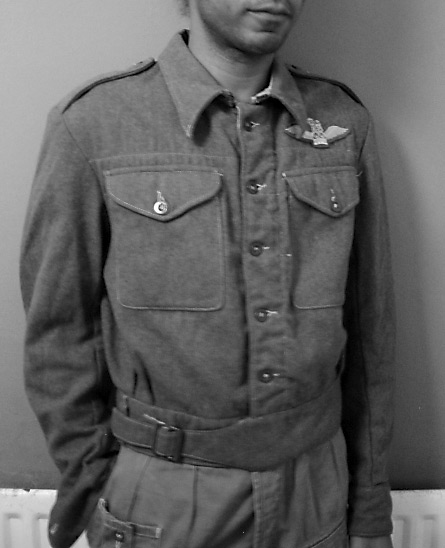
1940 Pattern battledress blouse.

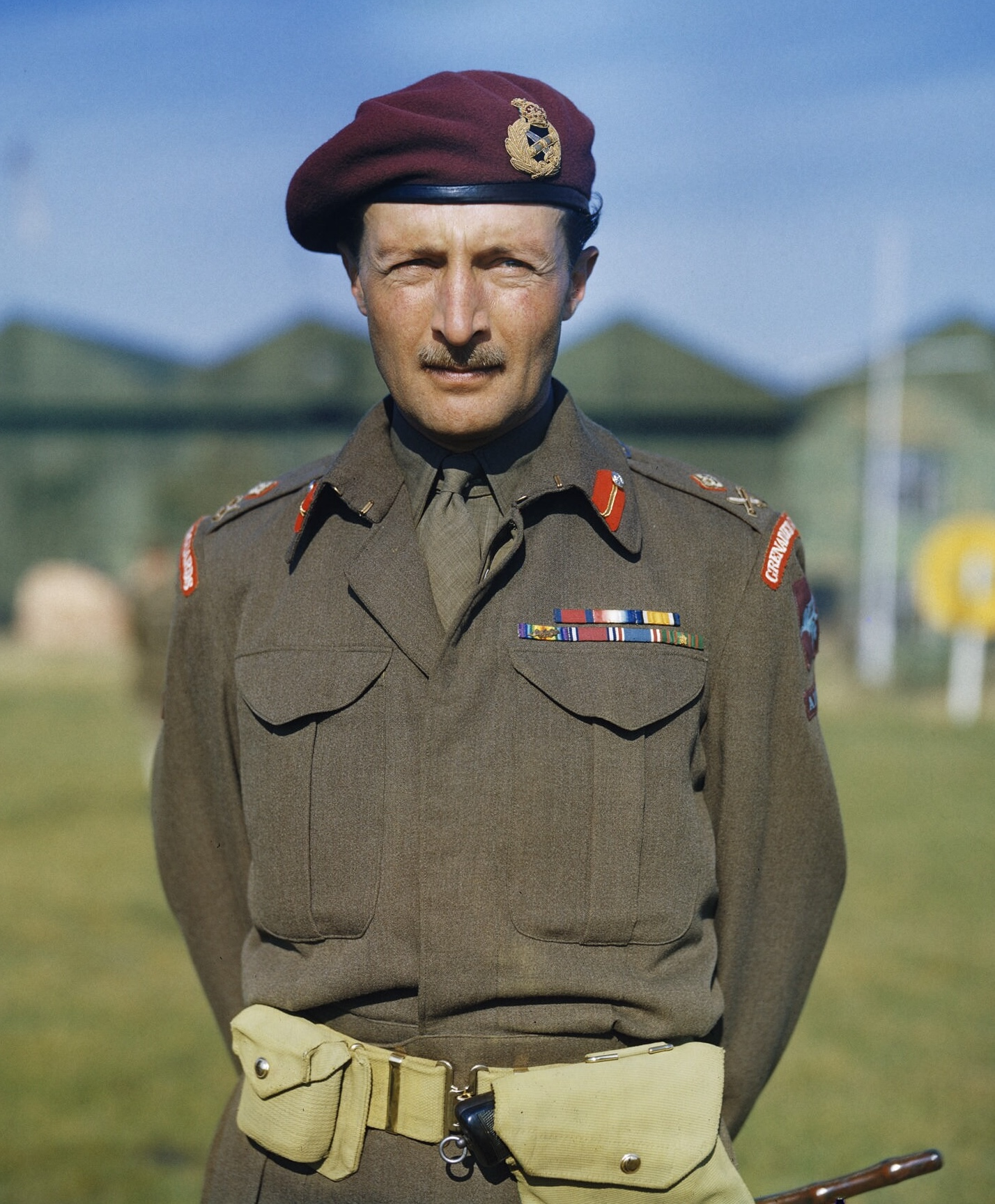
Lieutenant General Sir Frederick Arthur Montague Browning in a specially tailored battledress blouse with faced lapels.

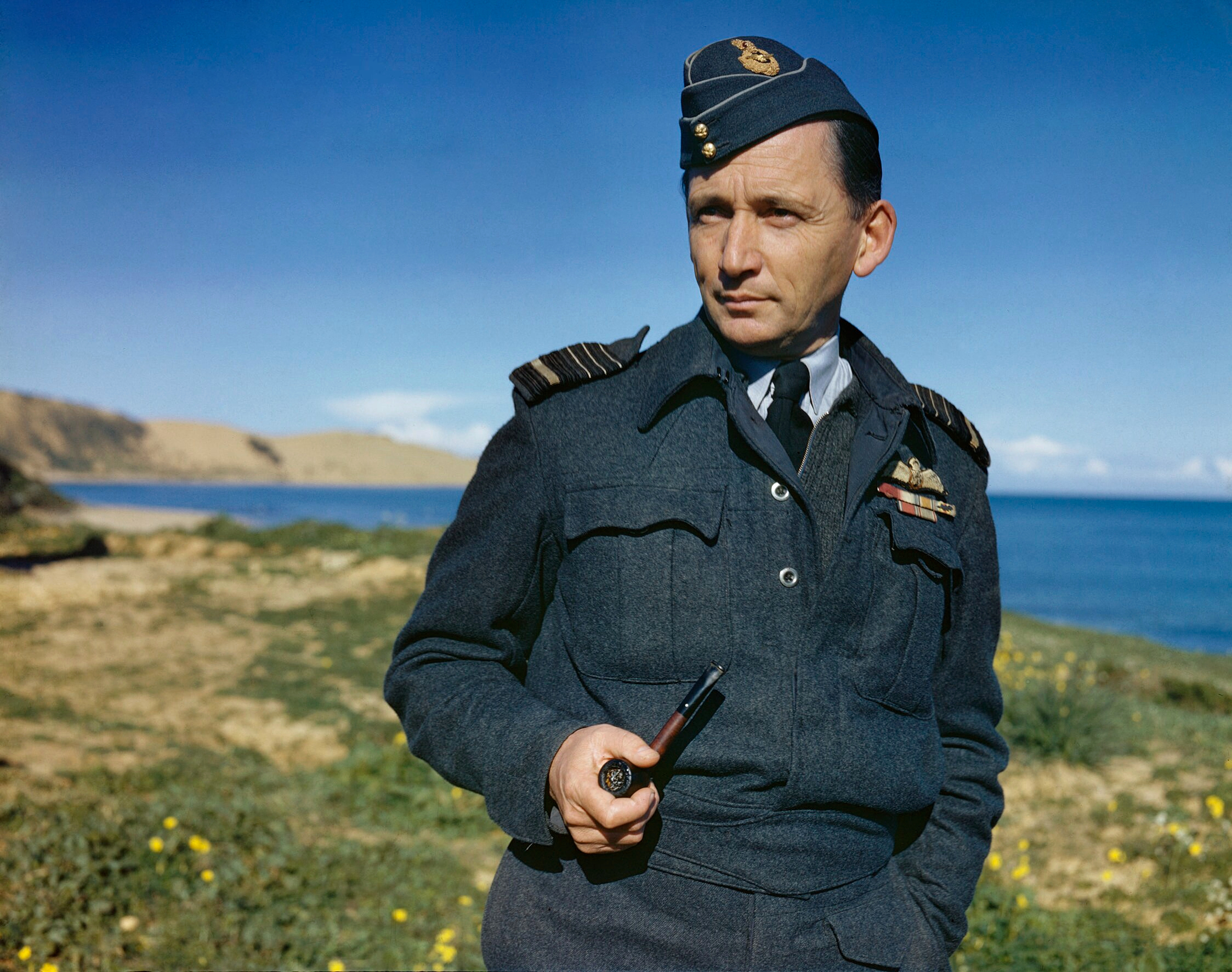
Air Chief Marshal Tedder wearing RAF war service dress.

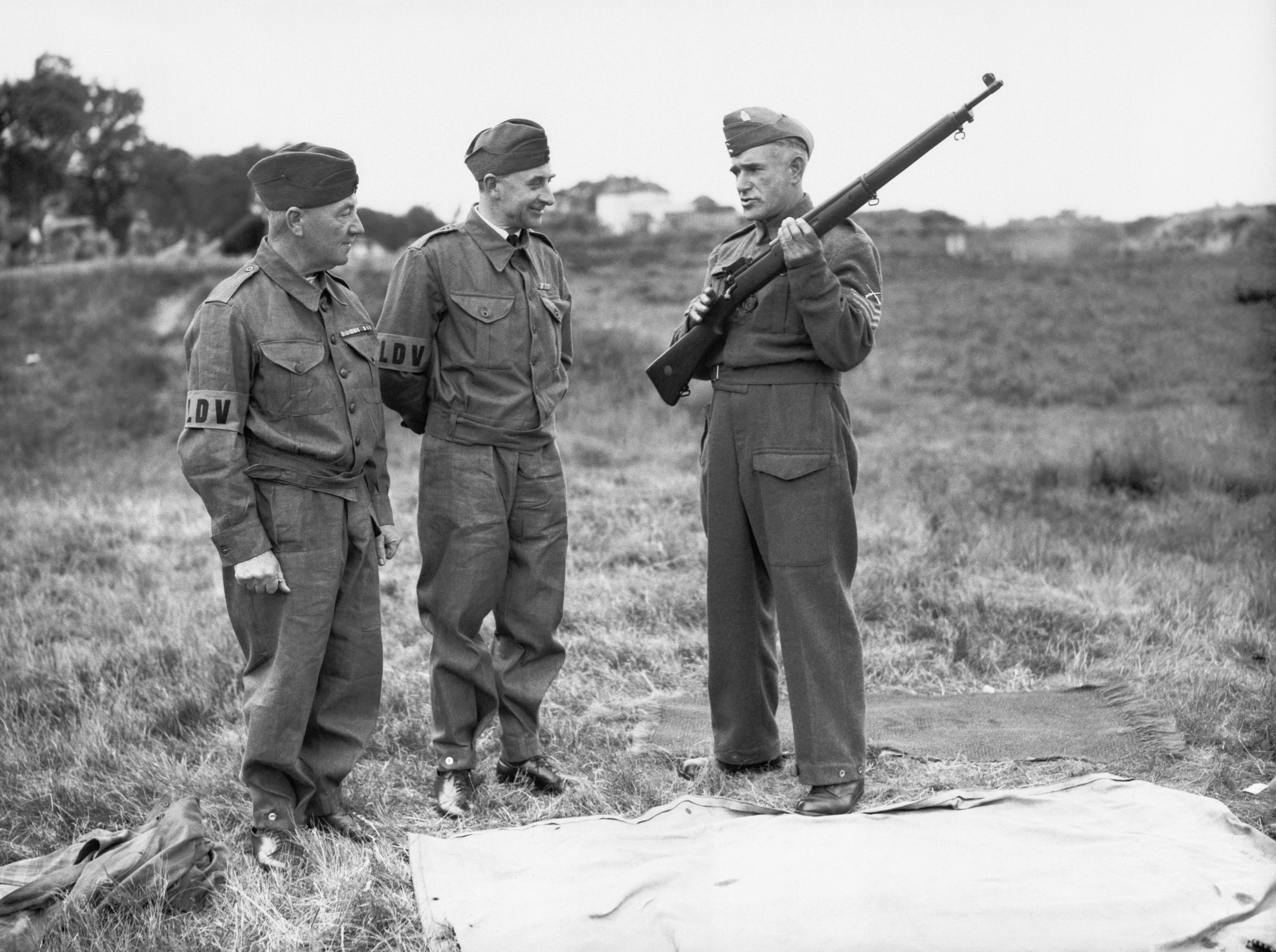
Local Defence Volunteers receiving rifle instruction. Two on left wear Overalls, Denim; the sergeant instructor wears standard battledress.

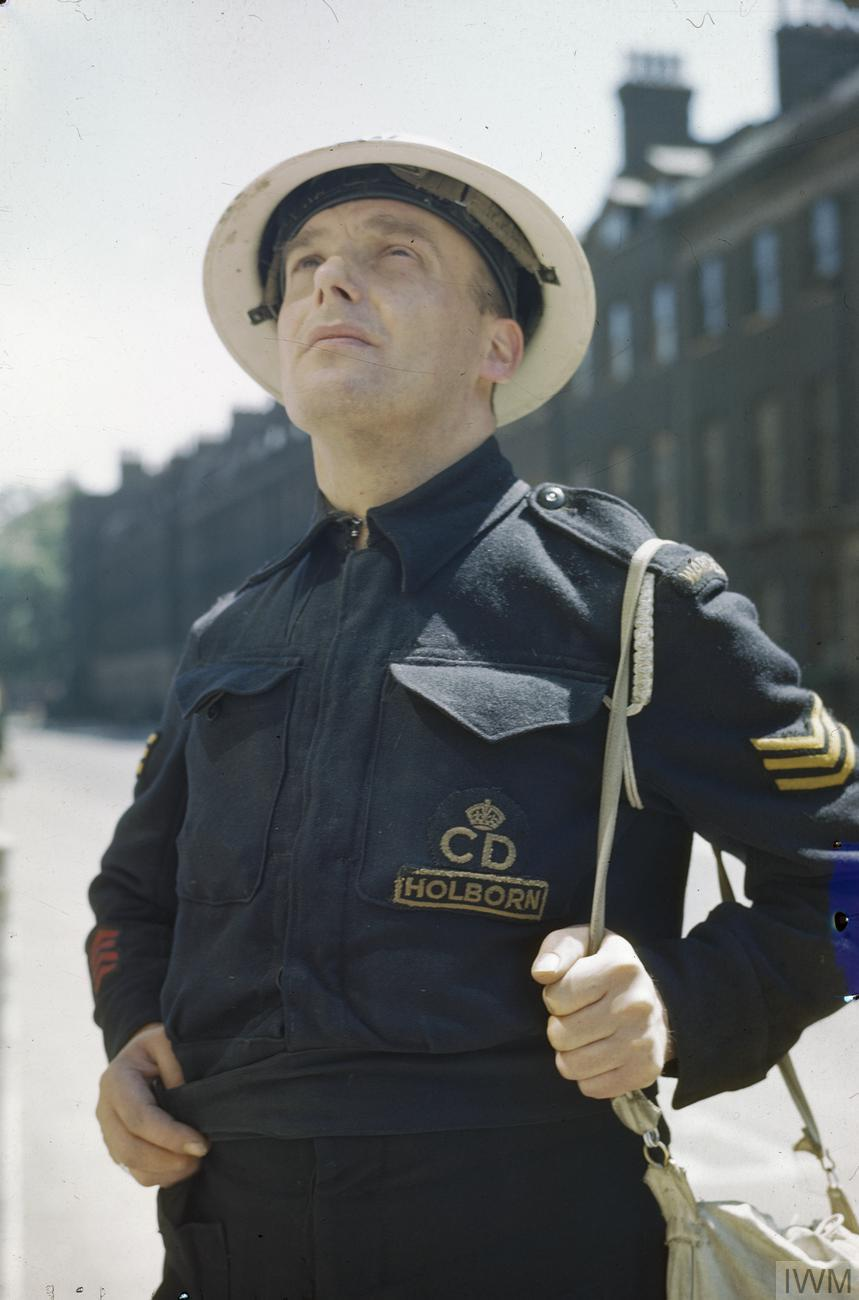
An ARP Warden for the London neighbourhood of Holborn surveys bomb damage in dark blue battledress.

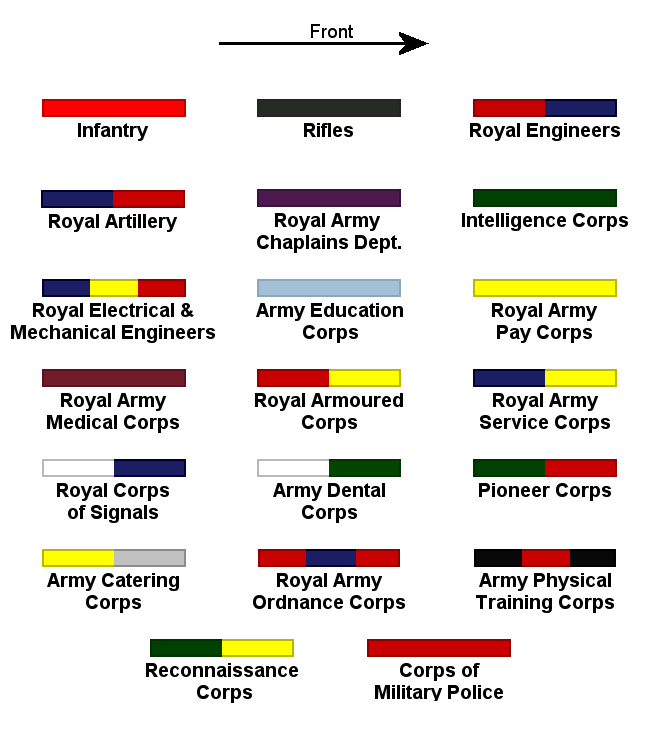
Coloured arm of service stripes as worn on the upper sleeves of the battledress blouse.

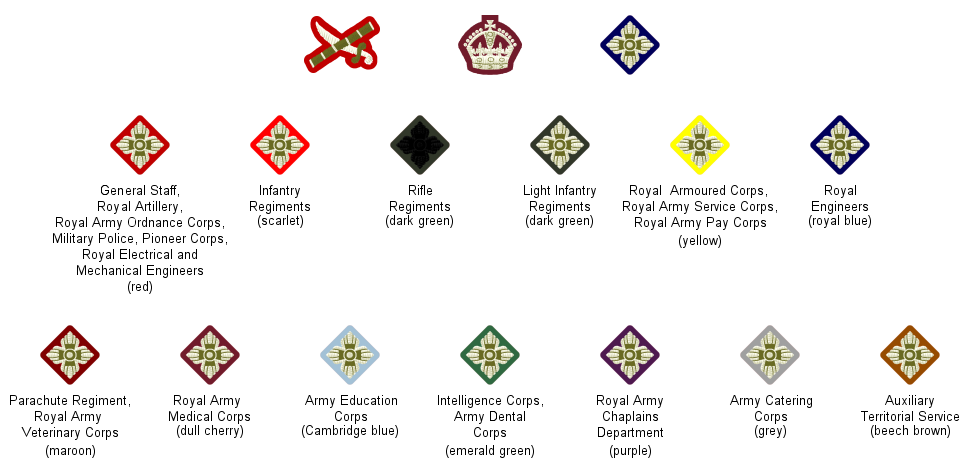
Colour scheme for backing of officers' rank badges as worn on British battledress in World War 2.

Battledress trousers known as Trousers, Parachutist were issued to some parachute troops, though the majority still wore standard Battledress around the time of the Normandy landings. Supply increased as the war progressed but even by May 1945, standard Battledress trousers were still common in Airborne divisions. Trousers, Parachutist had two pleated pockets in the rear for shell dressings, an enlarged map pocket lined with chamois leather and an integral pocket for the F.S. knife in the seam of the right leg. They were for 'combat' use only and as such, were not used for parades or going on leave.

Battledress in shades of RAF blue and navy blue were also produced for the Royal Air Force and Royal Auxiliary Air Force (and Commonwealth flying services) and Royal Navy, Royal Navy Reserve, and Royal Navy Volunteer Reserve (and Commonwealth naval services). During the Second World War, Britain's Civil Defence Service (for example, ARP wardens, rescue and ambulance crews) were issued dark blue battledress, and this battledress scheme continued with the Civil Defence Corps set up in 1949.

German U-Boat crews were also commonly issued with British Army Denim battledress (with German insignia added). Large stockpiles had been captured by the Germans after the fall of France in 1940.

== Post war ==
After the Second World War, individual Commonwealth nations developed their Battledress uniform into both a parade and a field uniform. In Britain, Battledress of all types, but mostly unissued surplus suits of 1949 Pattern BD, were utilised as prisoners' uniforms in HM Prisons from the mid-1960s onwards as the armed forces made the large-scale switch to the more modern cotton/sateen Combat Dress.

- British Pattern 1949: Several changes to Battledress were adopted by the British Army after the Second World War, with broad lapels added to the Battle Dress Blouse, giving it an open-collar design similar to Canadian 1949 Pattern. Other ranks, as well as officers, now wore it with a collared shirt and tie (although the RAF always had done). The map pocket on the trousers was moved completely to the side. Buttons on the pockets remained exposed, though a fly front was restored to 1949 Pattern BD. In the Korean War, Battledress was found to be inadequate for the severe weather experienced by British troops, resulting in the Pattern 1950 Combat Dress, the design of which was influenced by the U.S. Army M1943 uniform. Introduced during the winter of 1951–1952, this uniform was only issued for winter use to front line troops, such as those serving with the British Army on the Rhine. With the ending of National Service in the United Kingdom, a lighter version, the 1960 Combat Dress, became general issue for everyday wear. The No 2 Service Dress eventually replaced the Battledress for formal use by the early 1960s.
- Canadian Pattern 1949: Canada only produced one more version of Battledress after the war; Pattern 1949 had broad lapels added to the Battledress Blouse, giving it an open-collar design. The First Field Dressing was also removed from the trousers after the war. Battledress continued to be worn as a field uniform during the Korean War and up to the introduction of the Combat Uniform. It was retained for dress wear up until Unification of the Armed Forces in 1968, and into the 1970s by some Reserve units. Cadets at the Royal Military College of Canada continued to wear a Navy-blue variant of the Battle Dress Blouse until May 2006.

== Legacy ==
Battle Dress inspired the military combat uniforms of other nations. The Battle Dress blouse was a direct influence on the M1944 "Eisenhower" jacket. A similar pattern was produced in Australia for US personnel in the Far East and was called a ""Vandegrift" Jacket by US Marines. Germany's copy, the Felduniform 44, only reached front line troops by the end of the war. France made copies (the Modèle 1945, 1946 and 1949 patterns) to replace worn out British items.

== Sizes ==
Blouse sizes

Size	Waist	Breast	Height
No. 1	32"-33"	32"-33"	5'3"-5'4"
No. 2	30"-31"	29"-30"	5'3"-5'4"
No. 3	31"-32"	33"-36"	5'3"-5'4"
No. 4	30"-31"	33"-36"	5'5"-5'6"
No. 5	31"-32"	36"-37"	5'5"-5'6"
No. 6	34"-35"	38"-39"	5'7"-5'8"
No. 7	32"-34"	35"-36"	5'7"-5'8"
No. 8	35"-36"	37"-38"	5'7"-5'8"
No. 9	37"-38"	39"-40"	5'7"-5'8"
No. 10	31"-32"	36"-37"	5'9-5'10"
No. 11	33"-34"	38"-39"	5'9"-5'10"
No. 12	35"-36"	40"-41"	5'9"-5'10"
No. 13	33"-34"	38"-39"	5'11"-6'0"
No. 14	35"-36"	39"-40"	5'11"-6'0"
No. 15	37"-38"	42"-43"	5'11"-6'0"
No. 16	34"-35"	39"-40"	6'0"-6'2"
No. 17	37"-38"	43"-44"	6'0"-6'2"
No. 18	38"-39"	42"-43"	6'0"-6'2"
No. 19	35"-36"	40"-41"	5'5"-5'6"

Trouser sizes

Size	Waist	Inseam	Height
No. 1	32"-33"	28"	5'3"-5'4"
No. 2	30"-31"	28"	5'3"-5'4"
No. 3	31"-32"	30"	5'3"-5'4"
No. 4	30"-31"	30"	5'5"-5'6"
No. 5	31"-32"	30"	5'5"-5'6"
No. 6	34"-35"	30"	5'7"-5'8"
No. 7	32"-34"	30"	5'7"-5'8"
No. 8	35"-36"	30"	5'7"-5'8"
No. 9	37"-38"	30"	5'7"-5'8"
No. 10	31"-32"	32"	5'9"-5'10"
No. 11	33"-34"	32"	5'9"-5'10"
No. 12	35"-36"	32"	5'9"-5'10"
No. 13	33"-34"	32"	5'11"-6'0"
No. 14	35"-36"	32"	5'11"-6'0"
No. 15	37"-38"	32"	5'11"-6'0"
No. 16	34"-35"	34"	6'0"-6'2"
No. 17	37"-38"	34"	6'0"-6'2"
No. 18	38"-39"	34"	6'0"-6'2"
No. 19	35"-36"	30"	5'5"-5'6"

== See also ==
- Battle dress (disambiguation)
- Uniforms of the British Army
- Service Dress (British Army)
- Combat uniform
- Battle Dress Uniform, of the U.S.
- Military uniform
