= Service Dress (British Army) =

Uniform of the British Army

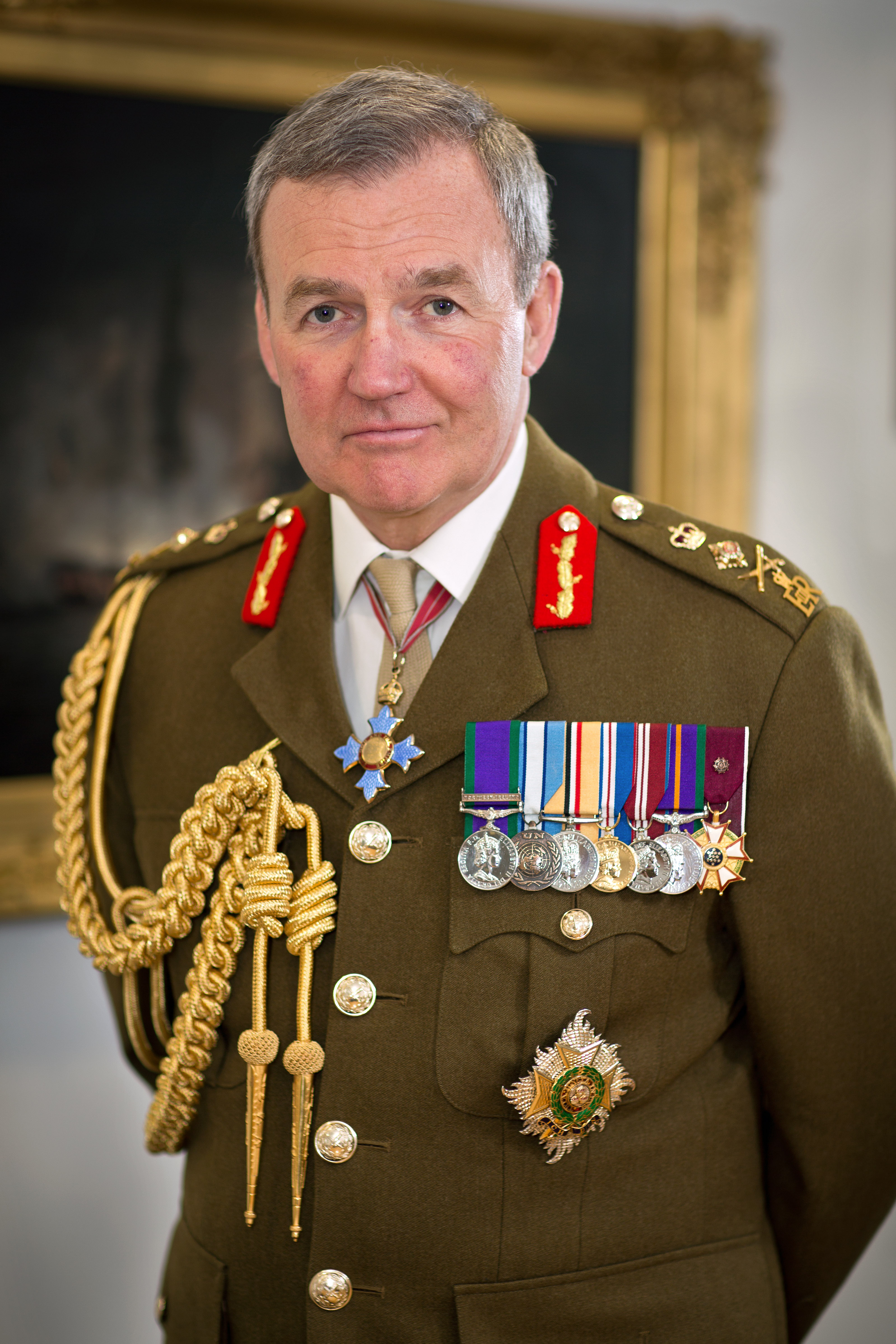
Service dress (General The Lord Houghton of Richmond)

Service Dress is the style of khaki service dress uniform introduced by the British Army for use in the field from the early 1900s, following the experiences of a number of imperial wars and conflicts, including the Second Boer War. This variant of uniform continues to be worn today, although only in a formal role, as No. 2 Pattern dress.

== Khaki ==
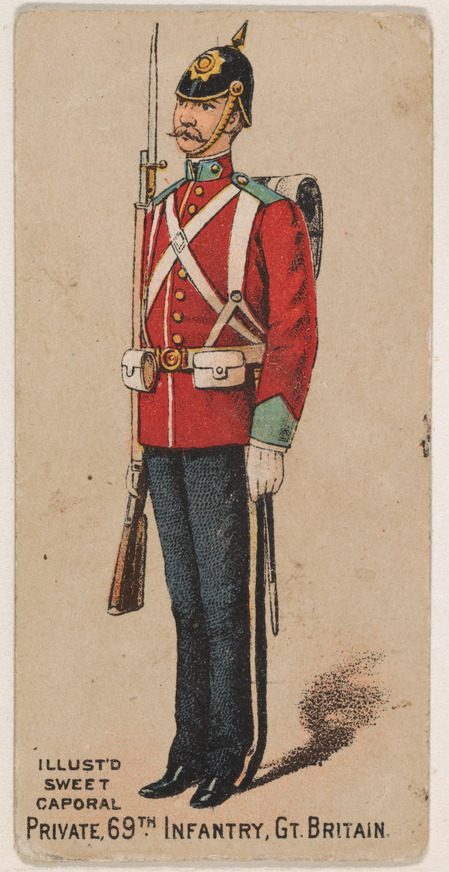
A private of the 69th Regiment of Foot in about 1880, wearing the home service uniform worn until 1902.

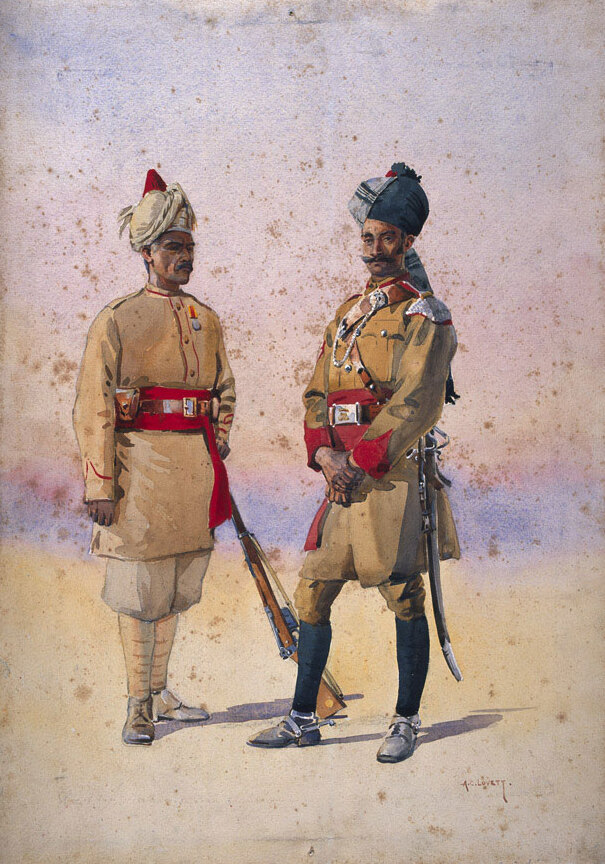
The Corps of Guides in early khaki uniforms

During the latter half of the nineteenth century, the bright red tunics worn by British infantry regiments had proved to be a liability, especially when during the First Boer War they had been faced by enemies armed with rifles firing the new smokeless cartridges. This had been exacerbated by the white cross-belts and ammunition pouches worn by the line infantry

The term Khaki (Persian for dusty) had come from India and was used to describe the 'Drab' uniform first worn in 1848 by the Corps of Guides. During the Indian Mutiny of 1857 many British regiments took to staining their white tropical uniforms with tea leaves or other makeshift dyes in order to camouflage them. Rifle regiments had long used dark green uniforms (with blackened badges, buttons, and carrying equipment) as camouflage and some units of the Volunteer Force London Regiment had adopted Hodden grey uniforms for the same purpose. Numerous khaki drill uniforms were adopted by units in the field over the turn of the century but the darker khaki standardised Service Dress uniform was not adopted until after the Second Boer War. First publicly displayed in 1902, the new uniform did not become universal issue until the following year for all of the regular army serving in Britain.

Scarlet, dark blue and rifle green uniforms were retained as "review order" (parade) and "walking out" (off duty wear out of barracks) until 1914. After World War I they were reintroduced only for the Brigade of Guards, Household Cavalry, regimental bands and for other limited purposes such as wear by officers attending levees.

== Service Dress ==
=== Other Ranks ===
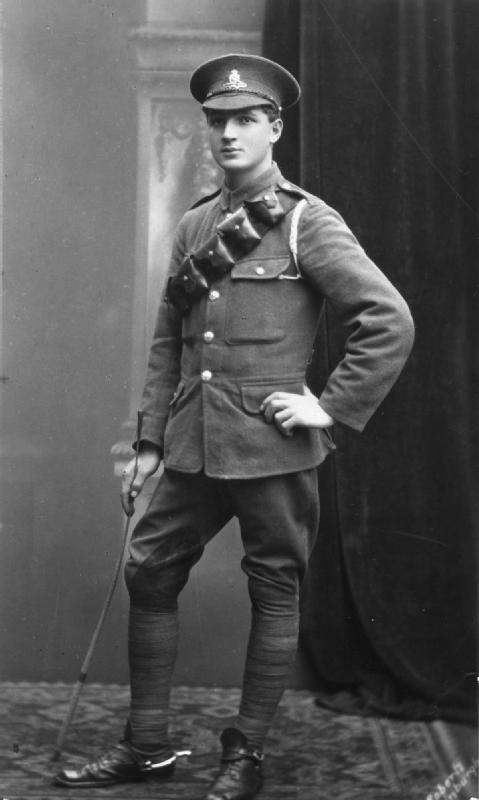
A gunner of the Royal Garrison Artillery in 1916 or 1917, wearing the 1903 Bandolier Equipment.

For Other Ranks, the SD uniform originally comprised khaki wool (serge) trousers, a khaki wool tunic, with stand-and-fall (or Prussian) collar, four pockets on the front, each buttoned closed by a flap with a straight (horizontal) edge, large, serge reinforcement patches over each shoulder, shoulder straps and a pair of brass wire hangers on the back, over the kidneys, to support the belt. The front of the jacket was closed by five buttons, usually of a regimental pattern, brass for most regiments and corps, but black for rifle regiments, arranged vertically. A peaked cap was provided, covered in the same khaki serge (including the stiff peak), with a leather chin strap (brown, for most regiments) held at either side by brass or horn buttons. This uniform was worn with ankle Ammunition boots; in the field, Puttees would be wound up (or down) the length of the shins, covering the top of the boots. The carrying equipment worn by infantry with this uniform was normally the 1908 Pattern Webbing, made of fabric and also khaki (though a lighter shade than the uniform).

Cavalry and gunners of the Royal Regiment of Artillery did not wear webbing equipment, but instead used the leather 1903 Bandolier Equipment, worn over one shoulder. Originally derived from the bandoliers carried by the Boer commandos during the Second Boer War, it had been found to be unsuitable for infantry use but remained in service with mounted troops. Headgear was initially a forage cap without a peak, similar to those worn by the German Army; it was known as the "Brodrick cap", named after St John Brodrick, the Secretary of State for War. This proved to be unpopular and was replaced in 1905 by the now familiar peaked cap; however, the Brodrick cap was retained by the Royal Marines until 1930. In late 1914, the Winter Service Dress Cap was introduced; it had a soft peak and crown with woollen ear flaps that could be buttoned together over the top. It was commonly known as the "Gorblimey" cap, allegedly from the expletive uttered by sergeant majors when they first saw them. They were not much used after mid-1916.

=== Officers ===
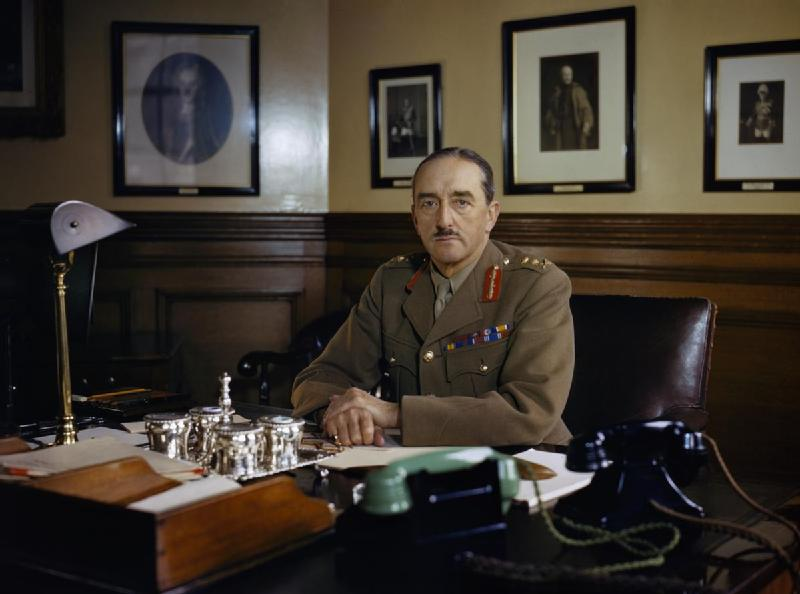
General Sir Alan Brooke, 1942.

The Officers' Service Dress was completely different, except in colour. The cloth used was tailored and of more expensive wool, and the tunic had longer skirts. After 1908 the turn-down collar was replaced by open stepped lapels. This created a jacket, similar to a civilian lounge suit, rather than a tunic, and revealed a shirt collar and tie; the shirt was initially white and the tie black; but from 1913 these were both replaced with khaki. The breast pockets were pleated and closed by scalloped flaps, while those at the hips had straight edges. There was a shoulder strap on each shoulder but rank was originally displayed on the cuffs, which were scalloped at the closure and edged with herring-bone pattern khaki tape. Trousers, or riding breeches, and brown leather Riding boots were worn (even in infantry regiments, as officers traditionally rode on campaign). The carrying equipment was the leather Sam Browne pattern, brown for most regiments, black for Rifle Regiments. Officers also wore a khaki peaked cap with a cloth visor that was similar to the men's, but made of superior materials and of better quality. Unlike other ranks, officers were expected to pay for their own uniforms, pistol, sword and Sam Browne belt.

=== Scottish Variations ===
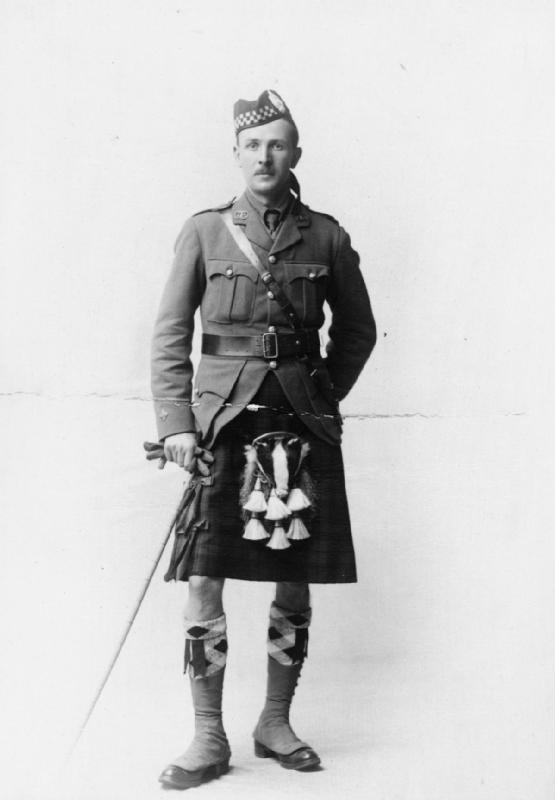
A lieutenant of the Argyll and Sutherland Highlanders

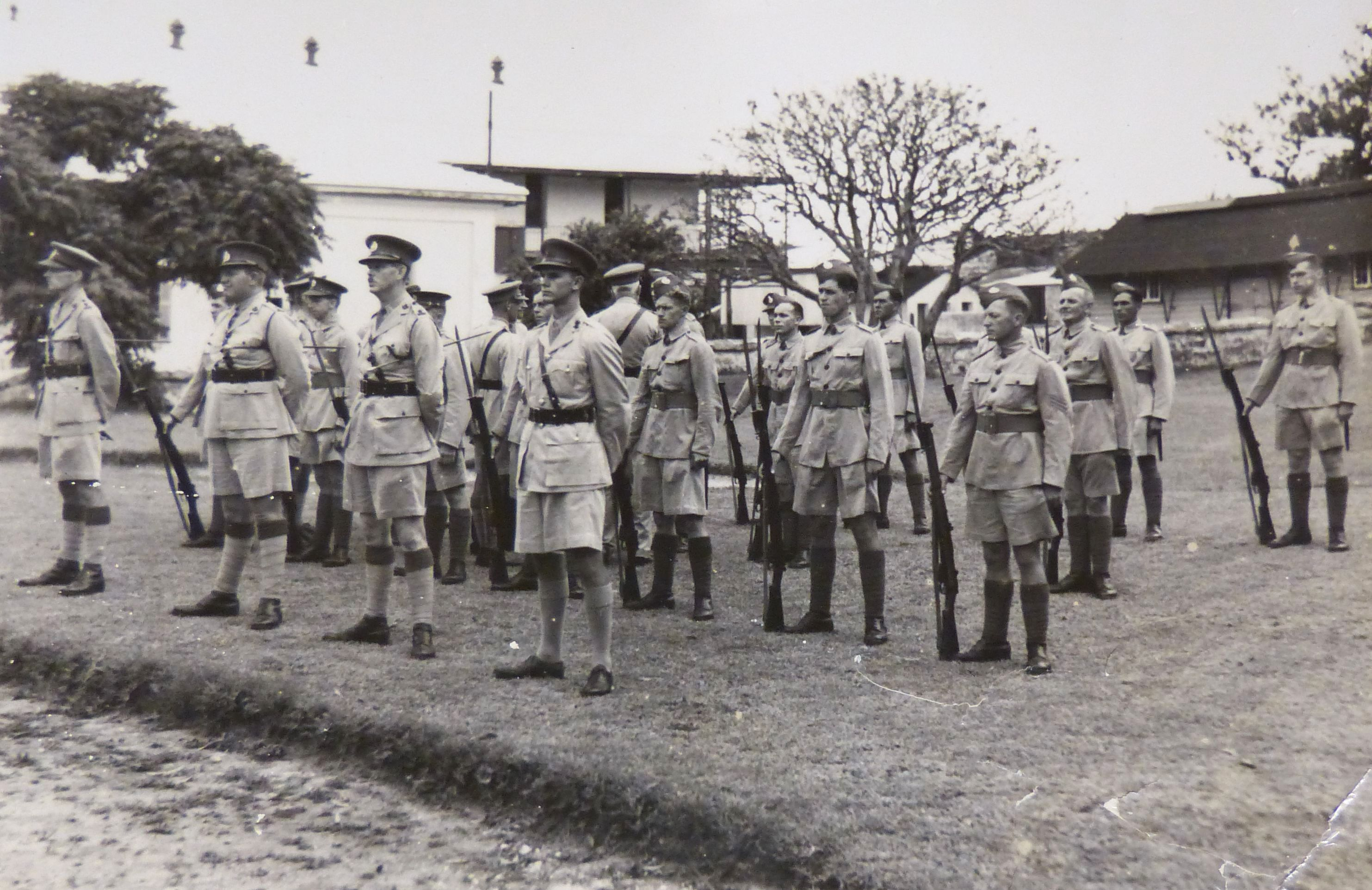
22 June 1940 Prospect Camp inspection by Lieutenant-General Sir Denis Bernard of 1st Bermuda Volunteer Rifle Corps Contingent to the Lincolnshire Regiment showing officers' and Other Ranks tropical Service Dress with short trousers

Scottish Highland pattern uniforms differed in the wearing of tartan kilts or trews, rather than trousers or breeches and in alterations in the design of the tunic and jacket to make them resemble the traditional Highland doublet type – notably in cutting away the skirts at the front of the tunic to allow the wearing of a sporran. Most Scottish regiments did not wear the service dress peaked cap but either the Glengarry or Tam O'Shanter.

=== Tropical variation ===
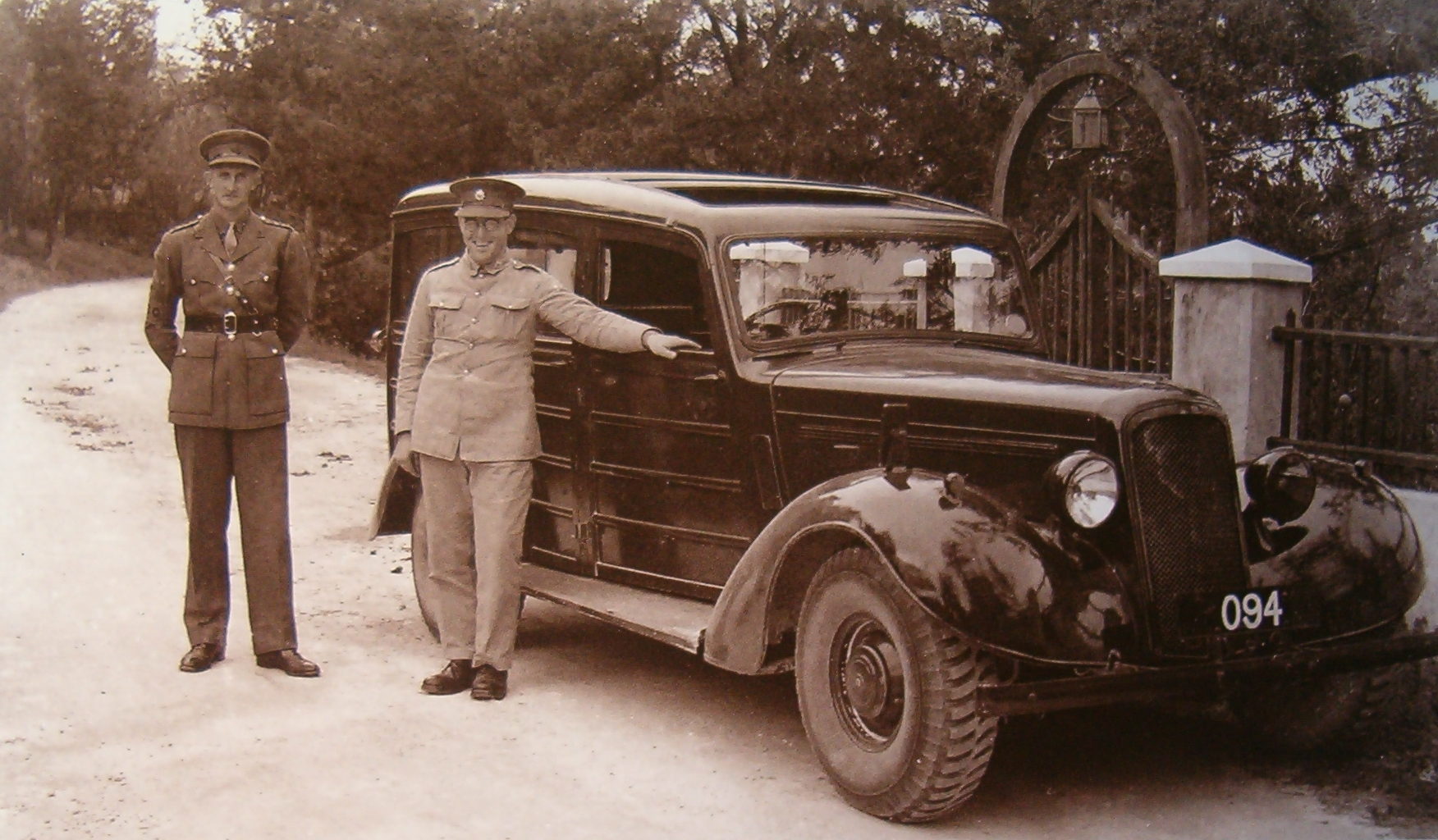
An officer (probably Bermuda Command GSO3, Captain (temp.) R. H. Tierney, RA) in the temperate Service Dress and RASC driver in the other ranks tropical Service Dress in Bermuda, in 1942.

There were also lightweight uniforms for wear in warmer climates, known as Khaki Drill (KD). The Officers' was little different in cut, but the Other Ranks tunic was distinguished from the temperate service dress by having only the breast pockets. Both were made from a lighter cloth (both in weight, and in shade). Trousers were often replaced by Bermuda shorts. The same cap was generally worn, however, if worn at all – pith helmets, covered in khaki cloth, continued to be the norm in warm climates up to the Second World War. Only officers are issued this dress today, on posting to tropical areas, as No.4 Dress.

=== Royal Air Force ===
The khaki Service Dress tunic adopted for the Royal Flying Corps (RFC) in 1912 had a wide cloth panel (a plastron) across the chest with concealed buttons, since it was thought that the usual button arrangement would be liable to catch on the bracing wires used on aircraft at that time. This tunic was popularly known as the "maternity jacket". The Naval Wing of the RFC, later the Royal Naval Air Service (RNAS), wore naval uniform. On 1 April 1918, the RFC and RNAS merged to form the Royal Air Force (RAF). Initially, the uniforms of the former services continued in use, but on 1 May, an "interim" RAF uniform was approved which was basically the standard khaki Army Service Dress. A light blue version of Service Dress was approved for daily wear on 10 July, but this proved highly unpopular and many persisted with their old outfits. Finally, on 1 October 1919, the RAF Service Dress of a blue-grey colour, known as Air Force blue, was introduced.

== The Great War ==
This was the standard combat uniform of the British Army at the start of the Great War and remained little changed throughout. The radical appearance of the Service Dress is demonstrated by accounts of German troops, who on first seeing British soldiers, thought that their clothing was more like a civilian golf outfit than a military uniform. With the numbers of uniforms produced, minor variations appeared, especially in the private soldiers' hat and the shape of the tunic collar. A soft version of the peaked OR cap was introduced, nicknamed the Gor Blimey. This was an attempt at conservation but had the advantage of being able to be stuffed into a pocket or even pressed underneath the new steel Brodie helmet, which came into service in 1916 as the realities of trench warfare and its attendant artillery bombardment, set in.

Although this was the standard combat uniform for the British Army and colonial units (at least when serving in temperate climates), the armies of the Commonwealth countries (which originally referred to those with Dominion status) had variations on the theme. The Canadian tunic was closed by seven buttons and had a conventional tunic collar (all stand and no fall), although the Canadian Officer's Service Dress was the same as that in the British Army. The Australian version of service dress, brought into use in 1912 and called the Commonwealth Pattern differed significantly. It was a lighter pea-green colour, had a voluminous pleat in the back, sewn-on waist belt, four large front pockets and triangular shaped upper pocket flaps.

Officers' SD uniforms were modified during the War chiefly in that plain cuffs were introduced, with the rank insignia moved to the shoulder straps. The reason for this was that the old cuffs had made it too easy for enemy snipers to distinguish officers from men. Scottish Highland regiments replaced the sporran during the war, with a khaki cloth apron with a large, buttoned pocket where the sporran would sit.

=== Kitchener's Blues ===
At the outbreak of war in 1914, the huge number of volunteers answering the appeal of Secretary of State for War, Lord Kitchener, were formed into a New Army. The problem of providing uniforms for these recruits was acute and many trained in their civilian clothes for weeks, while others were temporarily issued with peacetime scarlet from store. Finally, a highly simplified version of Service Dress was produced for them, without breast pockets, shoulder straps and other refinements. They were dark blue in colour, because the original khaki dye had been produced in Germany before the war and it had proved difficult to acquire sufficient from alternative sources. This colour gave rise to the popular name for the uniform; "Kitchener's Blues". Around 500,000 sets of these uniforms were produced and worn during basic training. Rumours that the first issue of Blues were actually postmen's uniforms are unlikely to be correct as the tunics issued by the General Post Office were of a different cut and were edged with red piping; however, some sources state that a large quantity of blue uniform cloth was acquired from Post Office stocks for this purpose.

=== Great War gallery ===
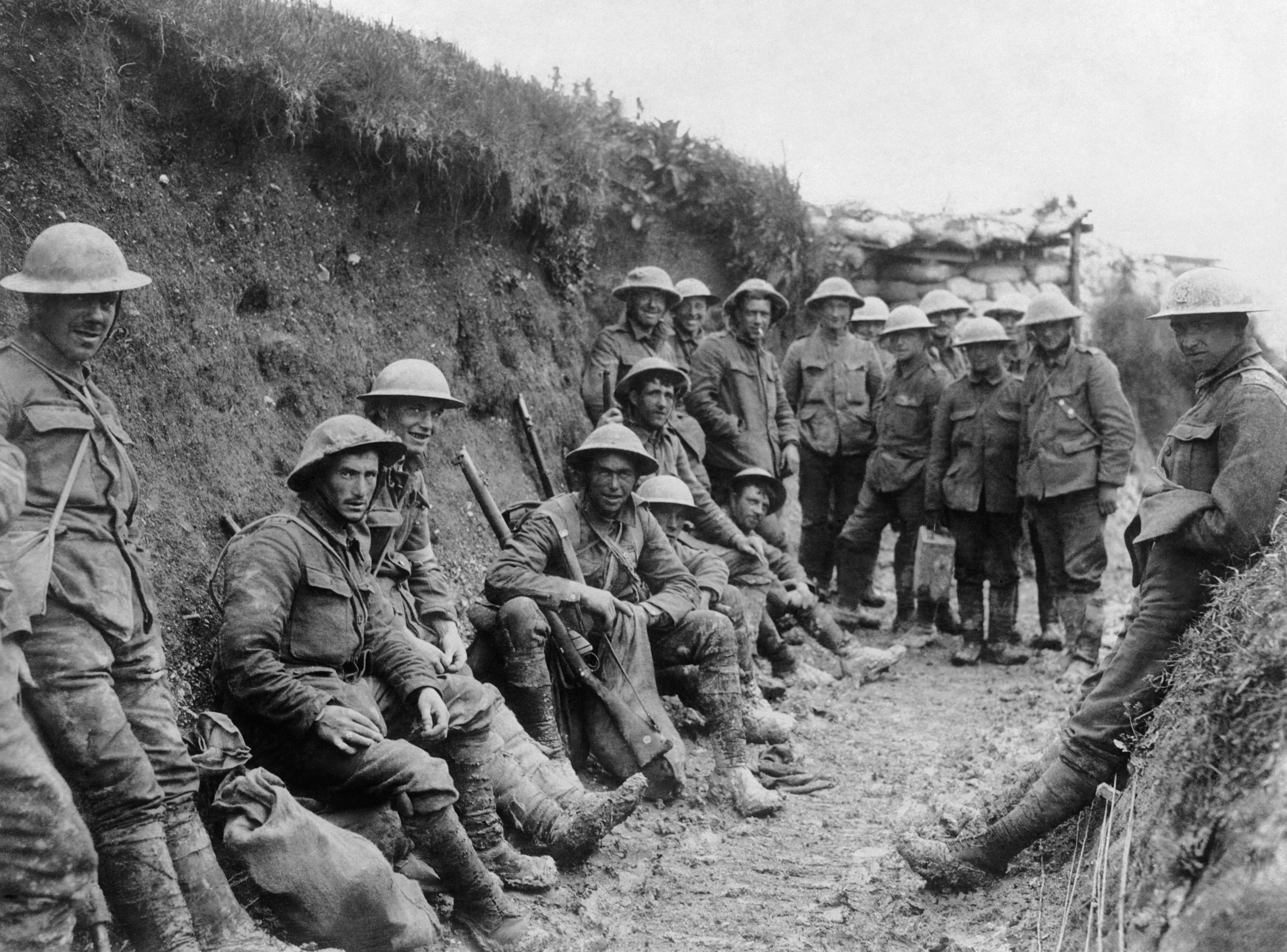
Irish soldiers in Service Dress uniforms wait in a trench at the Somme, on the Western Front.

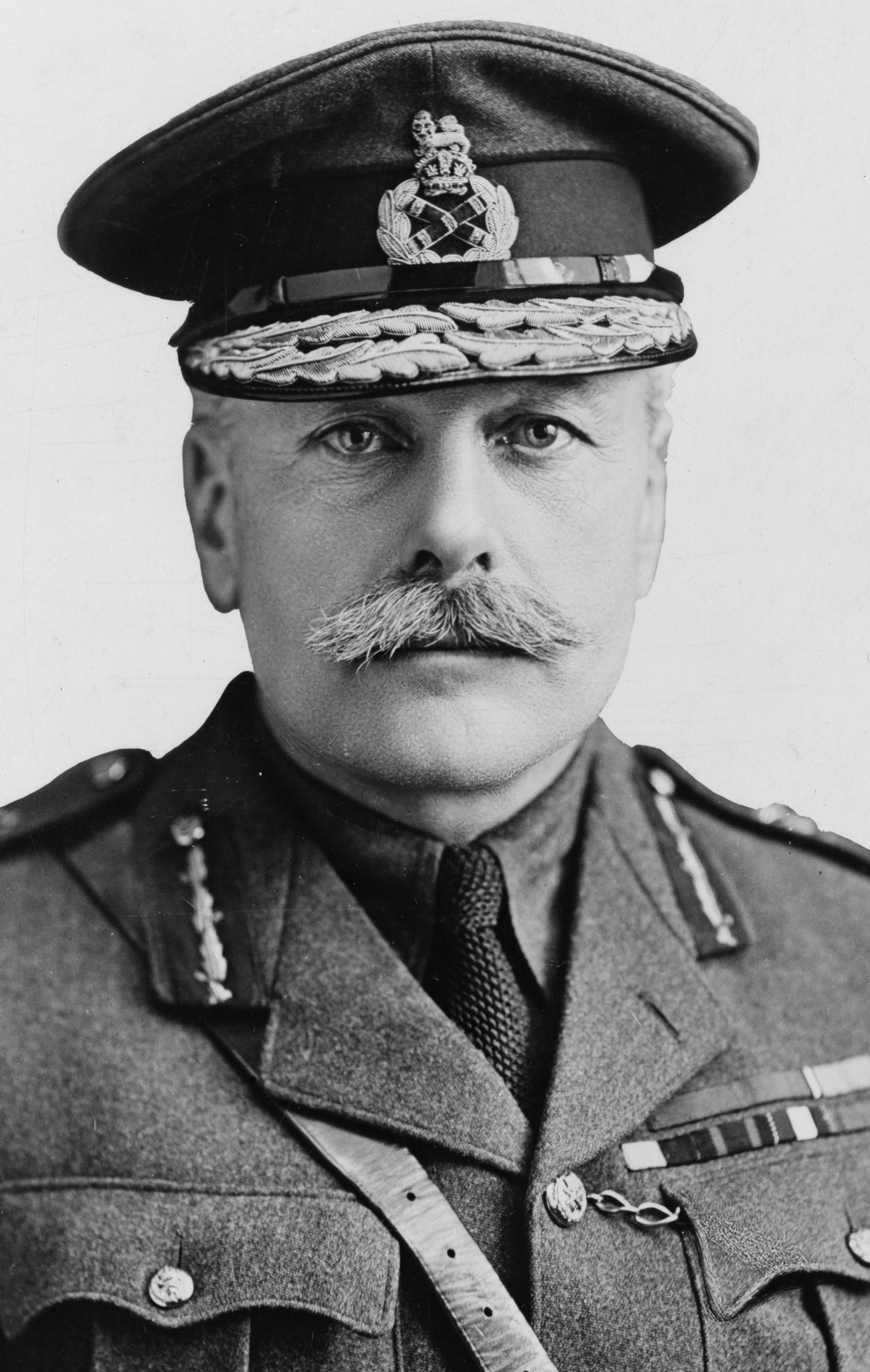
Field Marshal Haig, in Service Dress

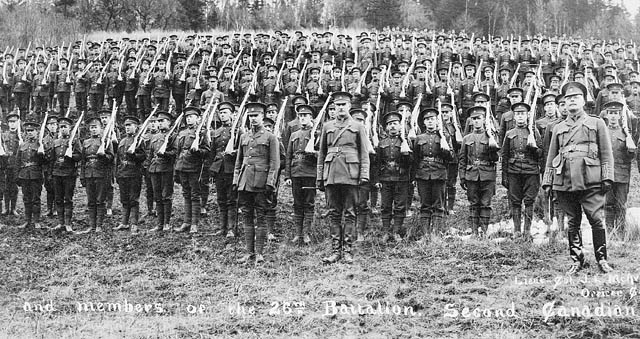
26th Battalion of the Second Canadian Expeditionary Force, 1915. The Canadian OR tunic had a vertical collar and six buttons.

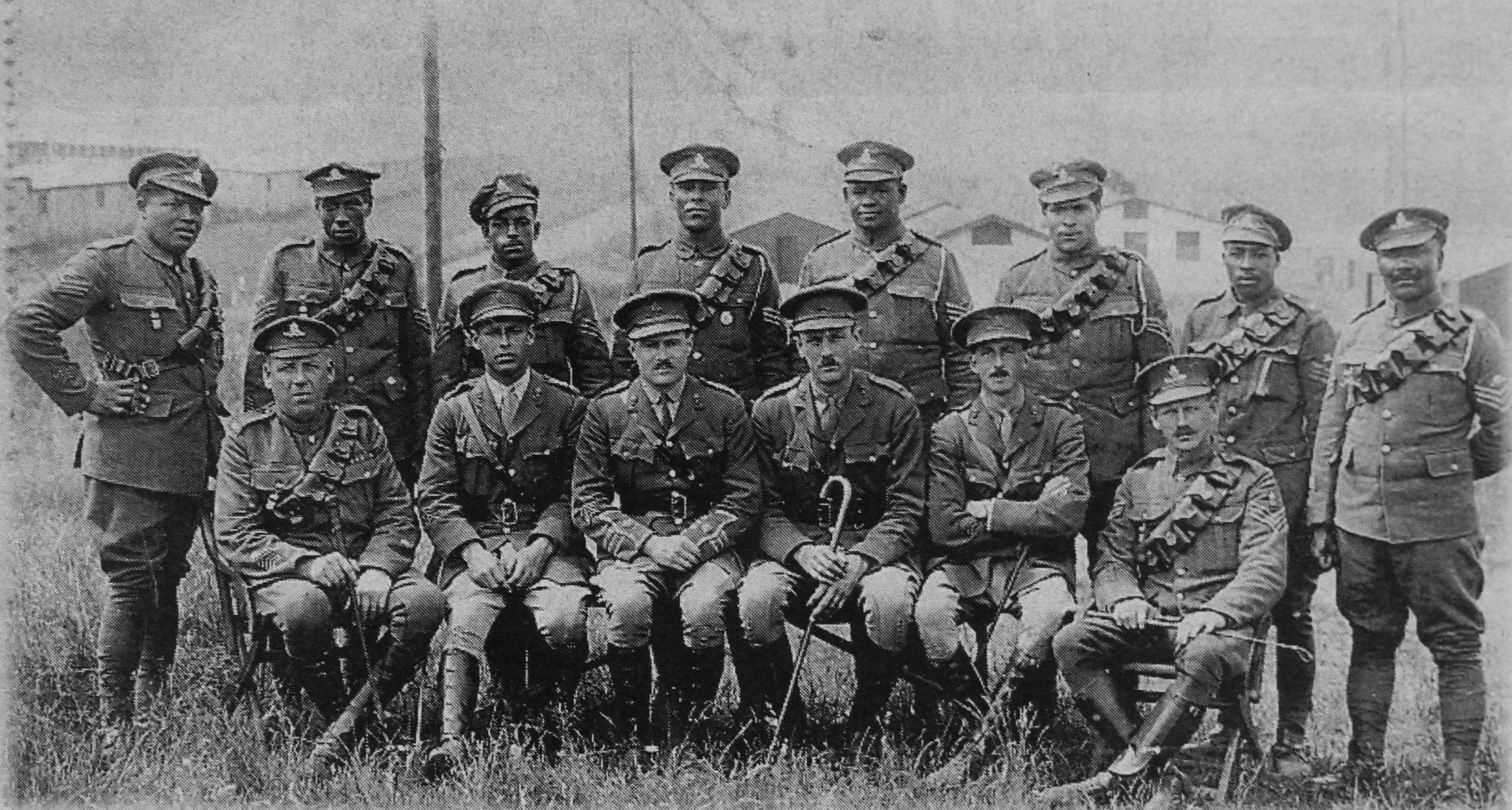
Bermudian officers and senior ranks of the Royal Garrison Artillery. Like the cavalry, Gunners did not wear 1908 Web Equipment, but retained the 1903 Bandolier Equipment.

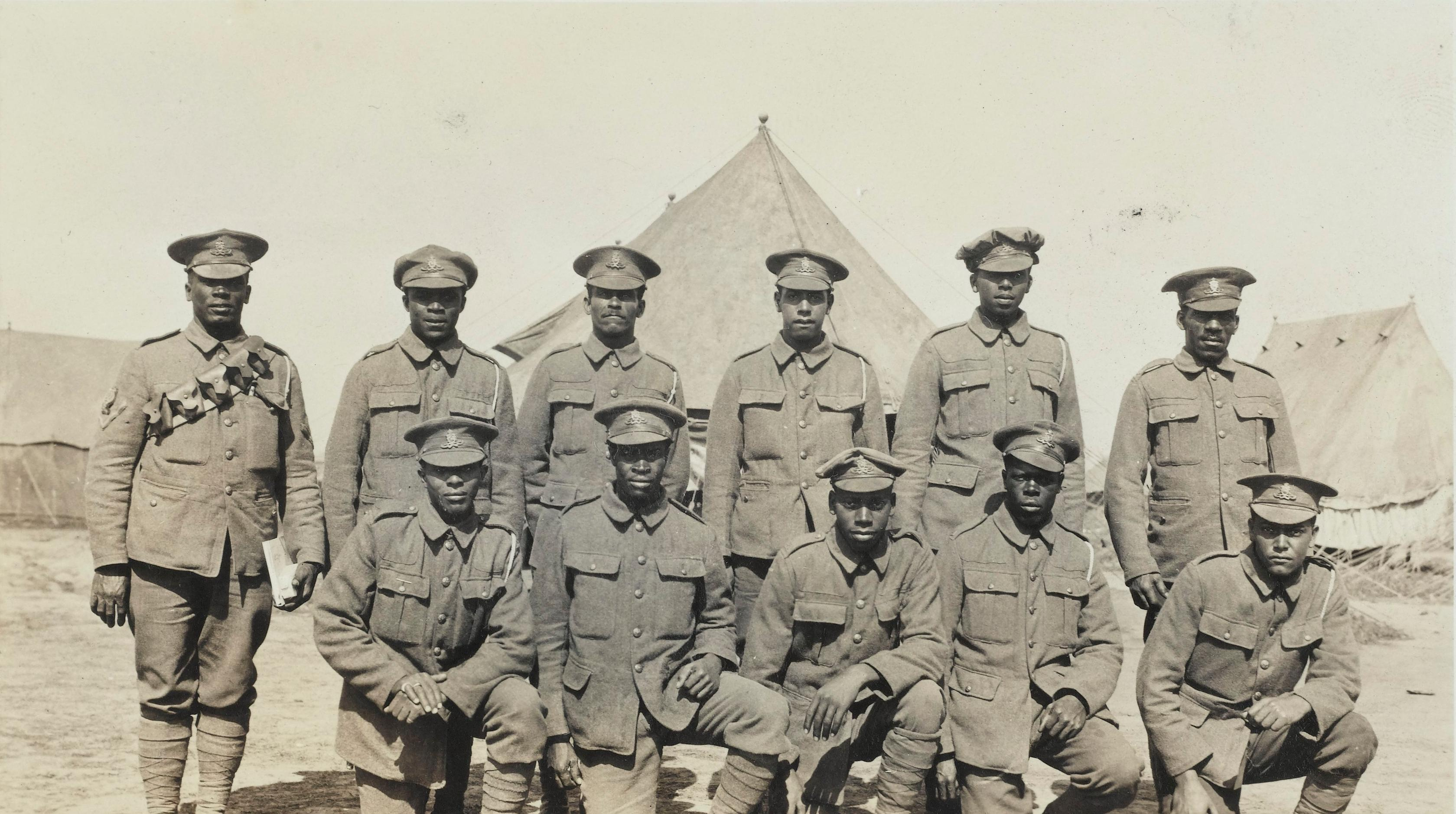
Soldiers of the Bermuda Contingent of the Royal Garrison Artillery (Bermuda Militia Artillery) in a Casualty Clearing Station in July 1916

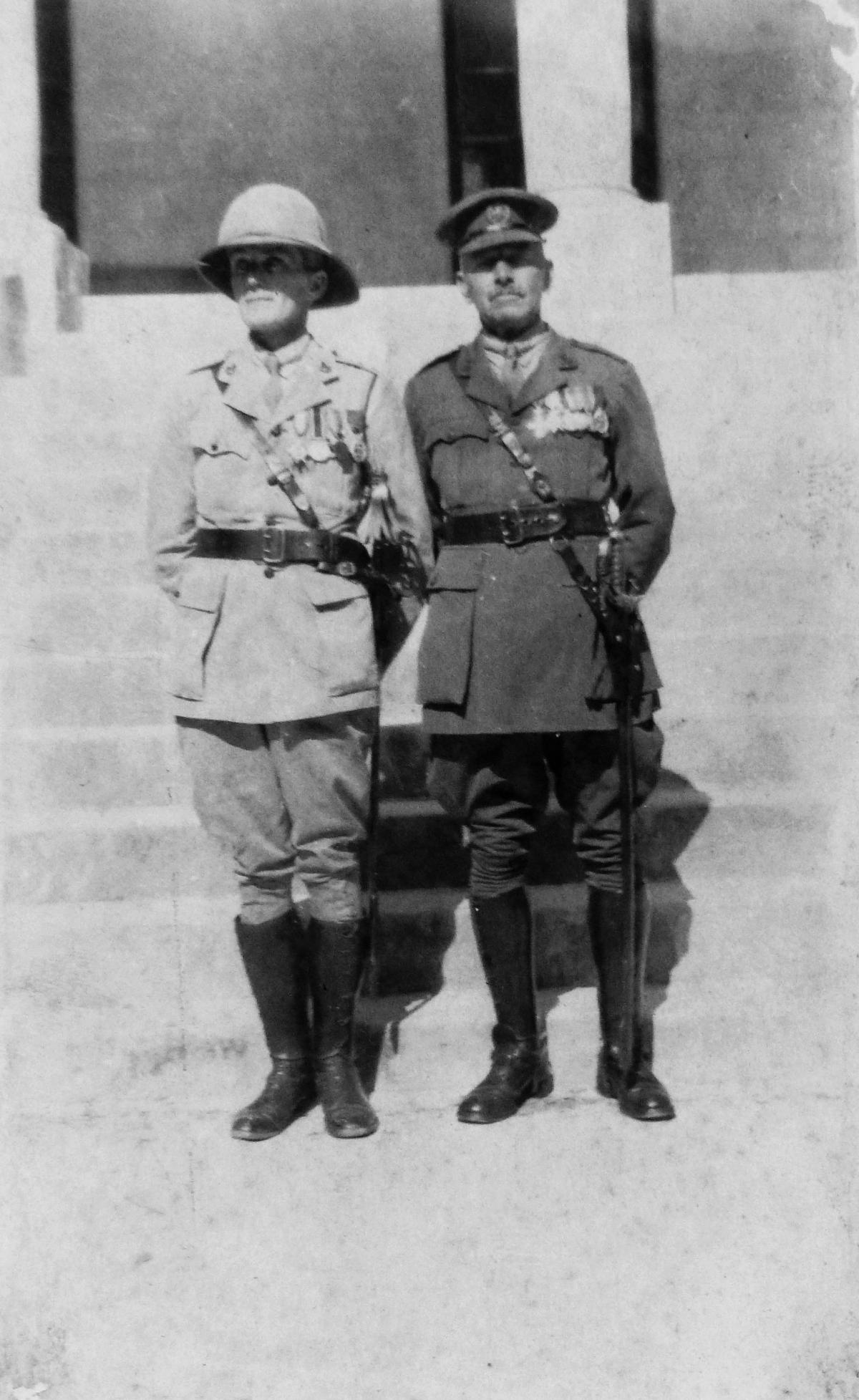
Major RC Earl & Lieutenant-Colonel RJ Tucker Bermuda Volunteer Rifle Corps, on Armistice Day, 1930, in warm weather and temperate officers' Service Dress

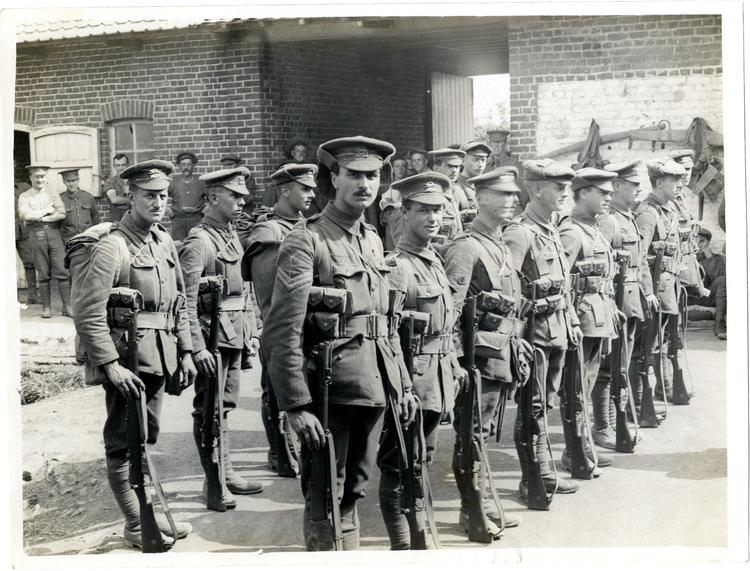
Soldiers of the Leicestershire Regiment in France in 1915, with their 1908 Web Equipment in Full Marching Order

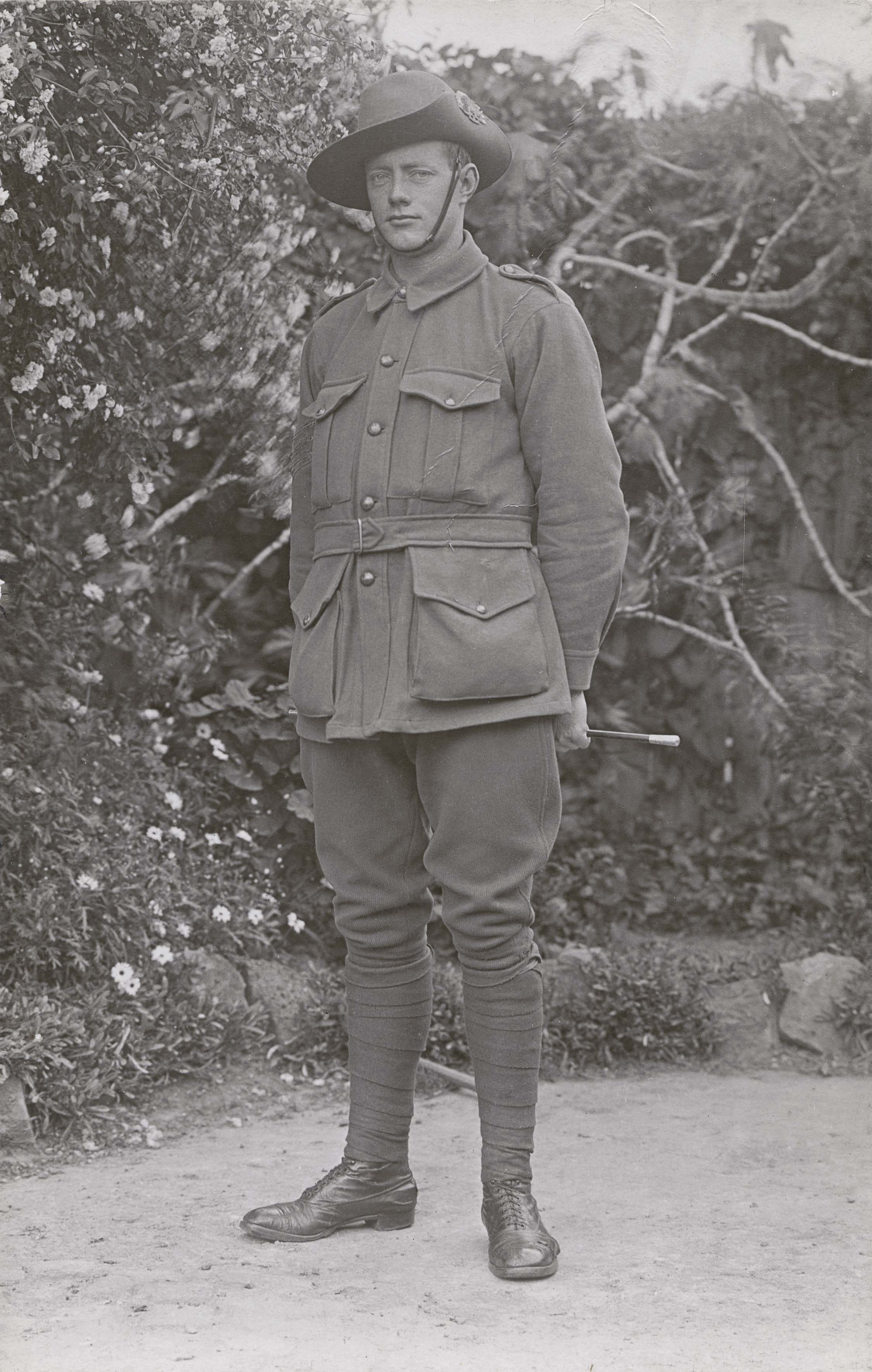
An Australian recruit wearing the Commonwealth Pattern Service Dress in 1915

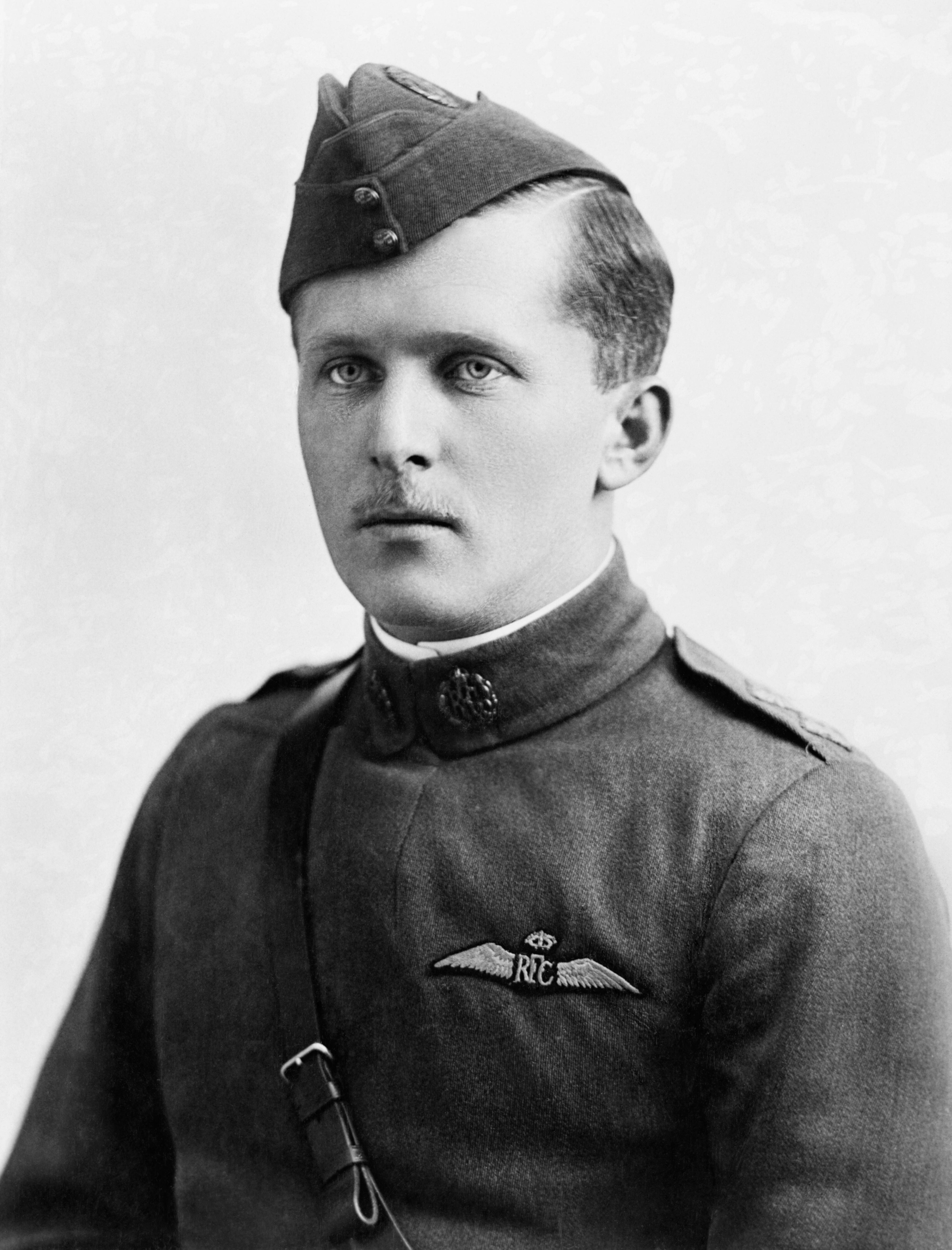
Canadian pilot Billy Bishop VC wearing the tunic adopted by the Royal Flying Corps in 1912. It had concealed buttons and was known as the "maternity jacket".

== The Second World War ==
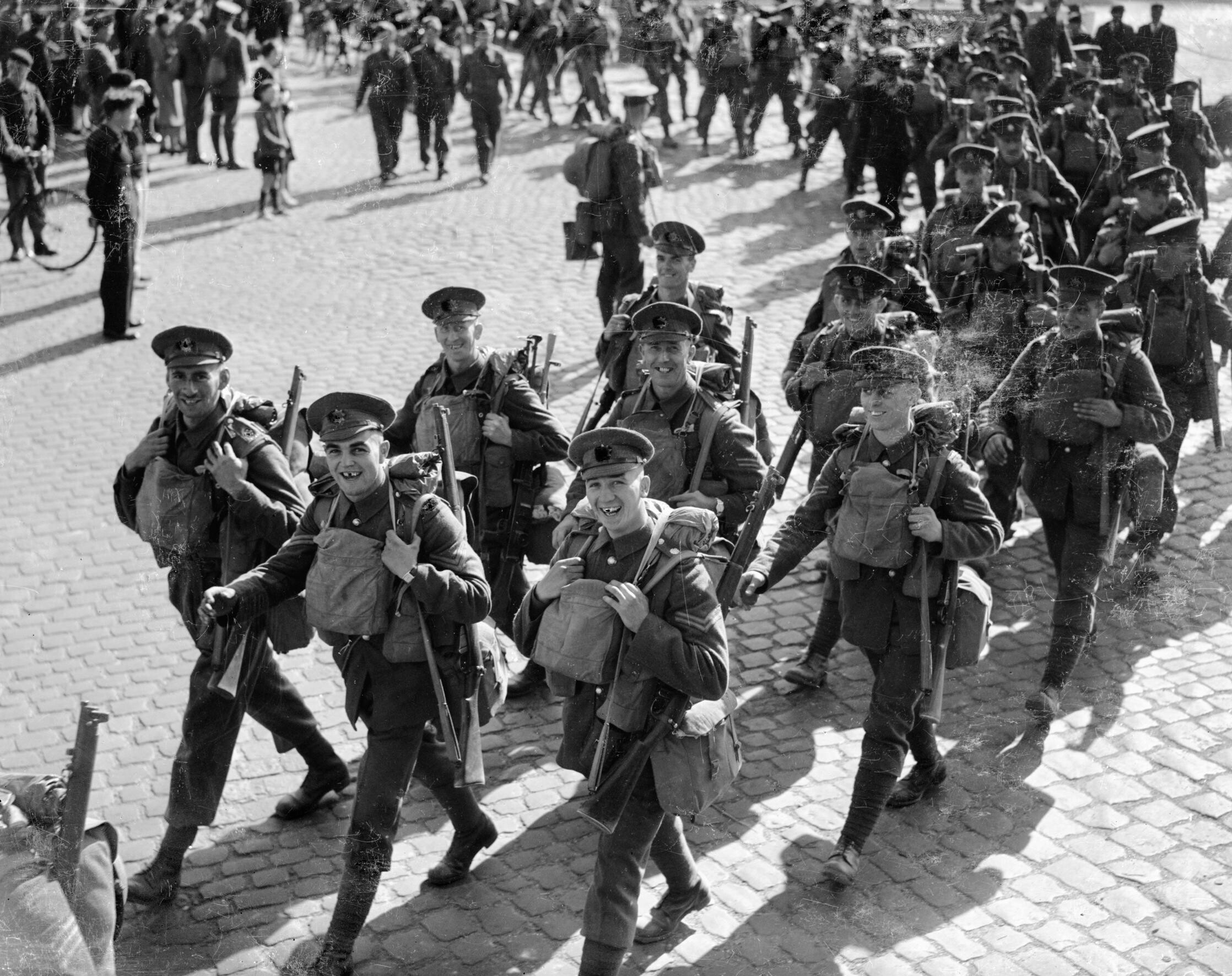
The 2nd Battalion, Coldstream Guards arrive in Cherbourg wearing Service Dress; October 1939.

The Service Dress uniform continued to be the field uniform of the British Army until shortly before the Second World War, although many units continued to wear it after the start of hostilities and many Home Guard personnel wore it throughout the War. Service Dress was officially replaced as the standard combat uniform of the British and Canadian Armies in 1939, with the introduction of Battle Dress. Service Dress continued to be used by officers throughout the war, as a walking out dress and for semi-formal functions. Senior officers might rarely be seen in any other uniform. The Sam Browne belt had been replaced as carrying equipment for officers by the '37 Pattern web equipment but continued to be worn with the Service Dress, usually reduced to the belt and one brace (worn as a cross strap), though a frog or pistol holster might be added as needed).

The Australian Army continued to wear its version of Service Dress as its standard combat uniform throughout the war.

== Current use ==
Officers

Other ranks

British Army Number Two Dress (Yorkshire Regiment)

When Battle Dress was replaced with the green cotton 1960 Pattern Combat Dress, Service Dress was reintroduced as an intermediary between combat uniforms and Full Dress as Number Two Dress.The tunic has become a jacket, with an open collar for wear with collared shirt and tie, and cap, jacket, and trousers are all made from a smoother cloth than the rough serge. In some regiments a beret is worn in place of the peaked cap.

== See also ==
- British Battledress
- British Army Uniform
- Dress Uniform
- Military uniform
