= Battle dress (disambiguation) =

Battle dress, field uniform, or combat uniform, is a type of uniform worn in the field/combat.

Battle dress may also refer to:

- British Battledress, the combat uniform worn by the British Army from the late 1930s until the 1960s
- Battle Dress Uniform, the combat uniform worn by the United States Armed Forces from the early 1980s to the mid-2000s
