= Lieutenant colonel (United Kingdom) =

Rank in the British Army and Royal Marines

- Army No. 2 and Royal Marines No. 1B service uniform insignia
- Country: United Kingdom
- Service branch: British Army; Royal Marines
- Abbreviation: Lt Col
- Rank group: Field officers
- NATO rank code: OF-4
- Next higher rank: Colonel
- Next lower rank: Major
- Equivalent ranks: Commander (RN); Wing commander (RAF)

Lieutenant colonel (Lt Col) is a rank in the British Army and Royal Marines which is also used in many other countries. The rank is superior to major, and subordinate to colonel. The comparable Royal Navy rank is commander, and the comparable rank in the Royal Air Force and many other Commonwealth air forces is wing commander.

The rank insignia in the British Army and Royal Marines, as well as many Commonwealth countries, is a crown above a four-pointed "Bath" star, also colloquially referred to as a "pip". The crown has varied in the past with different monarchs; the current one being the Tudor Crown. Most other Commonwealth countries use the same insignia, or with the state emblem replacing the crown.

In the modern British Armed forces, the established commander of a regiment or battalion is a lieutenant colonel.

From 1 April 1918 to 31 July 1919, the Royal Air Force maintained the rank of lieutenant colonel. It was superseded by the rank of wing commander on the following day.

== Ceremonial usage ==
Certain regiments of the British Army have honorary appointments as Regimental Lieutenant Colonel and Deputy Regimental Lieutenant Colonel. These are similar in nature and less in rank to Colonel of the Regiment.

== Historical insignia ==
1810 to 1855 lieutenant colonel's shoulder rank insignia

1856 to 1867 lieutenant colonel's collar rank insignia

1867 to 1880 lieutenant colonel's collar rank insignia

1881 to 1902 lieutenant colonel's shoulder rank insignia

1902 to 1920 lieutenant colonel's sleeve cuff rank insignia

== See also ==
- British and U.S. military ranks compared
- British Army Other Ranks rank insignia
- British Army officer rank insignia
- Lieutenant colonel (United States)
