= Captain (British Army and Royal Marines) =

Rank of the British Army and Royal Marines

- Army No. 2 and Royal Marines No. 1B service uniform insignia
- Country: United Kingdom
- Service branch: British Army; Royal Marines
- Abbreviation: Capt
- Rank group: Junior officers
- NATO rank code: OF-2
- Non-NATO rank: O-2
- Formation: c. 1815
- Next higher rank: Major
- Next lower rank: Lieutenant
- Equivalent ranks: Lieutenant (RN); Flight lieutenant (RAF)

Captain (Capt) is a junior officer rank of the British Army and Royal Marines and in both services it ranks above lieutenant and below major with a NATO ranking code of OF-2. The rank is equivalent to a lieutenant in the Royal Navy and to a flight lieutenant in the Royal Air Force. The rank of captain in the Royal Navy is considerably more senior (equivalent to the Army/RM rank of colonel) and the two ranks should not be confused.

In the 21st-century British Army, captains are often appointed to be second-in-command (2IC) of a company or equivalent sized unit of up to 120 soldiers.

== History ==
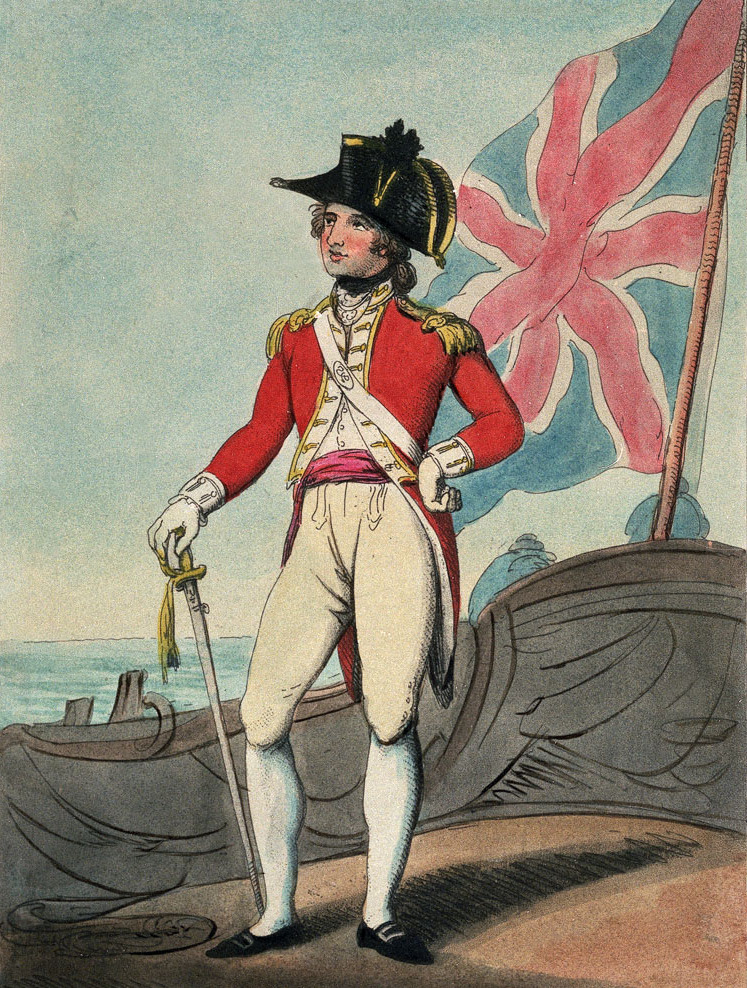
1799 illustration of a British Marines captain

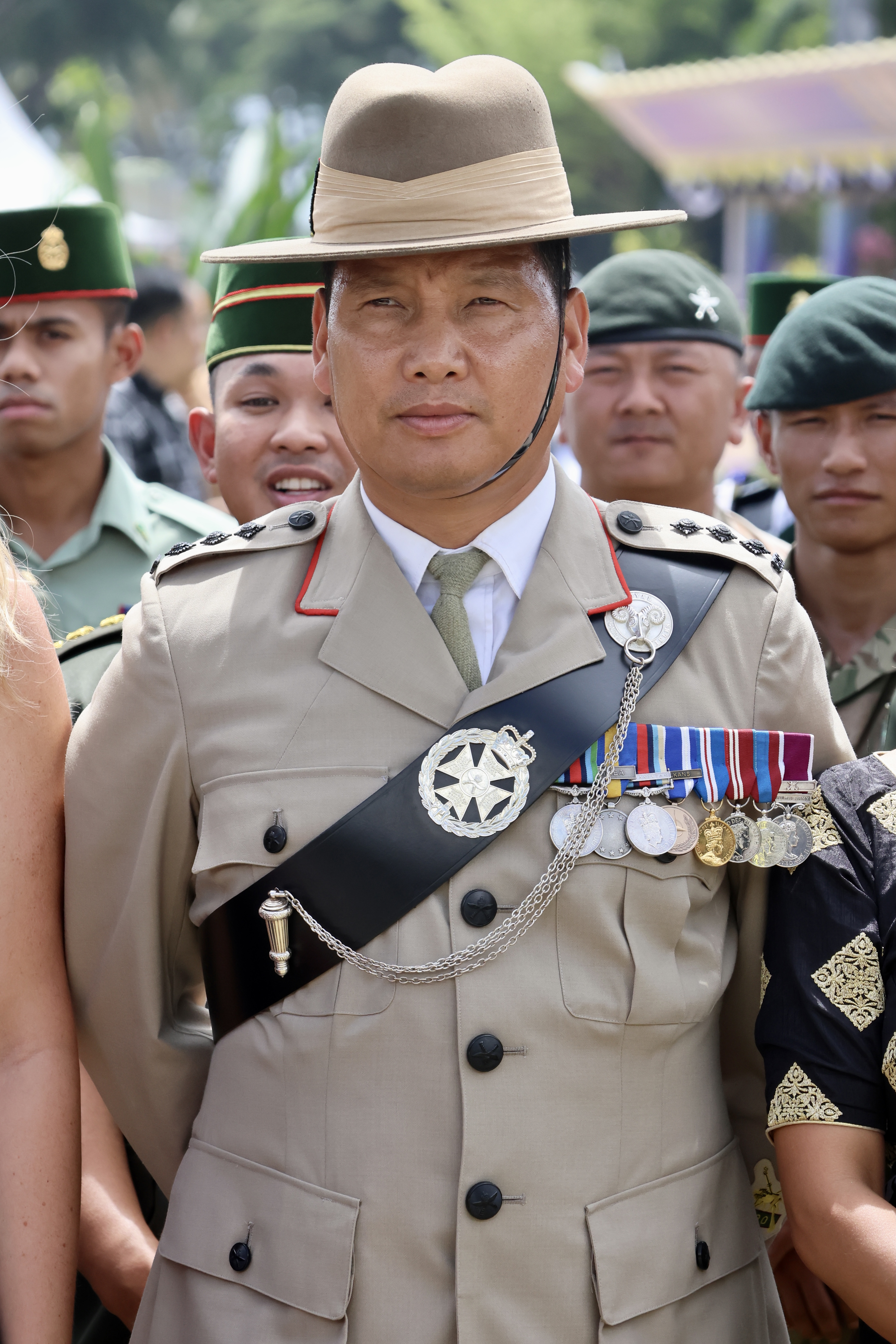
A Royal Gurkha Rifles captain in ceremonial dress, 2023

A rank of second captain existed in the Ordnance at the time of the Battle of Waterloo.

From 1 April 1918 to 31 July 1919, the Royal Air Force maintained the junior officer rank of captain. RAF captains had a rank insignia based on the two bands of a naval lieutenant with the addition of an eagle and crown above the bands. It was superseded by the rank of flight lieutenant on the following day.

== Rank insignia ==
1856 to 1880 captain's rank insignia

1881 to 1902 captain's rank insignia

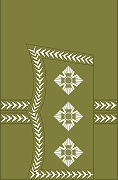
1902 to 1920 captain's rank insignia (general pattern)

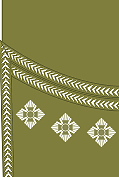
1902 to 1920 captain's rank insignia (Scottish pattern)

Badges of rank for captains were introduced on 30 January 1855 and were worn on shoulder epaulettes. After the Crimean War a new rank system was introduced which contained the first complete rank insignia in British Army history. A captain's rank insignia was worn on the collar and displayed a crown and a pip (which is now the rank insignia for a lieutenant-colonel).

The rank insignia were returned to the shoulder boards in 1880 for all officers in full dress, when the system of crowns and stars was reorganised. From this time, until 1902, a captain had just two stars. The 1902 change gave captains three stars, which continues to be used. In addition to the shoulder badges, officers' ranks were also reflected in the amount and pattern of gold lace worn on the cuffs of the full-dress tunic.

From 1902, a complex system of markings with bars and loops in thin drab braid above the cuff (known irreverently as the asparagus bed) was used at first but this was replaced in the same year by a combination of narrow rings of worsted braid around the cuff, with the full-dress style shoulder badges on a three-pointed cuff flap. Based on equivalent naval ranks, captains had two rings of braid. In the case of Scottish regiments, the rings were around the top of the gauntlet-style cuff and the badges on the cuff itself.

During World War I, some officers took to wearing similar jackets to the men, with the rank badges on the shoulder, as the cuff badges made them conspicuous to snipers. This practice was frowned on outside the trenches but was given official sanction in 1917 as an alternative, being made permanent in 1920 when the cuff badges were abolished.

== Fictional captains ==
The rank has sometimes been used in English Literature and applied to fictional characters. Some of the fictional captains are:

- Arthur Hastings - companion-chronicler and best friend of the Belgian detective Hercule Poirot in Agatha Christie's novels.
- Edmund Blackadder - a career officer in the Blackadder Goes Forth television series.

== See also ==
- British and U.S. military ranks compared
- British Army Other Ranks rank insignia
- British Army officer rank insignia
