= Lieutenant (British Army and Royal Marines) =

Rank in British Army and Royal Marines

- Army No. 2 and Royal Marines No. 1B service uniform insignia
- Country: United Kingdom
- Service branch: British Army; Royal Marines
- Abbreviation: Lt
- Rank group: Junior officers
- NATO rank code: OF-1
- Next higher rank: Captain
- Next lower rank: Second lieutenant
- Equivalent ranks: Sub-lieutenant (RN); Flying officer (RAF)

Lieutenant (UK: /lɛfˈtɛnənt/; Lt) is a junior officer rank in the British Army and Royal Marines. It ranks above second lieutenant and below captain and has a NATO ranking code of OF-1 and is the senior subaltern rank. Unlike some armed forces which use first lieutenant, the British rank is simply lieutenant, with no ordinal attached. The rank is equivalent to that of a flying officer in the Royal Air Force (RAF). Although formerly considered senior to a Royal Navy (RN) sub-lieutenant, the British Army and Royal Navy ranks of lieutenant and sub-lieutenant are now considered to be of equivalent status. The Army rank of lieutenant has always been junior to the Navy's rank of lieutenant.

== Usage ==
In the 21st-century British Army, the rank is ordinarily held for up to three years. A typical appointment for a lieutenant might be the command of a platoon or troop of approximately thirty soldiers.

Before 1871, when the whole British Army switched to using the current rank of "lieutenant", the Royal Artillery, Royal Engineers and Fusilier regiments used "first lieutenant" and "second lieutenant".

=== Form of address ===
In the United Kingdom, "Lieutenant" is a rank which is not used as a form of address, unlike "Captain" and higher ranks. A Lieutenant called Smith is addressed and referred to as "Mr Smith".

== Historical insignia ==
From 1856 to 1880 a lieutenant's rank insignia was worn on the collar and comprised a single crown, the current insignia for a major. In 1881 lieutenants had their insignia changed to single pip and moved to the shoulder. In 1902 they received a second pip, the badge of rank which has been kept to the present.

1856 to 1880 Lieutenant's collar rank insignia

1881 to 1902 Lieutenant's shoulder rank insignia

During the First World War, some officers took to wearing similar jackets to the men, with the rank badges on the shoulder, as the cuff badges made them conspicuous to snipers. This practice was frowned on outside the trenches but was given official sanction in 1917 as an alternative, being made permanent in 1920 when the cuff badges were abolished. The cuff badges were:

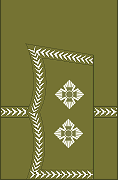
First World War lieutenant's rank insignia (general pattern)

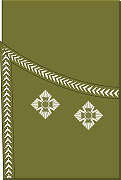
First World War lieutenant's rank insignia (Scottish pattern)

From 1 April 1918 to 31 July 1919, the Royal Air Force maintained the rank of Lieutenant. It was superseded by the rank of flying officer on the following day.

== See also ==
- Comparison of United Kingdom and United States military ranks
- British Army other ranks rank insignia
- British Army officer rank insignia
