= Uniforms of the British Armed Forces =

Each branch of the British Armed Forces has its own uniform regulations. Many of these uniforms are also the template for those worn in the British cadet forces.

- Uniforms of the British Army
- Uniforms of the Royal Navy
- Uniforms of the Royal Marines
- Uniforms of the Royal Air Force

== Uniforms overview ==
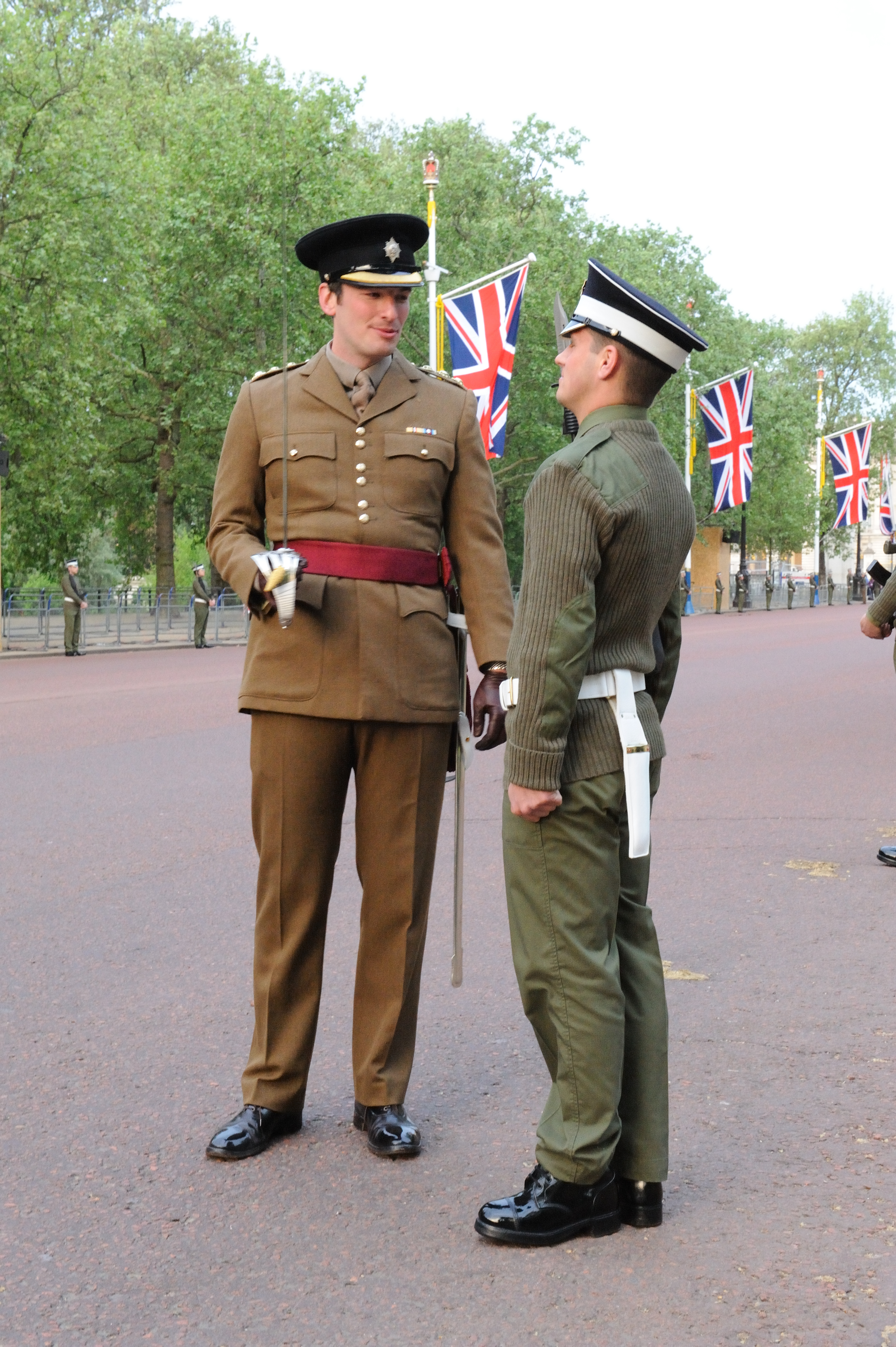
Army

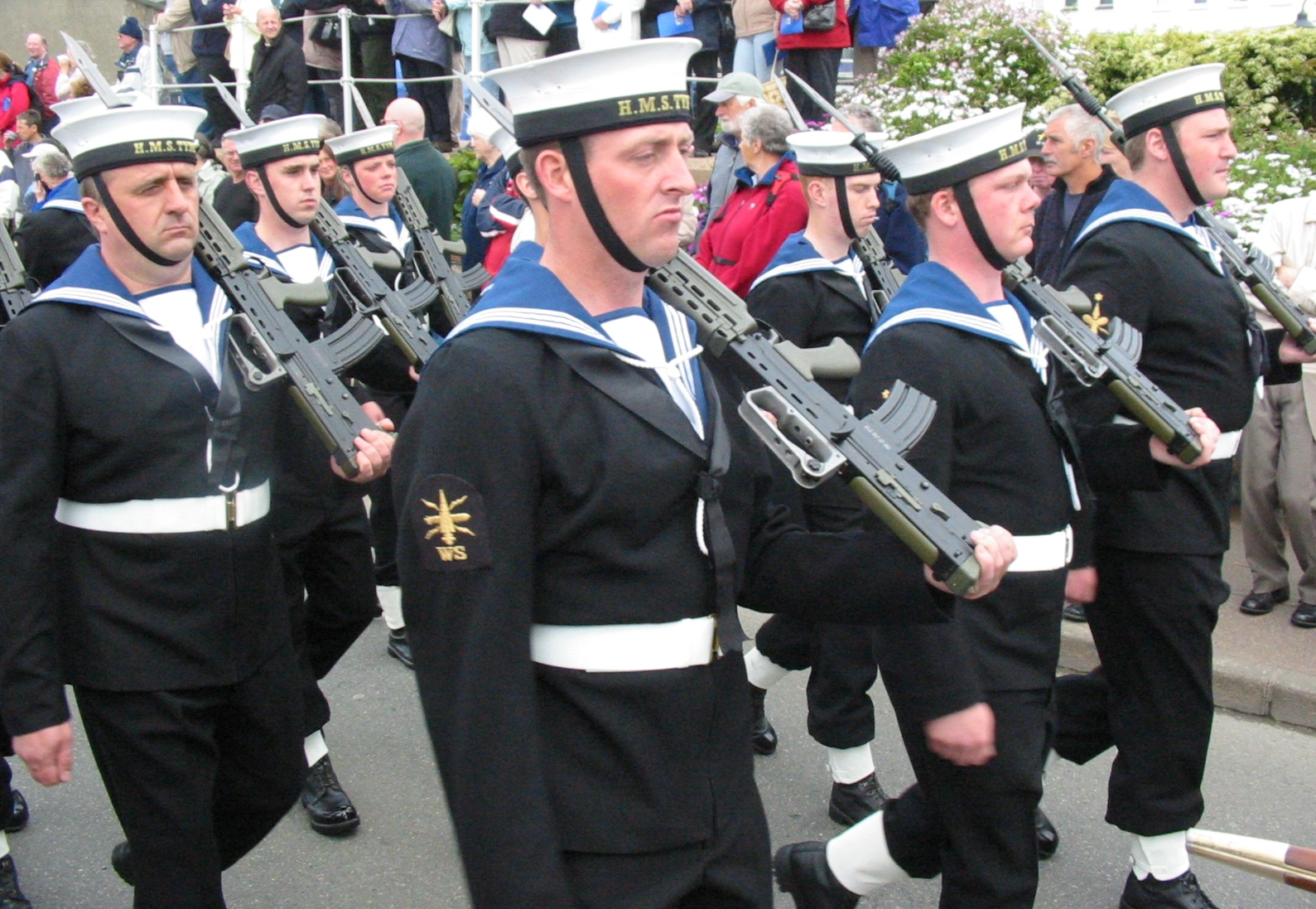
Royal Navy

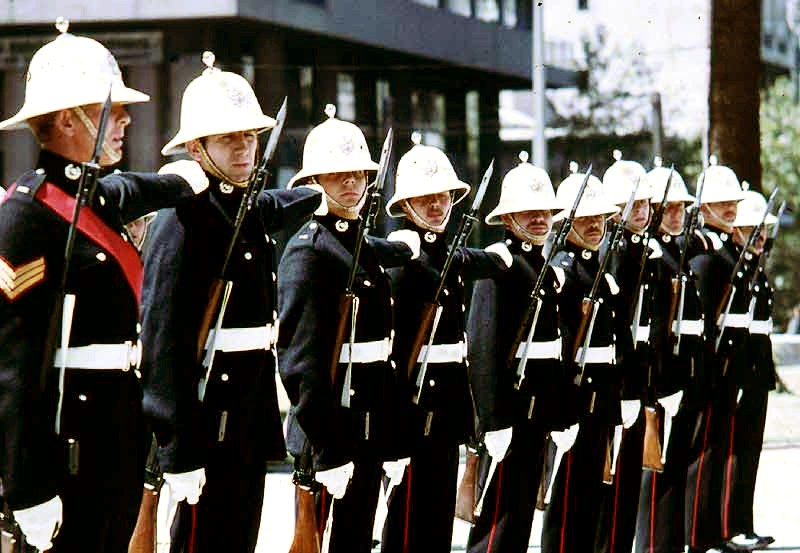
Royal Marines

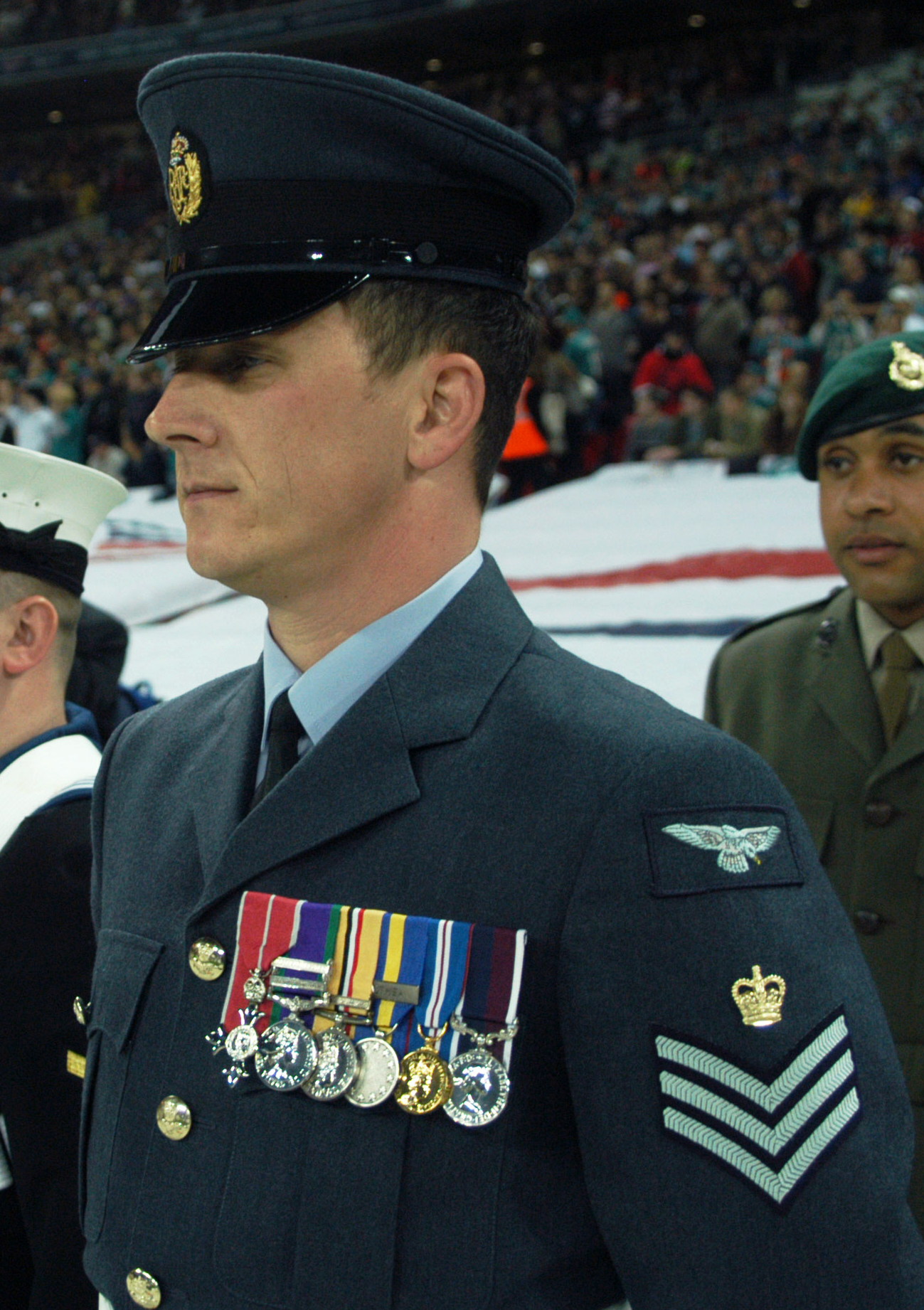
Royal Air Force

== Headdress ==
Cap badges are worn on most types of headdress, with the exception of operational headdress (which is not usually worn in public).

=== Turbans ===
Turbans are worn by Sikh members of the British Armed Forces.

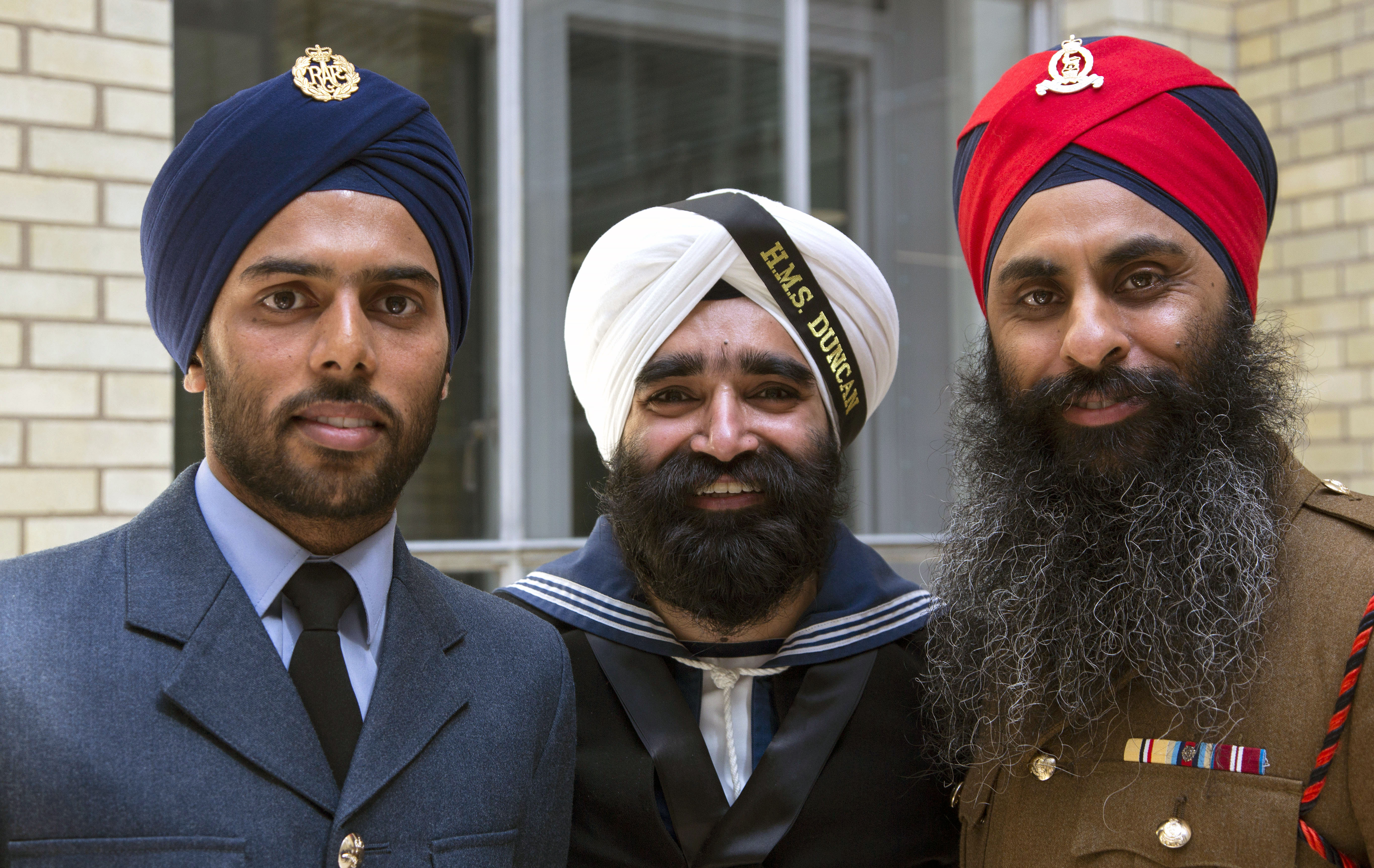
Sikh service members wearing turbans. The turban of the junior rating lacks a cap badge, as is the case with the sailor cap it replaces.

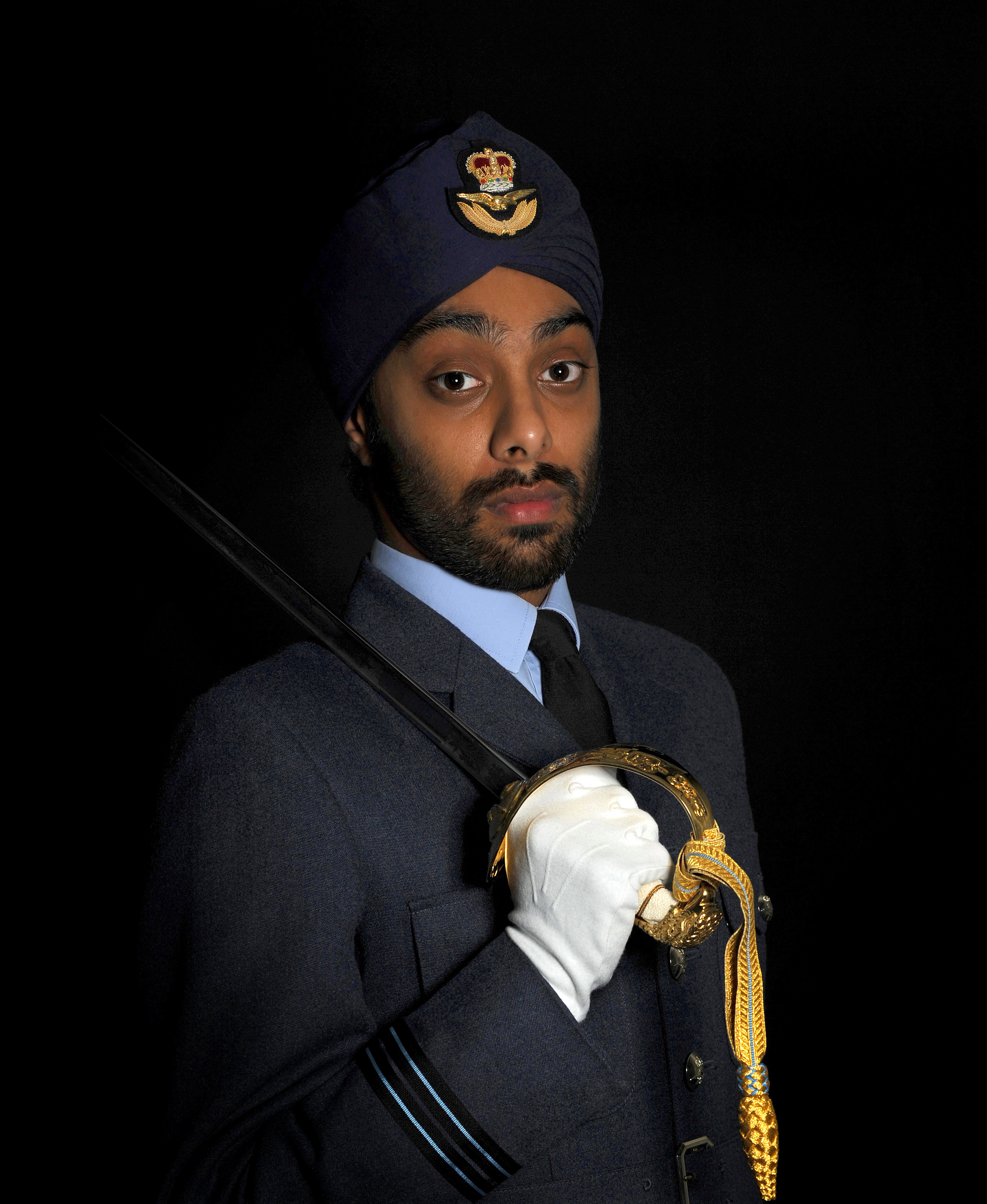
A Sikh Royal Air Force officer with an officer's cap badge on a turban.

== See also ==
- Royal Fleet Auxiliary#Uniforms
- Cap comforter
- Tactical recognition flash
- Military uniform#United Kingdom
