= Major (United Kingdom) =

Military rank which is used by both the British Army and Marines

- Army No. 2 and Royal Marines No. 1B service uniform insignia
- Country: United Kingdom
- Service branch: British Army; Royal Marines
- Abbreviation: Maj
- Rank group: Field officers
- NATO rank code: OF-3
- Next higher rank: Lieutenant colonel
- Next lower rank: Captain
- Equivalent ranks: Lieutenant commander (RN); Squadron leader (RAF)

Major (Maj) is a military rank which is used by both the British Army and Royal Marines. The rank is superior to captain and subordinate to lieutenant colonel. The insignia for a major is a crown. The equivalent rank in the Royal Navy is lieutenant commander, and squadron leader in the Royal Air Force.

== History ==
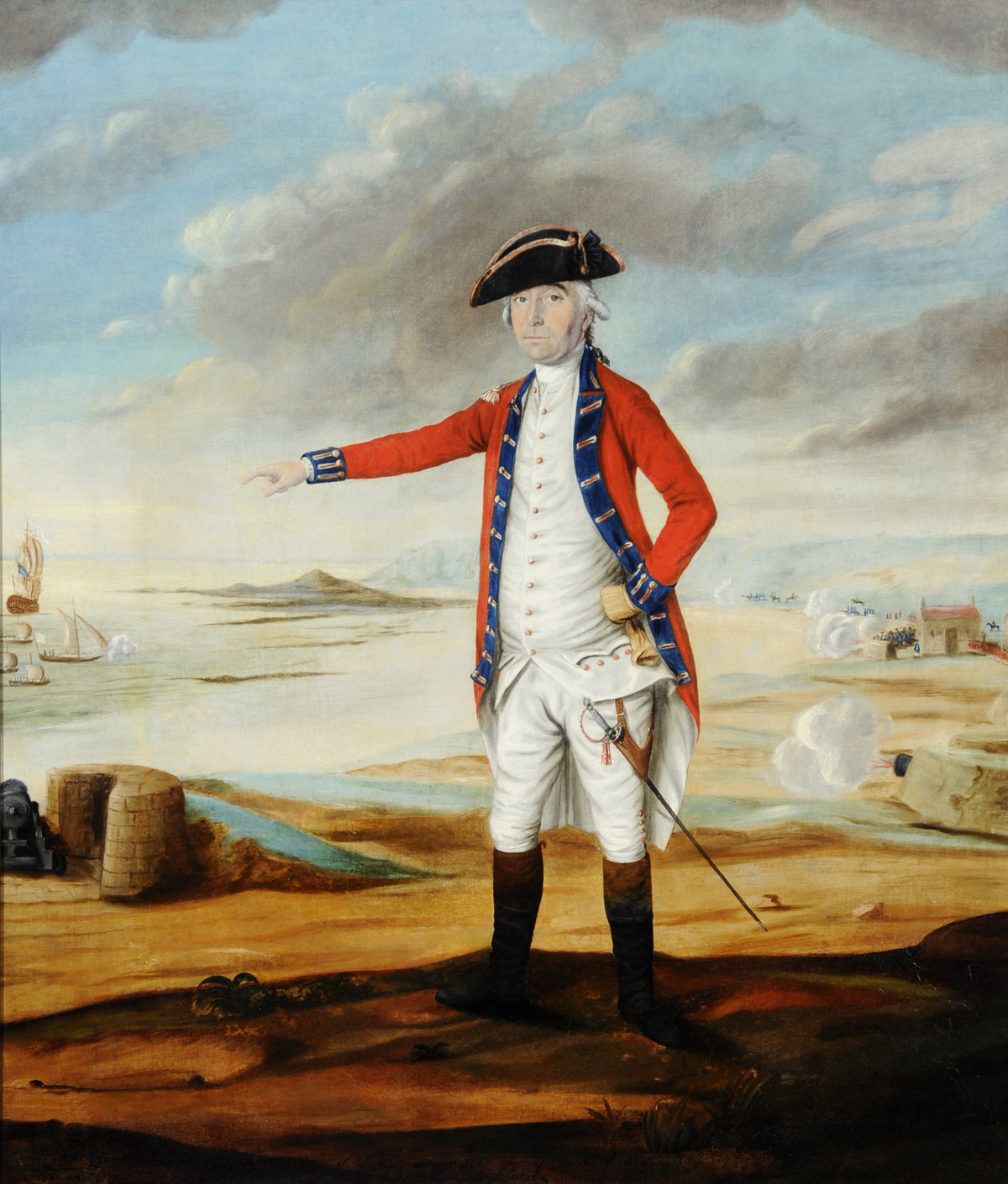
c. 1779 portrait of Major Moses Corbet

By the time of the Napoleonic wars, an infantry battalion usually had two majors, designated the "senior major" and the "junior major". The senior major effectively acted as second-in-command and the majors often commanded detachments of two or more companies split from the main body. The second-in-command of a battalion or regiment is still a major.

1856 to 1867 major's collar rank insignia

1867 to 1880 major's collar rank insignia

1881 to 1902 major's shoulder rank insignia

On 1 October 1913, General Sir Ivor Maxse introduced a scheme to reorganize the army. The regular battalions of the British Army were reorganized from the previous eight companies to a four-company structure, with each company commanded by a major and having four platoons.

During World War I, majors wore the following cuff badges:

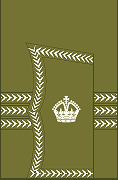
1902 to 1920 major's sleeve rank insignia (general pattern)

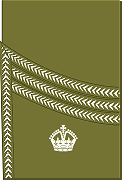
1902 to 1920 major's sleeve rank insignia (Scottish pattern)

During World War I, some officers took to wearing similar jackets to the men, with the rank badges on the shoulder, as the cuff badges made them conspicuous to snipers. This practice was frowned on outside the trenches but was given official sanction in 1917 as an alternative, being made permanent in 1920 when the cuff badges were abolished.

From 1 April 1918 to 31 July 1919, the Royal Air Force maintained the rank of major. It was superseded by the rank of squadron leader on the following day.

By World War I, majors were often commanding independent companies, squadrons, and batteries, but those that were organically part of a regiment or battalion were still usually commanded by captains. After World War II, major became the usual rank held by officers commanding all companies, squadrons, and batteries. In the 21st century British Army, officers normally attain the rank after around eight to 10 years of commissioned service. A common job for a major is the command of a sub-unit of 120 or fewer junior officers and soldiers.

== See also ==
- British and U.S. military ranks compared
- British Army Other Ranks rank insignia
- British Army officer rank insignia
