= Cap comforter =

Form of woollen headgear

Cap, Comforter
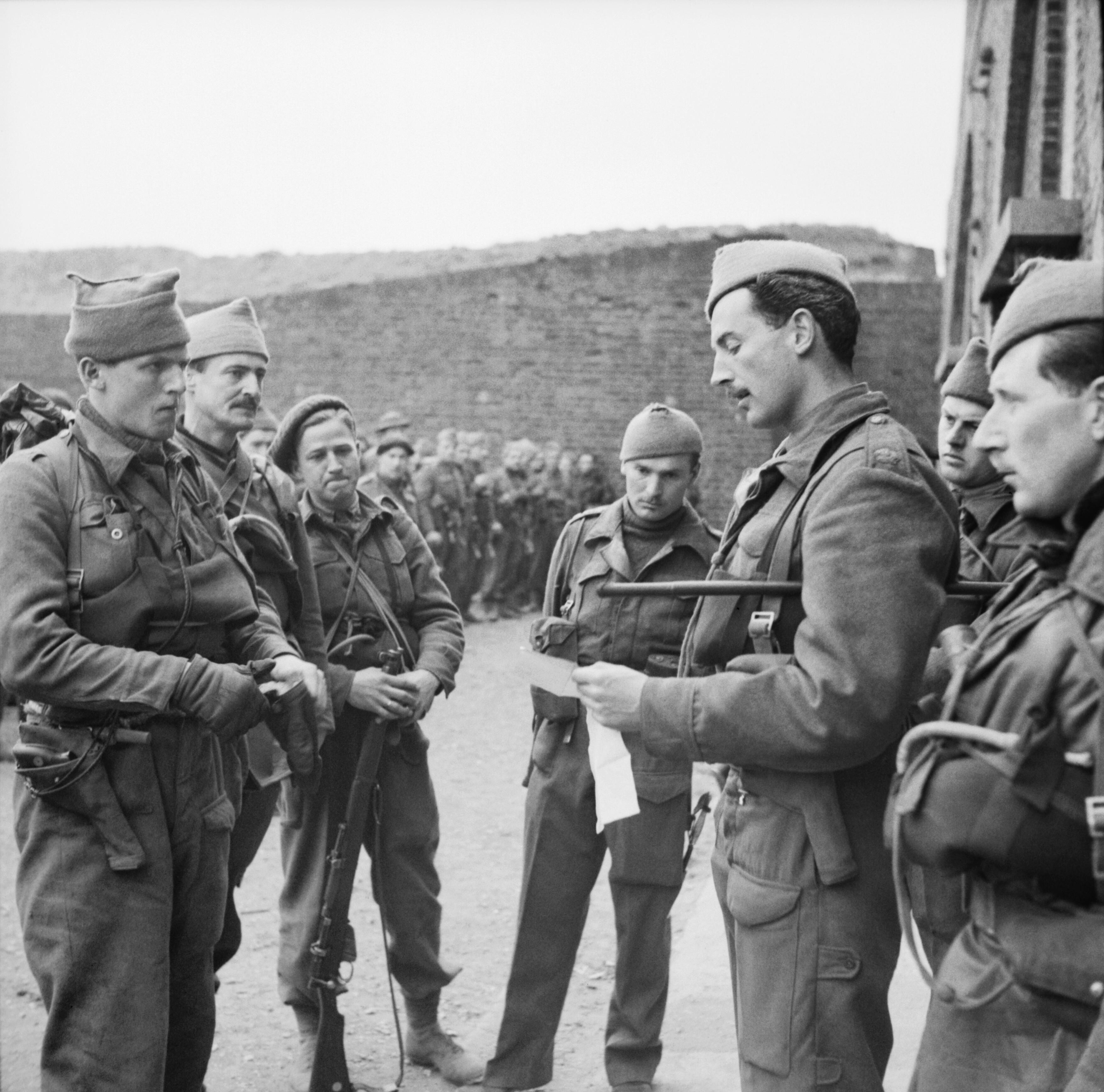
- Lord Lovat and other British commandos wearing cap comforters in 1942
- Place of origin: United Kingdom

Service history
- In service: 19th century–Present
- Used by: United Kingdom; Australia; Netherlands
- Wars: First World War; Second World War; Afghanistan War

A cap comforter is a form of woollen military headgear originating in the British Army.

It is a cylinder of knitted wool, similar to a short scarf, that is typically fitted over the head and fashioned into a hat. It can be worn comfortably underneath a Brodie helmet, and is often sewn shut at one or both ends. The cap comforter bears no insignia, and can be easily stowed without being creased.

== History ==
Cap comforters were introduced in the late 19th century as informal working headdress for British soldiers performing manual labour at camp, and as a comfortable undress cap on active service.

=== First World War ===
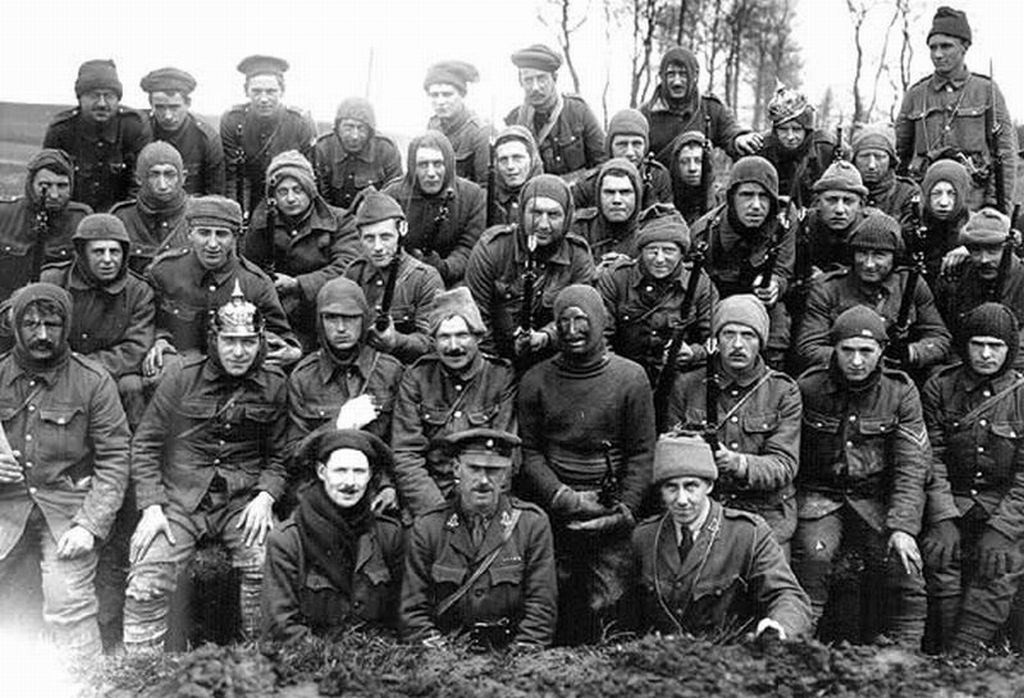
Trench raiders wearing cap comforters in various ways in 1916

Cap comforters were worn during the First World War as a warm alternative to the service dress cap, as the fabric could be pulled low over the ears in the cold winter trenches. Their casual and non-rigid silhouette made them an ideal item for night time trench raids.

=== Second World War ===
In the Second World War, soldiers in many British and Canadian regiments wore cap comforters during field training and while carrying out manual tasks.

==== Commandos ====
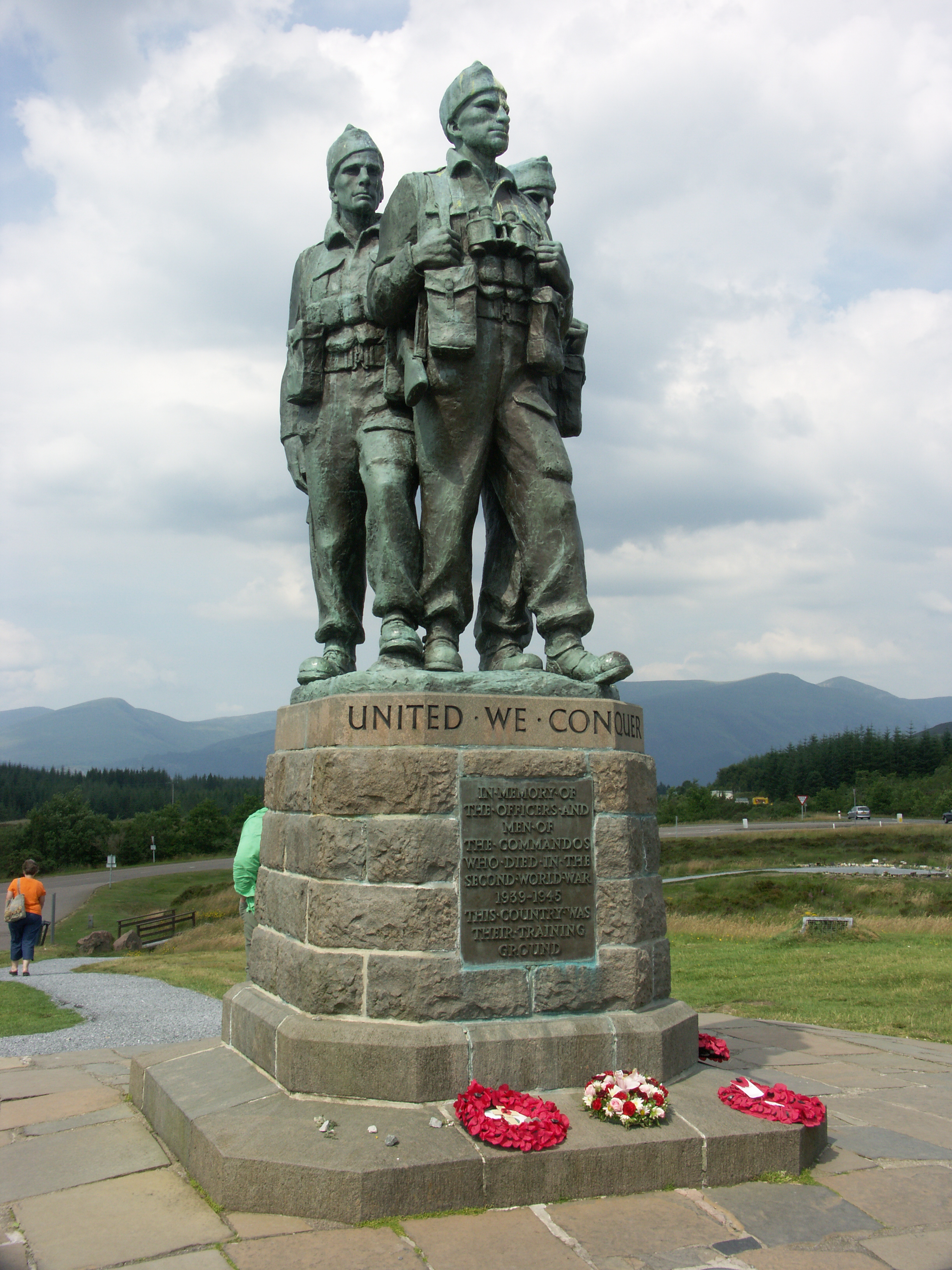
The Commando Memorial depicts three soldiers wearing the cap comforter

The British commandos were an international force recruited from across various Allied units, many with distinctive headdresses. As a solution to this lack of uniformity, commando units adopted their own practical headgear. No. 1 Commando chose the green beret in imitation of the Royal Armoured Corps, whereas No. 2 and No. 9 adopted the Scottish tam o' shanter. Other units, including No. 4 Commando (and US Army Rangers attached during the Dieppe Raid), adopted the cap comforter as their headdress, because it had no prior affiliation with a nation or regiment.

In autumn 1942, the War Office approved the green beret as the official commando headgear, though the cap comforter continued to be worn, already synonymous with the apparel of the commandos.

=== Post-war ===
==== Canada ====
Canada had issued a number of knit headgear items since 1945, though the term "cap comforter" has been replaced with "toque."

==== United Kingdom ====
The Armed Forces have stopped issuing cap comforters, replacing them instead with headovers - similar items based on Wehrmacht toques. Headovers are not sewn at the ends, and so can be worn like balaclavas. However, cap comforters are still worn during commando training. Troops at CTCRM undertaking the All Arms wear them until they pass the Commando Tests and Royal Marines recruits wear them during the Commando phase of training).

==== Netherlands ====
Dutch Korps Commandotroepen also wear the headgear until they pass their selection course, after which they are qualified to wear a green beret.
