= Uniforms of the Royal Marines =

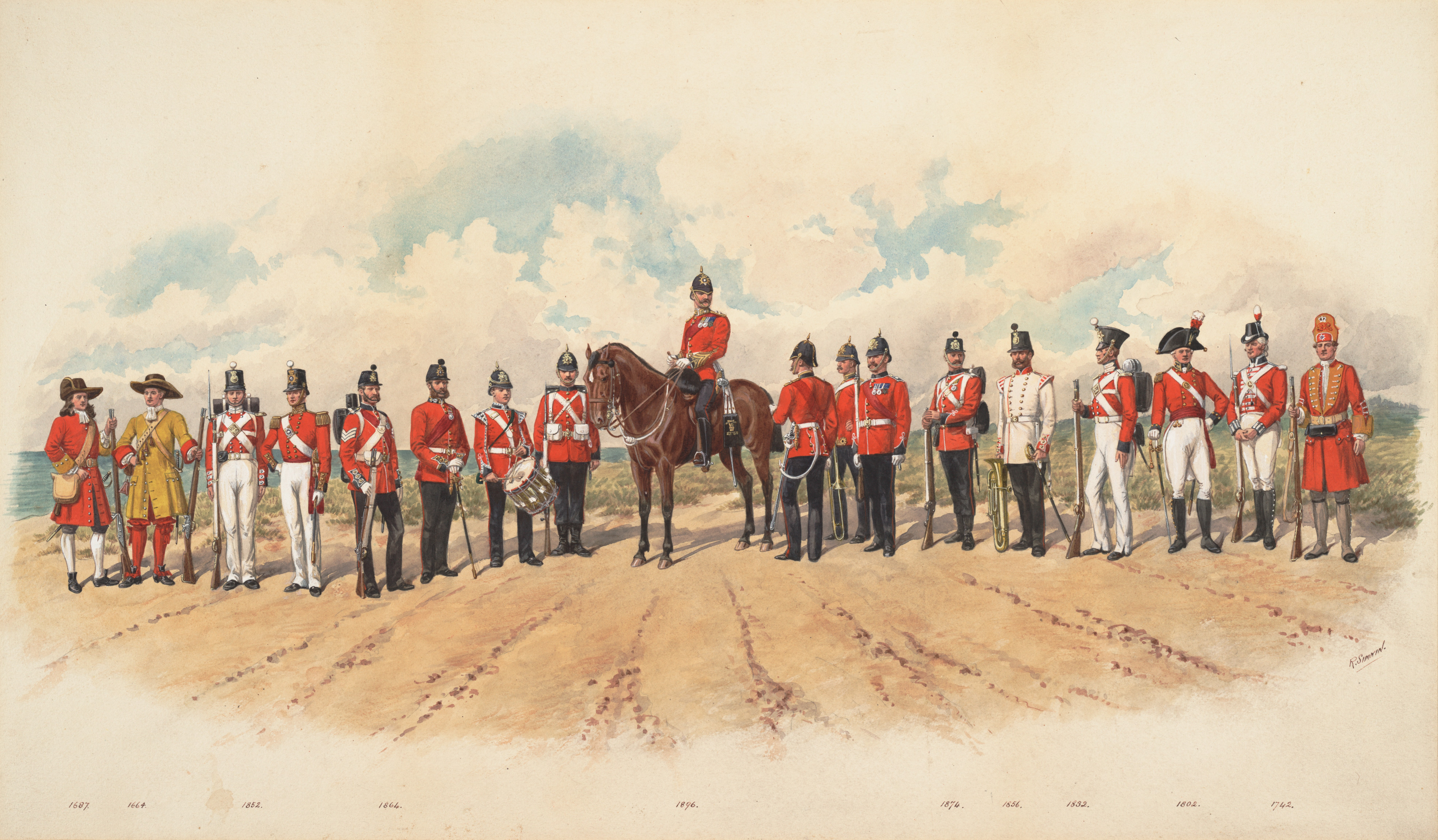
Royal Marine uniforms from 1664 to 1896

Selection of current Royal Marines officer uniforms; left to right: No.1A "Blues", No.1AW Tropical Dress, No.2A "Mess Dress", No.1B "Parade Lovats", No.3A "Half Lovats", No.3B General Duty Dress.

The Royal Marines uniform is the standardised military dress worn by members of the Royal Marines.

== Historic ==
Historically, Marine uniforms broadly matched those of the contemporary British Army, at least for full dress. The constraints of shipboard duty however brought some practical considerations – for ordinary work duties during the late 18th and early 19th centuries the marines would put aside their easily stained red coats and wear the loose "slop" clothing of the British sailors (then known as Jack Tars). The full uniform was worn for watch and guard duties and would also normally be worn in action. It is recorded that at Trafalgar many marines, in the heat of action, discarded their coats and fought in their checked shirts and blue trousers.

The original British marines of the Duke of York and Albany's Maritime Regiment of Foot (1664–1689) wore yellow (probably yellow-brown) coats with red breeches and black felt hats. Other short lived marine regiments during the period 1685 to 1699 wore dark blue, crimson or red coats. Queen Anne's six Marine Regiments wore red coats with different coloured facings according to the preference of their individual colonels. The dress of the ten Regiments of Marines raised for service between 1739 and 1748 is well documented in the coloured illustrations of the official 1742 Clothing Book. All wore red coats and breeches with mitre style caps. Facings, buttons and lace varied according to the regiment.

From the establishment of a permanent corps of Marine Regiments in 1755 to 1802, red coats with white facings were worn. The normal headdress was a tricorn (later bicorne) hat and the overall appearance closely resembled that of the Army's Regiments of Foot. Grenadier companies were issued with fur hats, for land service only, during the American War of Independence.

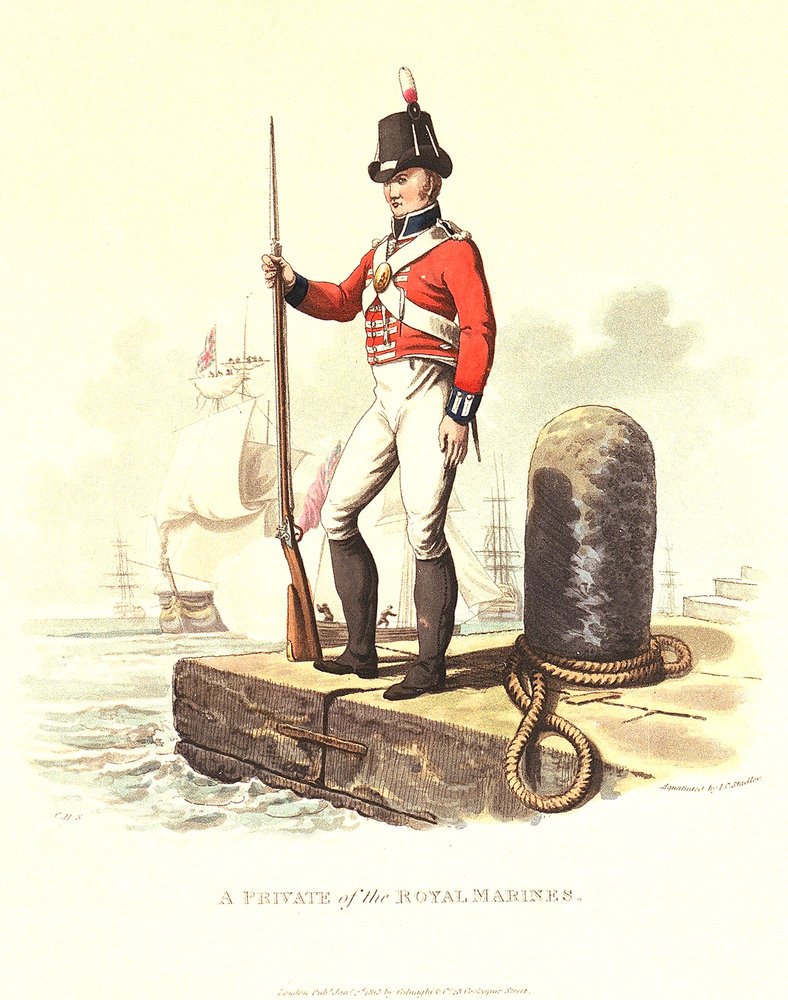
1815 illustration of a Royal Marine private by Charles Hamilton Smith

In 1802 the granting of the title "Royal Marines" meant a change to dark blue facings and a distinctive round hat made of lacquered felt. This is the headdress usually associated with the marines of Nelson's navy. The red coatee was adorned with white lace, extended from the buttons, in paired square ended loops. White breeches and gaiters were worn for parade during the Napoleonic Wars but blue or white trousers, during winter and summer, were normal shipboard wear. (This continued into the Victorian era.) Haythornthwaite observed that for ordinary duties, the wearing of casual or slop clothing often led to confusion between sailors and marines. Short white army jackets and bag-like undress caps were part of the sea-kit as documented aboard HMS Blenheim, to be worn in fine weather between 8am and 8pm. Light clothing for hot climates had been worn during the American Revolutionary War, but in 1798 only 500 sets had been produced. Field makes reference to the use of white uniforms worn in the taking of Réunion in 1810. From October 1816 onwards, the Royal Marine Artillery wore the dark blue coat – faced in red with yellow bastion lace loops for gunners – of the Royal Artillery, with only buttons and badges as a distinction.

The relatively peaceful period that followed the Napoleonic Wars saw the uniforms of the Royal Marines again closely follow Army styles. "Bell top" shakos and tight tail coats were adopted, regardless of their suitability for seagoing conditions. The Royal Marine Light Infantry continued to wear red coats with dark blue collars and cuffs.

The Royal Marines wore dark blue serge jackets in the Anglo-Egyptian Campaign of 1882 with embroidered badges on their collars - bugle horns for the RMLI and grenades for the RMA. During the subsequent Sudan Campaign a light grey field uniform was adopted. During the siege of the Peking Legations in 1900 the RMLI wore their usual hot weather ship-board working dress of blue field service cap, blue tunic and white trousers. Khaki or all white tropical uniforms were worn subsequent to the relief of the Legations.

In 1905 a white cloth helmet with bronze fittings was adopted to be worn with the scarlet and blue full dress of the RMLI and the dark blue and red of the RMA. This headdress was replaced in 1912 by the white Wolseley pattern pith helmet, which remains the most distinctive feature of modern Royal Marine full dress. The Royal Marine Brigade sent to Ostend in August 1914 wore dark blue undress uniforms but khaki service dress or khaki drill was worn for subsequent active service on land during World War I.

During the Inter-War years the newly merged Royal Marines wore a full dress that combined features of both the RMLI and RMA uniforms worn until 1914. This comprised a Wolseley helmet, dark blue tunic and trousers with scarlet collars and trouser welts. Shoulder cords and slashed cuffs were in yellow. This dress is still worn by the Royal Marines Band Service.

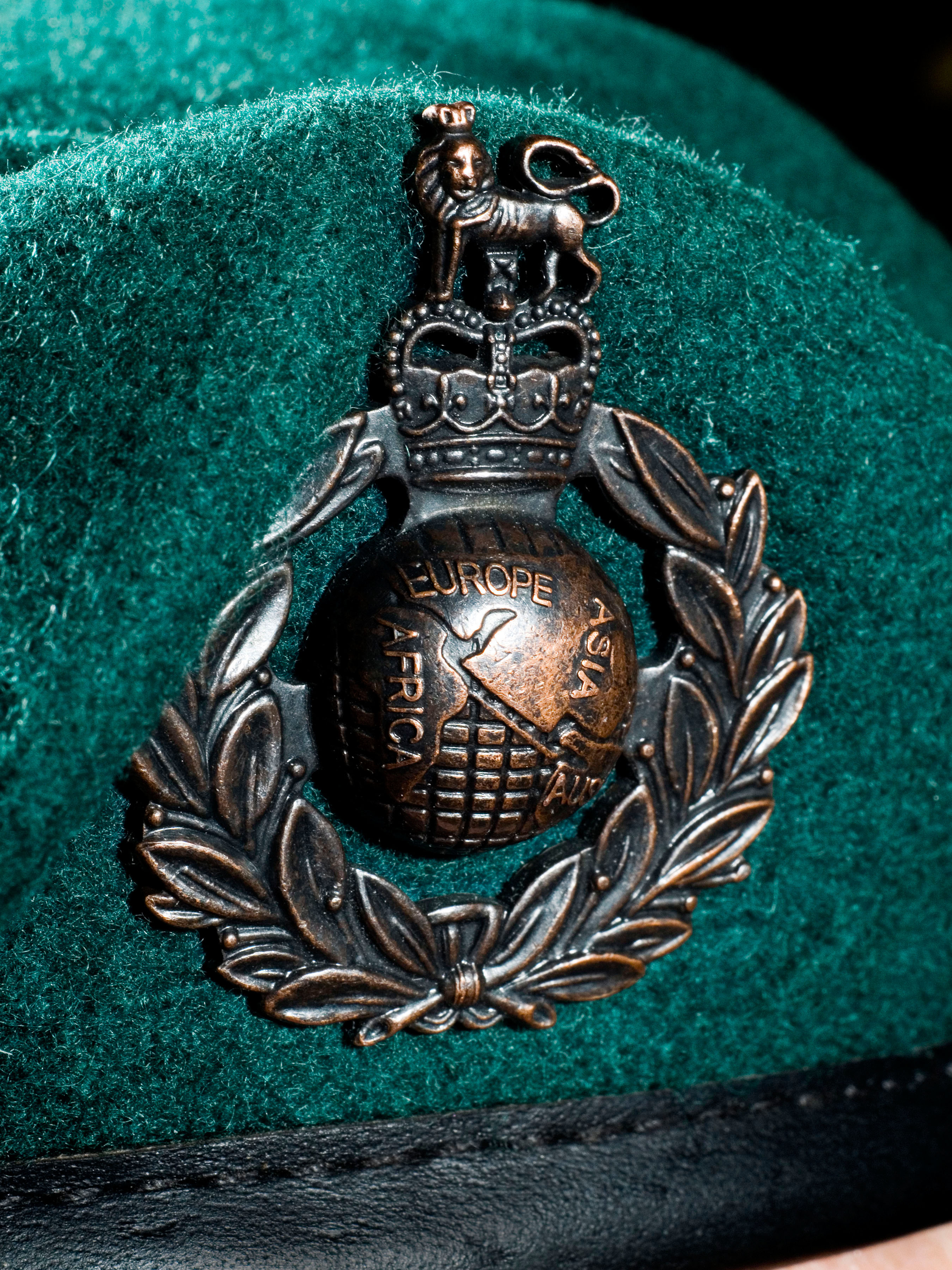
RM cap badge and green beret of the Royal Marines Commandos.

During World War II the Royal Marines wore khaki or blue battledress but retained their dark blue undress uniforms with red-banded peaked caps for certain off duty or ceremonial occasions. following approval by King George VI of the green beret as the official headdress for all Commando units, the Royal Marine Commandos were issued with Green Berets on 26 October 1942.

== Current uniforms ==
The modern Royal Marines retain a number of distinctive uniform items. These include the green "Lovat" service dress, the dark blue parade dress worn with the white Wolsley pattern helmet (commonly referred to as a "pith helmet") or red & white peaked cap, the scarlet and blue mess dress for officers and non-commissioned officers and the white hot-weather dress of the Band Service.

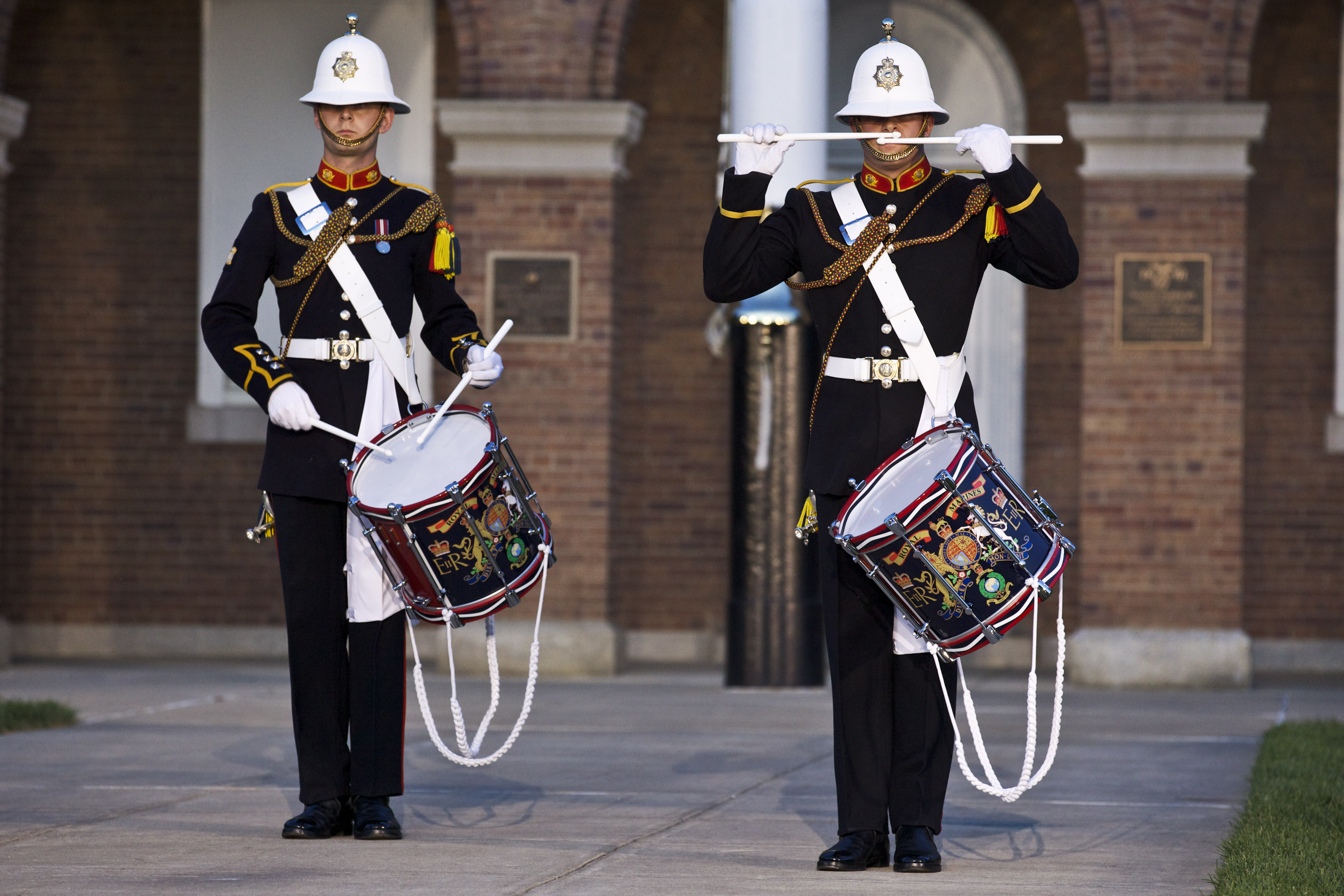
Buglers from the Band of His Majesty's Royal Marines Scotland with Number 1 Full Dress.

=== Number 1 Full Dress ===
This is normally worn only by the Royal Marines Band Service, while the simpler Number 1A dress or "blues" are worn by any other Royal Marine unit undertaking ceremonial duties. The Full Dress dates from 1923 and consists of a royal blue single-breasted tunic with red facings (with gold piping) and yellow cuff slashes. Royal blue trousers with a scarlet stripe and a white pith helmet are also worn. The uniform of the drum major features hussar style braiding across the front of the tunic. This uniform is also worn by the corps of drums of the Royal Marines Volunteer Cadet Corps.

=== Number 1A Regimental Blues Dress - "Blues" ===
Officers

Other ranks

No. 1A Blues Dress

This is similar to the "blue patrol" ceremonial uniform worn by the regiments of the British Army. It features scarlet stripes down the side of the trousers, and is worn with a peaked cap or pith helmet. It is worn with medals and decorations. Commissioned officers below the rank of major general have a special cut of uniform which is cut very much like British Army service dress but in blue, and is worn with a shirt and tie. General officers wear a uniform very similar to that worn by other ranks, but features gold shoulder cords and gorget patches.

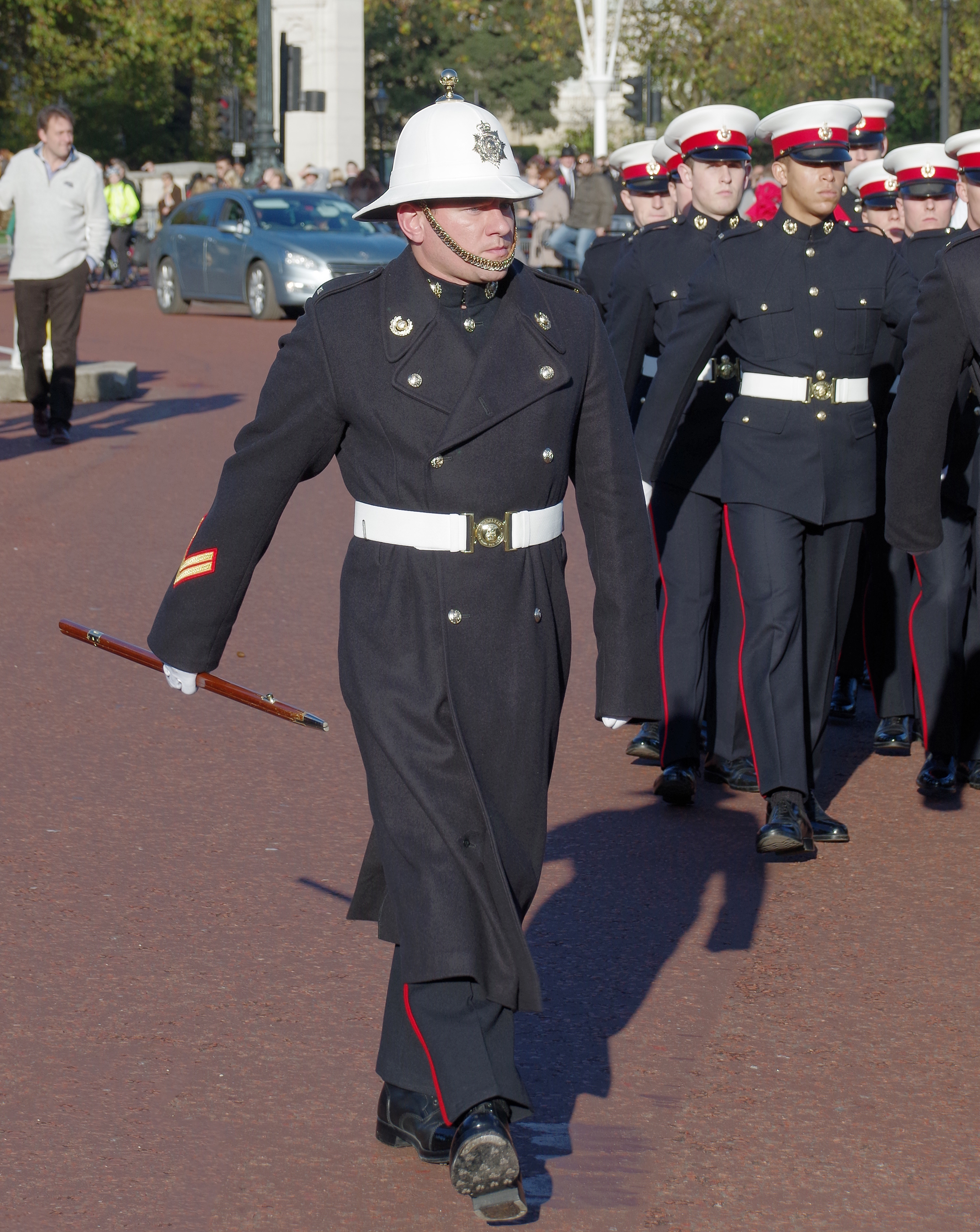
Royal Marines other ranks wearing Number 1A uniform with peaked caps (right), and in greatcoat order with pith helmet (left).

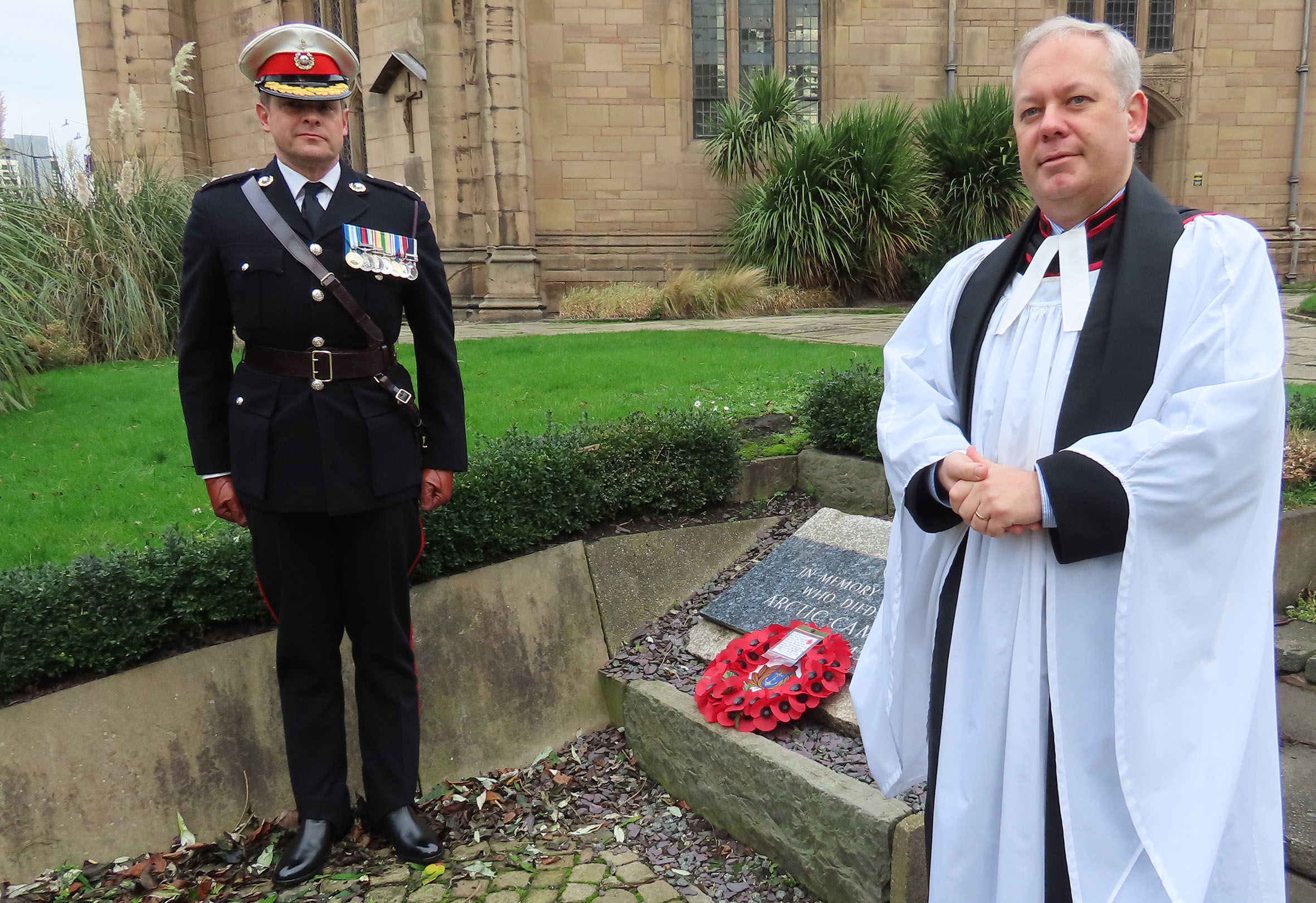
Variant of Number 1A for commissioned officers below the rank of major general

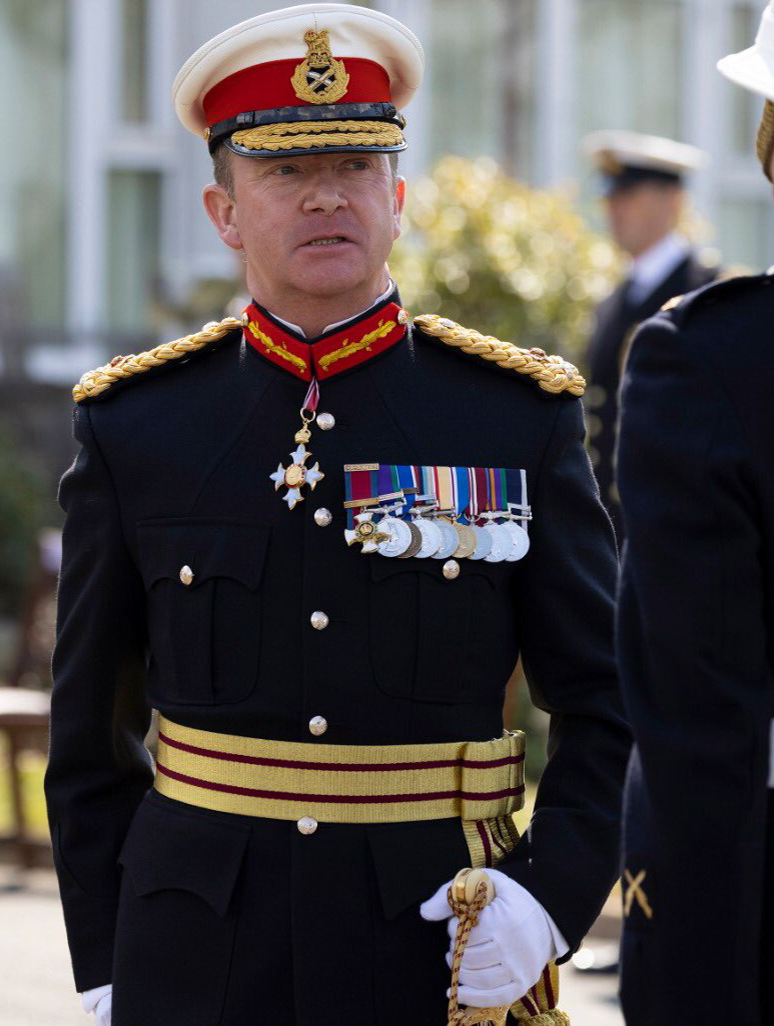
Variant of Number 1A for general officers

=== Number 1AW Dress - Tropical Ceremonial Dress ===
Similar to No 1 "Blues" but worn in tropical climates. The tunic's colour is white instead of blue.

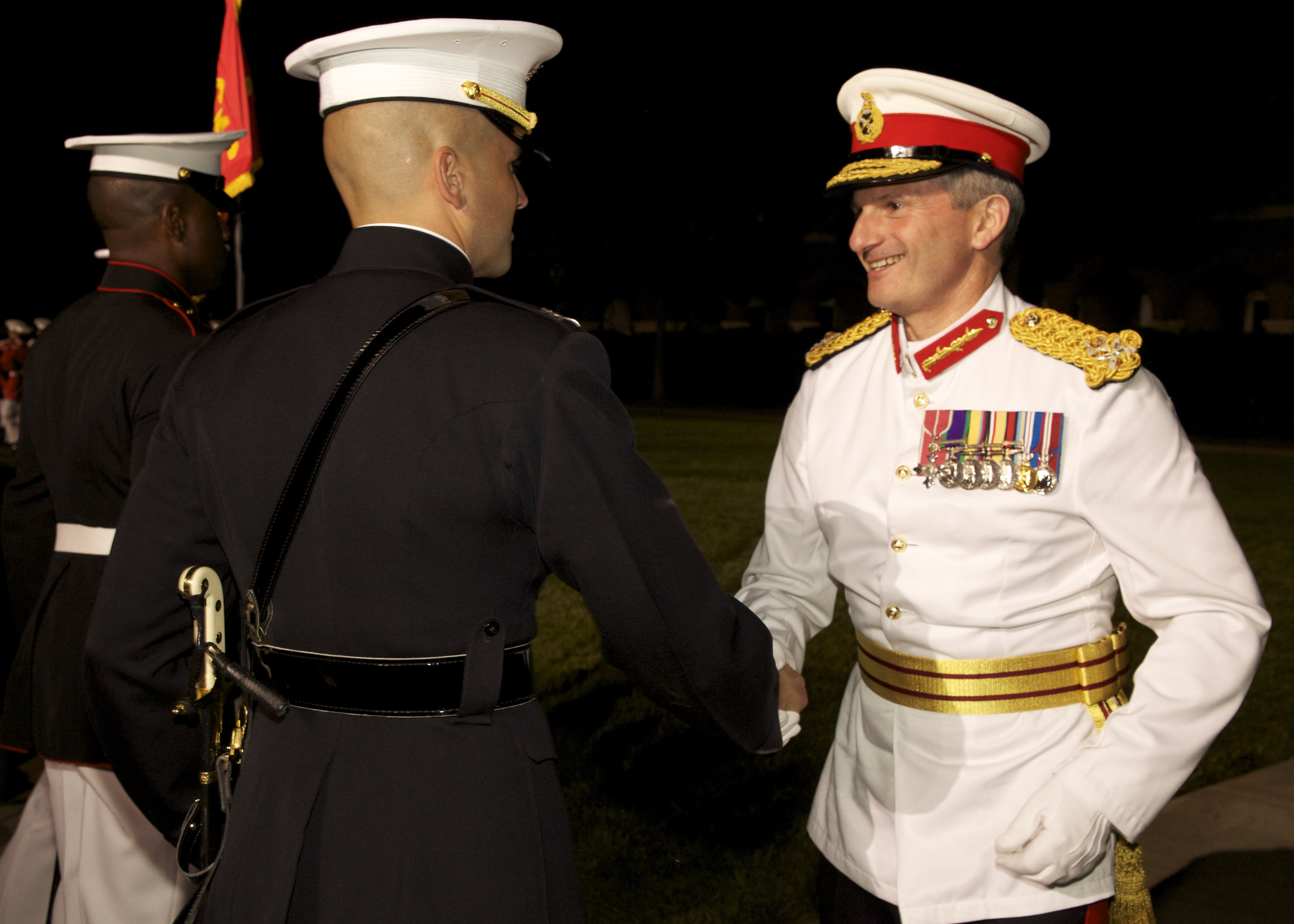
Commandant General Royal Marines Martin Smith wearing the No 1AW uniform.

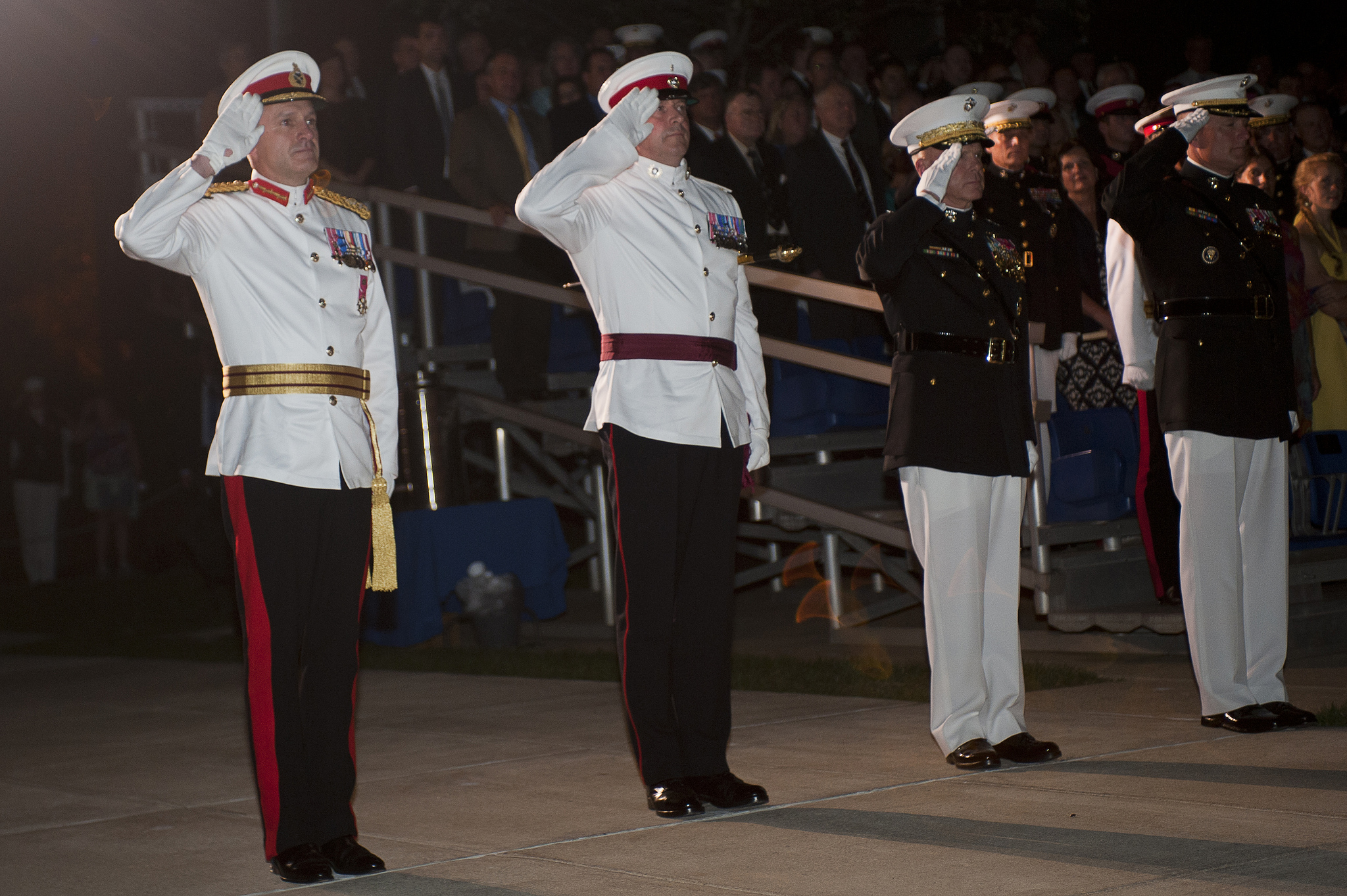
No 1AW variants worn by a Major General, left and a Warrant Officer, right.

=== Number 1B Lovat Dress - "Parade Lovats" ===
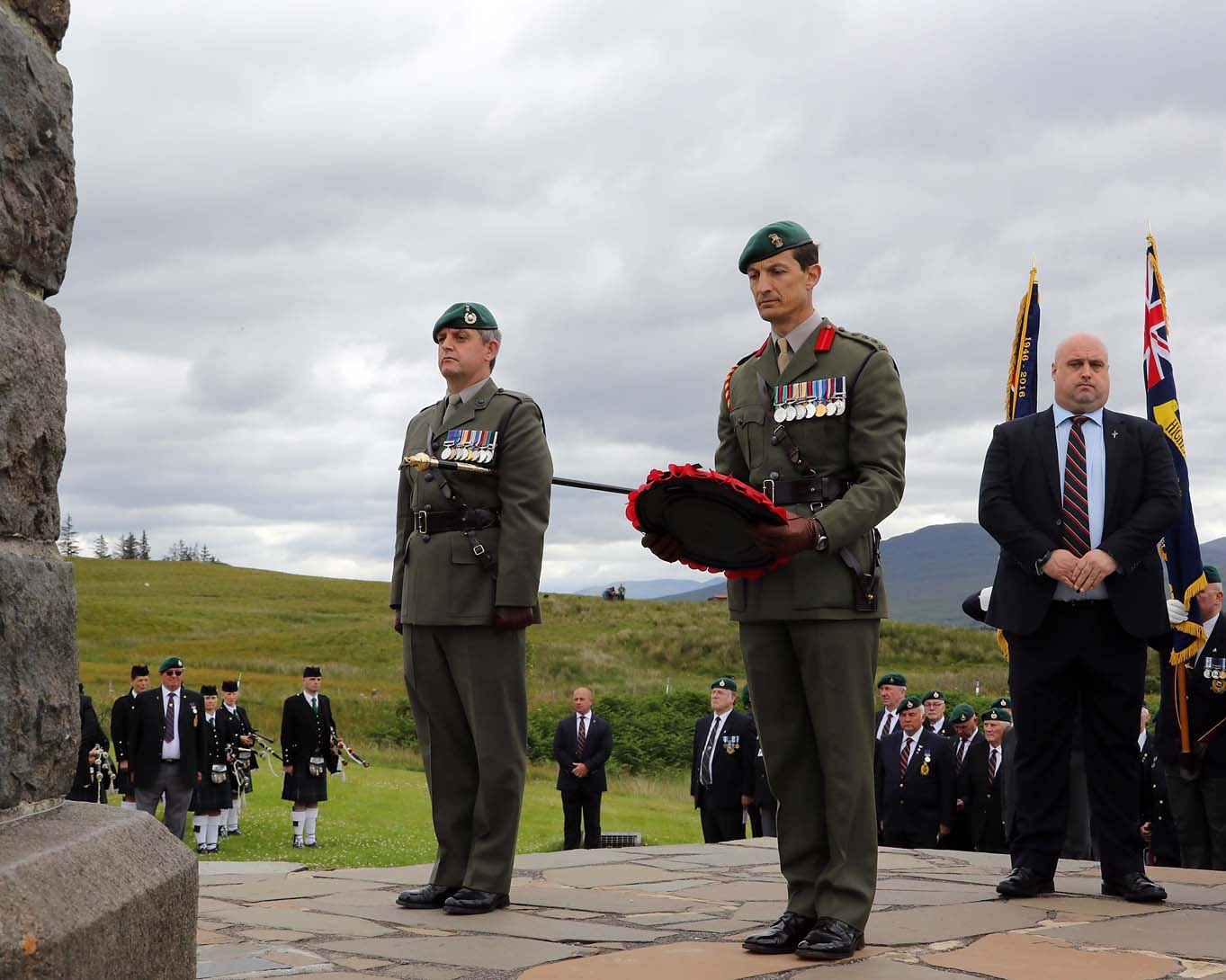
Number 1B dress with green beret.

Officers

Other ranks

No.1B Lovat Dress

Introduced on the 300th anniversary of the corps in 1964, this is similar in cut to the "Number 2" service dress worn by the British Army (of which it is the equivalent). It is in a unique shade of green known as "Lovat green", and features brown buttons. It is worn with decorations and medals, and is worn with a beret, in commando green for those who have passed the commando course, and navy blue with a scarlet patch behind the badge for those who have not passed the commando course who include recruits in training, musicians, cadets and instructors of the affiliated cadet organisations.

=== Number 1C Dress "Lovats Undress" ===
This is the same as 1B dress but is worn with medal ribbons instead of medals and decorations.

=== Number 2A Formal Evening Dress - "Mess Dress" and Number 2B "Mess Undress" ===
This consists of a scarlet mess jacket with a royal blue shawl collar, worn with royal blue trousers with a scarlet stripe, Marcella shirt and royal blue mess waistcoat. Officers above the rank of brigadier have their rank on shoulder straps, whilst all other officers have their rank marking positioned horizontally on the lapels of the collar. Officers of the rank of lieutenant-colonel and above wear stiff-fronted shirts and overalls (tight fitting cavalry trousers), whilst senior NCOs feature their rank insignia on the right arm. Commissioned officers have the option of wearing a side cap in number 2B dress. Number 2B dress differs only in that the peaked hat is not worn, whereas with 2A dress it is. Miniature medals and decorations are worn with these orders of dress.

=== Number 2C Informal Evening Dress "Red Sea Rig" ===
This is the informal evening uniform worn in ships and establishments. This consists of a white shirt worn with shoulder boards, black shoes, blue trousers and red cummerbund.

=== Number 3A General Duty Dress "Half Lovats" (Shirt Sleeve Order) - "Half Lovats" ===
This is a semi-formal uniform worn for general day-to-day duties and consists of a stone-coloured short-sleeved shirt, lovat green coloured trousers, worn with the peaked cap (or beret) and a stable belt in the corps colours and black shoes.

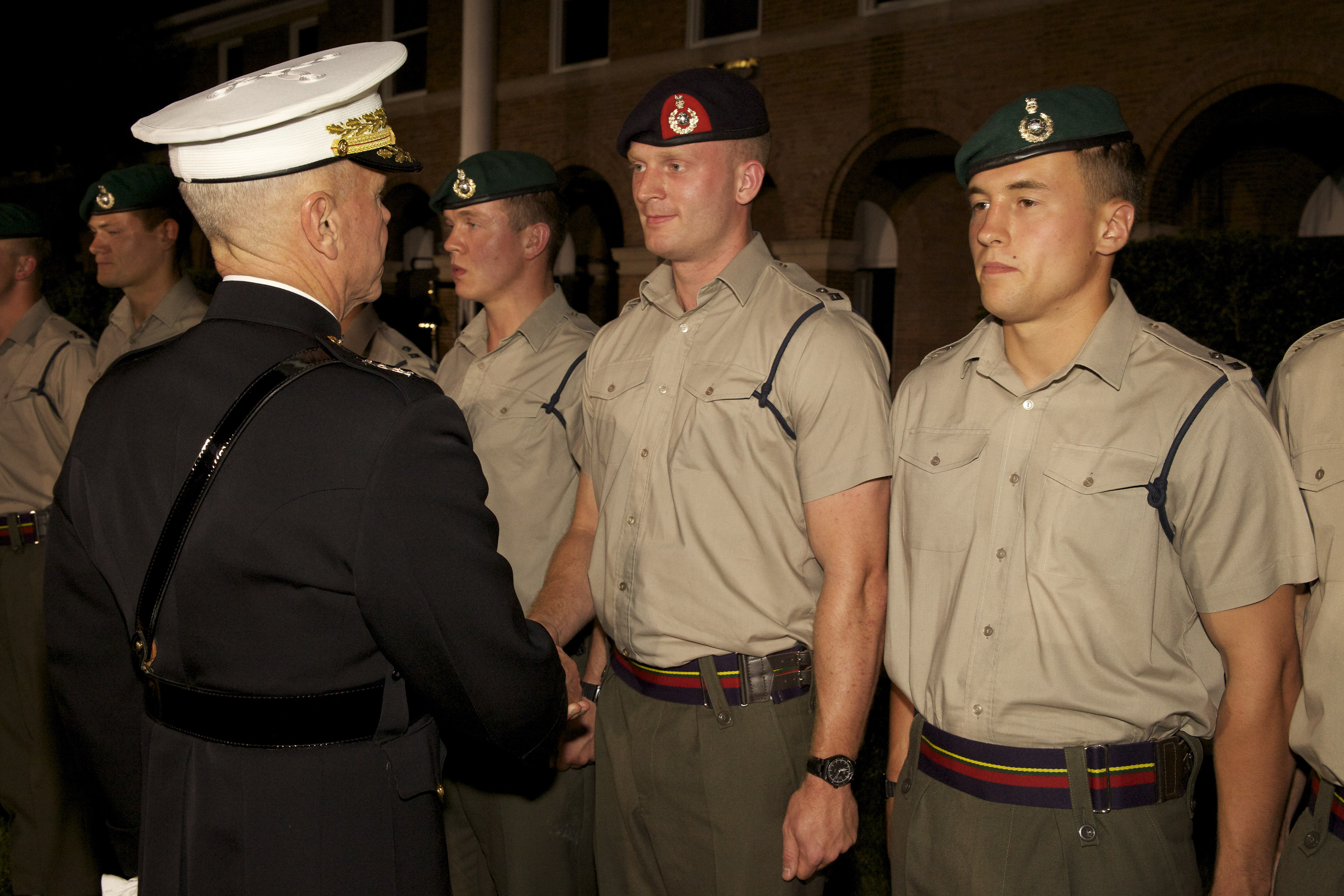
Examples of the green and navy blue berets of the RM, worn with Number 3A dress.

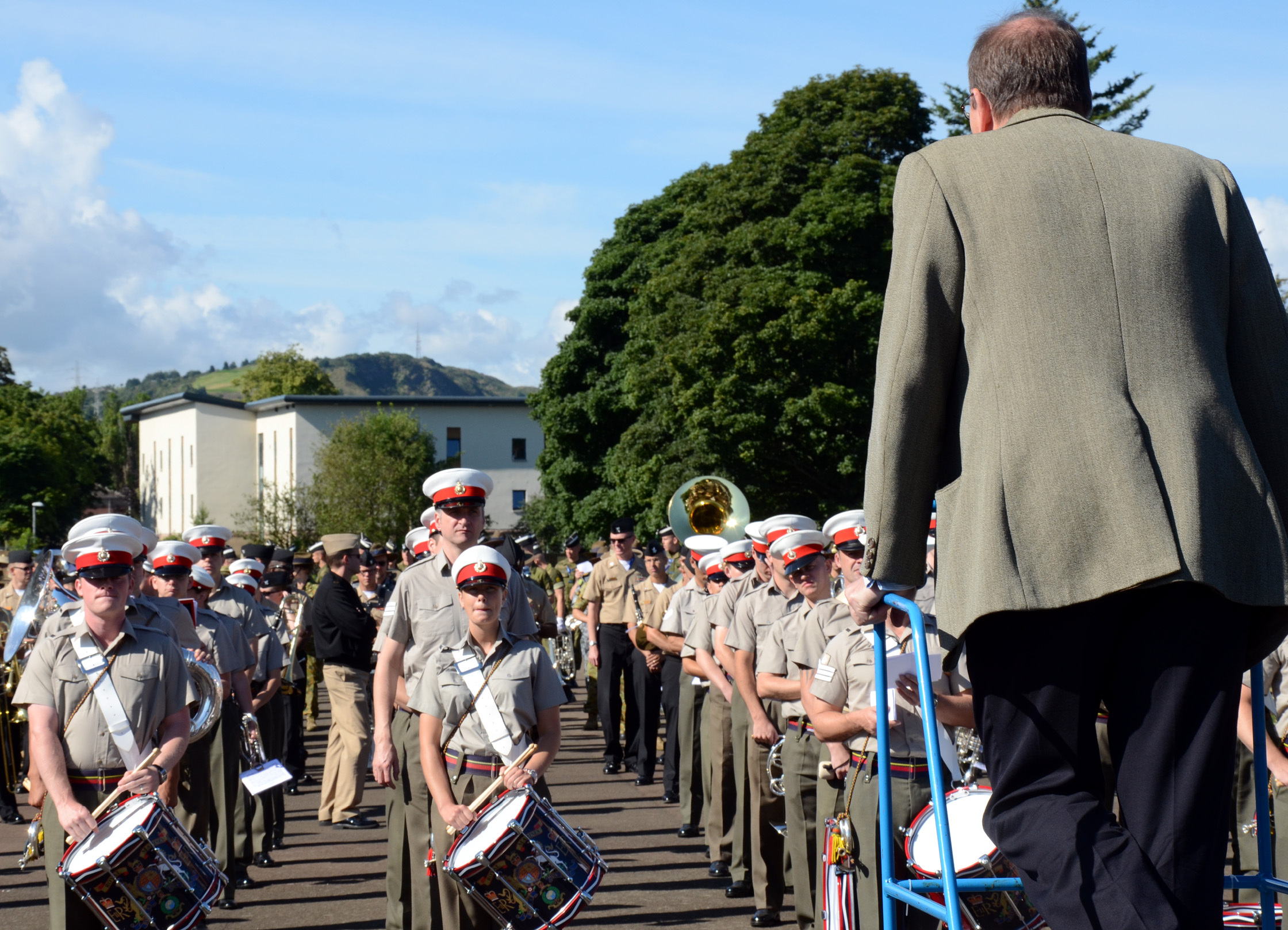
3A dress worn with peaked caps by RMBS personnel.

=== Number 3B General Duty Dress Summer - "Training Rig" ===
This consists of a combat jacket, shirt and trousers worn with combat boots, beret and rank slides, and is worn for day-to-day duties in summer months. On 27 June 2020, the Royal Marines announced they would adopt a new combat uniform from Crye Precision, which included a change from the MTP camouflage to Crye's proprietary MultiCam pattern; the new uniform also included insignia changes to reflect the Royal Marines' history (such as returning to red lettering on a navy blue background) and to indicate that they are part of the wider Royal Navy.

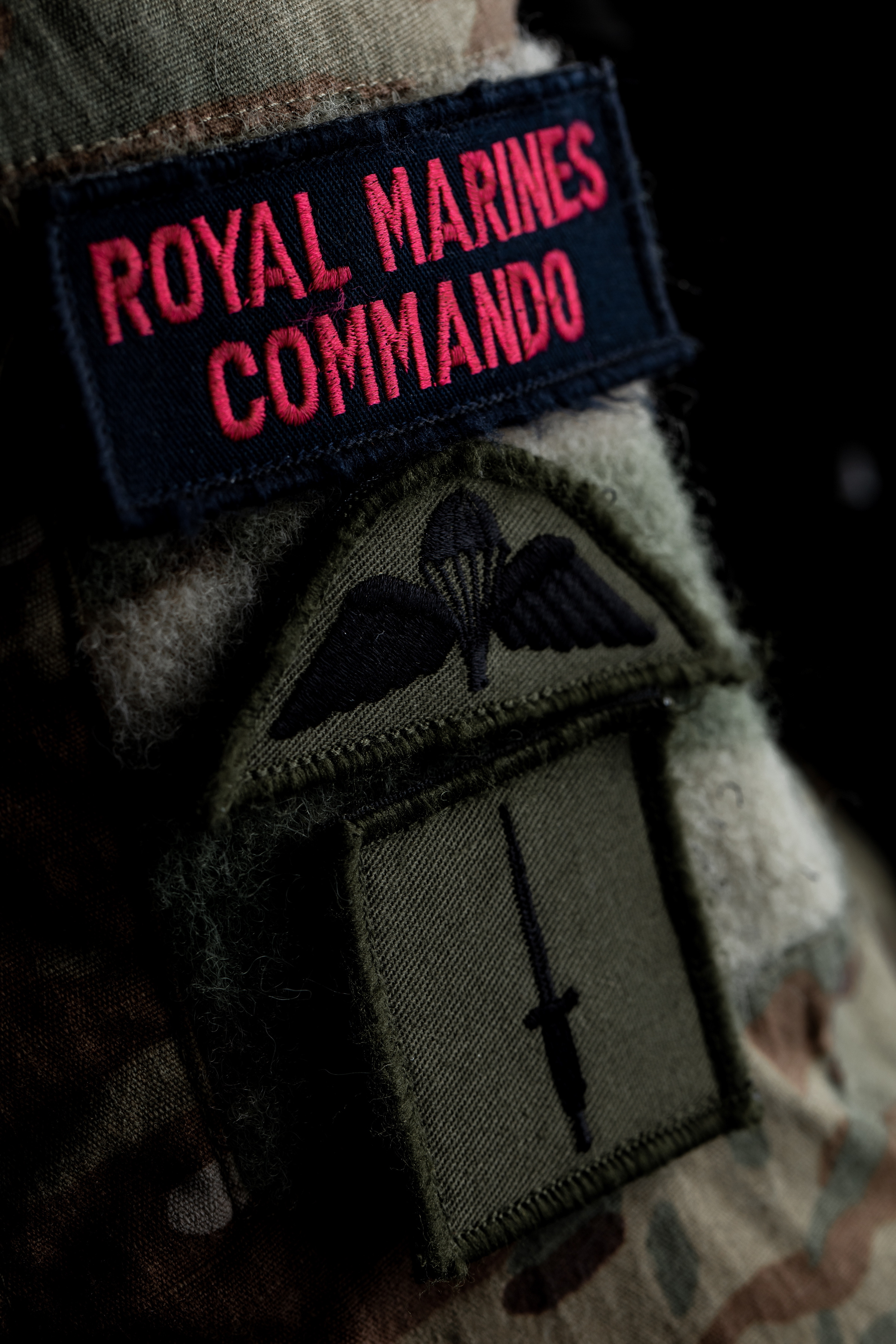
Current version of Royal Marines Commando flash on sleeve of 3B dress.

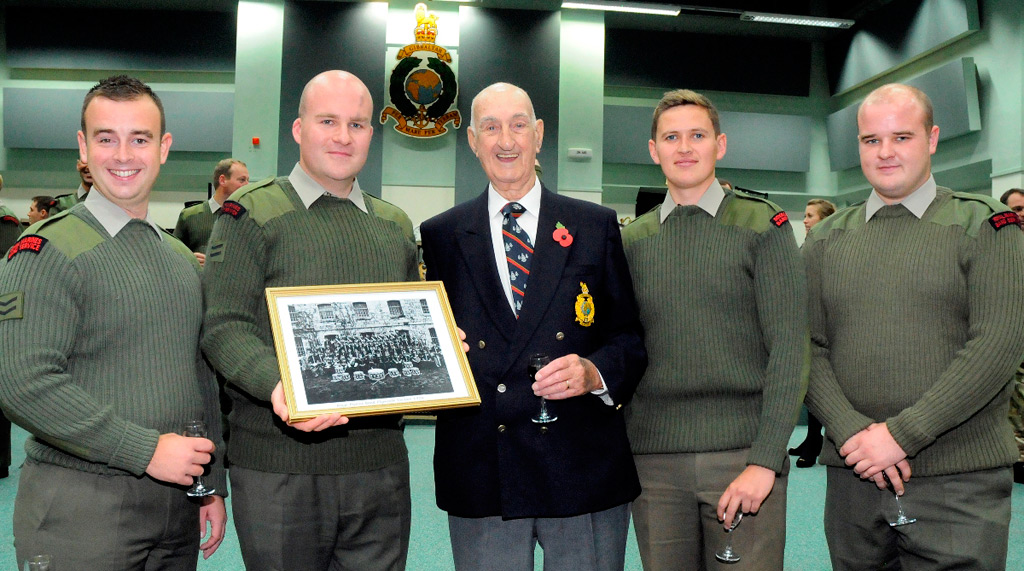
Number 3C dress.

=== Number 3C General Duty Rig - "Half Lovats" (Winter Order) ===
This is the same as 3A dress but with an olive-green woolen pullover; with rank slides for officers and rank arm insignia for other ranks, is worn.

=== Number 3D General Duty Dress - "Winter Training Rig" ===
Similar to 3B dress but worn in the field.

== Obsolete uniforms ==
Disruptive Pattern Material was the combat uniform in use until 2010, when Multi-Terrain Pattern (MTP) uniforms began replacing it.

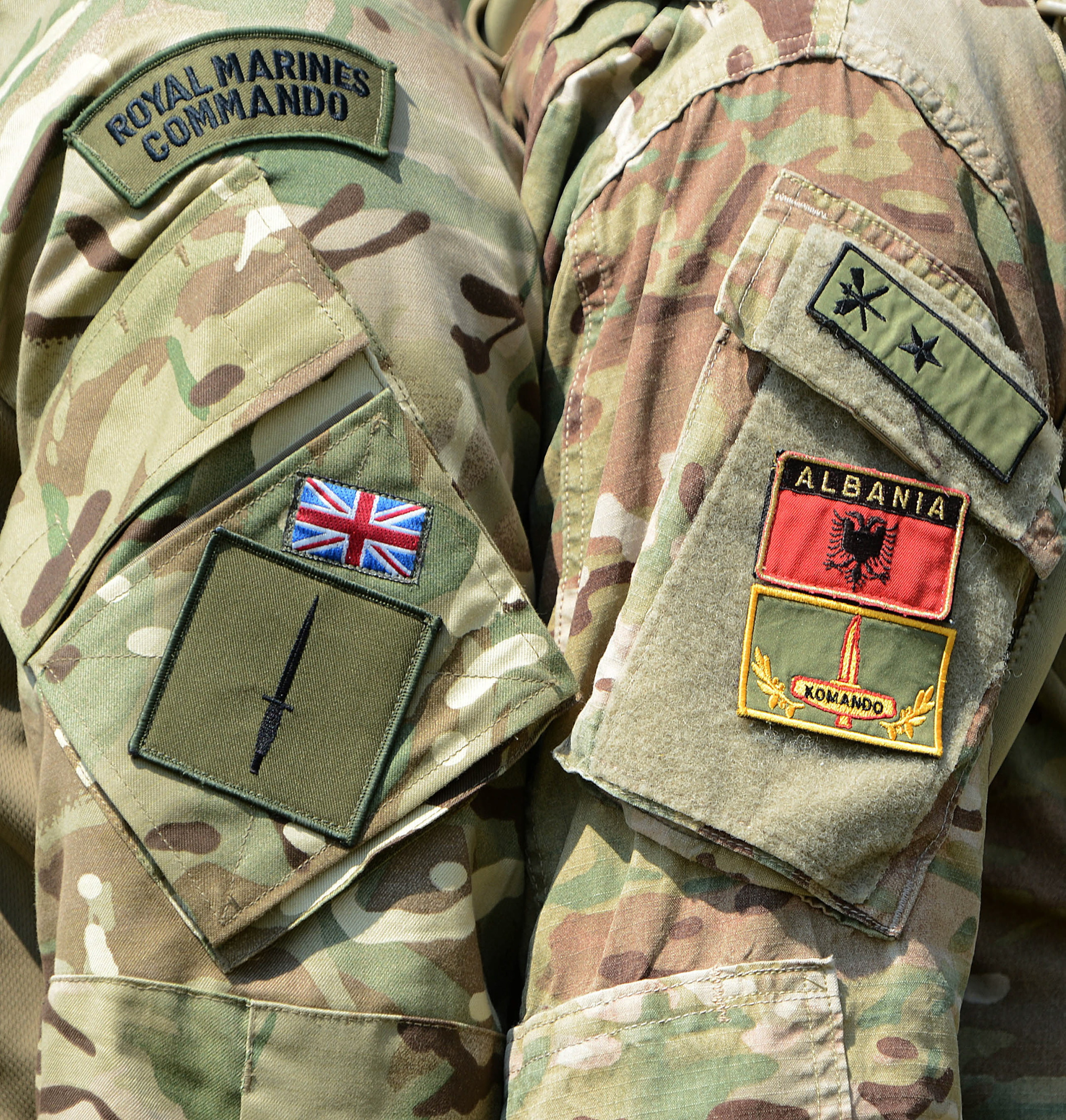
The Royal Marines Commando flash and the 3 Commando Brigade flash worn on a sleeve of a Multi-Terrain Pattern (MTP) uniform.
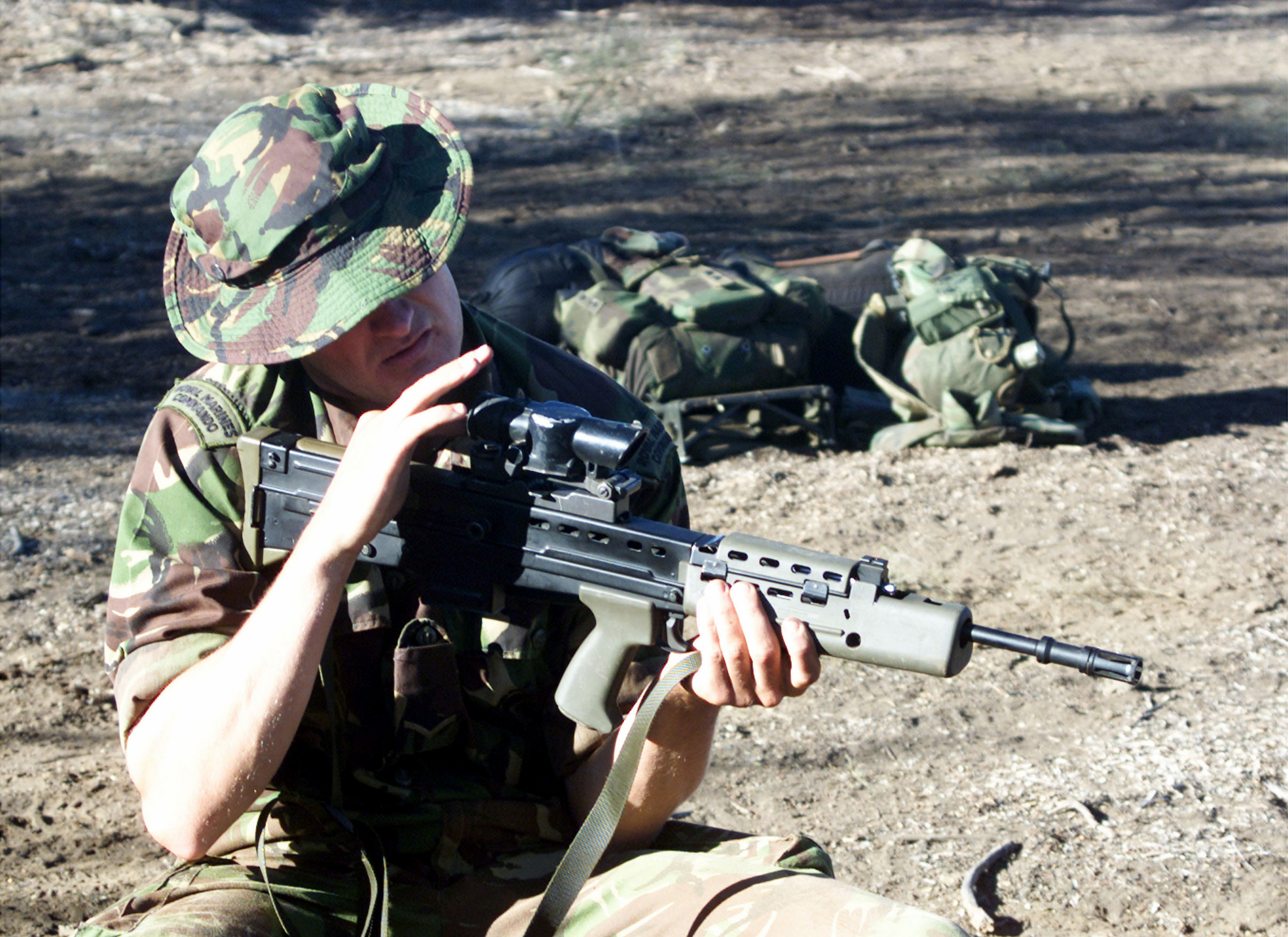
Royal Marines Commando wearing the former No.8: Temperate Combat Dress.

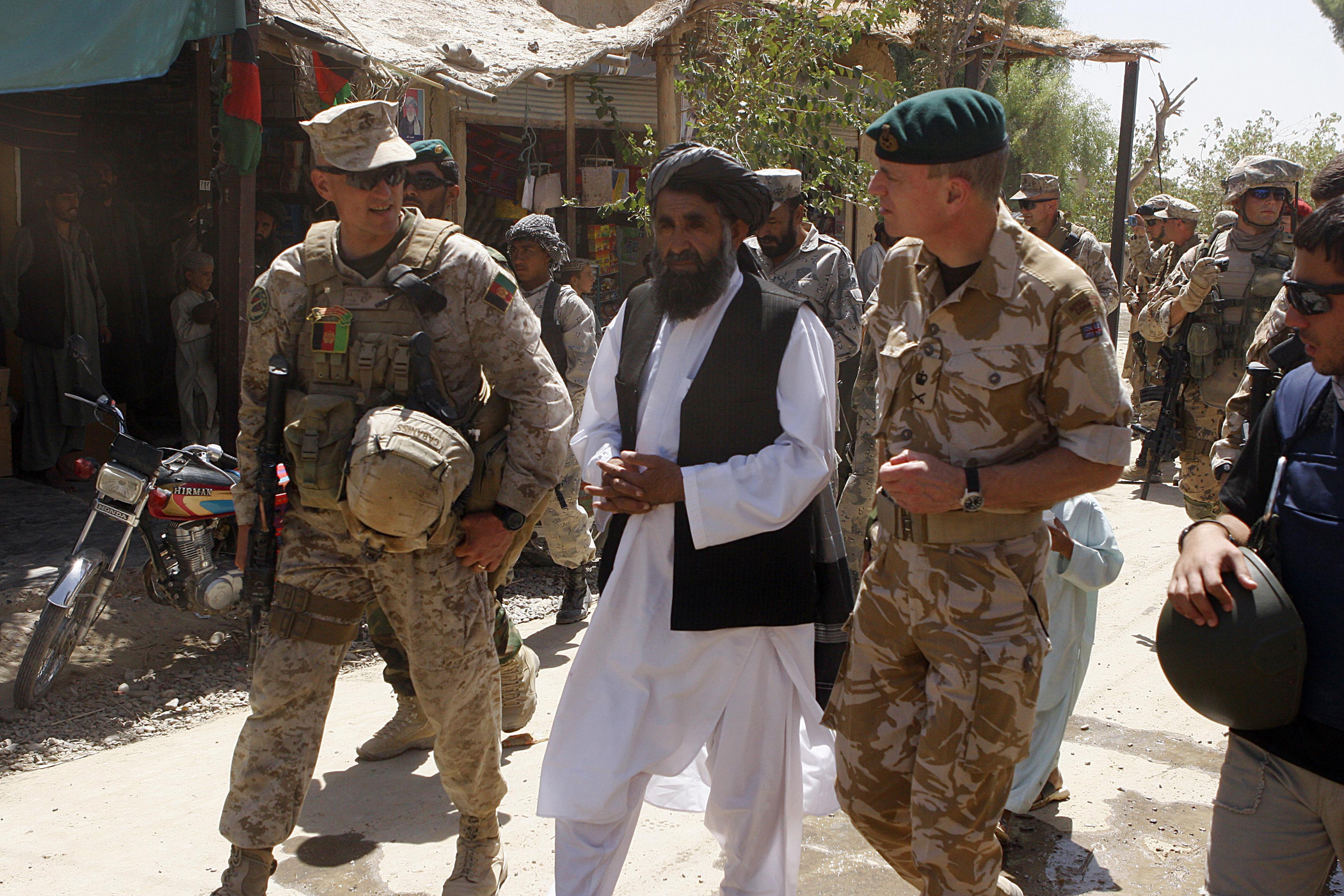
No.5: Desert Combat Dress worn by a Royal Marines officer on the right, in 2009.

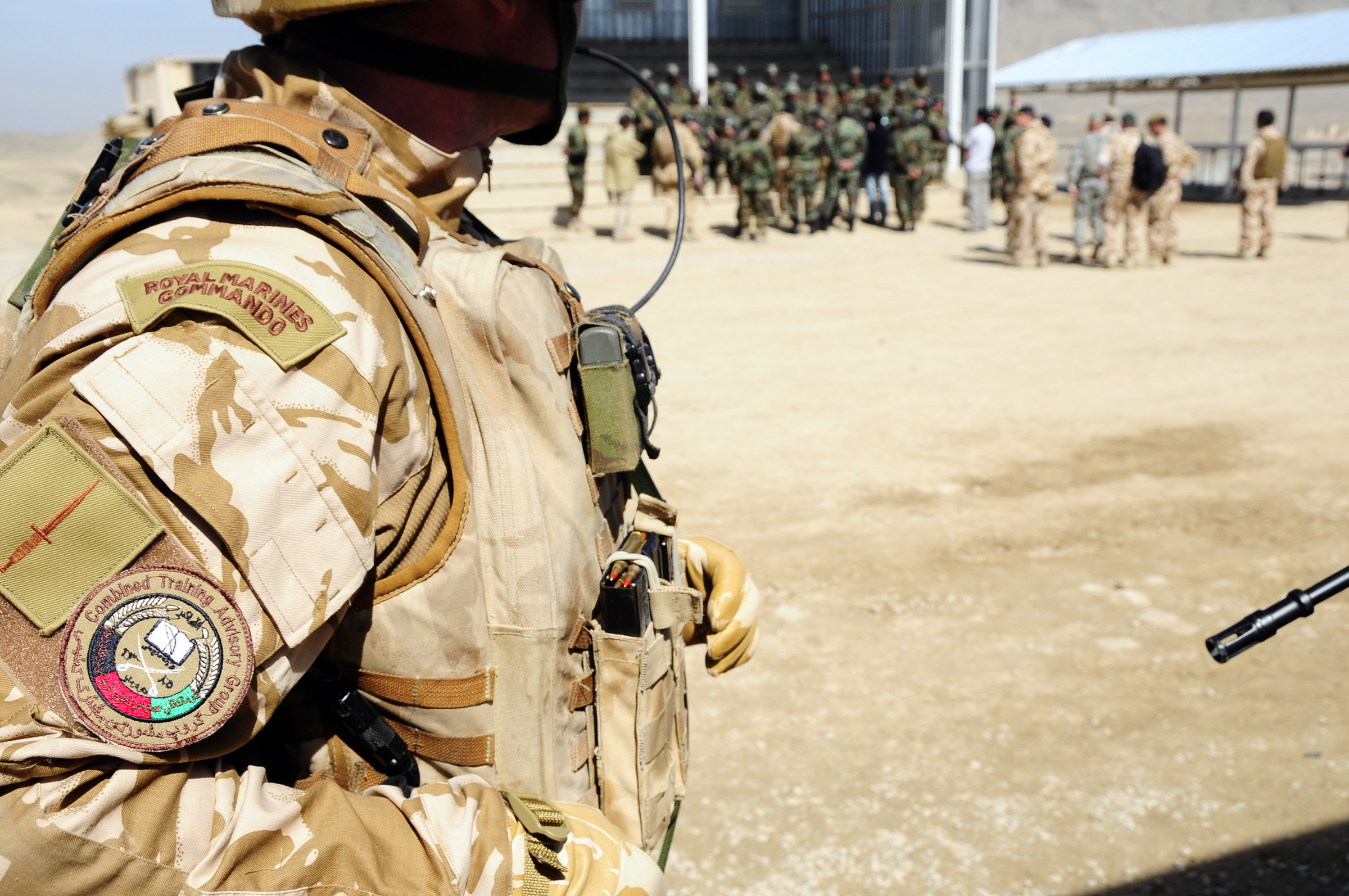
Desert variants of the Royal Marines Commando flash and the 3 Commando Brigade flash worn on Desert Combat Dress.

== See also ==
- Cap comforter
- Royal Marines Band Service#Insignia and uniform
- Royal Marines#Uniforms
- Uniforms of the British Armed Forces

== Sources ==
- Barnes, R.M. (1972). Military Uniforms of Britain & the Empire. Sphere Books London. ISBN 978-0722114063.
- Field, Cyril (1924a). Britain's sea soldiers: a history of the Royal Marines and their predecessors and of their services in action, ashore and afloat, and upon sundry other occasions of moment. Vol. I. Liverpool: The Lyceum Press.
- Field, Cyril (1924b). Britain's sea soldiers: a history of the Royal Marines and their predecessors and of their services in action, ashore and afloat, and upon sundry other occasions of moment. Vol. II. Liverpool: The Lyceum Press.
- Franklin, Carl (Summer 2005). "Uniforms of the Royal Marine Arillery circa 1813" (PDF). The Sheet Anchor - journal of the Royal Marines Historical Society. XXX (1): 3–22 – via rmhistorical.com.
- Fraser, Edward; Carr-Laughton, L. G. (1930). The Royal Marine Artillery 1804-1923, Volume 1 [1804-1859]. London: The Royal United Services Institution. OCLC 4986867.
- Haythornthwaite, Philip (1993). Nelson's Navy. Elite Series #48. Osprey. ISBN 1-85532-334-6.
- Smith, Peter C. (1988). The Royal Marines. A Pictorial History 1664-1987. Spellmount Publishers. ISBN 0-946771-32-4.
- Stadden, Charles C. (1997). Uniforms of the Royal Marines. The Pompadour Gallery. ISBN 0-9519342-2-8.
