= Bonet (surname) =

Bonet is a surname. Notable people with the name include:

- Antoni Bonet i Castellana, Catalan architect
- Antonio Bonet Silvestre, Spanish football player and coach
- Arturo Bonet, Spanish chess master
- Carlos Bonet, Paraguayan footballer
- Carlos Bonnet (1892–1983), also spelled Bonet, Venezuelan composer and orchestra conductor
- Carlos Carmona Bonet, Spanish footballer
- Deni Bonet, American singer/songwriter and multi-instrumentalist
- Ester Bonet, Spanish philologist and linguist
- Francisco Bonet Serrano, Spanish footballer
- Honoré Bonet, Provençal Benedictine
- Jaume Bonet, Catalan football coach
- Jean Bonet, French scholar of Vietnamese
- Jean Pierre François Bonet, a French military commander
- John Bonet, English politician
- Jordi Bonet, Catalan-Canadian artist
- Jose Antonio Ortega Bonet, Cuban businessman
- José Bonet Solves, Spanish mathematician
- José Moré Bonet, Catalan footballer
- Joseph Bonet de Treyches, French politician
- Josep Maria Bonet, Catalan master glassmaker
- Juan Pablo Bonet, Spanish priest and educator
- Juan-Julio Bonet Sugrañes, Catalan chemist
- Kadhja Bonet, American singer
- Lisa Bonet (born 1967), American actress
- Lluís Bonet i Garí, Catalan architect
- Lluís Guillermo Mas Bonet, Majorcan racing cyclist
- Maria del Mar Bonet, Majorcan singer
- María Luisa Bonet, Spanish computer scientist
- Nai Bonet, Vietnamese belly-dancer, singer and film actress
- Nicolas Bonet (c. 1280–1343), French Friar Minor, philosopher, theologian, missionary and bishop of Malta
- Paula Bonet, Spanish book illustrator and urban mural painter
- Pilar Bonet (born 1952), Spanish journalist and writer
- Roberto Bonet, Paraguayan footballer
- Théophile Bonet (1620–1689), Genevan physician and anatomist

== See also ==
- Gaston Bonet-Maury, French Protestant historian
- Bonett, a surname
- Bonetti, a surname
- Bonnet (surname)
- Bennett (name)
