= Bonnet =

A bonnet is a variety of headgear, hat or cap.

Specific types of headgear referred to as "bonnets" may include

== Native American ==
- War bonnet, feathered headgear worn as an earned military decoration by high-ranking Plains Indians

== United Kingdom ==
- Tudor bonnet, worn during Tudor times, but has now become an academic doctoral cap at universities in the UK

=== Scottish ===
- Blue bonnet, a distinctive woollen cap worn by men in Scotland from the 15th to 18th centuries, and its derivations:
  - Feather bonnet, worn by Scottish regiments
  - Glengarry, type of Scottish cap also called a Glengarry bonnet
  - Tam o' Shanter (cap)
    - its military variant the Balmoral bonnet
- See also: Bluebonnet (disambiguation)

Bonnet may also refer to

== Literature ==
- The Daily Bonnet, Mennonite satire website, now known as The Unger Review
- The Best of the Bonnet, a collection of satirical articles by Andrew Unger
- Bonnet ripper, Amish romance novels

== Places ==
- Bonnet, a village in Lemvig Municipality, Denmark
- Bonnet, Meuse, commune in France
- Bonnet Island, Tasmania, Australia

== Transport ==
- Bonnet (wagon), a word for the canvas cover on covered wagons
- Automobiles René Bonnet, defunct French automobile manufacturer
- Bonnet, a word for the hinged engine cover of a motor vehicle in Britain and Commonwealth countries, known as a hood (car) in the United States
- Bonnet (sail), a nautical term for an additional strip of canvas laced to the foot of a sail to increase its area

== Other uses ==
- Bonnet (surname)
- Bonnet, engineering term for part of a valve
- Bonnet, plumbing term for part of an irrigation sprinkler
- Scotch bonnet, a variety of chili pepper
- Bonnet macaque, an Indian monkey
- Bonnet, a minor antagonist from Five Nights at Freddy's: Sister Location
