= Caubeen =

Irish beret

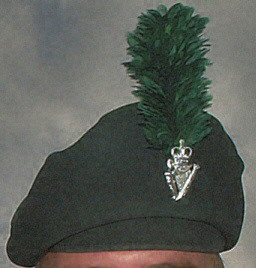
A British army caubeen with a cap badge and green hackle

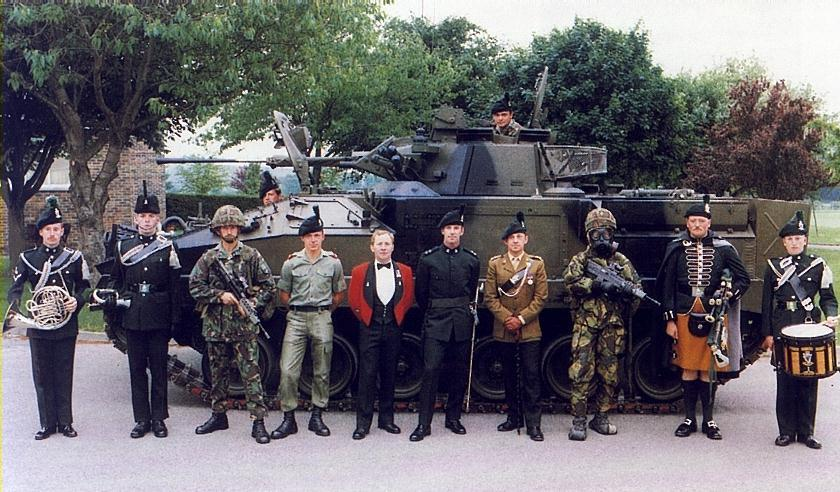
Royal Irish Rangers uniforms

The caubeen (/kɔːˈbiːn/; Irish: cáibín) is an Irish beret, originally worn by 16th-century Irish men. It has been adopted as the head dress of Irish regiments of Commonwealth armies.

== Name ==
The name caubeen dates from late 18th century Irish, and literally means "old hat". It is derived from the Irish word cáibín, meaning "little cape", which itself is a diminutive form of cába, meaning "cape".

The caubeen is fashioned on the cáibín worn by Irish military chieftain Eoghan Rua Ó Néill (1585–1649).

== Military use ==
=== British Army ===
In the British Army, the caubeen is officially known as the "bonnet, Irish, green".

In 1916, the Irish Guards established a pipe band. The pipers' uniform was a mix of standard service dress and bandsman dress, and also included a khaki bonnet, saffron-coloured kilts and green hose. The khaki bonnet was named "caubeen" by the Guards pipers, and was similar to an oversized beret. Some sources have stated the caubeen's similarity to the Scottish tam o' shanter, but the two are different in appearance: the tam o' shanter retaining much more of a 'dinner-plate' effect on the wearer's head, while the caubeen resembles an oversized beret. The two had different quartermaster codes, meaning that the caubeen was not simply a tam o' shanter with the toorie cut off, but a purpose-made article in its own right. In World War II, a number of British army regiments adopted both khaki and rifle-green caubeens as their headdress, replacing the GS cap.

Each regiment was distinguished by the feather hackle in their caps: the Royal Inniskilling Fusiliers wore their traditional grey hackles, the Royal Irish Fusiliers wore their traditional green hackles, the Irish Guards and London Irish Rifles were granted blue hackles, and the Liverpool Irish wore a blue-and-red hackle. The Royal Ulster Rifles did not get a band until 1948, so they did not receive their black hackles until 1947.

In 1937, the London Irish Rifles extended the caubeen's wear to the entire regiment. In World War II, they were the only soldiers to wear the caubeen until 1944, when the 2nd Battalion of the London Irish were serving with the Irish Brigade in Italy. The 2nd Battalion of the Inniskilling Regiment started wearing caubeens made from Italian soldiers' greatcoats in January 1944, and the 6th Battalion of their regiment soon copied them.

In February 1944, the British Army fortuitously made the "general service" cap (a sort of oversized beret made from serge wool) the new standard undress cap. The caubeen passed muster, as the exact form of the GS cap had not been formalized at the time, and their retailoring of the stocks of GS caps went largely unnoticed by the ACI.

In 1947, the wearing of the caubeen was later extended to all of the infantry regiments in the post-war North Irish Brigade, with the Royal Ulster Rifles receiving a black hackle.

The Royal Irish Rangers (formed in 1968 by the amalgamation of the remaining regiments in the North Irish Brigade, The Royal Inniskilling Fusiliers, The Royal Ulster Rifles and The Royal Irish Fusiliers) were granted the wearing of the caubeen with the Irish Fusiliers' green hackle. It continues to be worn by the Royal Irish Regiment, created by the amalgamation of the Royal Irish Rangers and the Ulster Defence Regiment in 1992.

A navy blue caubeen, with hackle of three vertical stripes in colours matching the Royal Signals stable belt, was worn by officers, warrant officers and senior non-commissioned officers of the now disbanded 40 (Ulster) Signal Regiment. WOs and SNCOs wore an anodised metal Royal Signals cap badge, while officers wore an embroidered cap badge. The caubeen was retained by 69 (North Irish Horse) Signal Squadron on resubordination to 32 Signal Regiment. The squadron was subsequently retitled 40 (North Irish Horse) Signal Squadron.

The modern caubeen is worn very high on the off-side (usually the left), which makes it resemble a tilted rimless Balmoral bonnet. It is often made with narrow black tapes that are worn tied neatly in the back; the Canadian version is made with wide tapes. It is traditionally rifle green in colour, and typically worn with a unit insignia (sometimes worn with a short colored plume called a hackle, indicating regimental association) pinned on the off side of the cap.

=== Canadian Army ===
The caubeen remains the headdress for the 2nd Battalion, the Irish Regiment of Canada. It is a Primary Reserve light infantry regiment of the Canadian Army. The regiment was formed in Toronto in 1915 as the 110th Irish Regiment. The caubeen is worn with a green hackle, but not to designate it as a fusilier regiment as in the British Army sense; it was a gift from a commanding officer of the London Irish to the Irish Regiment of Canada during the Battle of Coriano, Italy. The badge and hackle are worn above the right eye, with the left side of the caubeen pulled down – the opposite of the way berets are worn.

=== South African Army ===
The caubeen has been worn by members of the South African Irish Regiment, a Reserve Infantry battalion within the South African National Defence Force.

=== Irish Defence Forces ===
Irish Defence Force Pipers wear a black Glengarry with black trim and tails.

== Other usage ==
The caubeen is also worn by the honour guard of the Division One, Orange County, California branch of the Ancient Order of Hibernians, an Irish Catholic fraternal organization. On their website they remark: "And we wear the green caubeen and carry the pike, the distinctive headgear and weapon of the Irish warriors of old".

In 1938 the Tánaiste, James Dillon, complained about a tax on imported ladies' hats, remarking that Irish ladies would be forced to wear "Connacht caubeens". In response a ladies'-hat factory in Galway declared that, when Dillon next visited the city, they would present him with a suitable "Galway caubeen".

Caubeens are also sold as a women's woolen winter hat by an Irish hat retailer.

== In song ==
The caubeen receives mention in the Irish song "The Wearing of the Green", of which the best-known version was written by Dion Boucicault for his 1864 play Arragh na Pogue, or the Wicklow Wedding, set in County Wicklow during the 1798 rebellion. The following is the second verse of Dion Boucicault's version:

When the law can stop the blades of grass
From growing as they grow,
And when the leaves in summer time
Their verdure dare not show,
Then I will change the colour
I wear in my caubeen,
But till that day I'll stick for aye
To wearing of the green.

The caubeen is also mentioned in the traditional Irish song "Limerick Rake" in a verse concerning the milk from a cow that feeds from the grains of whiskey and beer, in the line, "And the man who would drink it would cock his caubeen."

An old song, still popular in Ireland, is "The Golden Jubilee" (or "Fifty Years Ago"), in which a wife exhorts her husband to take off his hat and put on his "ould caubeen", which he had worn fifty years previously. It was recorded by Connie Foley and Dorothy McManus in the 1940s and later by Sean Dunphy.

Another Irish song referring to the caubeen is "My Old White Caubeen", which The Irish Times reported was sung at a meeting of the RIC in 1901.

== See also ==
- List of hat styles
- Balmoral bonnet
- Bearskin
- Beret
- Feather bonnet
- Glengarry
- Tam o' Shanter (cap)

== General and cited references ==
- Harris, R. G. (1988). The Irish Regiments: A Pictorial History, 1683–1987. Tunbridge Wells, Kent, UK: Nutshell. ISBN 1-871876-00-1. OCLC 24286204.
