= Bonet =

Bonet may refer to:

- Bonet (surname), including a list of people with the name
- Bonet de Lattes (by 1450–after 1514), Jewish physician and astrologer
- Bonet (dessert), a Piedmontese custard dessert
- Bonet River, Co. Leitrim, Ireland
- Casa Bonet (Andorra), a heritage house
- Casa Bonet (Barcelona), Spain, a town house

== See also ==
- Bonett, a surname
- Bonnet (disambiguation)
