= Antonio Bonet =

Antonio Bonet may refer to:

- Antoni Bonet i Castellana (1913–1989), Catalan architect, designer and urban planner
- Antonio Bonet (footballer) (1908–1993), Spanish footballer

== See also ==
- Bonet (disambiguation)
