= Bonnett =

Bonnett is a surname. Notable people with the surname include:

- Robert Bonnett (1916–1994), Australian politician
- Neil Bonnett (1946–1994), American NASCAR driver
- Piedad Bonnett (born 1951), Colombian poet, playwright and novelist

== See also ==
- Bonnet (disambiguation)
