= Glengarry =

Traditional Scots headgear

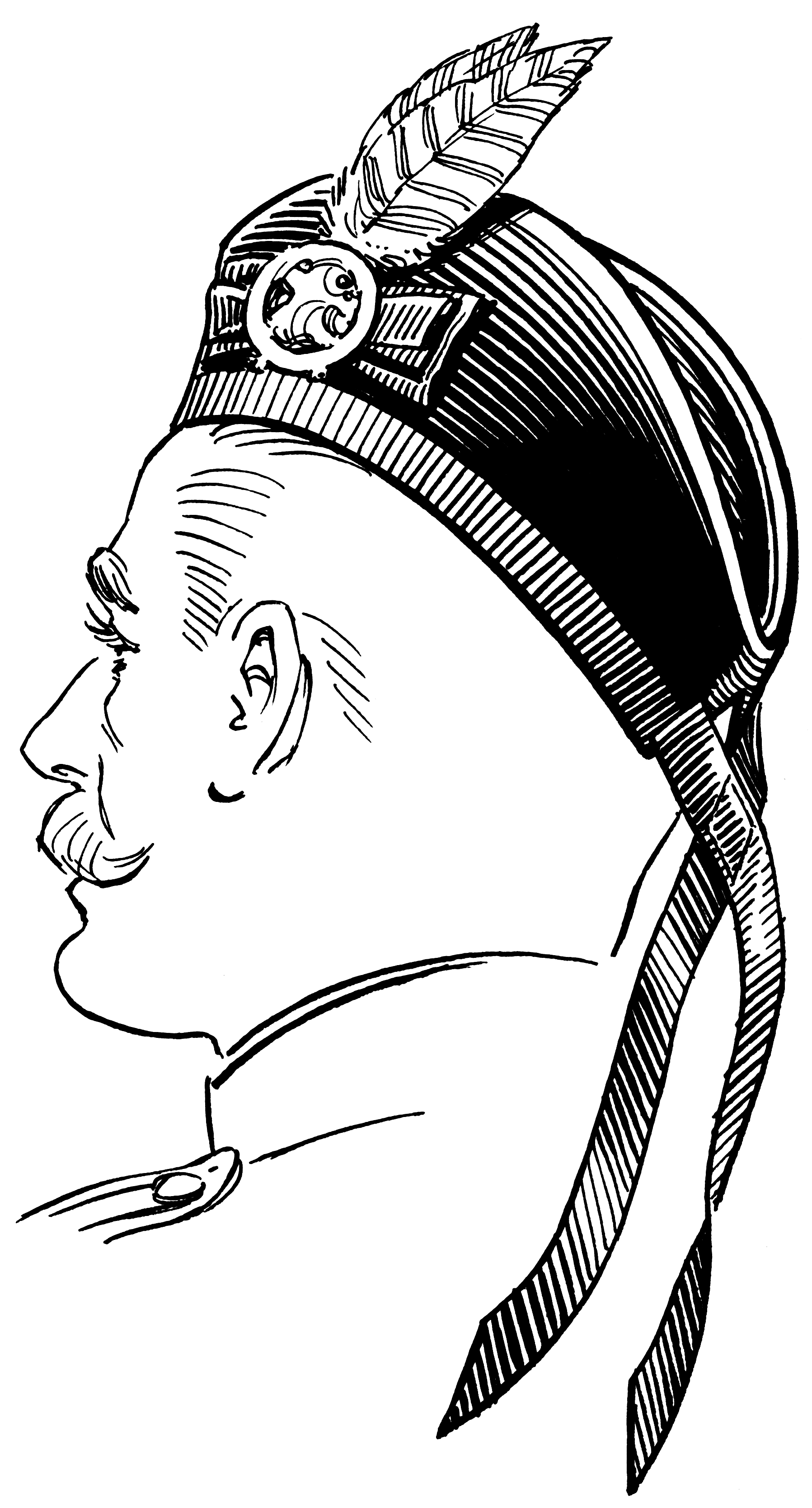
Glengarry bonnet

The Glengarry bonnet is a traditional Scots cap made of thick-milled woollen material, decorated with a toorie on top, frequently a rosette cockade on the left side, and ribbons hanging behind. It is normally worn as part of Scottish military or civilian Highland dress, either formal or informal, as an alternative to the Balmoral bonnet or Tam o' Shanter.

== History ==
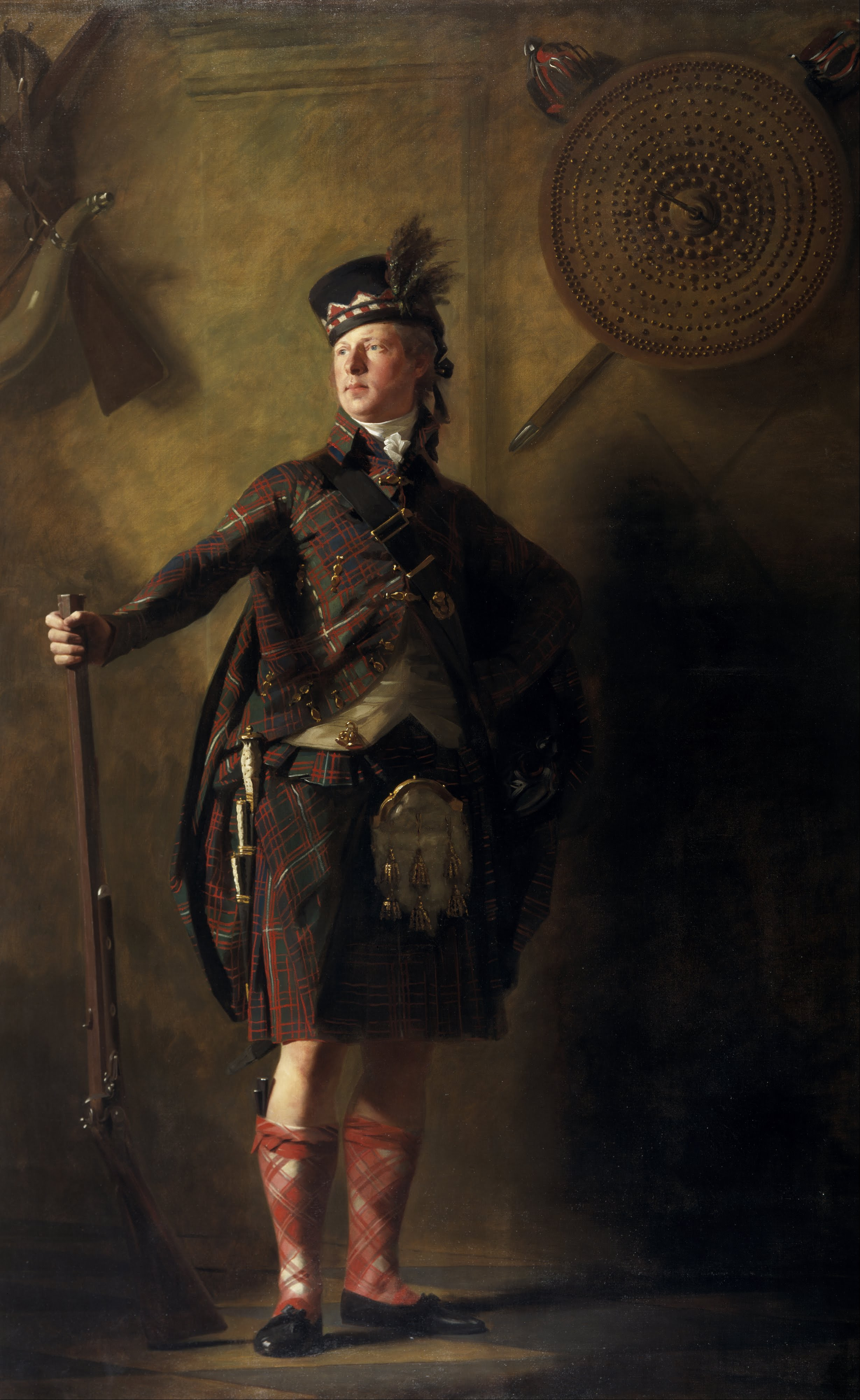
Alexander Ranaldson MacDonell of Glengarry in 1812.

Traditionally, the Glengarry bonnet is said to have first appeared as the head dress of the Glengarry Fencibles when they were formed in 1794 by Alexander Ranaldson MacDonell of Glengarry, of Clan MacDonell of Glengarry. MacDonell, therefore, is sometimes said to have invented the Glengarry – but it is not clear whether early pictures of civilians or Fencible infantry show a true glengarry, capable of being folded flat, or the standard military bonnet of the period merely cocked into a more "fore-and-aft" shape. The first use of the classic, military glengarry may not have been until 1841, when it is said to have been introduced for the pipers of the 79th Foot by the commanding officer, Lieutenant Colonel Lauderdale Maule.

It was only in the 1850s that the Glengarry became characteristic undress headgear of the Scottish regiments of the British Army. By 1860, the Glengarry without a diced border and usually with a feather had been adopted by pipers in all regiments except the 42nd (Black Watch), whose pipers wore the full dress feather bonnet. In 1914, all Scottish infantry regiments were wearing dark blue Glengarries in non-ceremonial orders of dress, except for the Cameronians (Scottish Rifles) who wore them in rifle green, and the Scots Guards, who wore peaked forage caps or khaki service dress caps.

The diced bands on Glengarries were either in red, white and blue for royal regiments or red, white and green for others. The toories on top could be red, royal blue or black, according to regiment. The Black Watch and Queen's Own Cameron Highlanders, however, wore Glengarries without dicing and The 93rd (Sutherland) Highlanders were unique in wearing a simple red and white chequer pattern. This was said to commemorate the stand of the 93rd Sutherland Highlanders at the Battle of Balaclava immortalized as the Thin Red Line.

Between 1868 and 1897, the Glengarry was also worn as an undress cap for most British soldiers until replaced by the short-lived Austrian cap, replaced in turn in 1902 by the Brodrick cap (to which a peak was added to produce the design of cap worn in regimental colours with undress and in khaki with Service Dress at the start of the First World War). When the Austrian-style side cap was revived in 1937 as the Universal Pattern Field Service Cap (used by the British Army in the Second World War), the Dress Regulations for the Army, described it as "similar in shape to the Glengarry".

== Modern wear ==
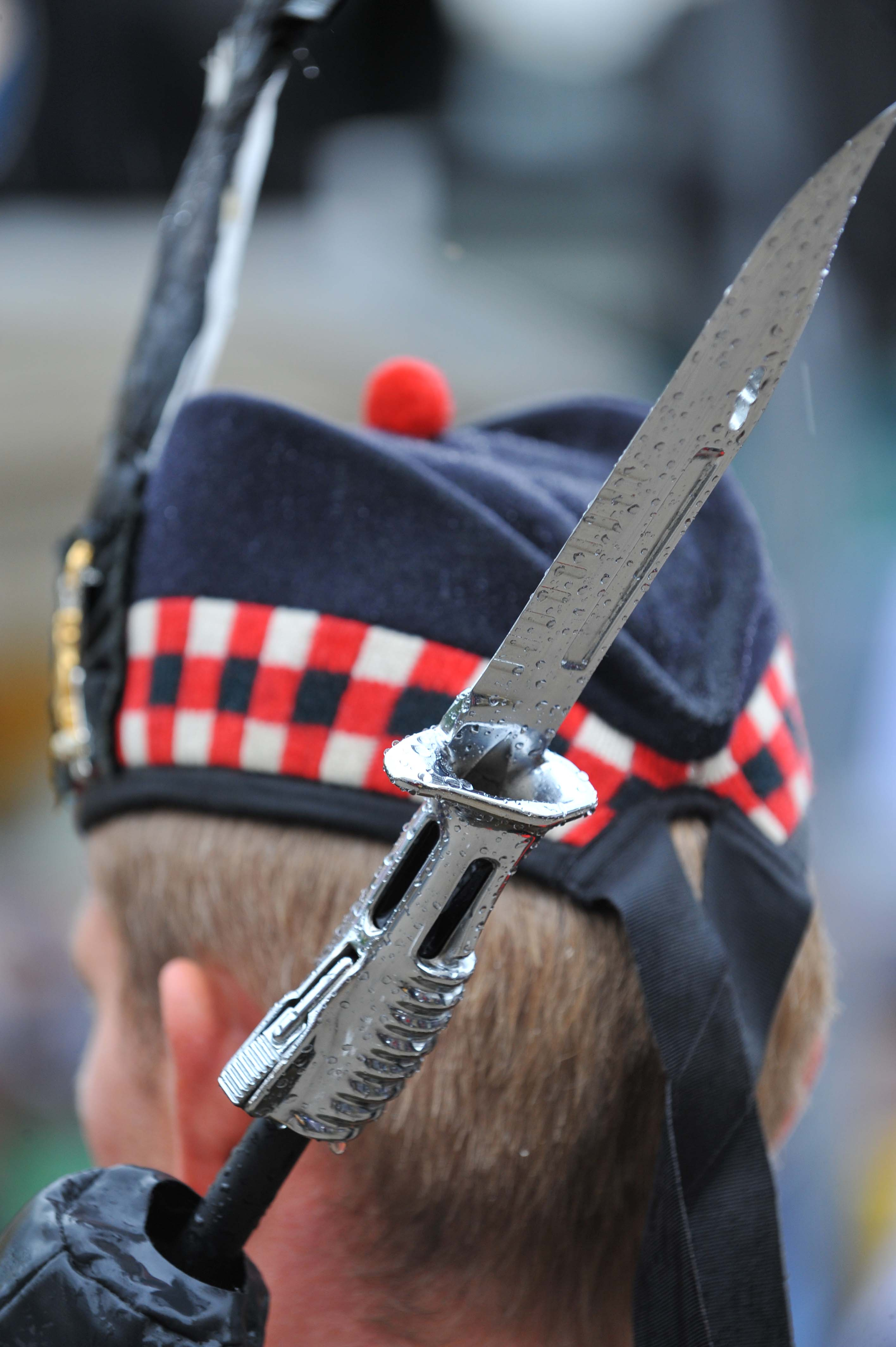
Glengarry worn on parade (Royal Regiment of Scotland, 2011).

The Glengarry continued to be worn in dark blue by all regiments of the Scottish Division up to their final amalgamation into the Royal Regiment of Scotland in 2006. In parade dress, it was worn by all regiments except the Black Watch, who wore the blue Balmoral bonnet, and musicians of some regiments, who wore feather bonnets in full dress. The Black Watch, however, wore a plain blue Glengarry in some orders of dress with trews. The Cameronians (Scottish Rifles) wore a plain rifle green Glengarry up until their disbandment in 1968. The blue Glengarry currently worn by the Royal Regiment of Scotland has red, green and white dicing, a red toorie, black silk cockade and the regimental cap badge surmounted by a blackcock (Tetrao tetrix) feather. This last is a tradition taken from the Royal Scots and King's Own Scottish Borderers. Other Commonwealth military forces that have Scottish and Highland regiments also make use of the Glengarry.

=== Brazilian Marine Corps ===
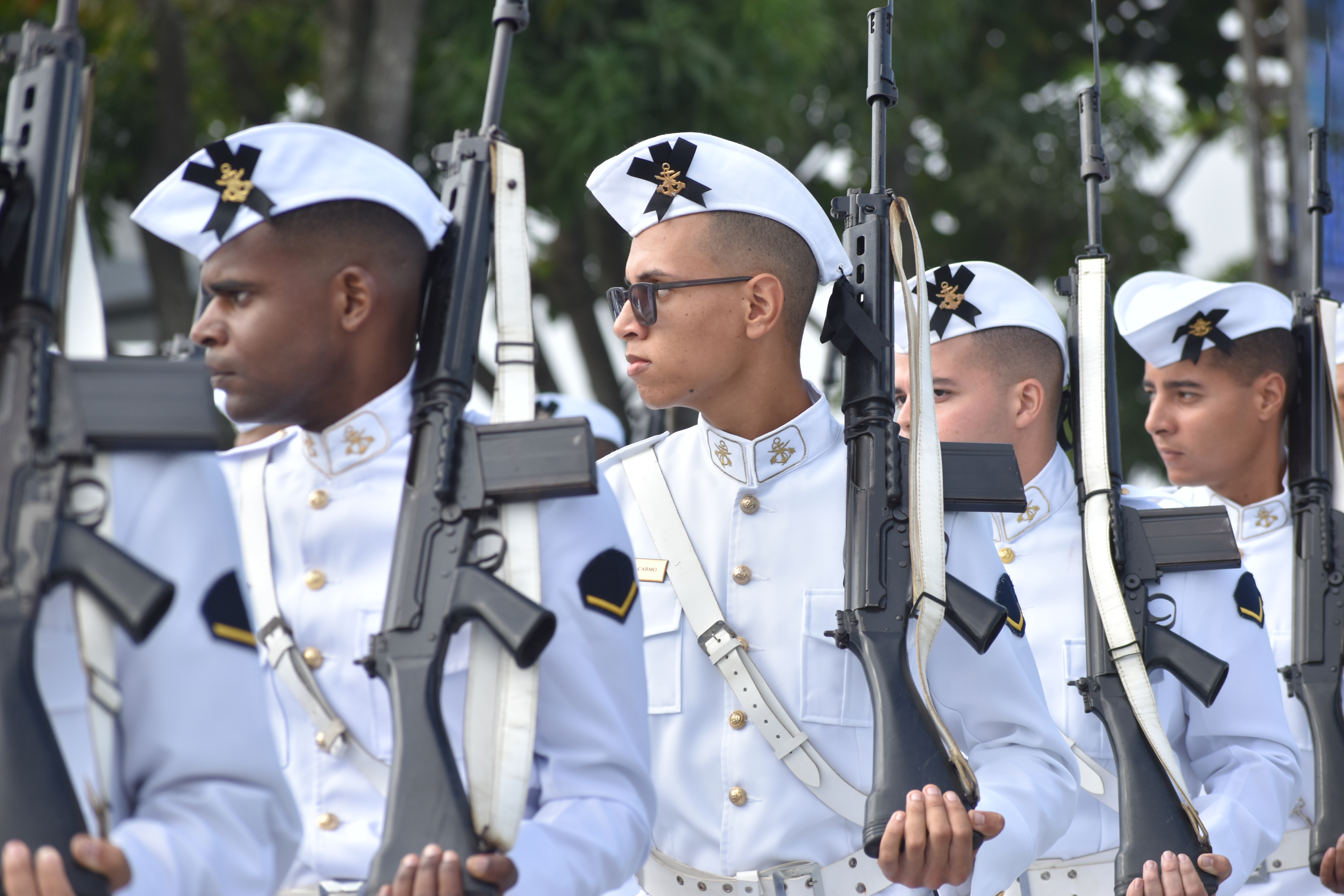
Brazilian Marine Corps on parade wearing coberturas.

The Brazilian Marine Corps wear a cobertura. The traditional ribboned cap of the marines was established by Decree No. 193-B of January 30, 1890, signed during the Provisional Government of Deodoro da Fonseca. The item was conceived by the then commander of the Naval Battalion, Commander Arthur de Azevedo Thompson linked to his own Scottish ancestry. The two loose black ribbon ends at the back are a nod to the traditions of Scottish military clans. This cap is reserved for parade duties.

=== Irish Army ===
The headdress worn by Irish Army's Cavalry Corps is called a Glengarry but is more similar to the caubeen in appearance, than to the Scottish headdress of the same name. It was designed in 1934 for the Cavalry Corps as a more practical headdress than the standard peaked cap in the confines of their armoured cars and tanks. The Glengarry is the same colour as the army's service dress uniform with a black band and two black swallow-tail ribbons at the rear. The cap badge is worn over the left eye. Officers in the RDF wear a similar Glengarry but with green band and ribbons as part of their service dress uniform. Army pipers and drummers wear a black Glengarry with a saffron band and ribbons and a dark green feather hackle.

== Civilian wear ==
The Glengarry is worn by male members of staff at the Palace of Holyroodhouse, the King's official residence in Scotland.

The Glengarry is also commonly worn by civilians, notably civilian pipe bands, but can be considered an appropriate hat worn by any man with Highland casual dress or day wear. In this context, it most often has a red toorie. In pipe bands, women often also wear the Glengarry.

The Glengarry is the headdress stipulated in dress regulations for officers of the Boys' Brigade; namely warrant officers, lieutenants and brevet captains.

== Police use of diced band ==
In 1932 Percy Sillitoe, the Chief Constable of the City of Glasgow Police, abolished the traditional custodian helmet and added a new feature to the peaked caps worn by his police officers. This new feature was a black and white chequered cap band based on the dicings seen on the Glengarry headdress of the Scottish regiments. The diced band, popularly known as the Sillitoe tartan, later spread to police forces in Australia, New Zealand, and the rest of the United Kingdom, as well as to some other parts of the world, notably Chicago.

== Method of wearing ==
The correct method of wearing the Glengarry has changed since the end of the Second World War. Prior to 1945, Glengarries were generally worn steeply angled, with the right side of the cap worn low, often touching the ear, and the side with the capbadge higher on the head. The trend since the end of the war has been to wear the Glengarry level on the head, with the point directly in the middle.

== See also ==
- List of hat styles
