= Tam o' shanter (cap) =

Traditional Scottish bonnet

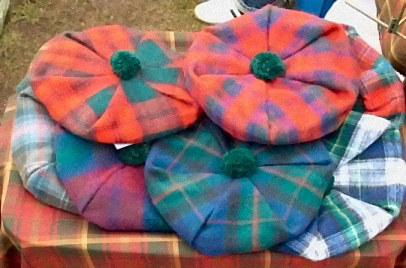
Tartan tam o' shanters.

A tam o' shanter (in the British military often abbreviated to ToS) or "tammie" is a name given to the traditional Scottish bonnet worn by men. The name derives from Tam o' Shanter, the eponymous hero of the 1790 Robert Burns poem.

== Description ==
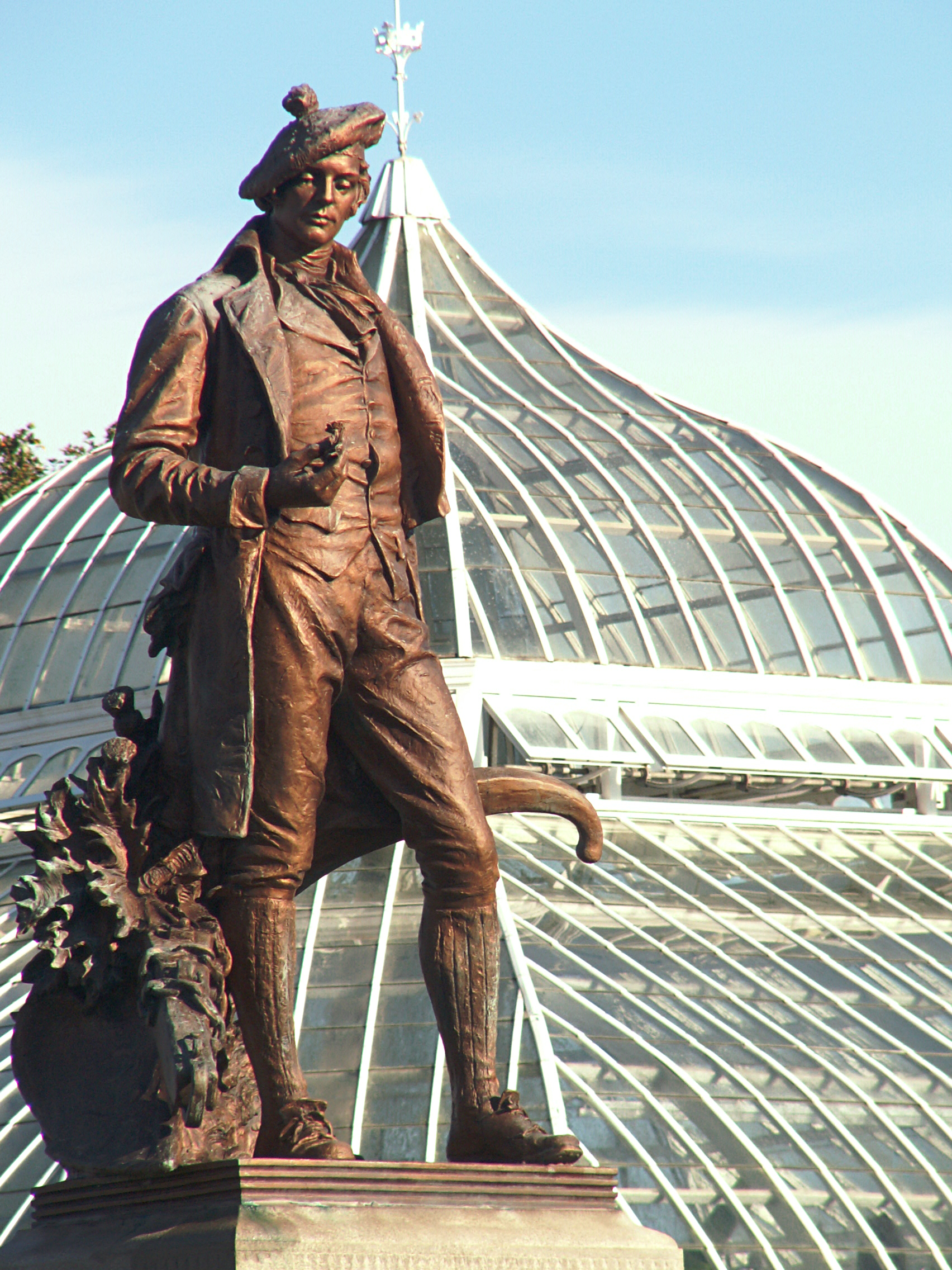
Statue of Burns wearing a tam o' shanter.

The tam o' shanter is a flat bonnet, originally made of wool hand-knitted in one piece, stretched on a wooden disc to give the distinctive flat shape, and subsequently felted. The earliest forms of these caps, known as a blue bonnet from their typical colour, were made by bonnet-makers in Scotland. By the year 1599 five bonnet-makers' guilds had formed in cities around the country: Edinburgh, Aberdeen, Perth, Stirling and Glasgow. At the end of the 16th century, it was said that the Scottish caps were the normal fashion of men and servants, and they remained so throughout the 17th century.

Similar in outline to the various types of flat bonnet common in northwestern Europe during the 16th century, the later tam o' shanter is distinguished by the woollen ball or toorie decorating the centre of the crown; the name itself did not enter common usage until the early 19th century, subsequent to the popularity of Burns' poem. The term came to denote a hat, usually associated with Scottish military regiments, derived from the old bonnet, along with the Glengarry and the Balmoral bonnets. The Balmoral was sometimes simply described as synonymous with the tam o' shanter.

Before the introduction of inexpensive synthetic dyes in the mid-19th century, the Scottish knitted bonnet was made only in colours easily available from natural dyes, particularly woad or indigo (hence "blue bonnet"). Since that time the tam o' shanter has been produced in a wider range of fabrics, such as serge, as single colours, as well as tartan. Women have also adopted a form of this hat, known as a "tammy" or "tam".

== Military use ==
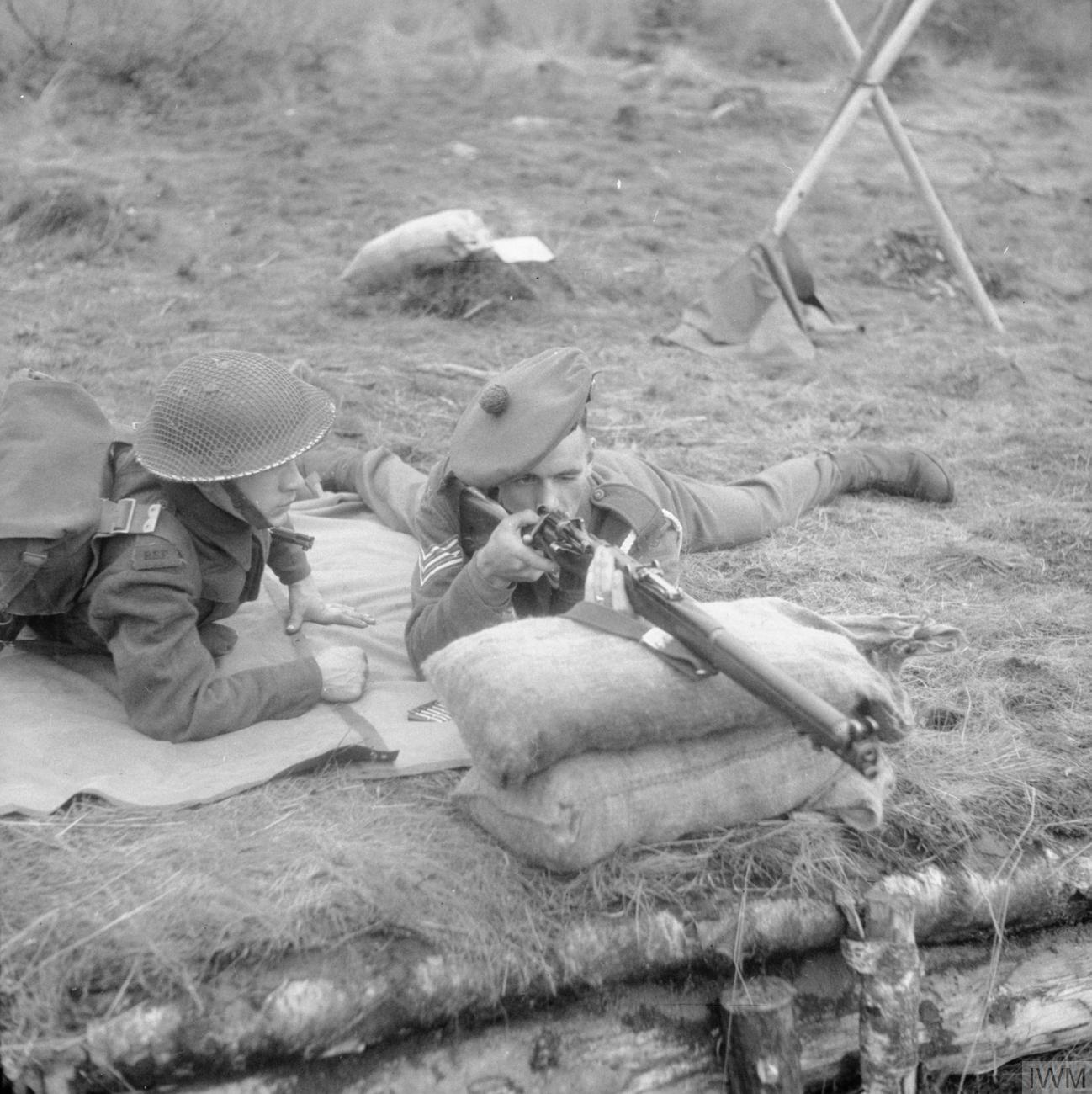
A sergeant of the Royal Scots Fusiliers (right) wearing a tam o' shanter in 1942.

In the First World War, a khaki Balmoral bonnet was introduced in 1915 for wear in the trenches by Scottish infantry serving on the Western Front. This came to be known as the "bonnet, tam o' shanter", later abbreviated among military personnel to "ToS". It replaced the Glengarry – which was the regulation bonnet worn by Scottish troops with khaki field dress at the start of the war. Originally knitted, the military tam o' shanter subsequently came to be constructed from separate pieces of khaki serge cloth.

Today, the Royal Regiment of Scotland and Scottish regiments of the Canadian Army continue to wear the ToS as undress and working headgear. The various battalions of the Royal Regiment of Scotland identify themselves by wearing distinctive coloured hackles on their bonnets. The Black Watch, 3rd Battalion, Royal Regiment of Scotland wear a red hackle in their ToS, as do soldiers of The Black Watch of Canada.

Some regiments of the Canadian Army wear different coloured toories: the Royal Highland Fusiliers of Canada have traditionally worn dark green; The North Nova Scotia Highlanders wore red toories during the Second World War and continues to do as does the 48th Highlander’s of Canada; and the Stormont, Dundas and Glengarry Highlanders wore blue. Most regiments, however, wear a khaki toorie, matching the bonnet. In many Canadian regiments it is traditional for soldiers to wear a ToS, while officers (and in some cases senior non-commissioned officers) wear the balmorals instead. The tam o'shanter is generally in rough khaki wool, while the balmoral is in finer quality doe-skin of a pale tan or grey shade.

The tam o' shanter was traditionally worn by various regiments of the Australian Army which have a Scottish connection. B (Scottish) Company 5th/6th Battalion, Royal Victoria Regiment, wore both a khaki and blue bonnet at various stages. It appears this has now been superseded by the Glengarry.

== Police bands ==
Hong Kong Police Band bagpipes section wears a black and red version.

== Academic tam ==
The velvet academic tam worn with a tassel is part of the ceremonial dress used at many universities to distinguish those holding a doctoral degree (e.g. Ph.D., Ed.D.) from those holding other academic degrees. Although referred to as a "tam", the academic tam derives from the Tudor bonnet rather than the Scottish tam o' shanter, and the cap is constructed of two pieces of either six- or eight-pointed cuts of fabric attached to a headband rather than the pie segments used in a tam o' shanter.

== Fashion tam ==
The tam, or tam cap, became a fashionable women's accessory from the early 1920s and was derived from the tam o' shanter. It followed the trends for closer fitting hats and for borrowing from men's fashion.

== See also ==
- Balmoral bonnet
- Beret
- Bonnet (disambiguation)
- Caubeen
- Flat cap
- Glengarry
- List of hat styles
- Scotch bonnet
