= Bluebonnet =

A blue bonnet is a type of soft woollen hat that was the customary working wear of Scottish labourers and farmers.

Bluebonnet or blue bonnet may also refer to:

- The Blue Bonnet, a 1919 American silent drama film directed by Louis Chaudet
- Blue Bonnet (brand), a brand of margarine and other bread spreads and baking fats
- Blue Bonnet Court, a historic motel in north-central Austin, Texas, U.S.
- Blue Bonnets (raceway), a horse racing track and casino in Montreal, Quebec, Canada
- "Blue Bonnets O'er the Border", a regimental march of the King's Own Scottish Borderers
- Bluebonnet (bird), two species of Australian parrots in the genus Northiella
- Bluebonnet (plant), a name given to any number of blue-flowered species of the genus Lupinus
- Bluebonnet Bowl, an American college football bowl game played annually 1959–1987
- Bluebonnet Electric Cooperative, an electric utility cooperative headquartered in Bastrop, Texas, U.S.
- Bluebonnet Ordnance Plant, a former munitions plant near McGregor, Texas, U.S.
- Bluebonnet Swamp Nature Center, a nature conservation park in Baton Rouge, Louisiana, U.S.
