= Bonett =

Bonett or Bonétt is a surname. Notable people with the surname include:

- Chris Bonett, Maltese politician
- Emery Bonett (1906–1995), pen name of Felicity Winifred Carter, English author and playwright
- John Bonett (1906–1989), pen name of John Hubert Arthur Coulson, English author
- Shaun Bonétt (born 1971), Australian property developer

== See also ==
- Bonet (surname)
- Bonnett, a surname
