= José Bonet Solves =

Spanish mathematician

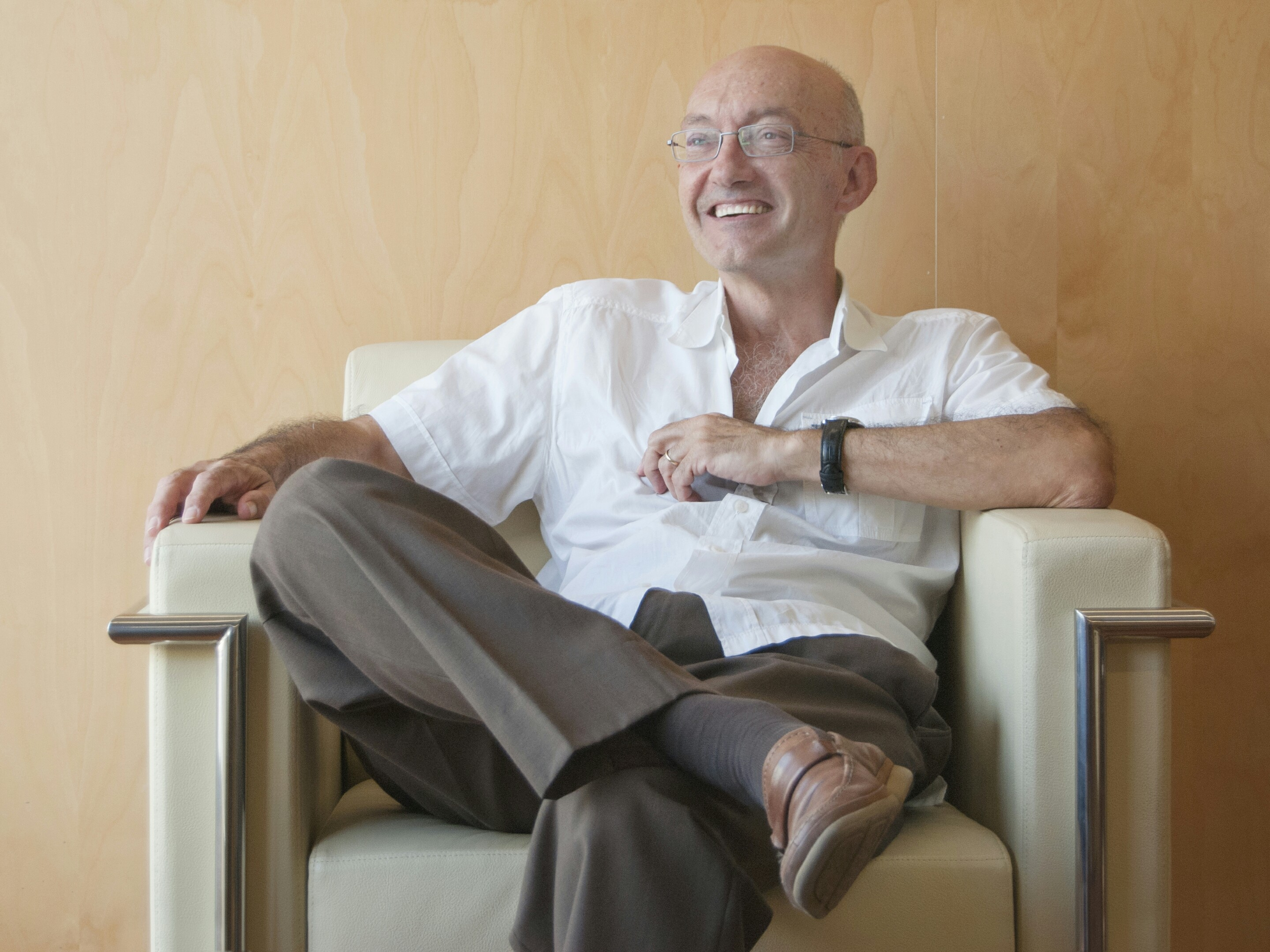
- José Bonet Solves
- Born: June 18, 1955 (age 71); Valencia
- Education: Universitat de València
- Scientific career
- Fields: Mathematics
- Thesis: Representación de Espacios de Funciones con Valores Vectoriales (1980)
- Doctoral advisor: Manuel Valdivia Ureña
- Website: jbonet.webs.upv.es

José Bonet Solves (Valencia, June 18, 1955) is a Spanish mathematician specialist in functional analysis and its applications to complex analysis and linear partial differential equations.

== Academic biography ==
José Bonet graduated in Mathematics at the University of Valencia in 1977. In 1980 he defended his Ph.D. thesis in that University under the supervision of Professor Manuel Valdivia Ureña. Bonet was assistant in the University of Valencia from 1977 to 1983; between 1983 and 1987 he was associate professor, in the Polytechnic University of Valencia. Since 1987, Bonet is full professor in the Applied Mathematics Department at the Polytechnic University of Valencia. He was also Visiting Professor in the University of Paderborn, Germany in 1989 and in 2002. He had an Alexander Von Humboldt fellowship in Düsseldorf (1994), Paderborn (1995, 2008) and Eichstätt (2008, 2013, 2017); Germany.

He has been the Director of the institute of mathematics Instituto Universitario de Matemática Pura y Aplicada IUMPA at the Polytechnic University of Valencia from 2004 until November 2016.

José Bonet has been Principal Investigator of several research projects of the Spanish Ministry of Education since 1988, integrated actions between Spain and Germany and between Spain and Italy, and of the project of excellence in research PROMETEO of the Generalitat Valenciana (2008–2012, 2013–2016, and 2017–2021). He also organized several international meetings on functional analysis.

He supervised fifteen Ph.D. thesis.

== Publications ==
- Coauthor of the book “Barrelled Locally Convex Spaces” published by North-Holland in 1987.
- Coeditor of the books “Progress in Functional Analysis” and “Recent Progress in Functional Analysis”, published by North-Holland in 1992 and 2002, respectively. *Coeditor of the book “Topics in Complex Analysis and Operator Theory” published by the American Mathematical Society in 2012.
- Author of more than 200 research papers published in international mathematics journals since 1980, like Advances in Mathematics, Journal of Functional Analysis, Transactions of the American Mathematical Society, Journal of the London Mathematical Society, Mathematische Zeitschrift, Studia Mathematica, etc. Most of this papers have been written in collaboration with researchers from Germany, the United States, Italy, Finland, Poland, etc. The publications received several citations.
- Editor of the journals RACSAM, Journal of Mathematical Analysis and Applications, Mediterranean Journal of Mathematics, Banach Journal of Mathematical Analysis y Functiones et Approximatio Commentarii Mathematici.

== Honours ==
- Corresponding member of the Société Royale des Sciences de Liège Belgium since 1992.
- Corresponding member of the Spanish Royal Academy of Sciences since 1994.
- Full member of the Spanish Royal Academy of Sciences, elected since 2005. Entrance lecture presented on April 23, 2008.
- Medal of the Real Sociedad Matemática Española in 2016.
- President of the Mathematics Section of the Spanish Royal Academy of Sciences from 2018 to 2024.
- General Secretary of the Spanish Royal Academy of Sciences since 2024.

=== Awards ===
- First National Prize for Termination of University Studies in Mathematics, Primer Premio Nacional de Terminación de Estudios en Matemáticas of the Spanish Ministry of Education in 1977.
- Premio Extraordinario de Licenciatura (Prize for the Graduation) in Mathematics of the University of Valencia in 1978.
- Premio Extraordinario de Doctorado (Prize for the Doctor Thesis) in Mathematics of the University of Valencia in 1980.
