= Josep Maria Bonet =

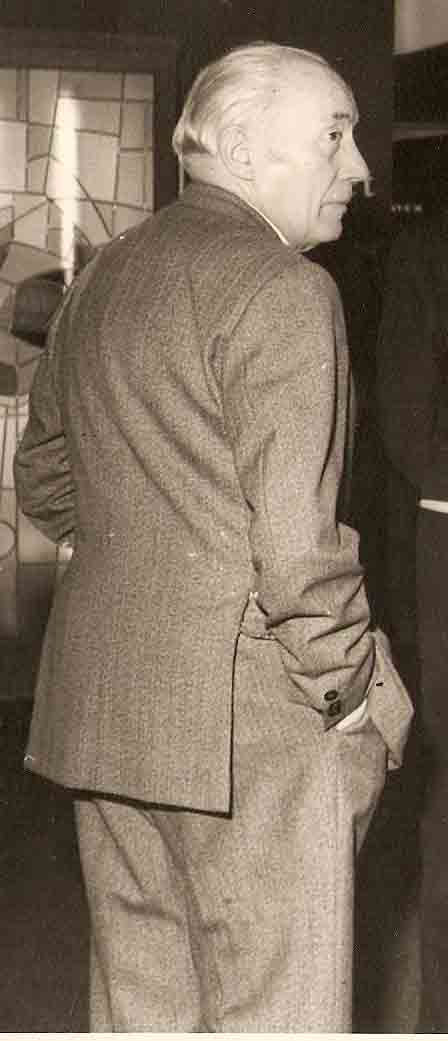
Josep Maria Bonet

Josep Maria Bonet (1903, La Seu d'Urgell – 1988, Barcelona) was a Catalan master glassmaker in the first half of the twentieth century. Along with his brother, Xavier Bonet (1897–1985), he founded the studio that bears his name which is still active. The family has roots in the ancient town of Arsèguel in Alt Urgell. From a young age, he studied at the Barcelona Llotja school, where he excelled in drawing and befriended the artists who later collaborated with him in the field of stained glass, Montsardà, Labarta, Comal, and continued to learn the craft workshop at the workshop of the glassmaker Oriach, where his brother was already working.

Together, they established the workshop at No. 6 on the street Asturias in Gracia which is still present. He first worked with Darius Vilas, artist and Josep Maria Pericas, architect on stained glass of the parish of Carmen de Barcelona, on the church of Sant Joan de Reus, and on the windows of the crypt of the Sagrada Familia in Barcelona. The workshop worked on making leaded windows in restoration and glass etchings. The workshop was nationalized during the civil war and both JMBonet and Xavier Bonet engaged in other professional activities. At the end of the war, the workshop focused on the reconstruction of temples destroyed during the civil war

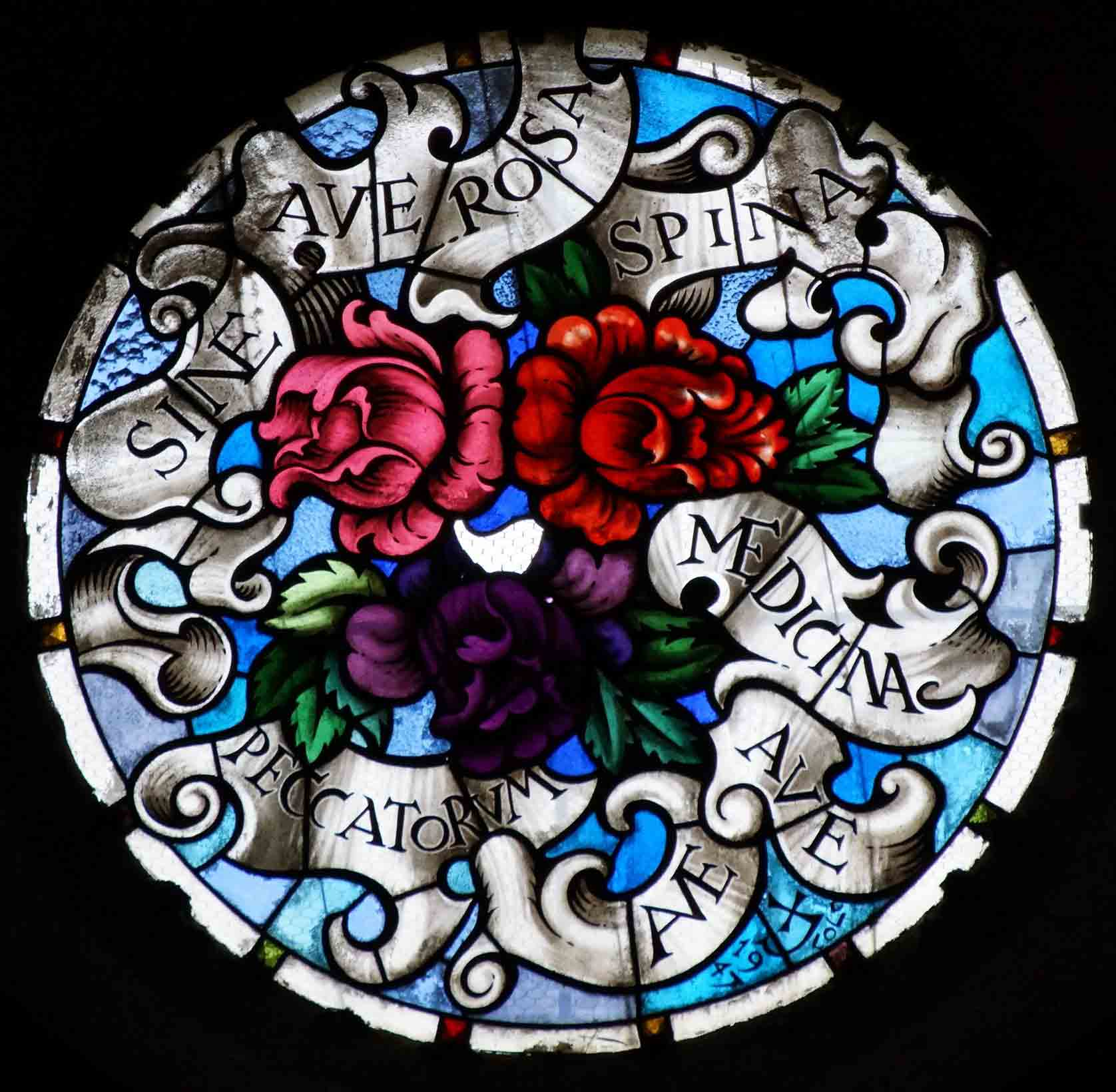
Stained-glass window, the work of Josep Maria Bonet and the architect Josep Maria Jujol

J. M. Bonet worked on the windows of the chapter house of the monastery of Poblet, on the windows of monasteries Vallbona and ceremonies in the windows of St. Mary of the Avellanas, in the parish of St. John of Lleida, on the Cathedral of Sant Feliu de Llobregat, designs by Francesc Labarta and the parishes of Jesus and St. John of Grace. She also worked with the architect Josep Maria Jujol in the parishes of Santa Maria Vilanova and those of Sant Joan Despi.

Xavier Bonet began new business adventures and finally left its positions in the company of stained glass that remained in the hands of Josep Maria Bonet. In addition to his work in the field of Catalan stained glass, he focused on improving materials and processes and worked on the introduction of Tiffany style lamps with tinned copper reserves and vinyl stickers that avoids the laborious use of paper tin and Judea bitumen.

By the 1960s, began a new era in the window which was a new field of art with its own discourse. He worked with artists Will Faber in the windows of the transept of the church of Llars Mundet, Ramon Rogent in stained glass the chapel of the Hospital of Granollers, the parish of Ruby, in the windows Domenech milestone for the Girona Cathedral, with Charles Madiroles to Vic carmelites.

Josep Maria Bonet received the letter glassmaker master craftsman in 1986. He died in Barcelona in 1988 working until almost the last day in the stained glass workshop.
