= Bonnet (surname) =

- Pronunciation: /ˈbɒnɪt/ French: [bɔnɛ]
- Language: French, English

Origin
- Language: Old French
- Origin: bonet
- Derivation: Old Frankish: *bunni
- Meaning: 'material from which hats are made'

Other names
- Variant form: Bonnett

Bonnet is a French surname.

== Geographical distribution ==
As of 2014, 83.0% of all known bearers of the surname Bonnet were residents of France (frequency 1:975), 3.4% of the United States (1:129,853), 2.0% of Haiti (1:6,444), 1.5% of Germany (1:63,573), 1.5% of Belgium (1:9,227), 1.2% of Argentina (1:41,660) and 1.0% of the Dominican Republic (1:12,540).

In France, the frequency of the surname was higher than national average (1:975) in the following regions:

1. French Guiana (1:406)
2. Occitanie (1:538)
3. Auvergne-Rhône-Alpes (1:571)
4. Nouvelle-Aquitaine (1:651)
5. Pays de la Loire (1:796)
6. Provence-Alpes-Côte d'Azur (1:811)
7. Bourgogne-Franche-Comté (1:921)
8. Centre-Val de Loire (1:940)

== People ==
- Arnaud Bonnet (born 1977), French politician
- Beatriz Bonnet (1930–2020), Argentine actress
- Charles Bonnet (1720–1793), Swiss naturalist
- Charles Bonnet (archeologist) (born 1933), Swiss archaeologist
- Carlos Bonnet (1892–1983), Venezuelan composer and orchestra conductor
- Françoise Bonnet (born 1957), French long-distance runner
- Georges Bonnet (1889–1973), French politician
- Graham Bonnet (born 1947), British singer
- Guy Bonnet (1945–2024), French author, composer, and singer
- Henri Bonnet (1888–1978), French politician and diplomat
- Joseph Bonnet (1884–1944), French organist and composer
- Leslie Bonnet (1902–1985), British RAF officer, duck breeder and writer
- Louis Bonnet (1815–1892), French doctor and politician
- Luis Alberto Bonnet (born 1971), Argentine retired footballer
- Marie-Jo Bonnet (born 1945), French writer and historian
- Peter Bonnet (1936–2023), British major general
- Pierre Ossian Bonnet (1819–1892), French mathematician
- René Bonnet (businessman) (1904–1983), French driver and automobile constructor
- René Bonnet (footballer) (1880–?), French footballer
- René Bonnet (1905–1998), better known as Herboné, French comic book artist and scriptwriter
- Rob Bonnet (born 1952), British journalist
- Roger-Maurice Bonnet (1937–2026), French astrophysicist
- Stede Bonnet (1688–1718), Barbadian pirate
- Sylvie Bonnet (born 1969), French politician
- William Bonnet (born 1982), French road bicycle racer

== Fictional characters ==
- Stephen Bonnet, a villain in Diana Gabaldon's Outlander series
