= Balmoral bonnet =

Traditional Scots headgear

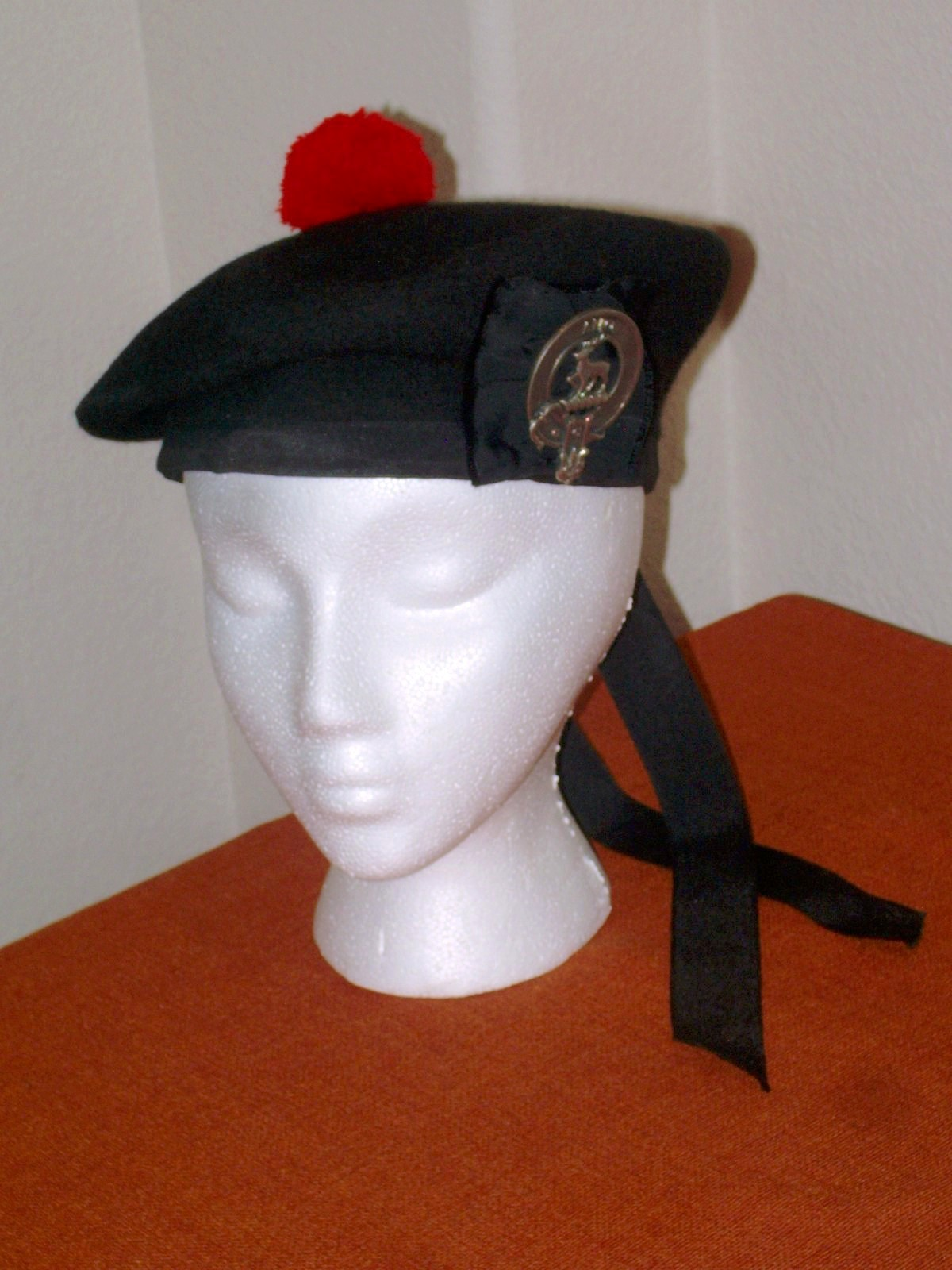
A Balmoral bonnet made of black wool with a black grosgrain headband, Scottish crest badge cockade and ribbons and a red yarn toorie

The Balmoral bonnet (also known as a Balmoral cap or Kilmarnock bonnet) is a traditional Scottish hat that can be worn as part of formal or informal Highland dress. Developed from the earlier blue bonnet, dating to at least the 16th century, it takes the form of a knitted, soft wool cap with a flat crown. It is named after Balmoral Castle, a royal residence in Scotland. It is an alternative to the similar and related (informal) Tam o' Shanter cap and the (formal or informal) Glengarry bonnet.

== Design ==
Originally with a voluminous crown, today, the bonnet is smaller, made of finer cloth, and tends to be dark blue, black, or Lovat green. Ribbons in or attached to the back of the band (originally used to secure the bonnet tightly) are sometimes worn hanging from the back of the cap. A regimental or clan badge is worn on the left-hand side, affixed to a silk or grosgrain ribbon cockade (usually black, white, or red), with the bonnet usually worn tilted to the right to display this emblem. The centre of the crown features a toorie, traditionally red. Some versions have a diced band (usually red and white check) around the lower edge's circumference.

== History ==
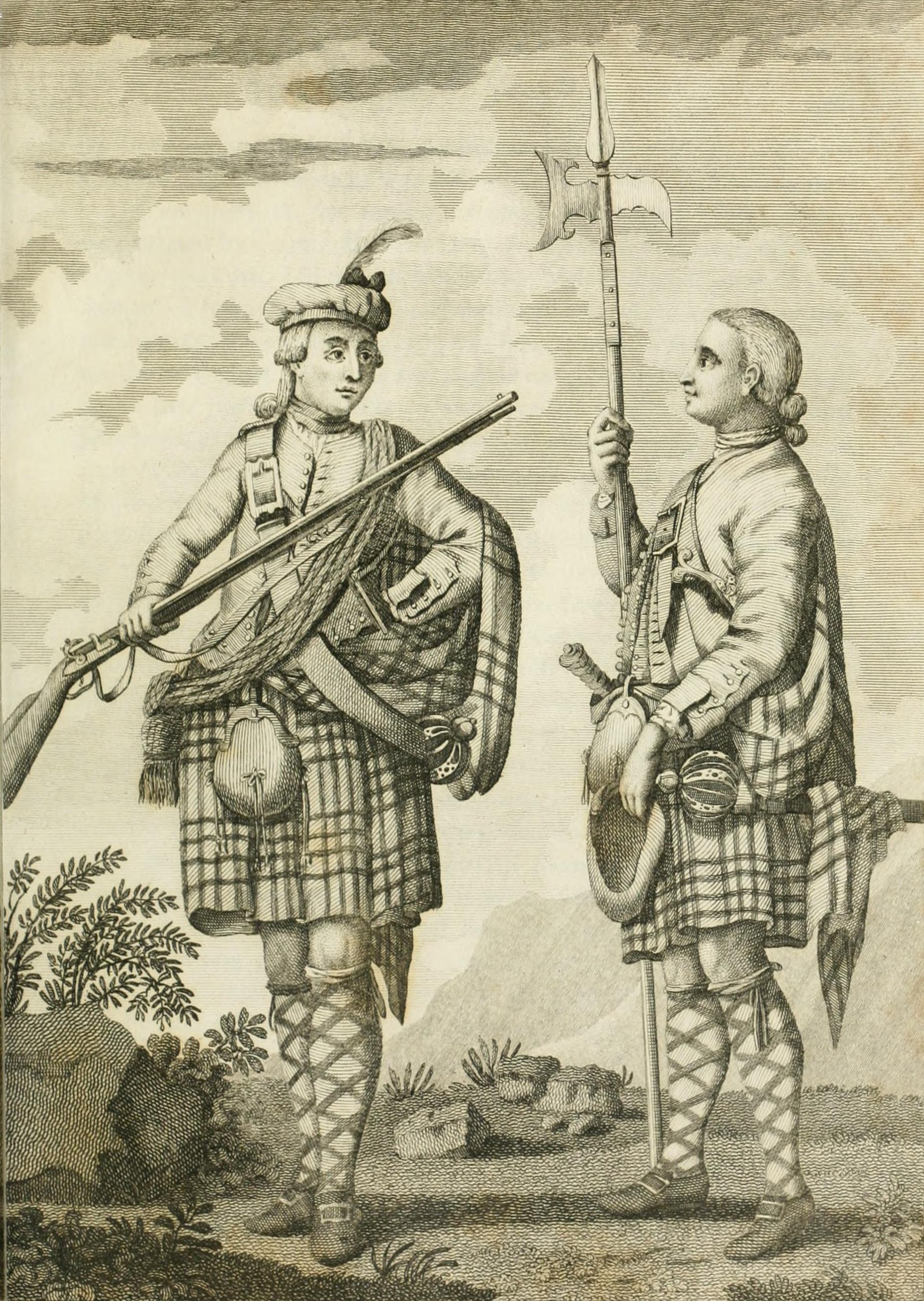
Soldier from a Highland regiment c. 1740 wearing Balmoral or blue bonnet (hard to distinguish by this period) and tartan belted plaids (great kilts).

As worn by Scottish Highland regiments, the blue bonnet (common civilian headwear) gradually developed into two military forms. One was the Balmoral/Kilmarnock bonnet, illustrated clearly, complete with ribbon cockade and small toorie (pompon), around 1744. The other was a taller, stiffened felt cylinder, often decorated with an ostrich-plume hackle sweeping over the crown from left to right (as well as flashes of bearskin or painted turkey hackles). The dividing line between the blue bonnet and the Balmoral/Kilmarnock is unclear. A mid-18th-century portrait of Lord George Murray shows a black cap essentially indistinguishable from a Balmoral, but sometimes described as a "blue bonnet".

In the 19th century, the taller version of the military cap evolved into the extravagant full dress feather bonnet. Meanwhile, the plainer, flatter form continued in use, as an undress cap, until the mid-19th century. By then known as the Kilmarnock bonnet, it was officially replaced by the Glengarry bonnet, which had been in use unofficially since the late eighteenth century and was essentially a folding side cap version of the cylindrical military cap. The name "Balmoral", as applied to the traditional headdress, appears to date from the late 19th century. Balmorals were described in 1842 as having become common civilian headwear "worn pretty generally by ploughmen, carters and boys of the humbler ranks".

In 1903, a blue bonnet in traditional style but with a stiffened crown was adopted briefly by some Lowland regiments as full-dress headgear. After the Second World War, while all other Scottish regiments chose the Glengarry, a soft blue Balmoral was adopted as full dress headgear by the Black Watch (Royal Highland Regiment) and was worn with the green no. 1 dress jacket and with khaki no. 2 or service dress. As part of the amalgamation of the Scottish regiments in 2006, the military Balmoral was done away with; all battalions of the Royal Regiment of Scotland now wear the Glengarry. The Balmoral is still widely used as a part of a uniform in the Army Cadet Force, including its pipe band.

Use of the Balmoral has been championed by songwriter Richard Thompson, who uses it on stage, in addition to its traditional place in Highland dress.

== North American usage ==
All Canadian highland regiments, e.g. the 48th Highlanders of Canada, the Nova Scotia Highlanders, and the Queen's Own Cameron Highlanders of Canada, as well as the officers, warrant officers and senior non-commissioned officers of the Calgary Highlanders wear the Balmoral. It has also been recorded as being worn unofficially by Confederate and Union soldiers in the American Civil War. Commanding officer of the 12th Illinois volunteer infantry also known as the 1st Scotch Regiment as well as multiple senior officers such as John McArthur and Duncan MacLean.

== Other usage ==
The Hong Kong Police Band bagpipes section wears a black and red version.

== See also ==
- List of hat styles
