= Juan-Julio Bonet Sugrañes =

Spanish chemist

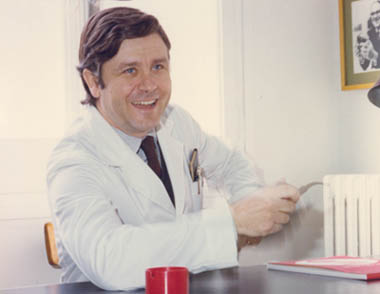
Portrait of Juan-Julio Bonet Sugrañes

Juan-Julio Bonet Sugrañes (1940–2006) was a Spanish chemist and founder of the first laboratory and research school of steroid chemistry in Spain.

== Education ==
Born in Barcelona, Bonet studied at Institut Químic de Sarrià (IQS) in Barcelona (1956–1961) where he graduated in chemistry and chemical engineering. Granted by Fundación Juan March he moved to the Laboratorium für Organische Chemie of the Eidgenössische Technische Hochschule in Zürich (ETHZ) to study chemistry with Professor Oskar Jeger in the field of solvotic reactions on steroids (PhD, 1965).

== Career ==
Back in Spain, Bonet joined the faculty at IQS as Professor of Natural Products and Organic Photochemistry until 1986 when he left to Wassemann Laboratories as scientific director. In 1988, he was appointed director of technology transfer at Institut de Recerca i Tecnologia Alimentàries (IRTA).

Bonet has pioneered steroid chemistry in Spain by founding a devoted research lab at IQS from which a school of steroid chemistry was born. He has supervised 14 PhD theses and 145 graduate works.

== Book ==
The interest of Bonet for the arts and history had resulted in the book Viaje al Reino de Saturno published in 2004. The history of chemistry in Europe going back to Lavoisier and the late alchemists is presented by looking at the daily lives and works of the chemists and how they were affected by the political constraints of their times. This humanist view of chemistry was gathered by Bonet after his many readings and visits to sites and libraries and interviews with chemists and historians in Europe during more than 15 years.
