= Pom-pom =

Decorative ball or tuft of fibrous material

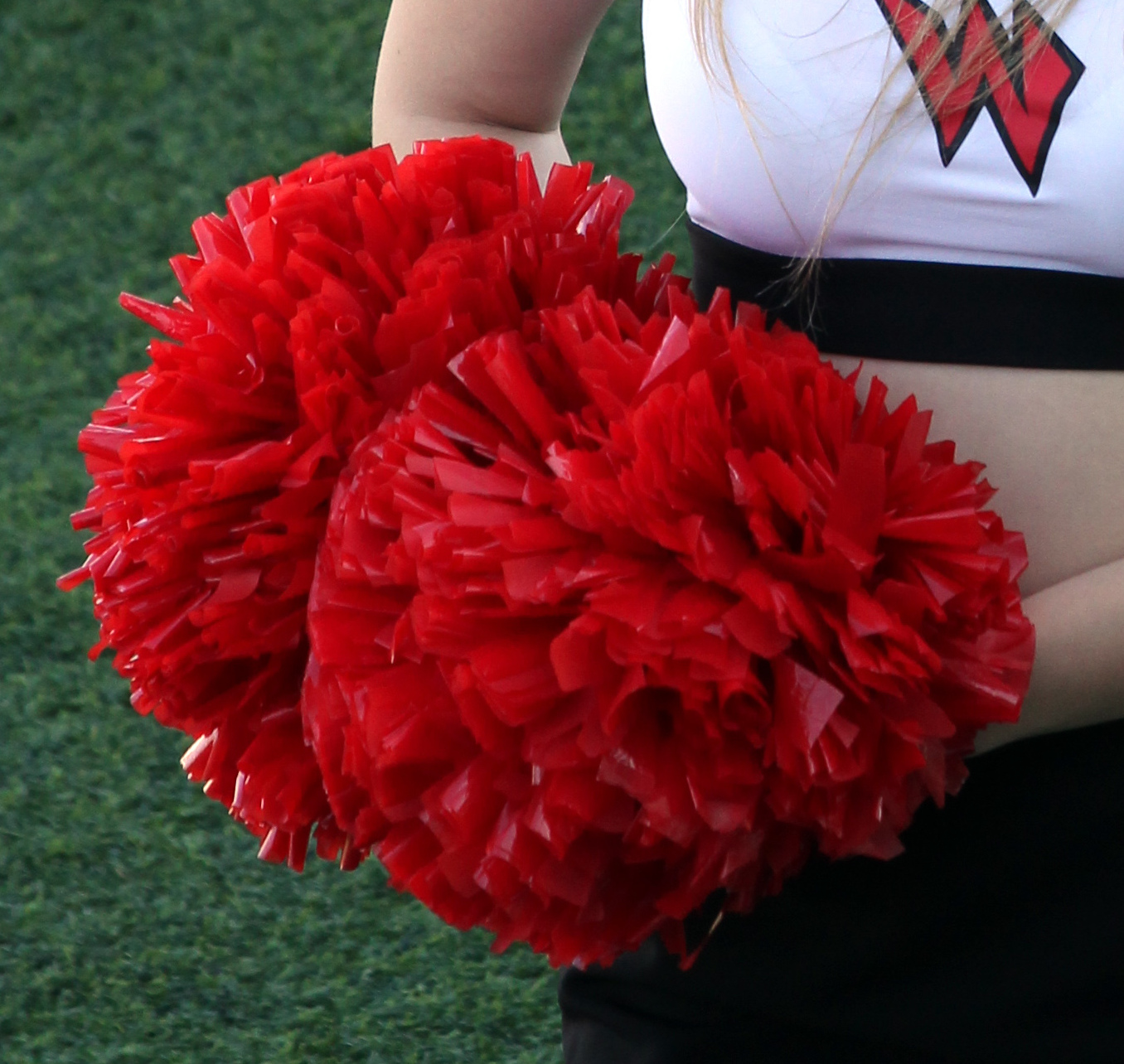
Pom-poms are mainly used to cheer for sports.

Three cheerleaders dancing with pom-poms in Tokyo, Japan

A pom-pom – also spelled pom-pon, pompom or pompon – is a decorative ball or tuft of fibrous material.

The term may refer to large tufts used by cheerleaders, or a small, tighter ball attached to the top of a hat, also known as a bobble or toorie.

Pom-poms may come in many colours, sizes, and varieties and are made from a wide array of materials, including wool, cotton, paper, plastic, thread, glitter and occasionally feathers. Pom-poms are shaken by cheerleaders, pom or dance teams, and sports fans during spectator sports.

== Etymology and spelling ==
Pom-pom, also called a pom or cheerleading pom, is derived from the French word pompon, which refers to a small decorative ball made of fabric or feathers. It also means an "ornamental round tuft" and originally refers to its use on a hat, or an "ornamental tuft; tuft-like flower head."

- Webster's Third New International Dictionary (1961) gives the spelling as "pompon."
- The New Oxford American Dictionary (third edition, 2010) gives the spelling as "pom-pom."
- The American Heritage Dictionary of the English Language (5th edition, 2011) gives the spelling as "pompom" or "pompon."
- Webster's New World College Dictionary (fourth edition) gives the spelling as "pompom."

== Sports and cheerleading ==
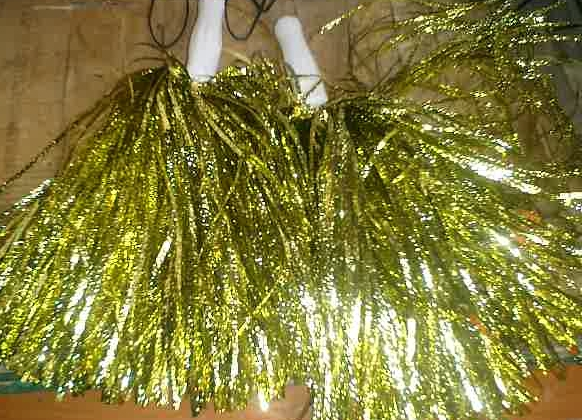
A pair of cheerleading pom-poms

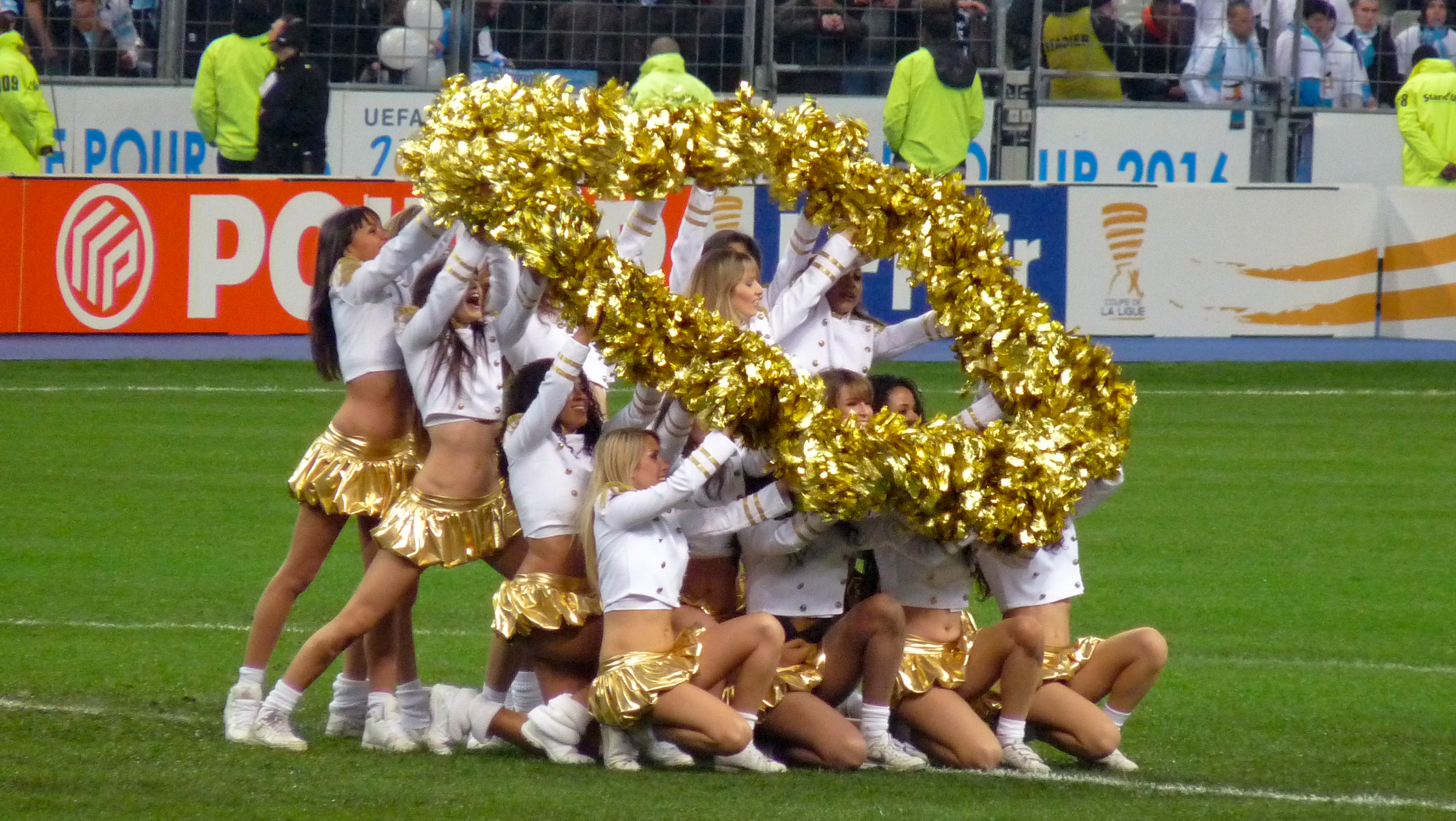
Cheerleaders using pom-poms to spell out letters

Cheerleading innovator Lawrence Herkimer received a patent for the pom-pom in 1968. His original patent application, for which he called the invention pom-pon, mentioned that they were made out of crepe paper or other similar material. Since then pom-poms have been made of plastic but Mylar (also called BoPET) has become increasingly popular in recent years.

Cheerleading pom-poms come in a variety of shapes, styles, colors, color combinations, and sizes. The most common size, the six-inch (150 mm) works most age groups or performance type. This size can be used for dance teams, pom squads, cheerleaders, and majorettes, easily making it the most versatile strand length on the market. The second most common size, the five-inch (130 mm), is adequate for any age group or performance type, but the marginally shorter strands provide the necessary flash while acting more as an accent to the uniform.

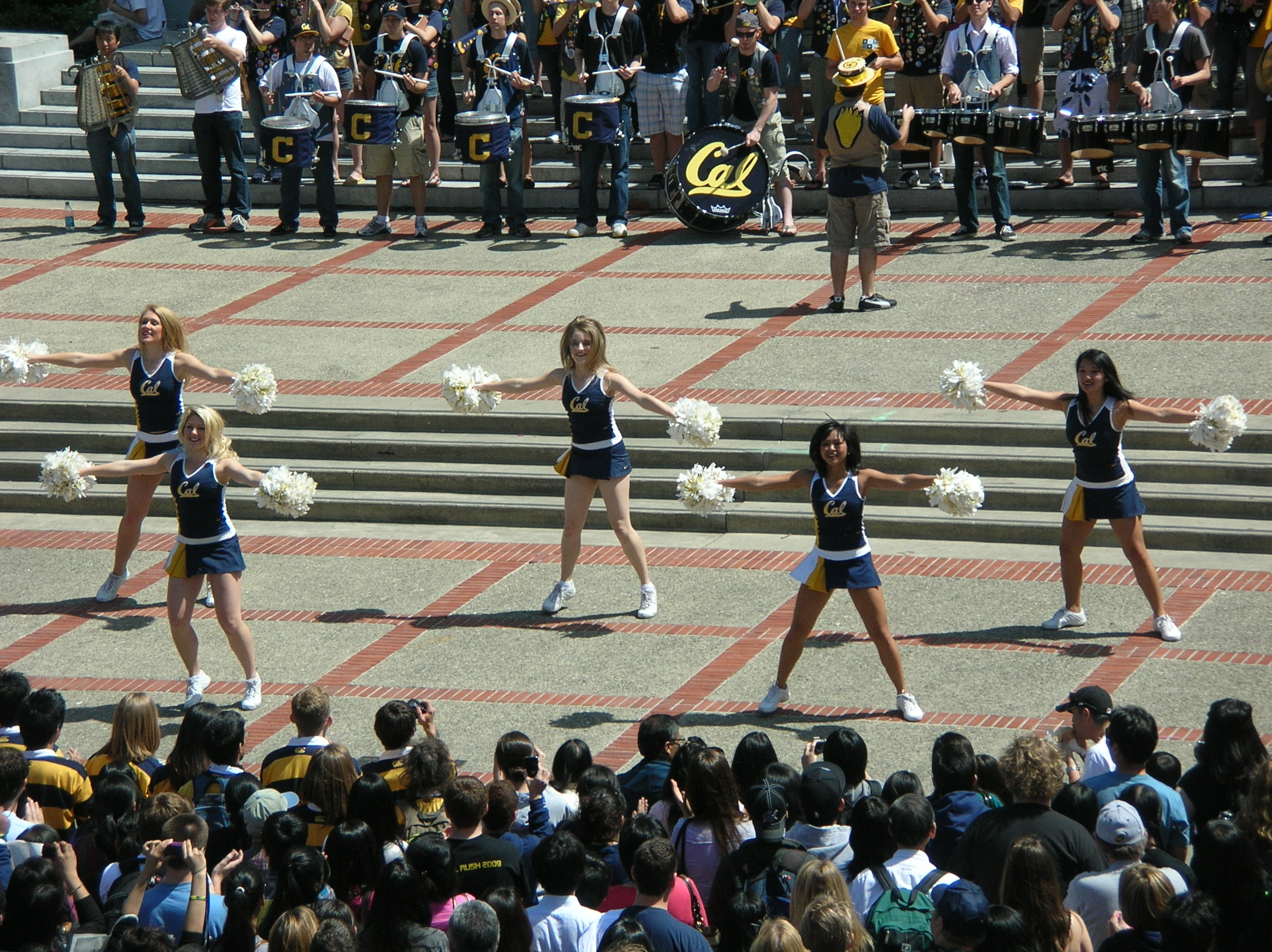
Pom-poms are also used by some dance teams. (University of California, Berkeley)

Pom-poms are also waved by sports fans, primarily at college and high school sports events in the United States. These inexpensive, light-weight faux pom-poms, or rooter poms, typically come in team colors, are sometimes given away or sold to spectators at such events.

== Clothing ==
=== Toorie ===
In reference to Scottish Highland dress and Scottish military uniforms, the small pom-pom on the crown of such hats as the Balmoral, the Glengarry, and the Tam o' Shanter is called a "toorie."

The toorie is generally made of yarn and is traditionally red on both Balmorals and Glengarries (although specific units have used other colours). It has evolved into the smaller pom-pom found on older-style golf caps and the button atop baseball caps.

The word toorie is used for any such hat decoration in the Scots language, irrespective of the headgear.

== Toys and bicycles ==
Pom-poms are sometimes used as children's toys. They are a common feature at the ends of the handlebars of children's tricycles and bicycles. They are also used in children's artistic crafts to add texture and color.

Pom poms are also commonly used for gift wrapping and in parties and occasions to add a flair of fun.

== Gallery ==
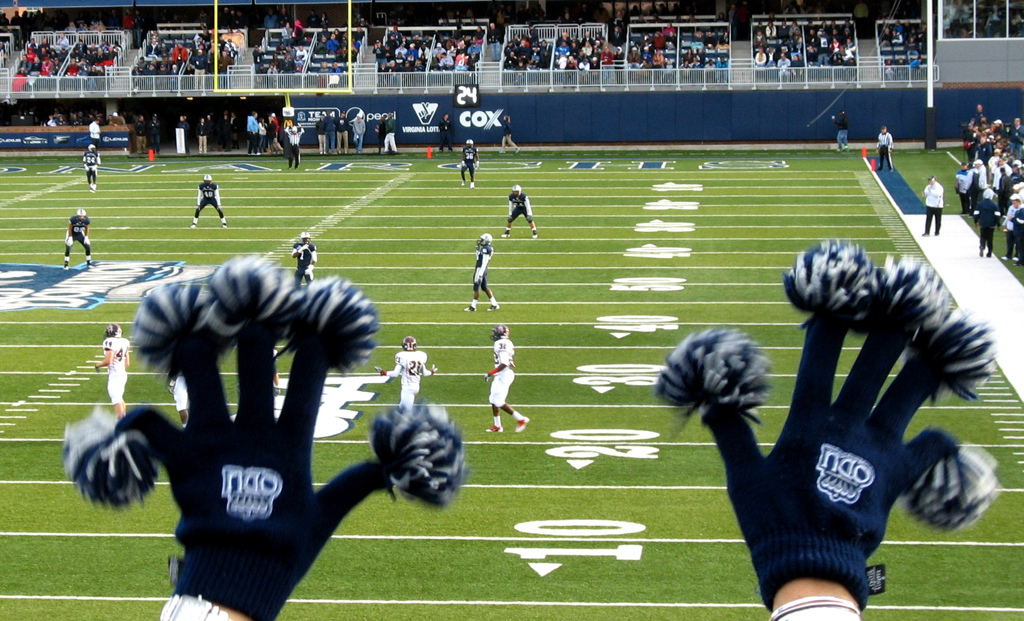
Finger pom poms

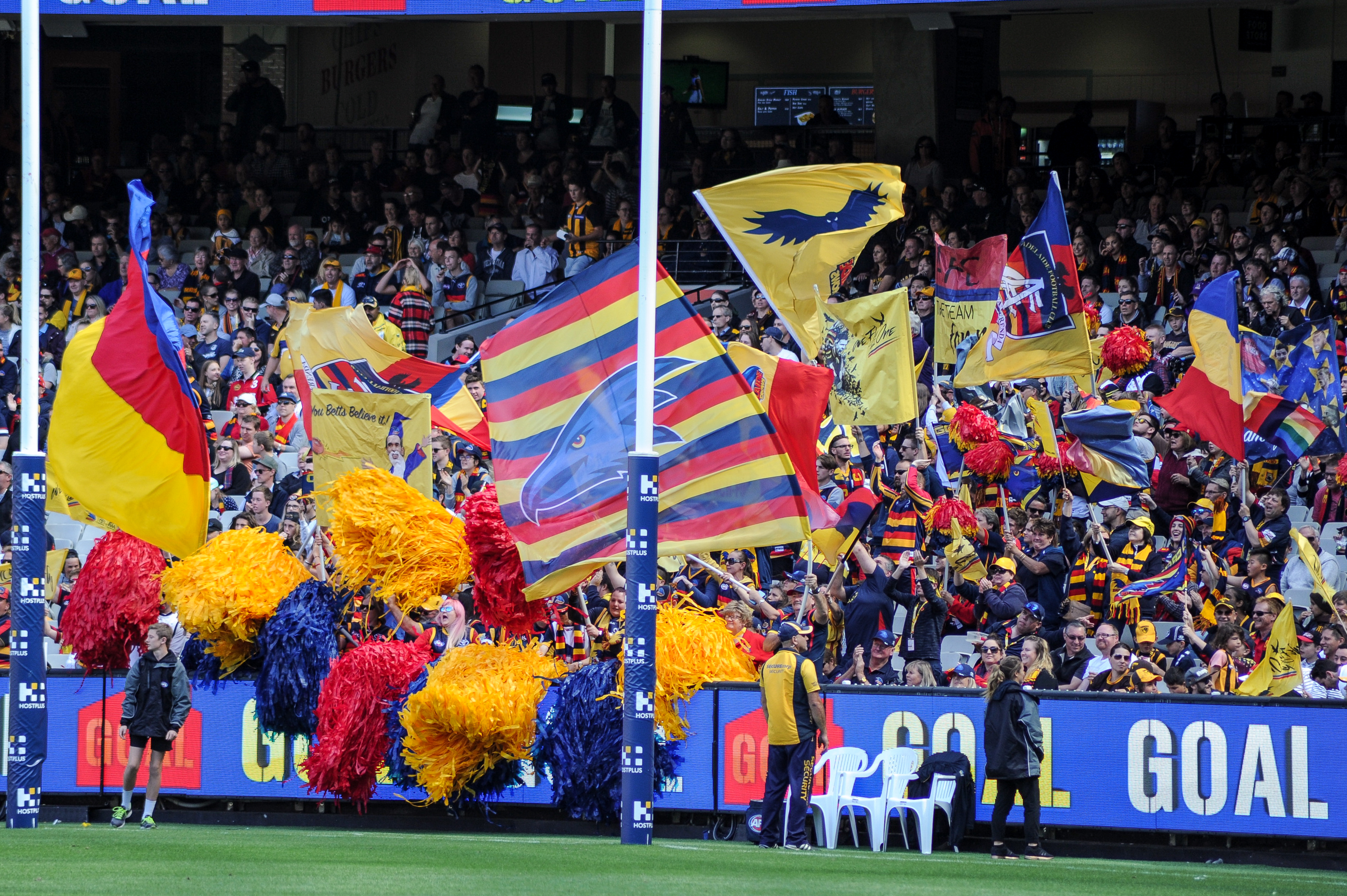
Fans waving floggers behind the goals to signify that a goal was scored.

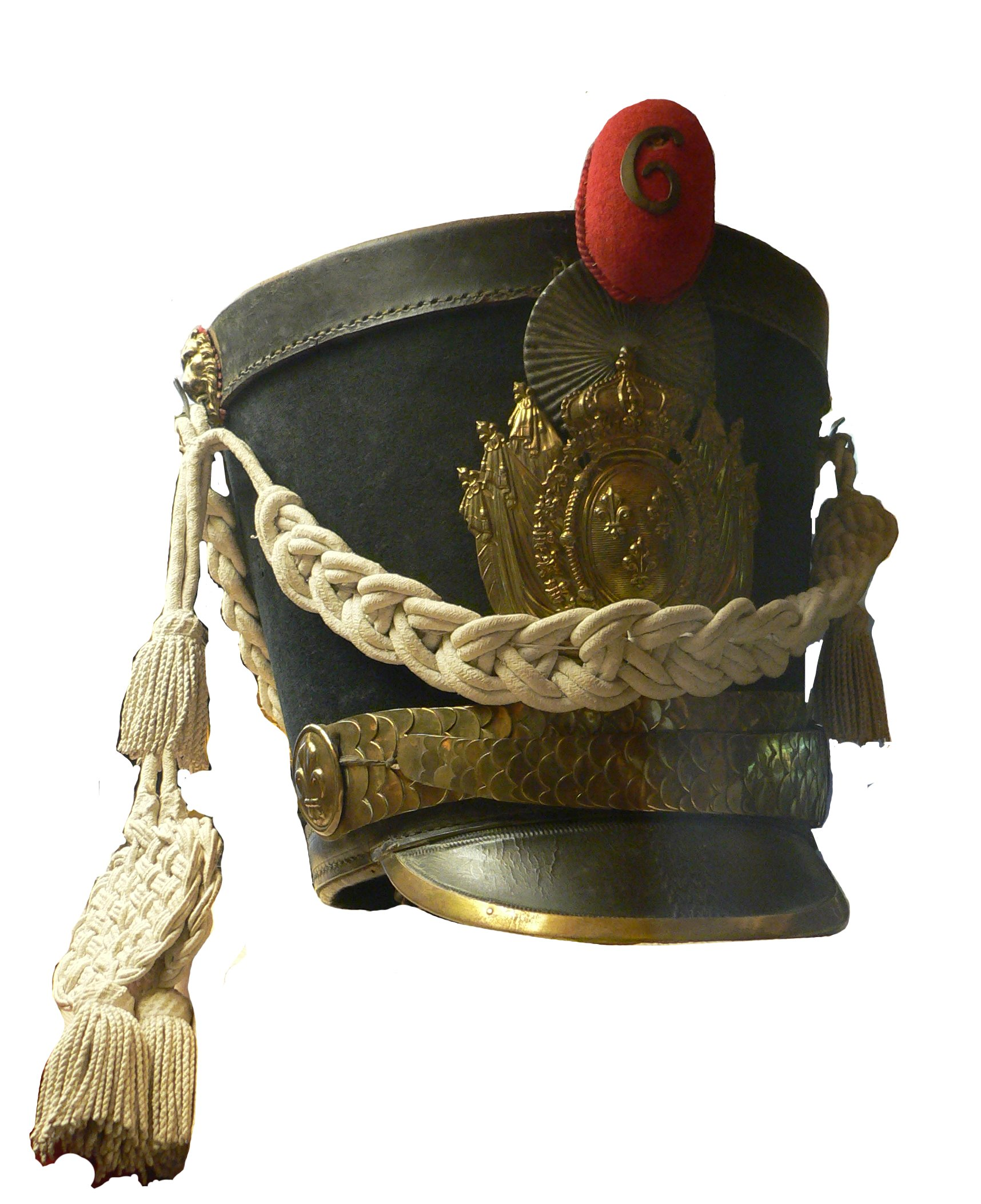
Shako dating from the Bourbon Restoration with a red company pompon.

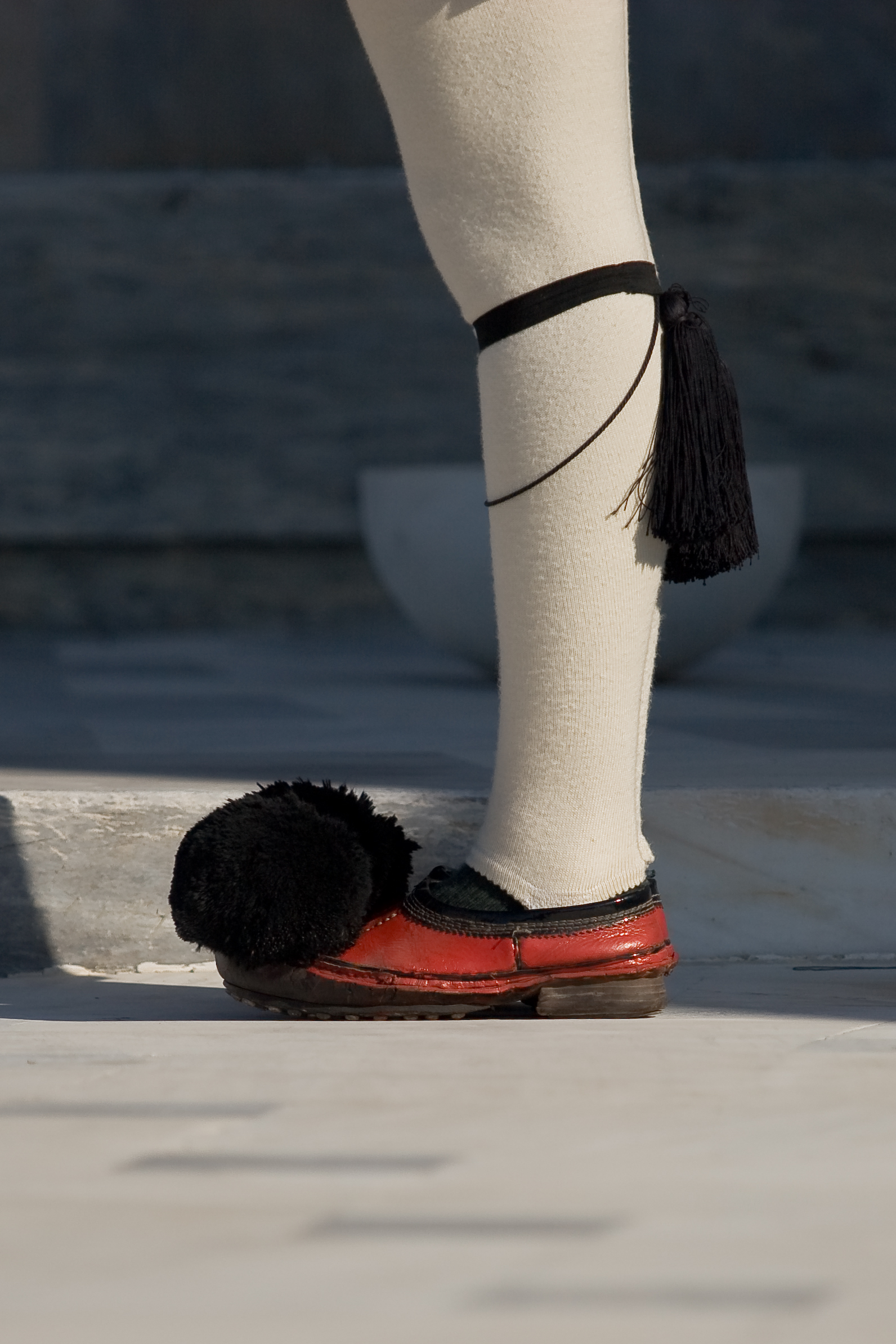
Greek Presidential Guard shoes.

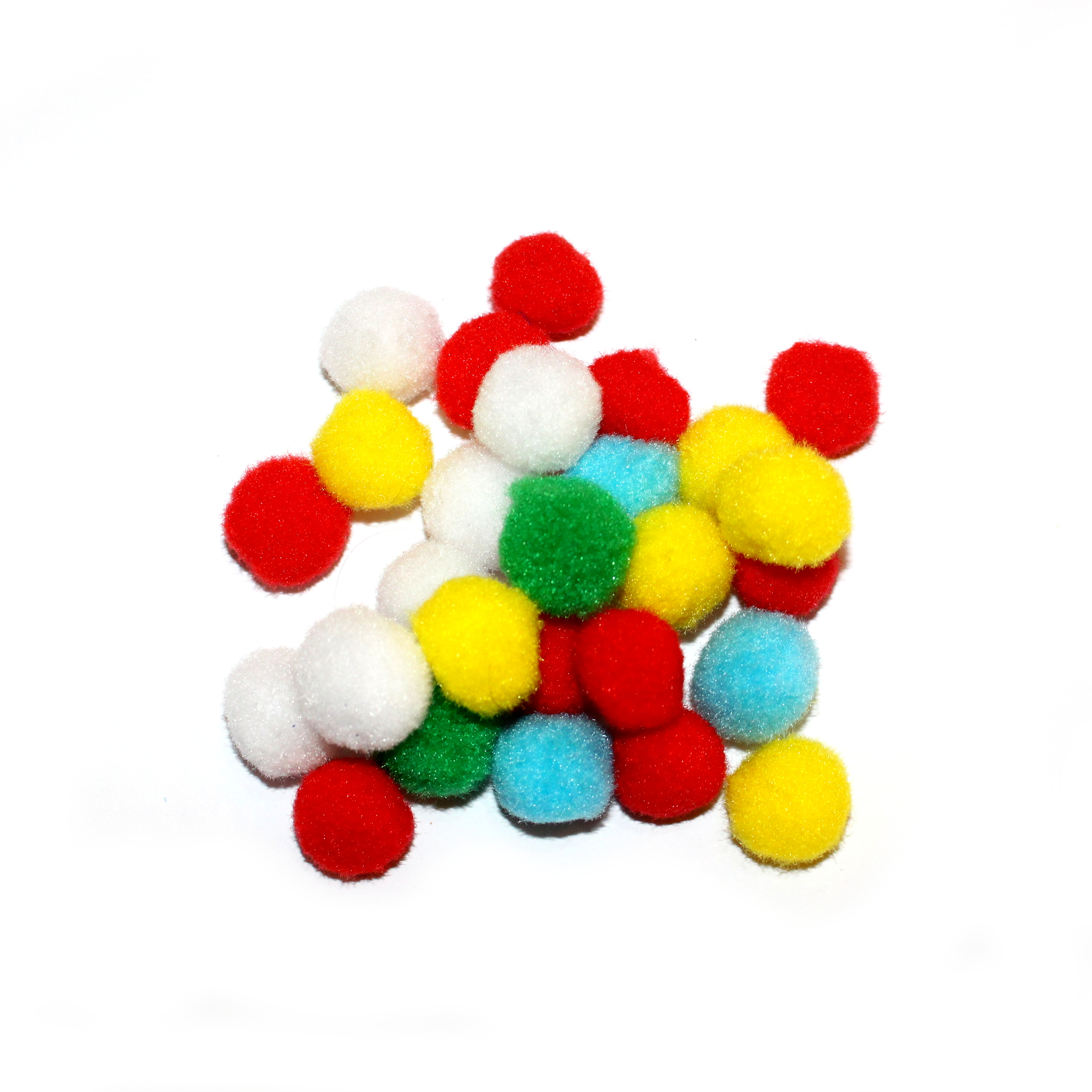
Pile of pom-poms used for children's crafts.
