= Arturo Bonet =

Spanish chess player

Arturo Bonet Polledo was a Spanish chess master.

Bonet lived in Asturias, an autonomous community within the kingdom of Spain. In 1936, he participated in the Barcelona la Olimpiada Obrera, as a replication of the 1936 Summer Olympics in Berlin, organised by Nazis.

He tied for 6-7th place at Gijón in 1944 (in the 1st International Tournament, Alexander Alekhine won); took 7th place at Gijón in 1945 (2nd place was won by Antonio Rico), but won an individual game against Alekhine. Bonet had already beat Alekhine in a simultaneous game at Madrid in 1923. He took 12th place at Gijón in 1949 (Nicolas Rossolimo won 6th place) and twice took 3rd place in Asturias championships in 1952 and 1955.
