= Jose Antonio Ortega Bonet =

Jose Antonio Ortega Bonet (October 27, 1929 – September 19, 2009) was a Cuban-born entrepreneur and businessman who founded the Sazón Goya Food Company. Ortega, who was nicknamed "Pepe", was known as "El Gallego" to his friends.

Jose Antonio Ortega Bonet was born in Havana, Cuba, on October 27, 1929. He attended the Belen Jesuit School, which had been founded by the Jesuits in Havana in 1854. Ortega graduated from the University of Havana with a business science degree. When he was still relatively young, Bonet began working at a food distribution company called F. Bonet y Cía after the death of his father. He soon launched his own business. Ortega founded the first automobile air-conditioning business in Cuba.

Ortega married his wife, Lucila Galvis Gómez-Plata, a Colombian student studying in Havana, in April 1954. The couple had two children during their marriage, María Elena and José Antonio Ortega Jr. The family left Cuba in 1960 following the Cuban Revolution led by Fidel Castro. They briefly moved to Lucila's native Colombia before settling in Puerto Rico in 1963.

Ortega launched a new food business in Puerto Rico. This business would eventually become the Sazón Goya Food Company under a partnership with the Unanue family, who owned Goya Foods.

Ortega and his family moved to Miami, Florida, in 1976. Once in Miami, Ortega continued to run Sazón Goya, expanding its products into new markets in the United States with the growth of the Hispanic population throughout the country. Ortega continued to head his company until his death in 2009.

Ortega devoted his time to philanthropy, especially in the Miami area. He devoted time and money to a number of local institutions, including Mercy Hospital, the José Martí scholarship program, the League Against Cancer and the Centro Mater Foundation.

Jose Antonio Ortega Bonet died of cancer at his home in Coral Gables, Florida, on September 19, 2009, at the age of 79. His funeral was held at the Epiphany Parrish, and he was buried in Woodlawn Park North Cemetery in Miami.
