= Carlos Bonnet =

Venezuelan musician (1892–1983)

Carlos Bonnet (sometimes Carlos Bonet) (October 29, 1892 – January 16, 1983) was a Venezuelan composer, orchestra conductor, and military man.

Bonnet was born in Villa de Cura, Estado Aragua, Venezuela, on October 29, 1892. He studied in the Escuela Musical Militar Infantil. He conducted the Venezuelan Army 1st Brigade Music Band, and was the dean of the Venezuelan Military Orchestra School.

On December 9, 1930, Bonnet conducted the Radio Caracas Radio (RCR) orchestra for the RCR official inauguration.

As a composer, he wrote multiple songs, including "Quitapesares", "La Partida" (Venezuelan waltz), "El trabadedos", "Refranero", "La tierra de mi querer", "Overellas de un pampero", "Negra la quiero" and others.

He died on January 16, 1983.

== See also ==
- Venezuela
- Venezuelan culture
