= Feather bonnet =

Military headdress of Scottish origin

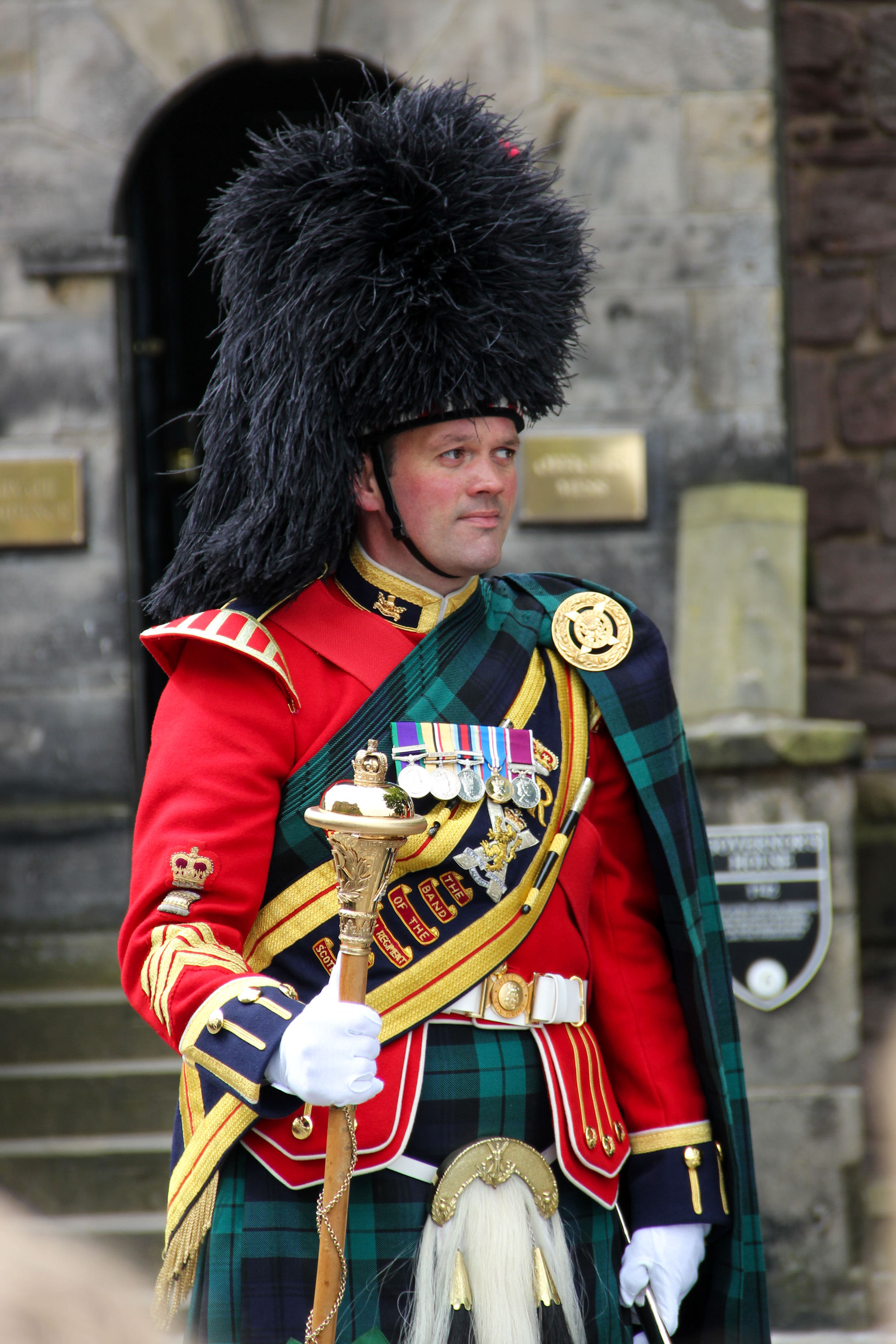
Drum major of the Band of the Royal Regiment of Scotland wearing the feather bonnet

The feather bonnet is a type of military headdress used mainly by the Scottish Highland infantry regiments of the British Army from about 1763 until the outbreak of World War I. It is now mostly worn by pipers and drummers in various bands throughout the world. It is also worn in a similar fashion by regiments in various Commonwealth armies.

== History ==
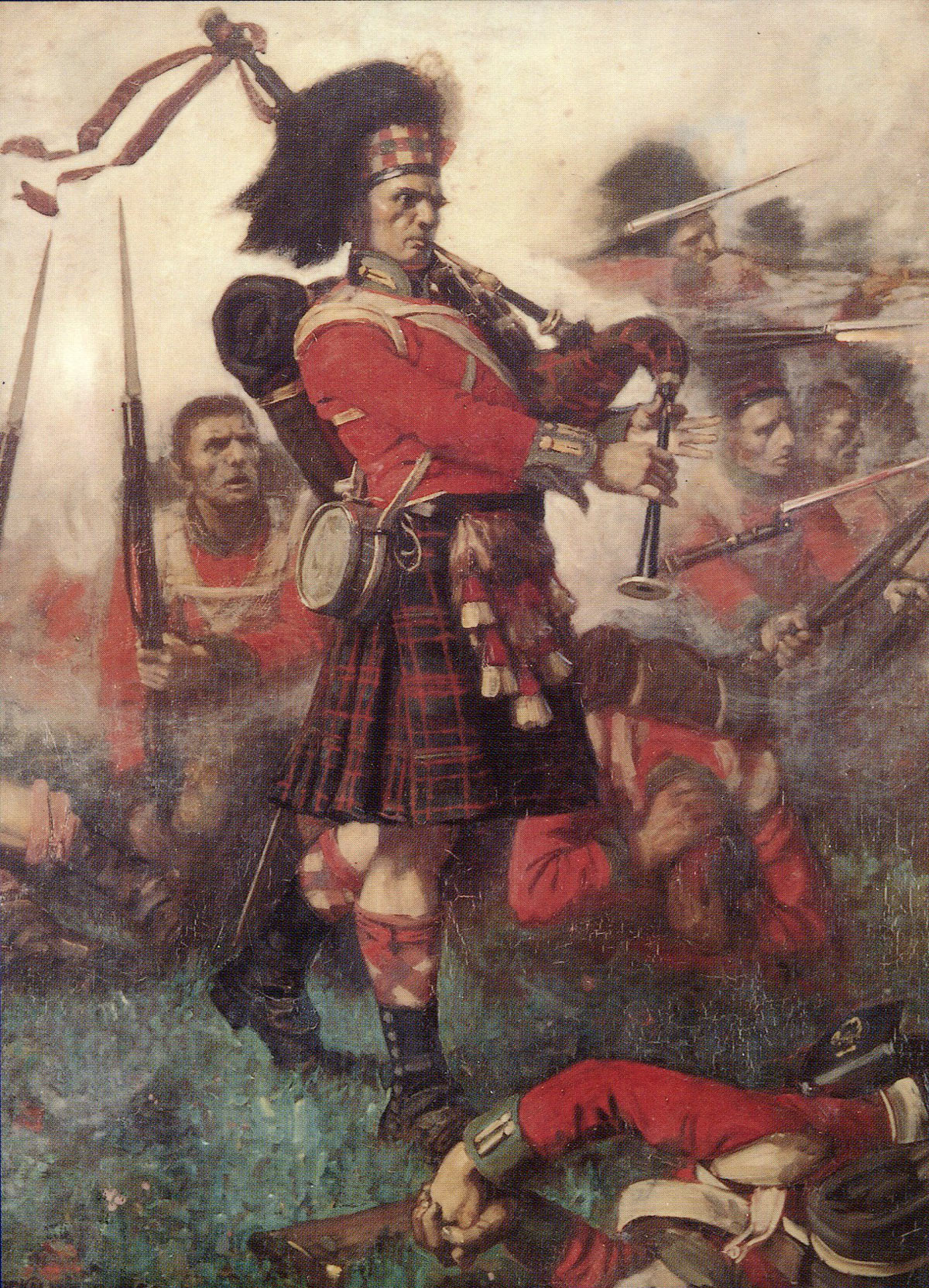
Queen's Own Cameron Highlanders' Piper, Kenneth MacKay, urges on the Highland Troops at The Battle of Waterloo in 1815, by William Lockhart Bogle. Note his headgear, the feather bonnet of c. 1800.

The feather bonnet began with the knitted blue bonnet with a chequered border. This was propped up and worn with a tall hackle. During the 17th and 18th century, the highlanders who wore this hat began to add ostrich feathers to decorate it. This decoration evolved into a full covering of the original bonnet. The ostrich feathers were then entwined into a lightweight cage, producing the height. The feather bonnet has one or more (usually 4 or 5) "tails" that hang down below the headband, and the regimental badge and hackle are displayed on the left.

There are parallels between the evolution of the Highland bonnet between 1760 and 1790 and the stationing of Highland regiments in North America in this period. The influence of the head-dresses of Native Americans on the bonnets of these troops is likely as contemporary pictures of Highlanders in Scotland do not show similar ornamentation with feathers, other than those of a few clan chiefs. On the return of the 42nd Foot to Britain in 1790 an official report commented that "Their bonnets are entirely disfigured. They are so covered with lofty feathers that they appear like grenadier caps of black bearskin."

== Use ==
The feather bonnet has been used by all of the Scottish highland regiments at one point or another. Examples include the Black Watch (red Hackle) and the Seaforth Highlanders, Gordon Highlanders, Queen's Own Cameron Highlanders and Argyll and Sutherland Highlanders (all with white hackles). Despite its elaborate appearance, the feather bonnet is a highly practical piece of military gear, as it is lightweight and the internal cage offers protection from blows. William Gordon-Alexander, an officer of the Sutherland Highlanders who served in India in the 1850s, after describing how a tulwar-cut to the head of a fellow officer had been averted by the wire frame of his feather bonnet, said: "Burroughs' feather bonnet saved his life from this sword-cut, as many of our lives were saved by it, in the succeeding hot-weather campaign, from the sun", immediately quoting an 1884 pamphlet by Lord Archibald Campbell in defence of the feather bonnet as being:

[…] not only the most serviceable head-dress in the British army as a protection against sword-cuts but also being, when properly made up, the most perfectly ventilated and coolest one for hot climates hitherto invented.

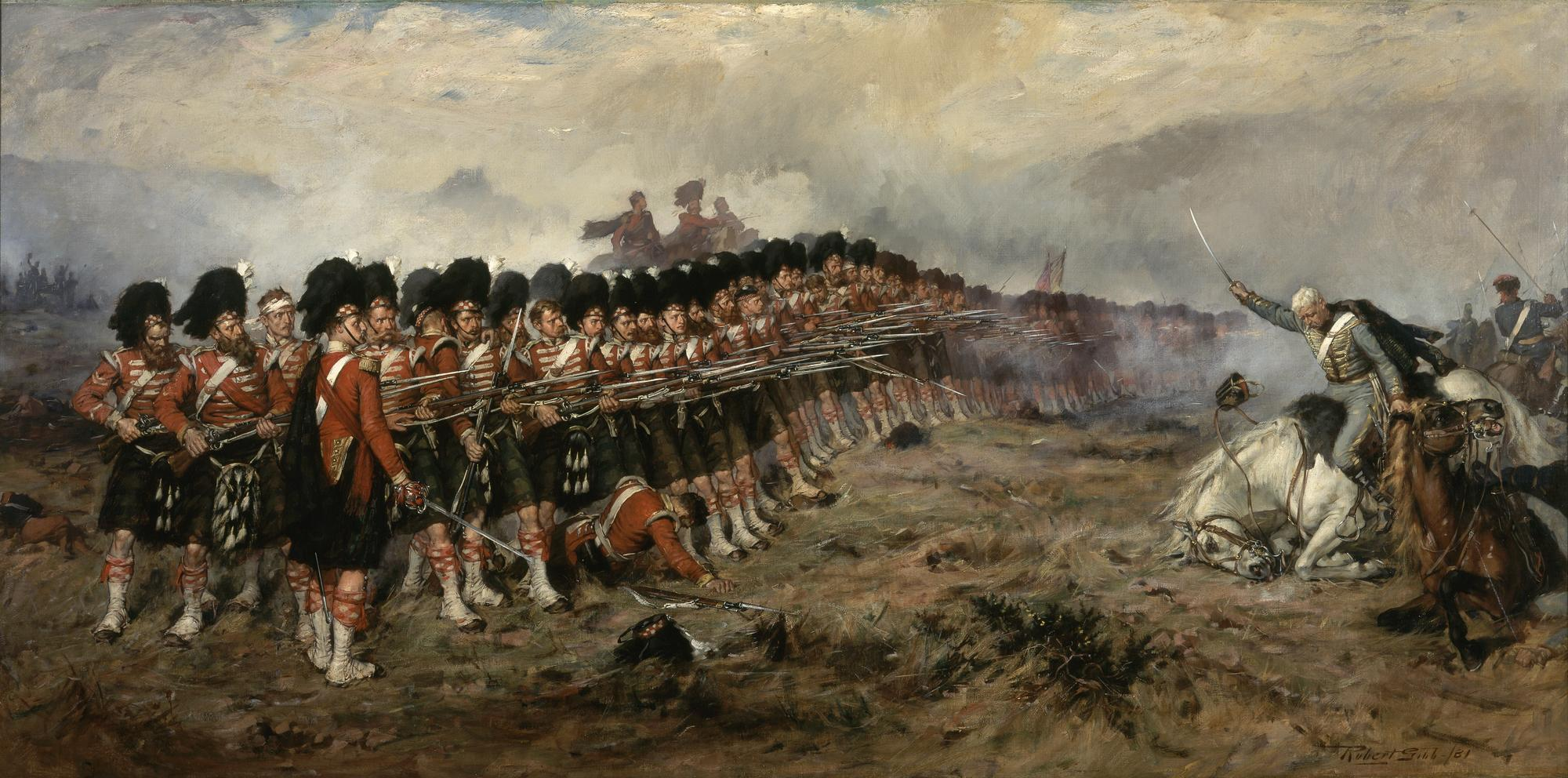
Feather bonnets, as worn by the Sutherland Highlanders formed in 'The Thin Red Line' which repelled the Russian cavalry at the Battle of Balaklava in 1856.

== See also ==
- List of hat styles
