= Cape (dog) =

Identifying article worn by working dogs

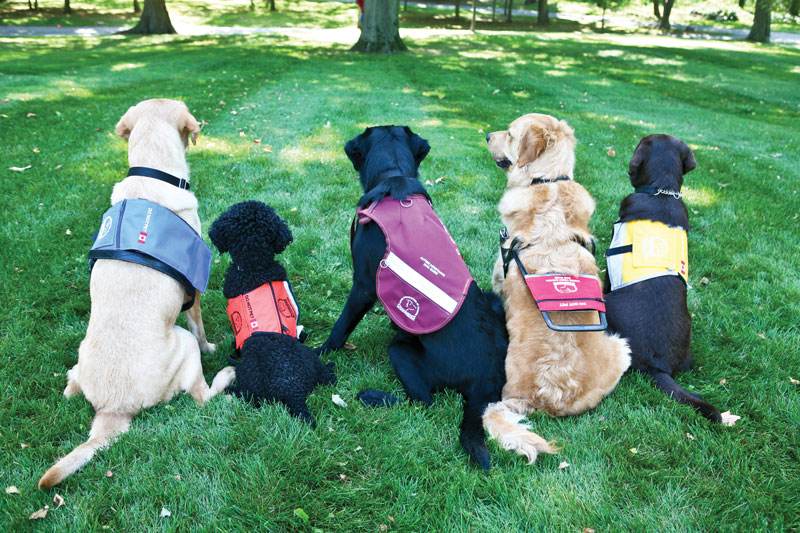
Various guide dog capes showing their training program or sponsoring organization

A cape, jacket, or vest is an article worn by a working dog to identify or assist them in their job.

Many assistance dogs wear capes if nothing else than identification is needed. They often bear the logo of the organization that trained them, the names of companies that sponsored their training, and usually a patch requesting that the dog is not petted or distracted. Although they are not assistance dogs in the legal sense, some therapy dogs wear similar capes to identify them as such.

A police or detection dog might wear a jacket to identify them and/or protect their torso.

Another piece of equipment similar to a cape is the harnesses that guide dogs and some mobility assistance dogs wear for leading, bracing, or pulling. Also, assistance dogs that carry items for their handlers wear backpacks, though sometimes these are also referred to as jackets.

== Assistance dog attire ==
A cape is a lightweight loose-fitting piece of fabric that lays over the dog's back and has a strap that goes under the ribs and one across the chest. A service vest is usually more form-fitting than a cape. A brace and mobility harness is a tight-fighting strong harness with a handle used to assist people who need help walking or balancing. A pulling harness is a stronger-strapped harness with padding used for assisting in the pulling of wheelchairs. Additional elements for assistance dog attire might include reflective strips, zippered pockets, D-rings, hook-and-loop fastener areas for attaching patches, a top-mount handle, a brightly colored collar or leash, or one with lettering on it. Typical fabrics are breathable mesh, waterproof nylon, or canvas.

In the US, the Americans with Disabilities Act does not require a service dog to wear a vest, ID tag, or specific harness. In the UK, there is no requirement for an assistance dog to wear any particular jacket or other marks to show that it is an assistance dog. However, in 2015 the House of Lords Select Committee on the Equality Act 2010 published a report which, among other changes, suggested to amend the laws so that a kitemark might be worn by genuine assistance dogs trained to an appropriate standard and certified for public access. The purpose of such insignia is to deter use of fraudulent assistance dogs and reassure merchants that a particular dog is a legitimate assistance dog.

In over half the states of the US there are laws prohibiting dressing your dog in such a way as to fraudulently represent it as a service animal.

Examples of assistance dog attire
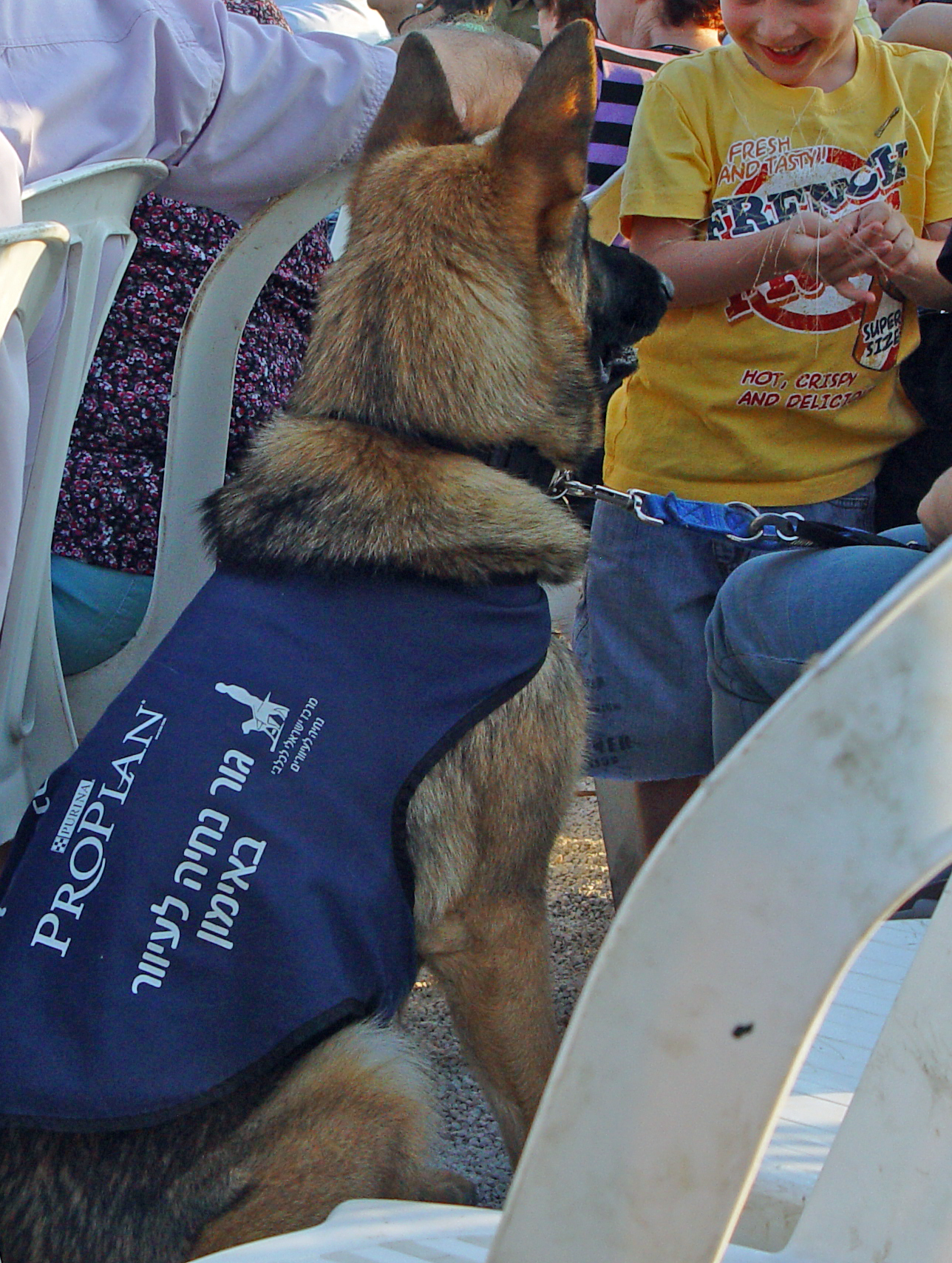
A cape identifies a young dog in training

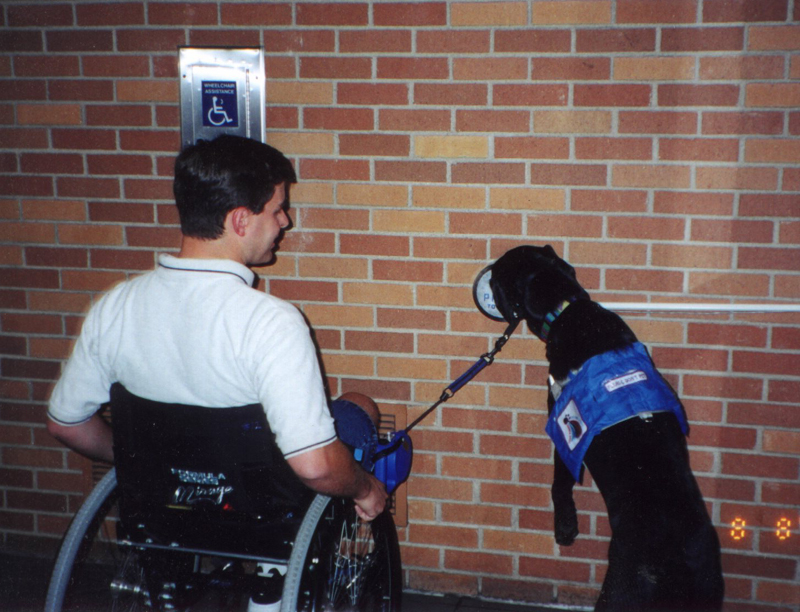
Lightweight vest allows freedom of movement

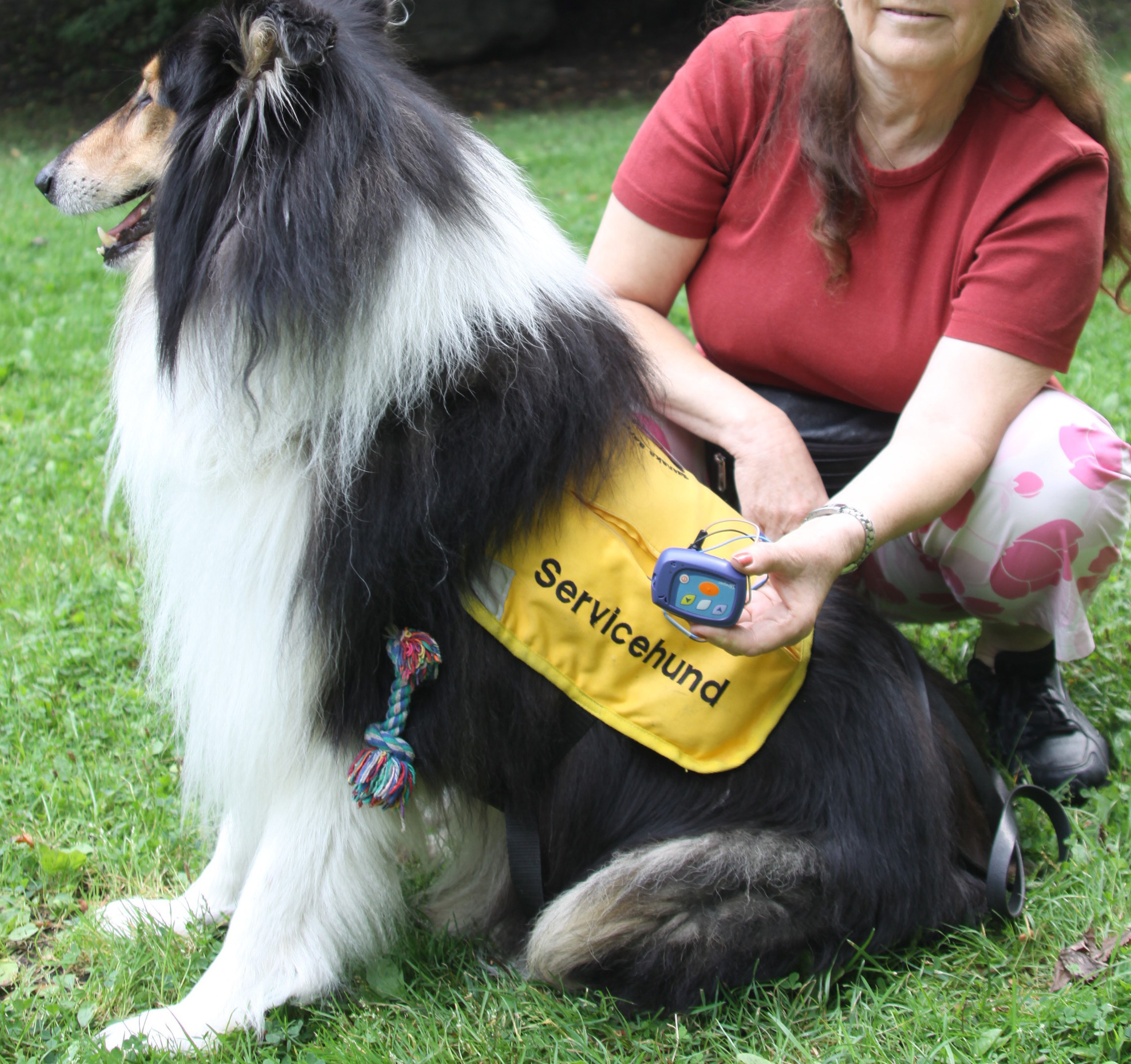
Vest carrying medical supplies for handler

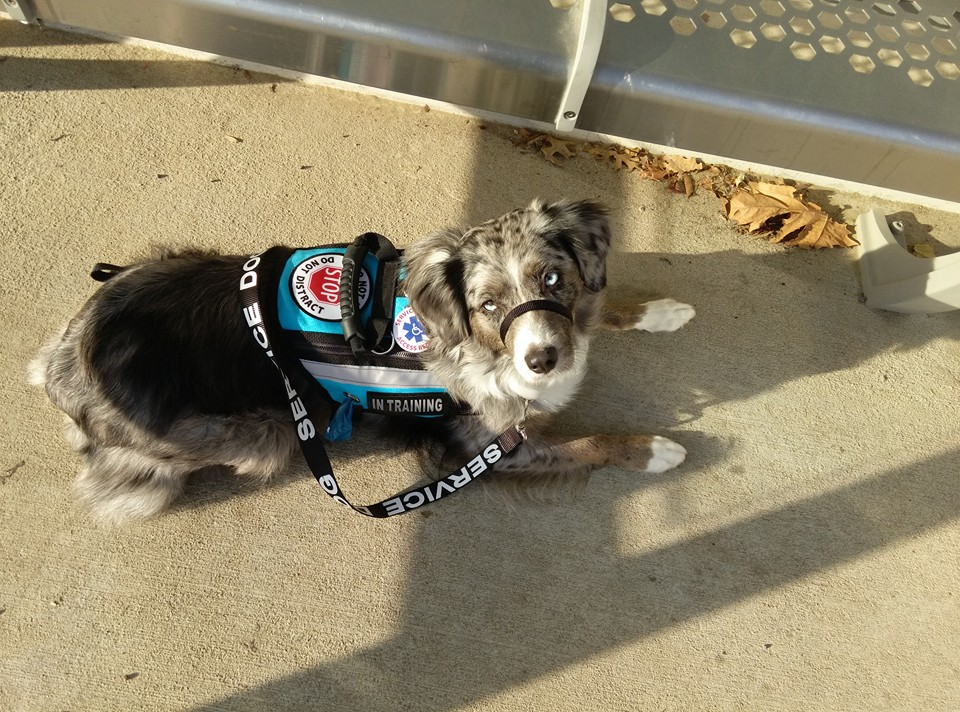
Vest with informational badges and lettered leash

== Guide dog attire ==
Guide dogs wear a snug-fitting harness with a rigid handle. The blind handler receives direction from the dog through the handle. As long as the harness is on, the dog is "on duty".

Examples of guide dog attire
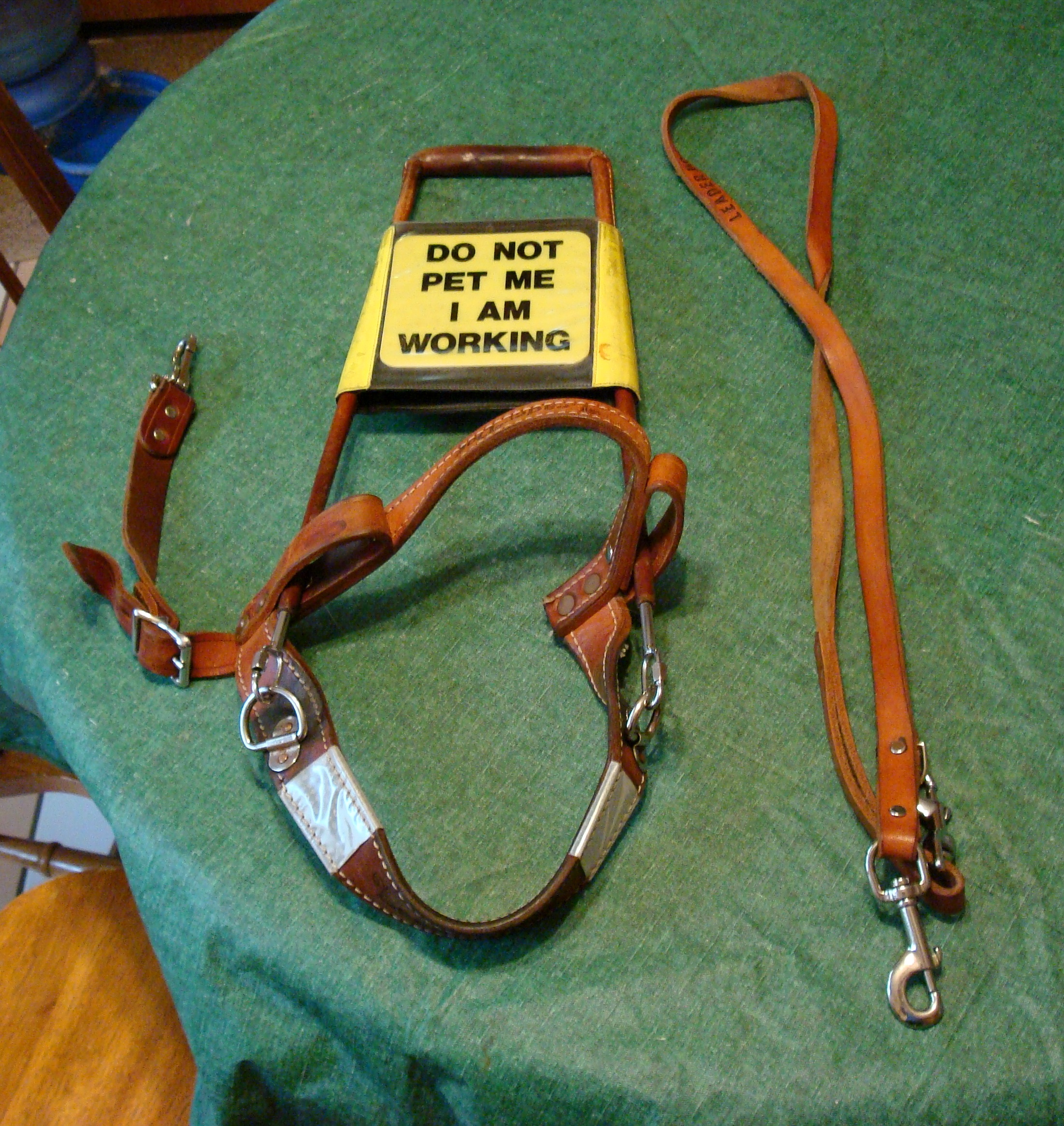
Leather guide dog harness

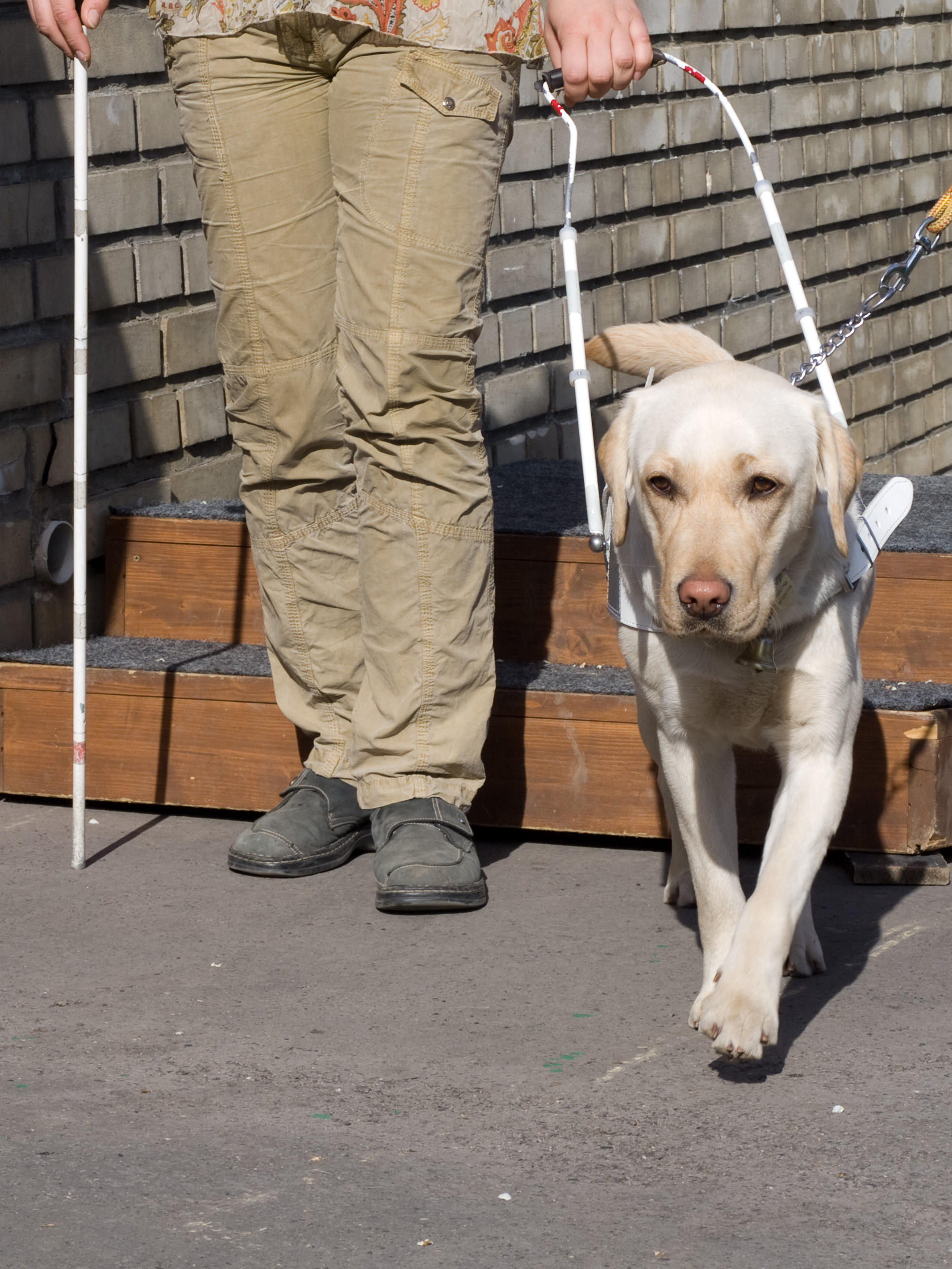
Guide dog harness in use shows angled handle

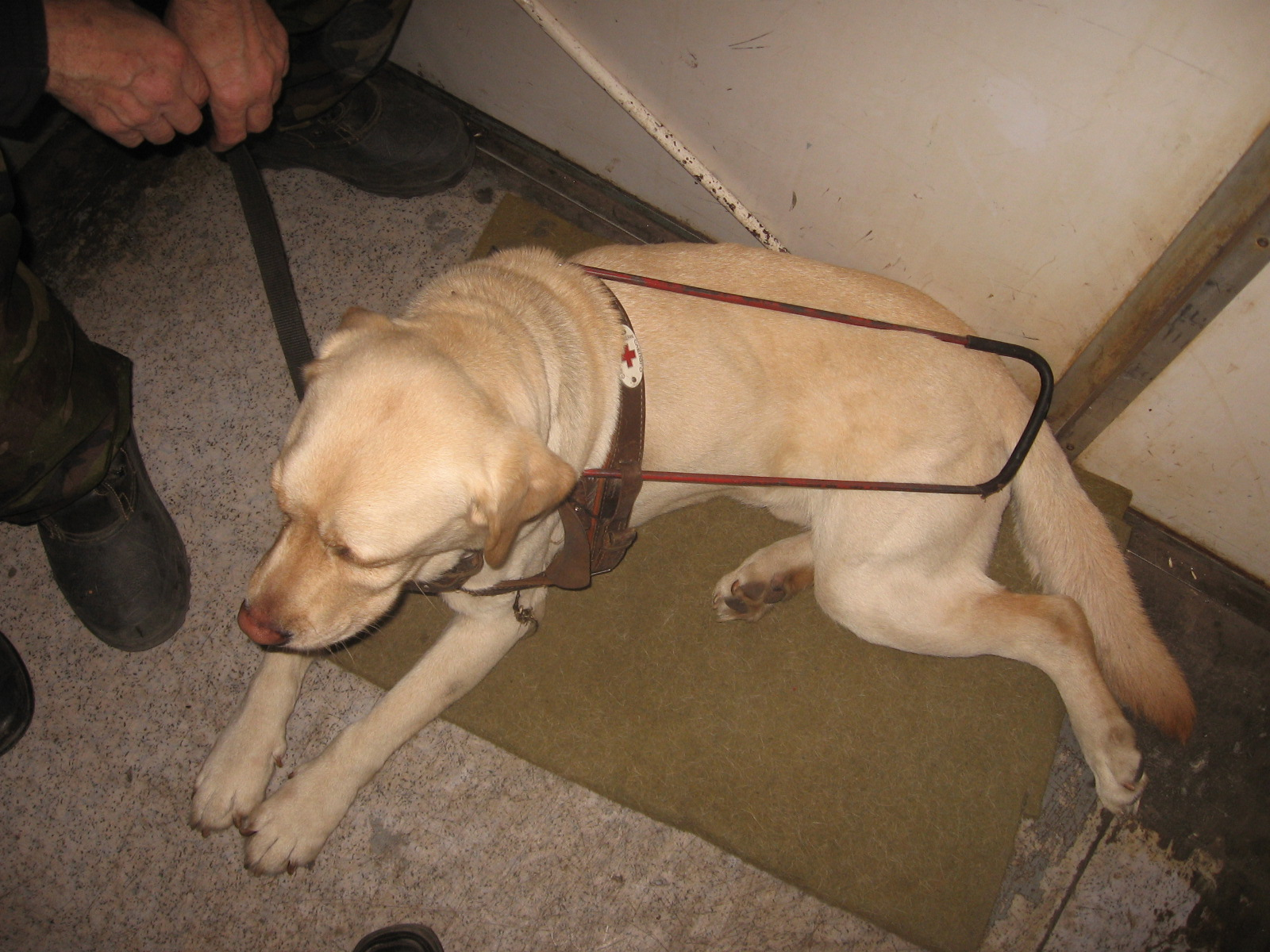
Harness gives freedom to move and lay down

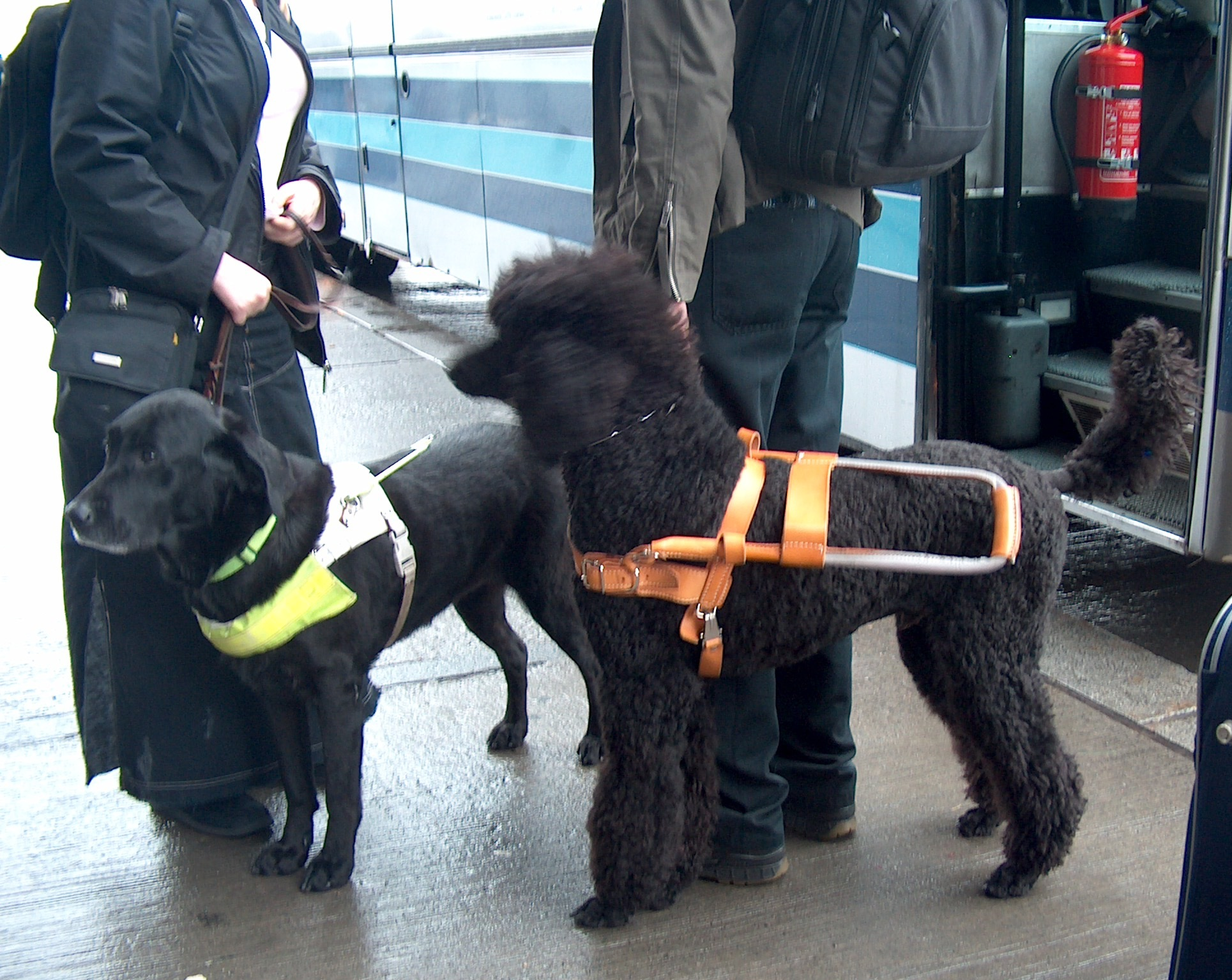
A different style of handle

== Police dog attire ==
Bulletproof vests are available for police dogs and are considered essential equipment by some police officers. Others claim that they are too hot for wearing all shift, or a particular dog who was not trained with such attire may not like to wear one. They are fairly expensive.

Examples of police dog attire
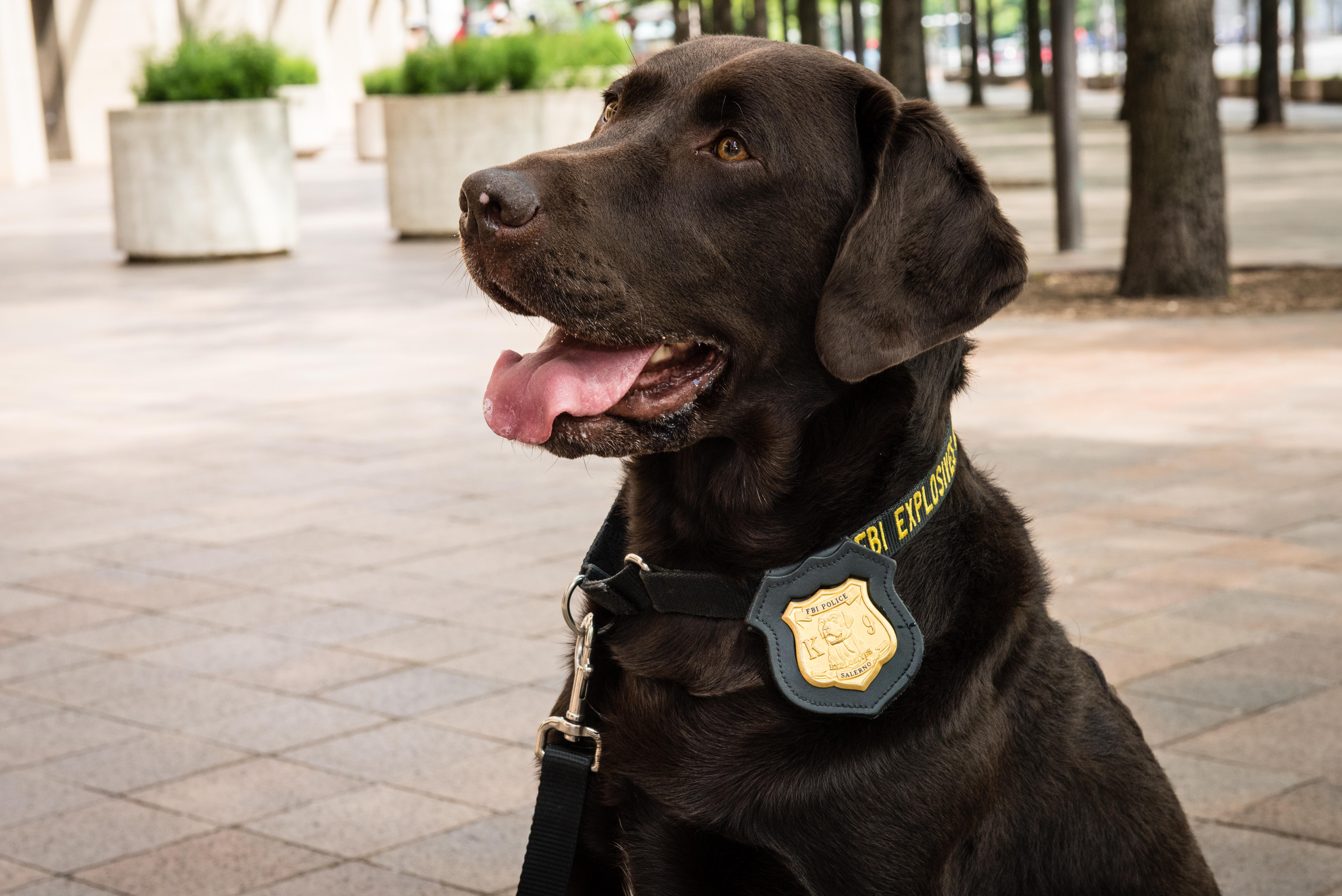
Identifying police badge

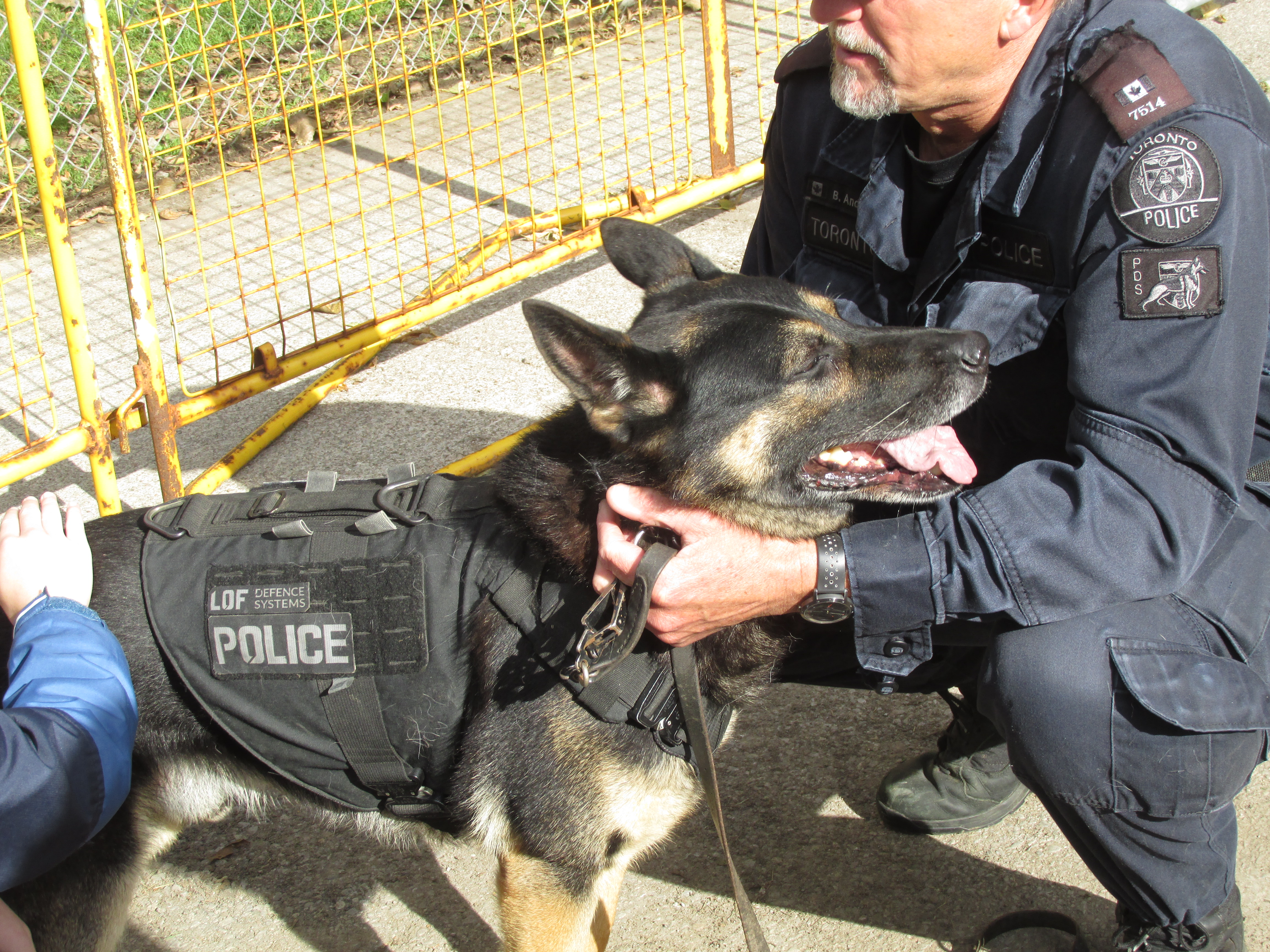
Working vest

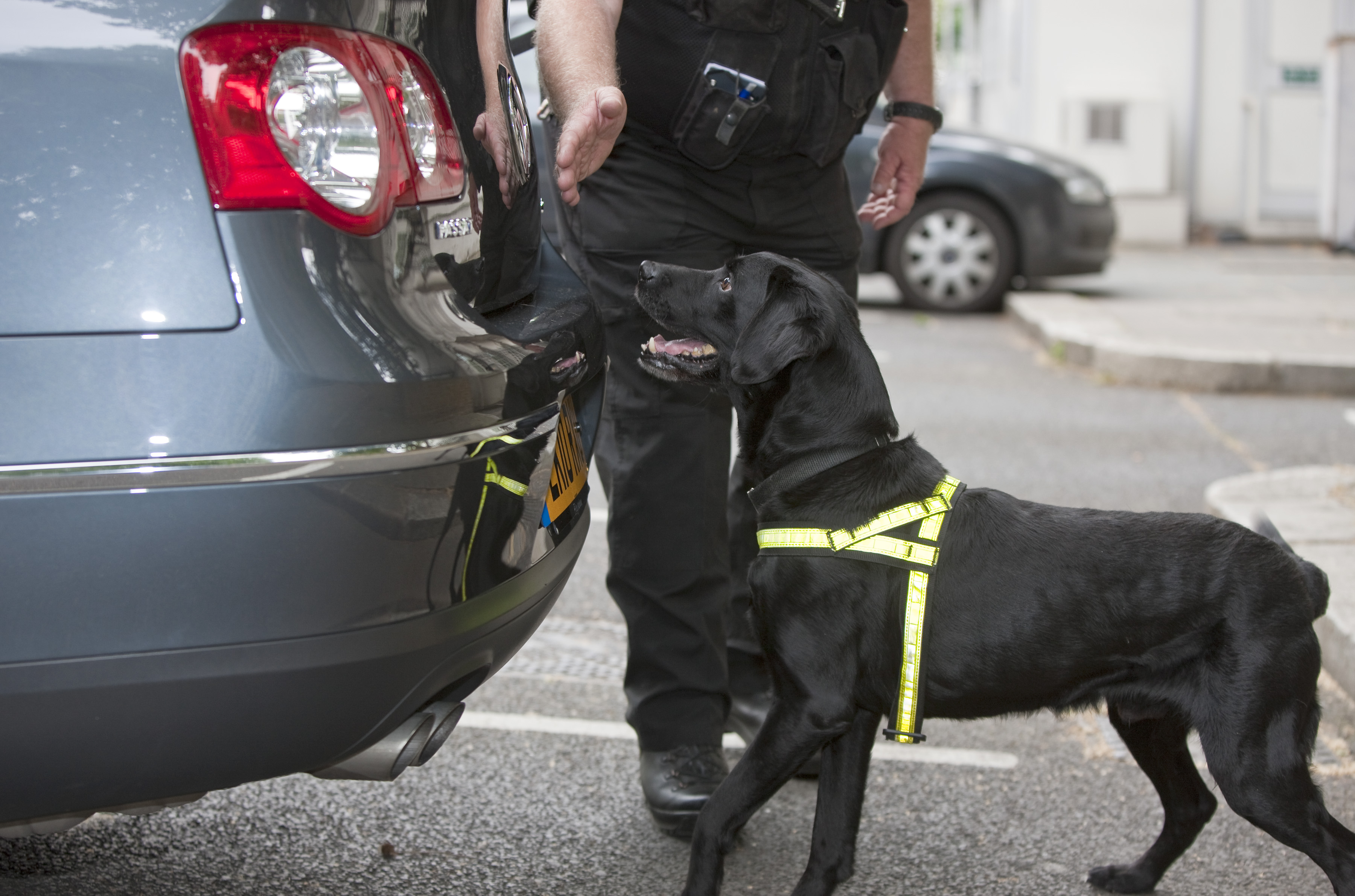
A British police search dog

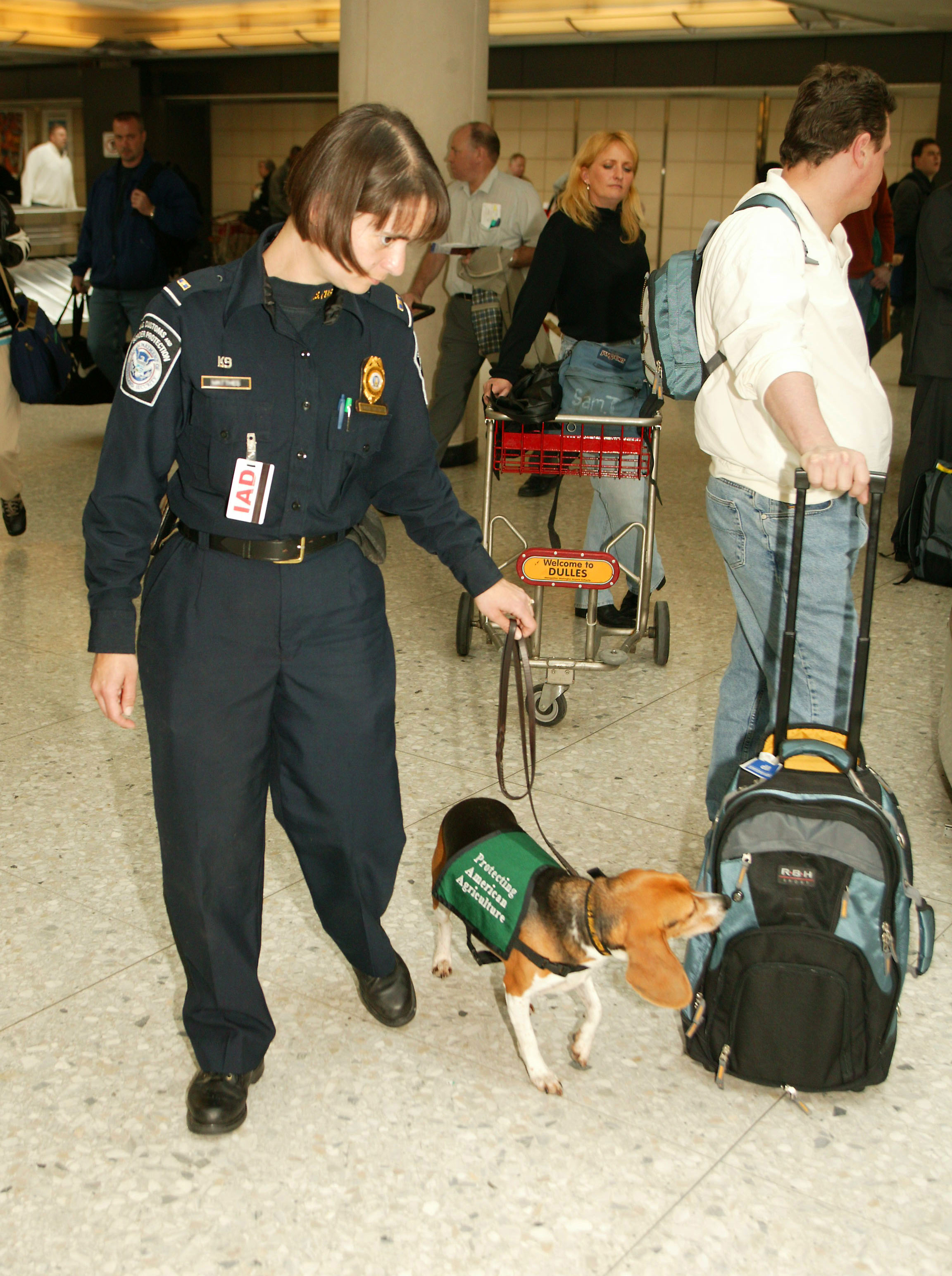
Customs dog in cape at an airport

== Military dog attire ==
Military dogs often wear tactical vests (tac vest for short) which are made of durable fabric for a high activity dog, and are constructed in the MOLLE style.

Ballistic vests for dogs (aka body armour or bulletproof vests) are used by police dogs (K-9) and military dogs. Such vests provide "ballistic and edged weapon protection for vital organs while allowing complete freedom of movement". They are made from similar material as bulletproof vests for humans and are expensive. Specialty body armor such as the $30,000 ones used by the United States Navy SEALs may be waterproof and incorporate night vision cameras and two-way audio.

Examples of military dog attire
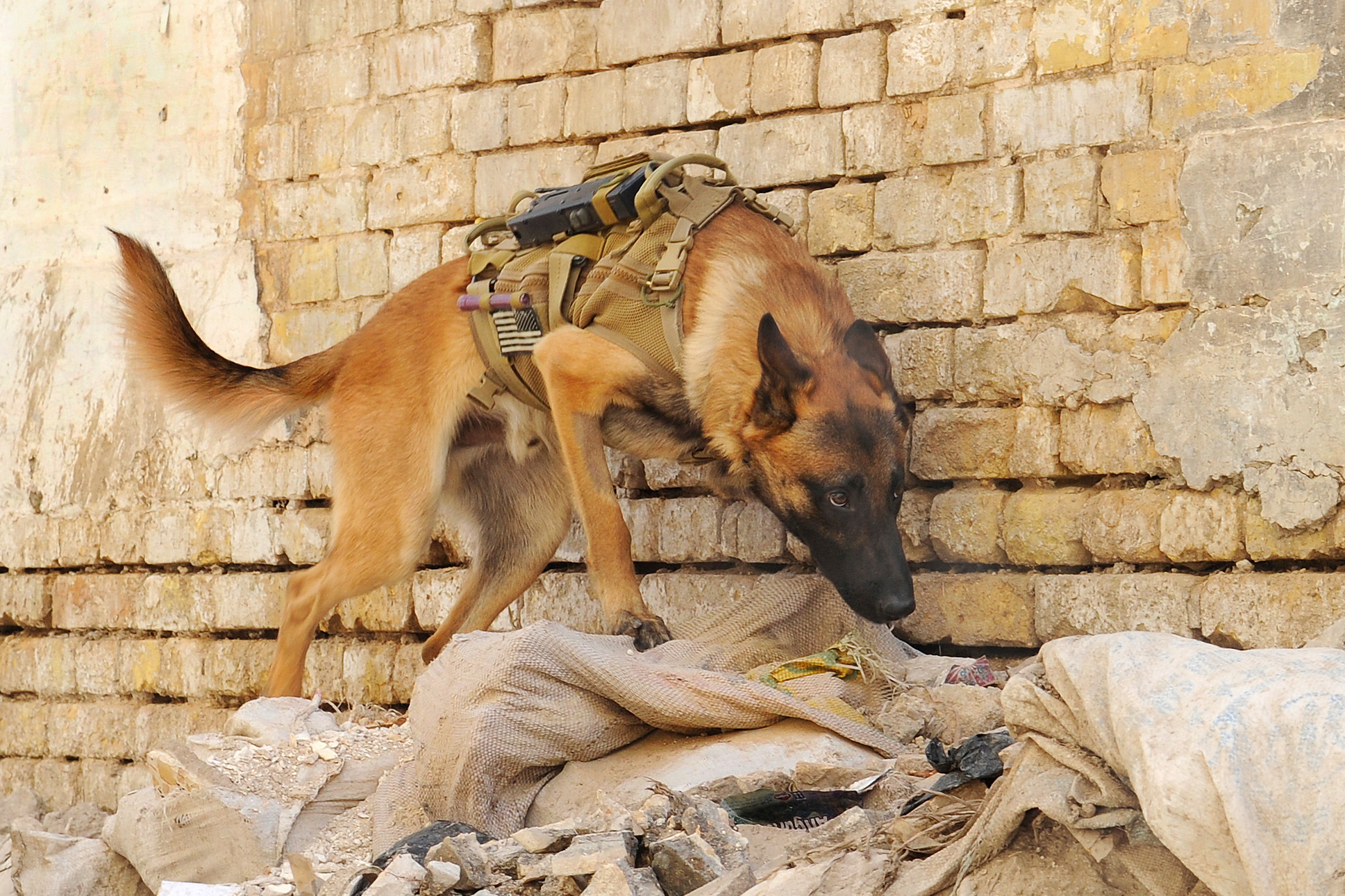
Tactical vest (tacvest) with equipment

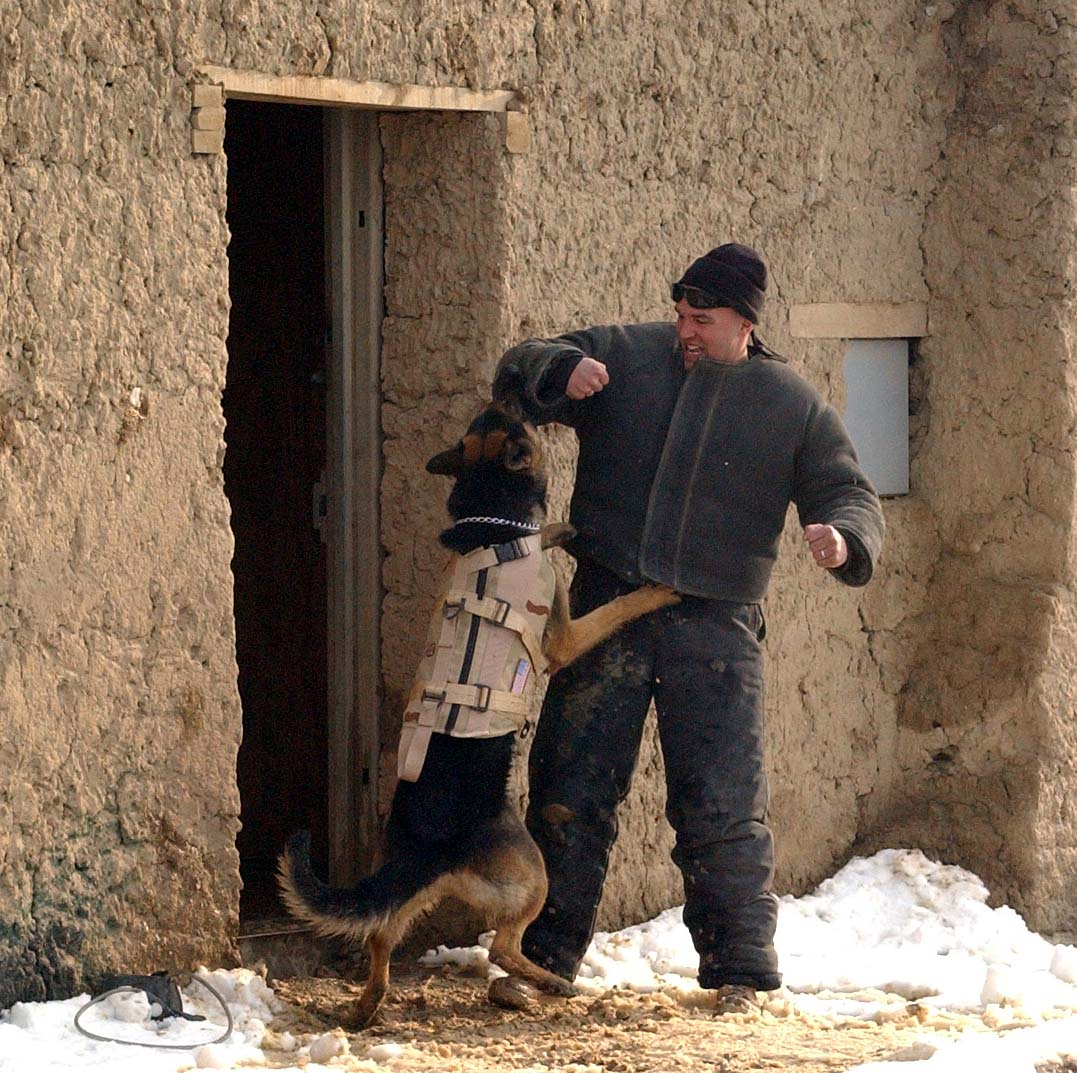
Bullet-proof vest

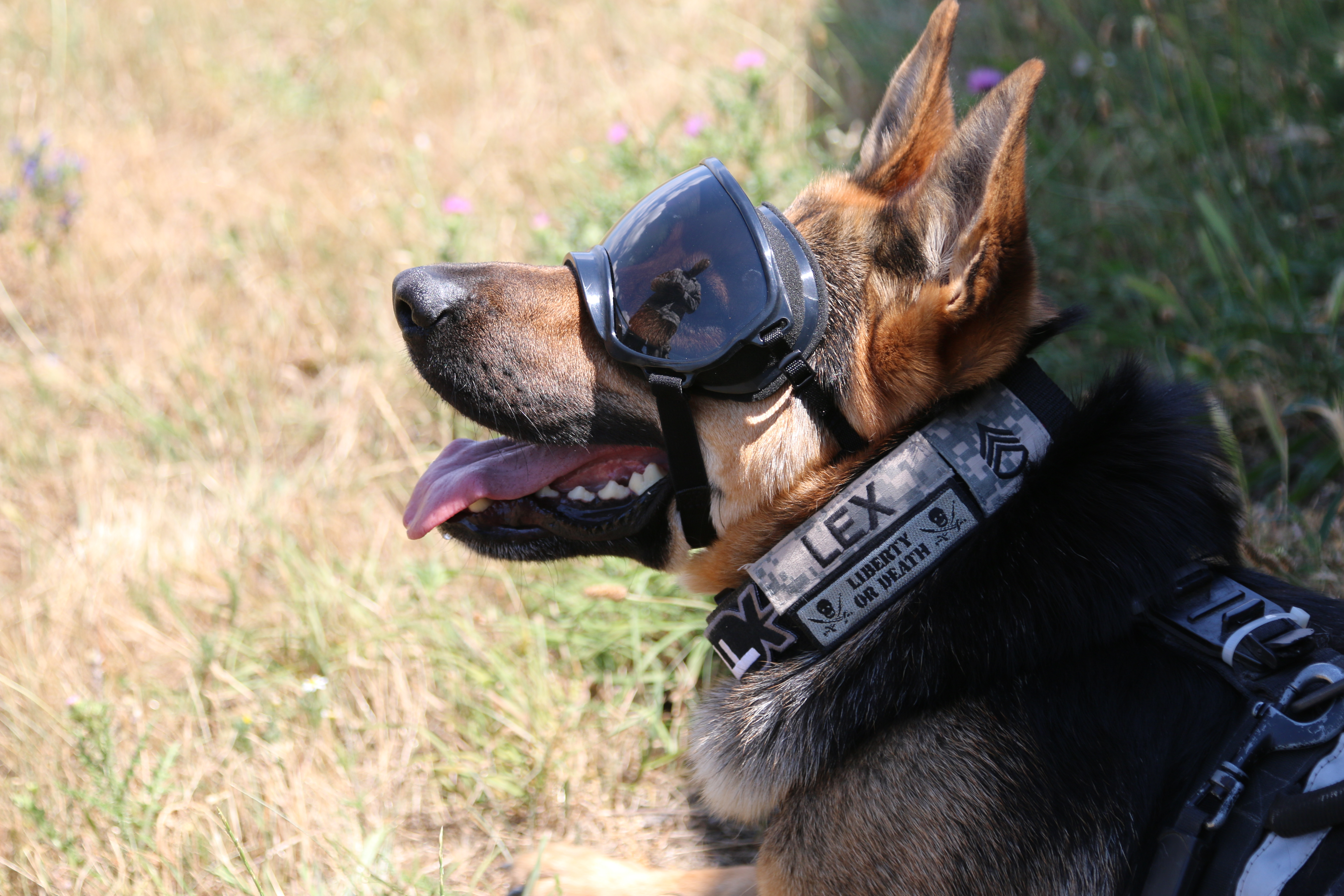
Eye protection

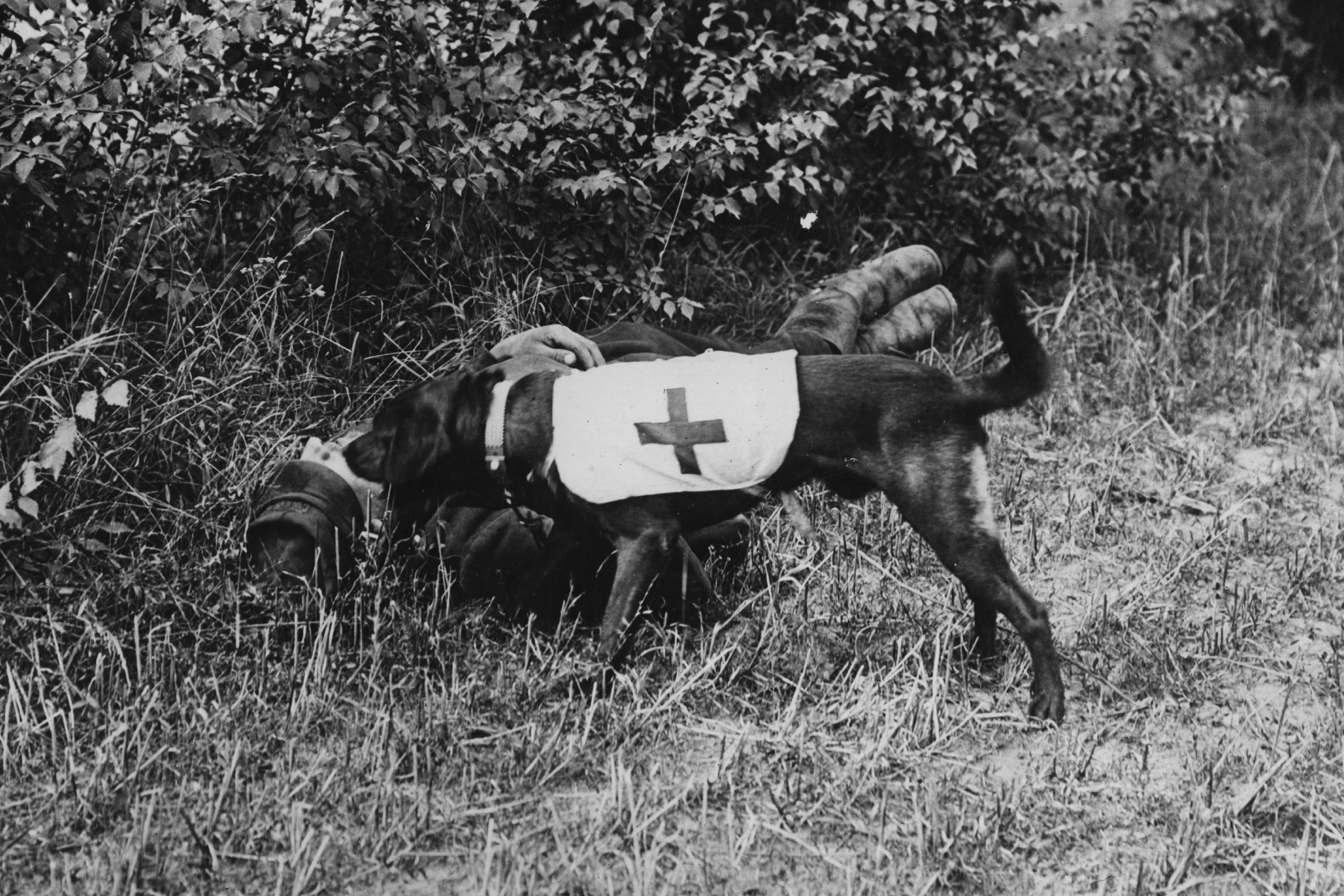
Ambulance dog vest (World War I)

== Search and Rescue dog attire ==
Water rescue dogs typically wear gear that provides extra floatation and "has handles or attachments for tow lines or rescue gear."

Examples of search and rescue (SAR) dog attire
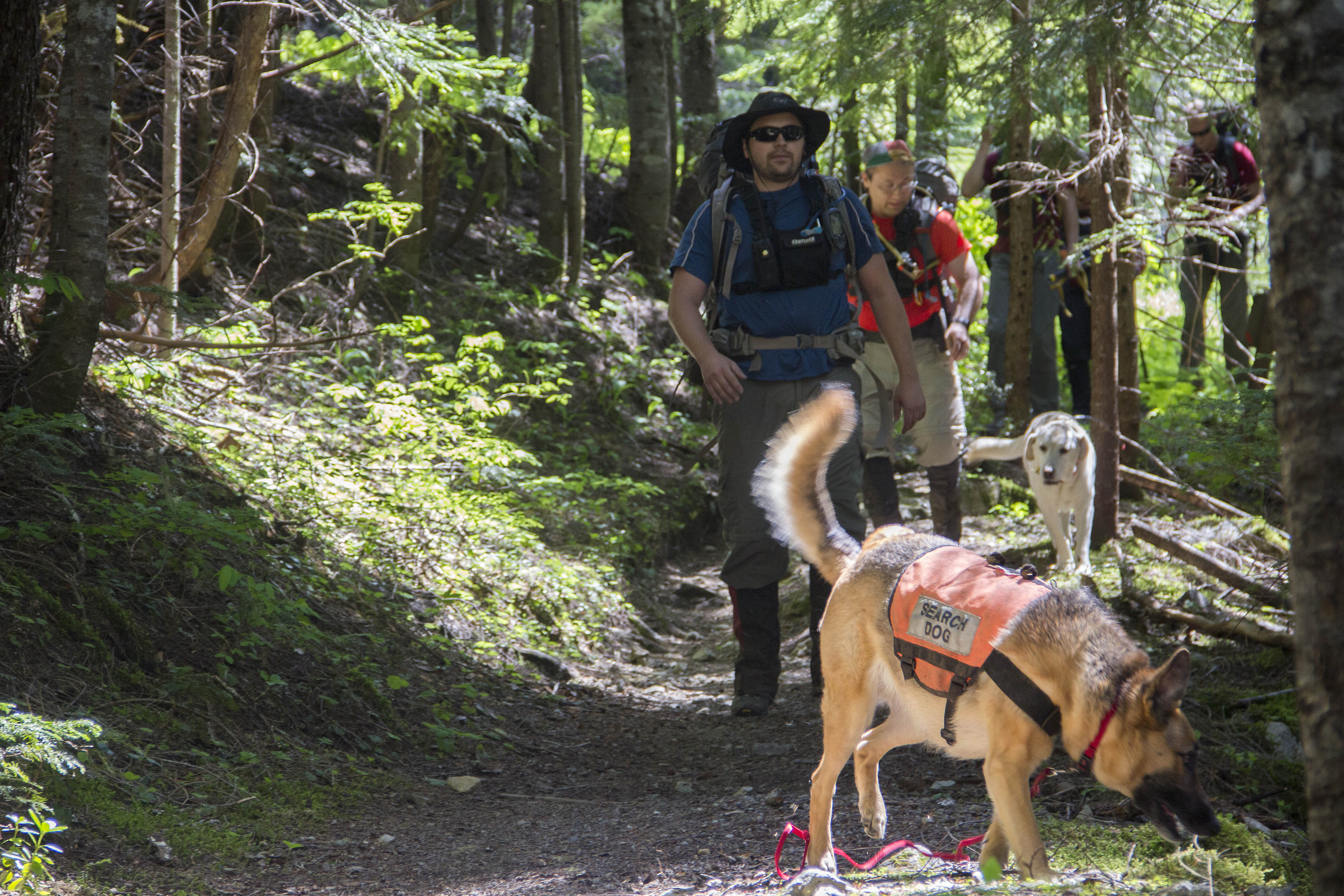
Search and Rescue vest

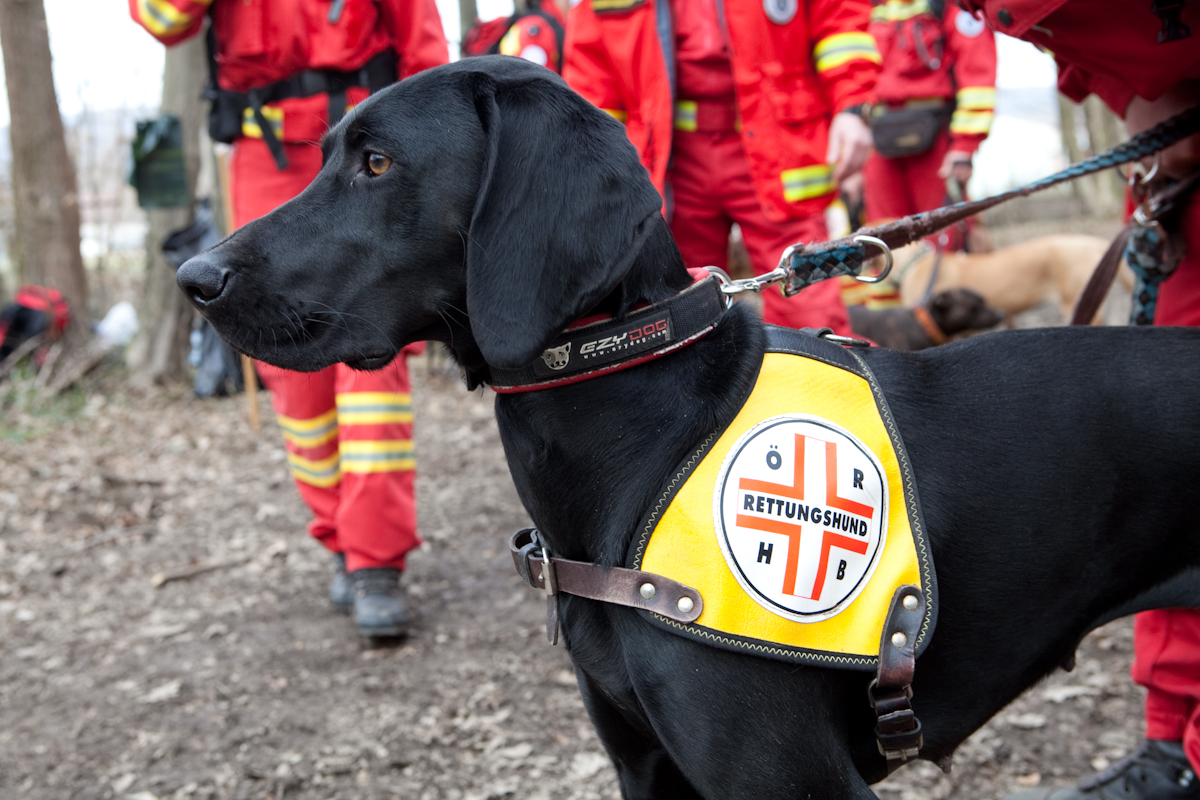
Leather shoulder vest identifying the organization

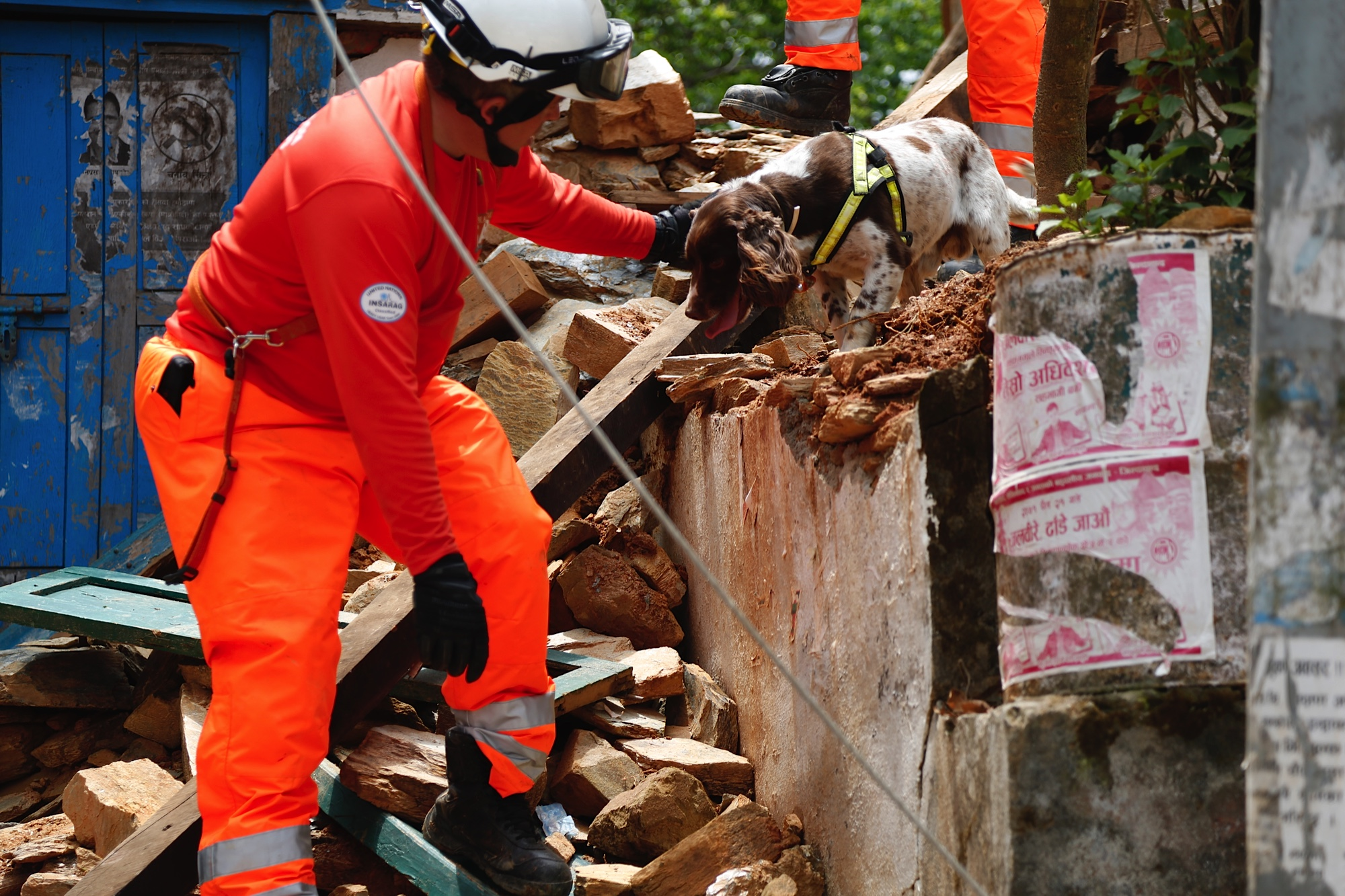
Minimal high-visibility harness

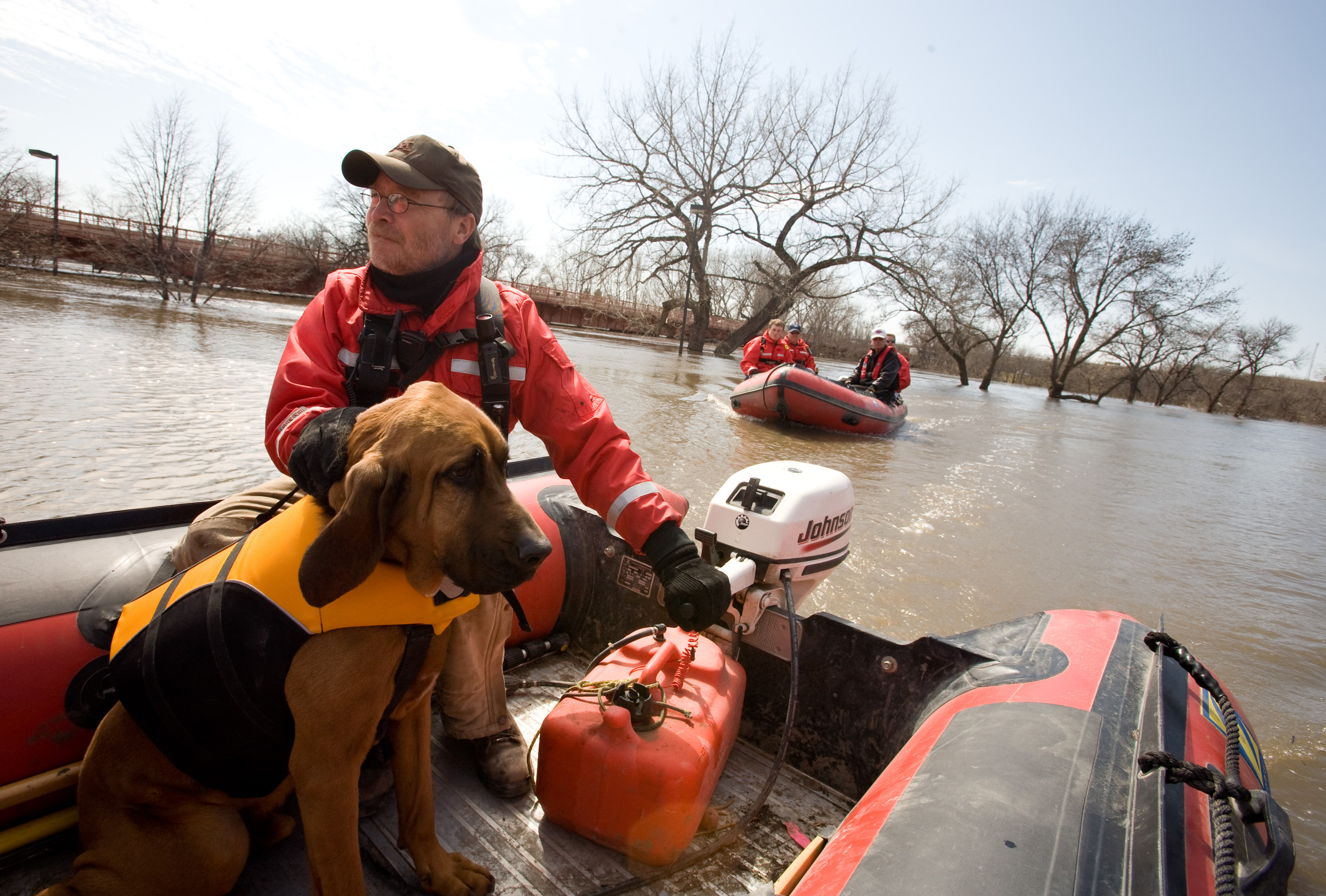
Floatation vest for water rescue
