= Dog harness =

Animal harness for a dog

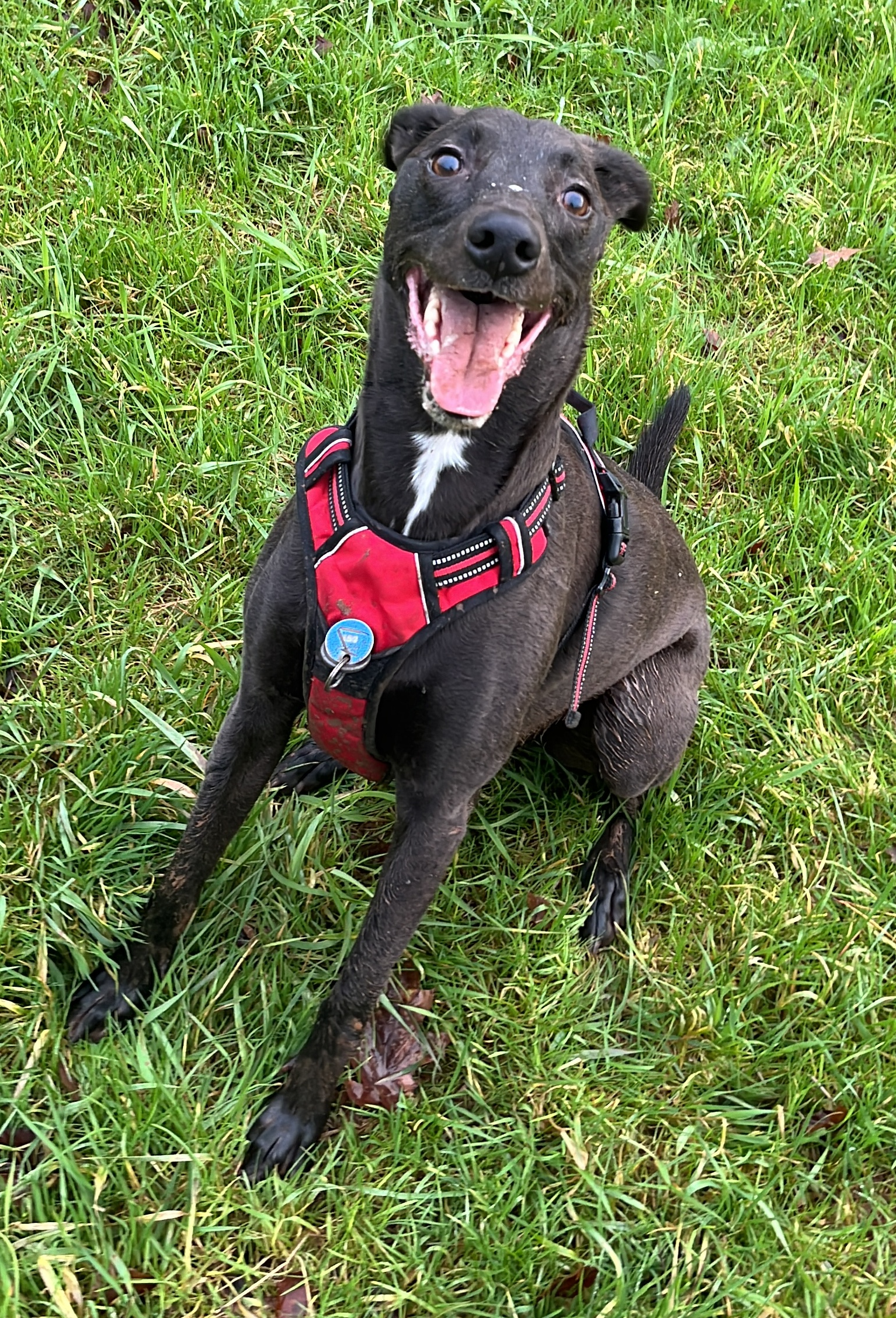
A modern dog chest harness, used for walking of domestic dogs. Attachment rings for a lead are on both the chest and the back.

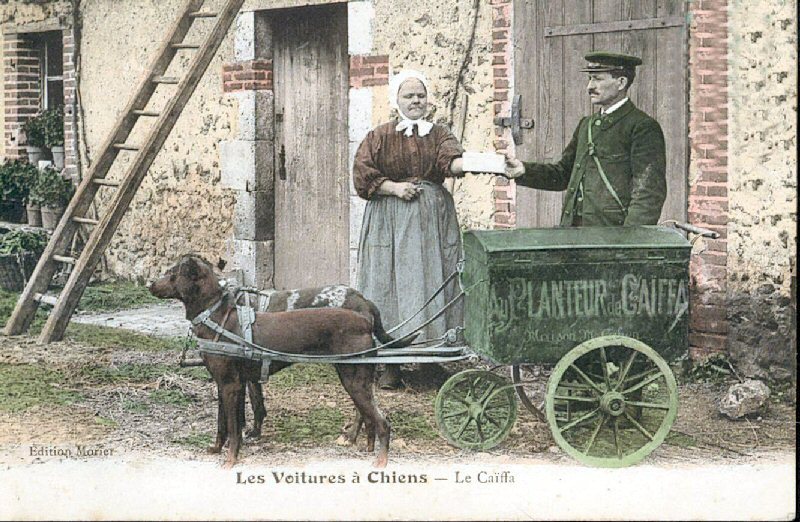
A dog cart drawn by dogs in harness

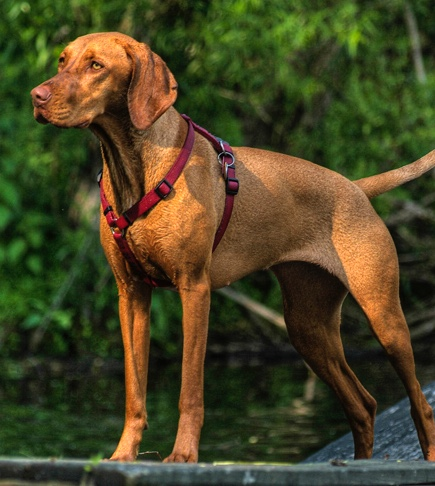
A Vizsla wearing a dog harness of the "shoulder" or "half-harness" style, typically used for hiking, trail walks, and canicross.

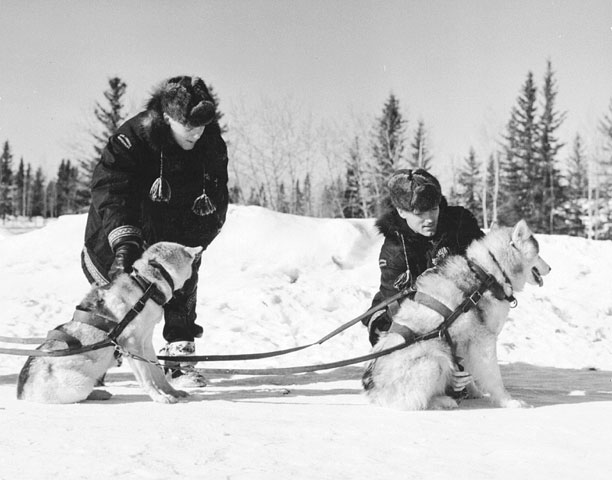
Sled dogs wearing traditional leather H-back style sledding harnesses (1957).

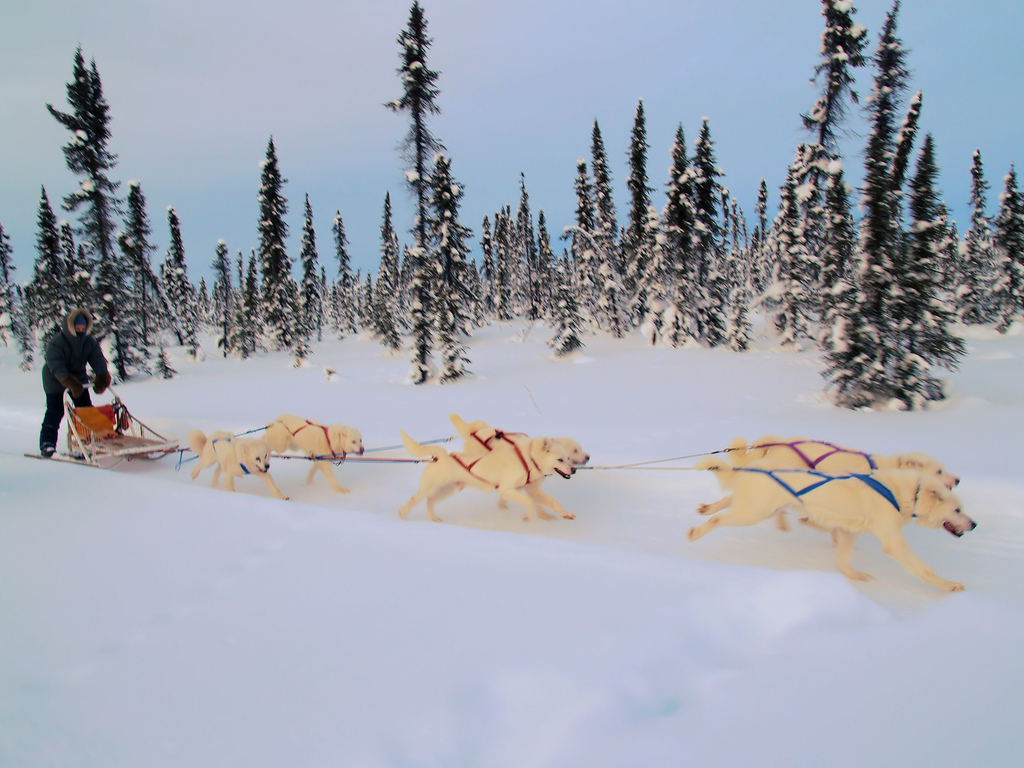
Sledding huskies wearing X-back style sled dog harnesses

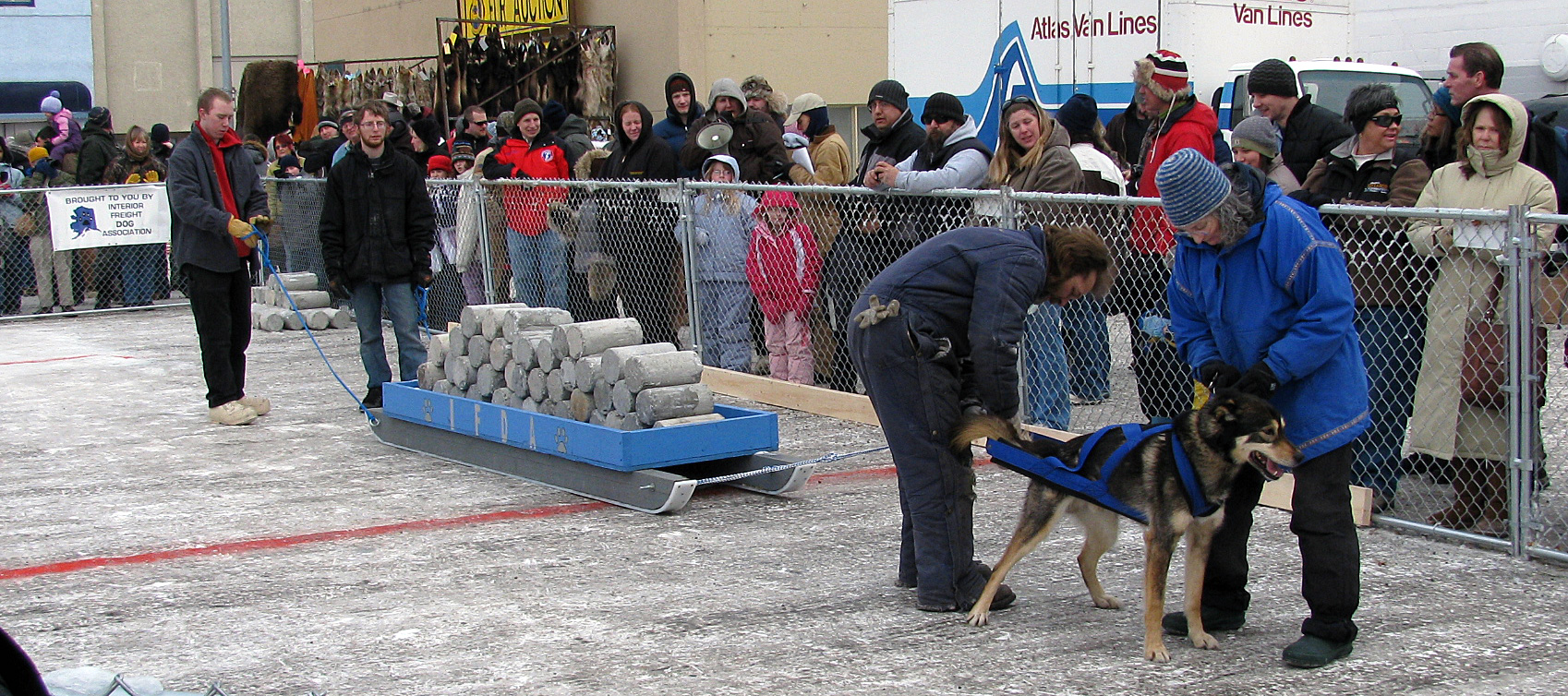
A dog participating in a weight-pull competition, wearing a weight-pull style sled harness.

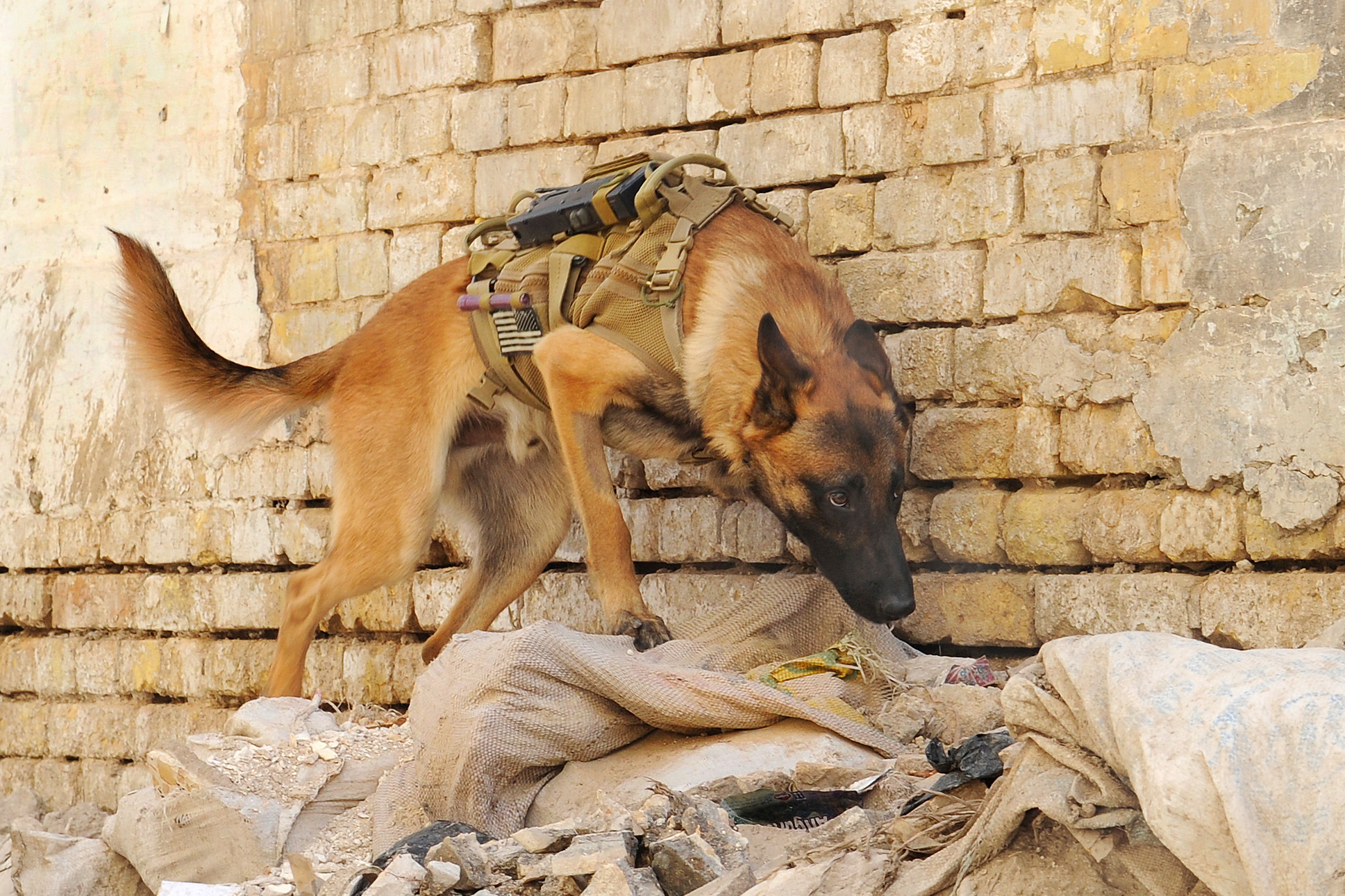
A military dog wearing tactical vest (tacvest)

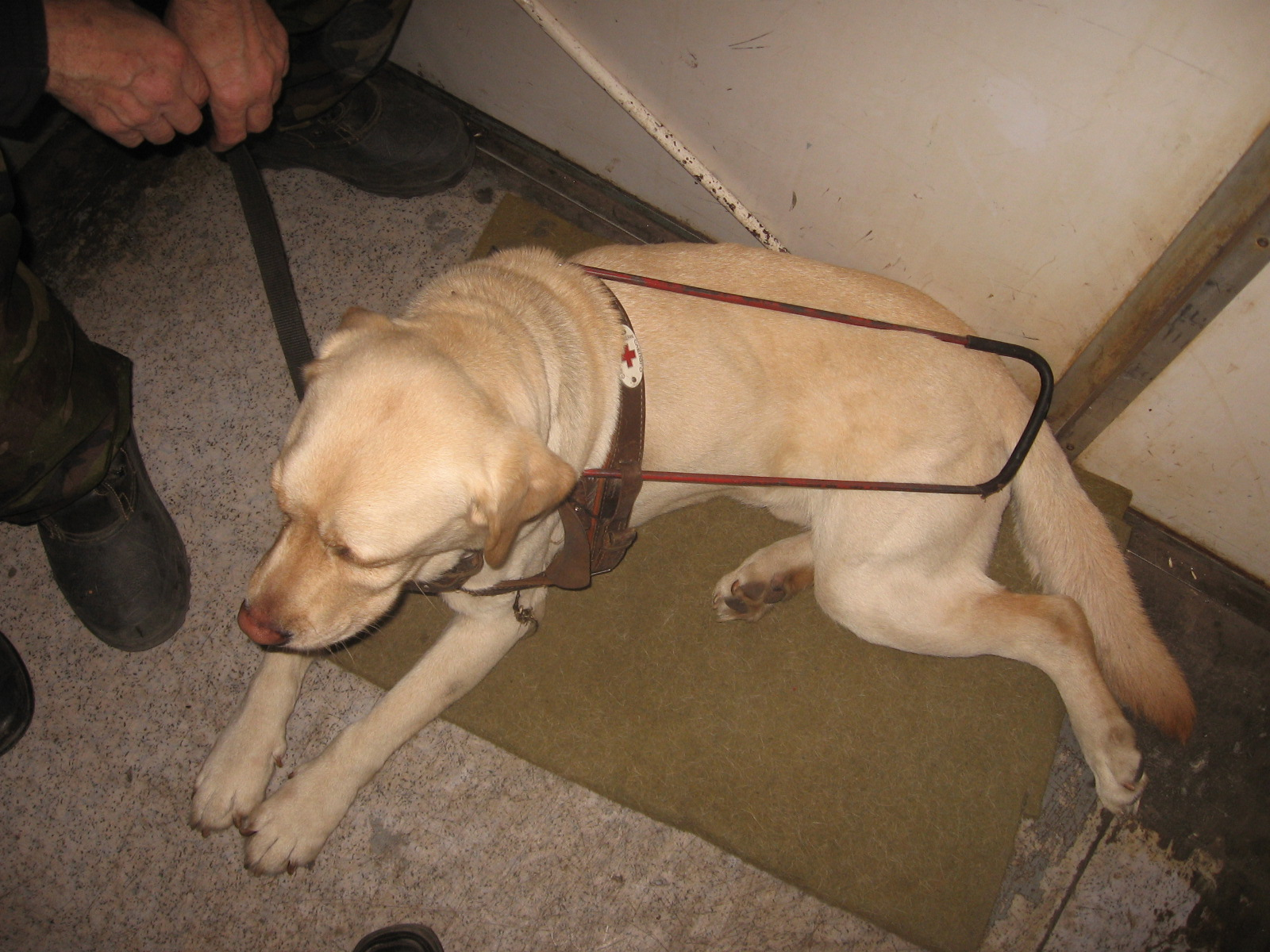
An assistance dog wearing a harness with a rigid handle

A dog harness is a piece of equipment consisting in part of straps that surround the dog’s torso. It is used to guide, hold, and lift the dog or to utilise its pulling power. It reduces tension on the neck when they pull, and provides free breathing during daily walks. In sports such as mushing and skijoring, where the dog's pulling power is utilized, the harness provides effective use of force while maintaining freedom of movement. These aforementioned kinds of harnesses differ from pet harnesses in that they are specifically designed in order to allow or support a dog in the completion of a working task.

== History ==
Harnesses have been used for millennia to carry weight or pull small carriages or sleds. In both World War I and World War II, service and rescue dogs wore harnesses.

Archeological evidence shows that humans bred dogs for pulling sleds some 10,000 years ago. Artifacts, including rings and parts that connect reins to sleds, have been found on sites throughout the northernmost stretches of mainland and on arctic islands.

== Types of harnesses ==
=== No-pull harness ===
No-pull harnesses rely on a level of discomfort, force and avoidance to alter the dogs behavior. When the dog pulls, a strap within the harness tightens. applying pressure on the dog's body which the dog must actively alter the pulling behavior to avoid. If the dog pulls, the leash goes off to the side and directs the dog back towards the owner. That gives a greater ability to control and guide the dog by applying a little pressure.

=== Chest harness ===
The chest harness is fastened to the dog’s body with a chest strap and a girth strap. The chest strap extends horizontally at the level of the sternum, between the two shoulder joints. The chest harness is available in both saddle and non-saddle versions. This type of harness is easy to put on. The materials used are straps with leather, nylon or even polar or neoprene lining. This type of harness originates from ancient China, its first depictions on draft animals date back to around 150 B.C. Wandering, conquering peoples, such as the Avars, Huns, Hungarians, played a major role in its spread in Europe. It is still used on horses to drive carriages on normal, light terrain. A beautiful example of this is the four-horse statue on top of the Brandenburg Gate in Berlin. Nowadays, among horse riders, the chest harness is the most used in the field of coachman leisure activities due to its simplicity. It is less suitable for pulling heavy loads, as the bearing area of the strap is smaller than that of “hames” harnesses. In the case of pulling load, the chest harness is less effective than hames (Y-shaped) harnesses because the strength of the dog’s muscles near the spine and hind legs is not effectively utilised. As a result, the chest harness is not used at all in pulling sports that involve dogs. The benefits of the harness type are very noticeable in everyday, urban use, and they are also often used in the world of service dogs. By using a harness that keeps the neck area free when the dog is pulling on the leash or needs to be pulled back you can avoid putting pressure on the trachea, which restricts breathing and can cause tracheal collapse in the case of dogs that are prone to it. To prevent this, the chest harness serves as an alternative to the collar, which is essential for dogs prone to tracheal collapse.

=== Y-harness ===
The straps of the Y-harness are located between the neck and shoulder joints and surround the dog’s neck - creating a y-shape when viewed from the front. This gives the dog the highest freedom of movement. Due to its structure, it is more complicated to put on and take off than chest harnesses. There are two main types of these, ones built for everyday use and those used for racing or running (such as sledding). They do not encourage pulling.

=== Sled dog harness ===
Harnesses used by sled dogs for running, cycling, sledding, skijoring or pulling weight. There are several different types of harness available for sled dogs. Some common harness types: X-back, H-back, half-harness, and spreader bar harness. The X-back style harness is the typical choice for recreational and sprint/mid-distance mushers, due to their lightweight and durable make, ease of accessibility and fit customization, as well as the speed at which they can be put on and taken off dogs. Half-harnesses are believed by some mushers to result in fewer athletic injuries, and are used by some long-distance mushers in place of the traditional X-back. A harness with thicker lining and a wider chest strap is preferred for pulling heavy weights. They feature more overall padding and extend further behind the dog (no more than 24 inches from the base of the tail in weight-pull competition). It has been designed to help the dog pull heavier loads safely and efficiently, and may feature a spreader bar behind the wheel dogs and in front of the sled or cart. These harnesses help distribute the weight of the cargo over a broader area of the body.

=== Rehabilitation and lifting harness ===
There are several types of rehabilitation or dog lifting harnesses depending on which parts of the dog's body needs help. It is a harness with at least one handle that wraps around a dog's body to allow a person to help lift the weight off of their hips, spine or legs. There are several different types of them available, each of them providing their own unique advantages. They include: front harnesses, rear harnesses, front and rear combo, mid-section support harnesses, amputee harnesses and full body harnesses. There are several conditions that may make it necessary or at least helpful to use a dog lifting harness, some of the most common being: hip dysplasia, broken bones, sprained knees, spine injuries, arthritis, recent surgery, strained muscles and missing limbs.

=== Tactical dog harness ===
A tactical dog vest or harness provides an extra layer of protection that is needed. Most tactical dog vests are provided with a handle to help the dog on difficult terrain. It can also be used to hold additional devices, such as a GPS tracker or a light. Further specialization is possible depending on needs: bulletproof; suitable for descent; mantrailing harness, etc.

=== Assistance dog harness ===
Assistance dogs typically wear a vest, cape or harness for identification. The gear is often utilized during the dog's work. Cape harnesses are ergonomic and well-made. Usually there is ample space for identification patches. The pulling harnesses are worn by service dogs who need to pull heavy weight. Pulling harnesses are usually padded for comfort. Mobility support harnesses are for assistance dogs who need to pull their owners. They are ergonomic and have a rigid handle.

=== Car safety harnesses ===
Safety harnesses were designed to restrain the animal in a car seat using the car's seat belt. In the event of an accident the harness distributes the pulling force. Several car safety harness have been designed that pass crash tests conducted in the United States by the Center for Pet Safety.

== See also ==
- Dog collar
- Pet harness
- Cape (dog)
