= Pet harness =

Animal harness for a pet

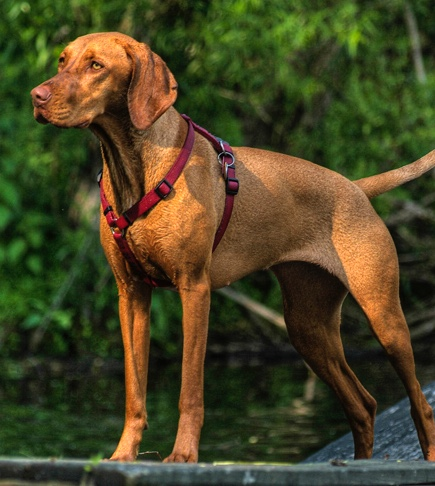
A dog harness

A pet harness is equipment consisting of straps of webbing that loop around the torso of an animal and fasten together using side release buckles.

These harnesses are generally made to have both a strap on the chest in front of the forelimbs and a strap around the torso behind the forelimbs, with straps in between connecting these two. Having a D-ring suitable for pet tags and a leash to clip to, they are most often used to restrain an animal, but dogs also particularly wear them to assist a person with a disability or haul people and items. There is also the lifting harness for dogs with disabilities.

Harnesses come in different sizes, although many are size-adjustable with tri-glide slides to loosen or shorten the straps' length. The straps may come in a range of different colors, and some have reflective coating.

== For physical restraint ==
The most common use of the pet harness is for physically restraining an animal. When used as such, the harness is worn in conjunction with a leash; one end of the leash has a metal clip that is attached to the ring on the harness, while the other end is typically a loop held by the human.

While a collar only encircles the neck, harnesses have loops that surround the thorax. This design allows for the distribution of force, which reduces pressure placed on the animal's trachea, and therefore, possesses a significantly lower risk of strangulation. Harnesses also possess a much lesser chance of said animal slipping out than possible if it wears a collar. As such, collars have largely been replaced by harnesses.

Pet clothing frequently sports a properly-placed buttonhole for the D-ring of the harness worn under the garment.

Some harnesses, such as those worn by police dogs, may have a handle so they can be restrained (or lifted) by hand more securely. Such harness (or vest) may bear identification and have bulletproof padding.

Pets that might have harnesses

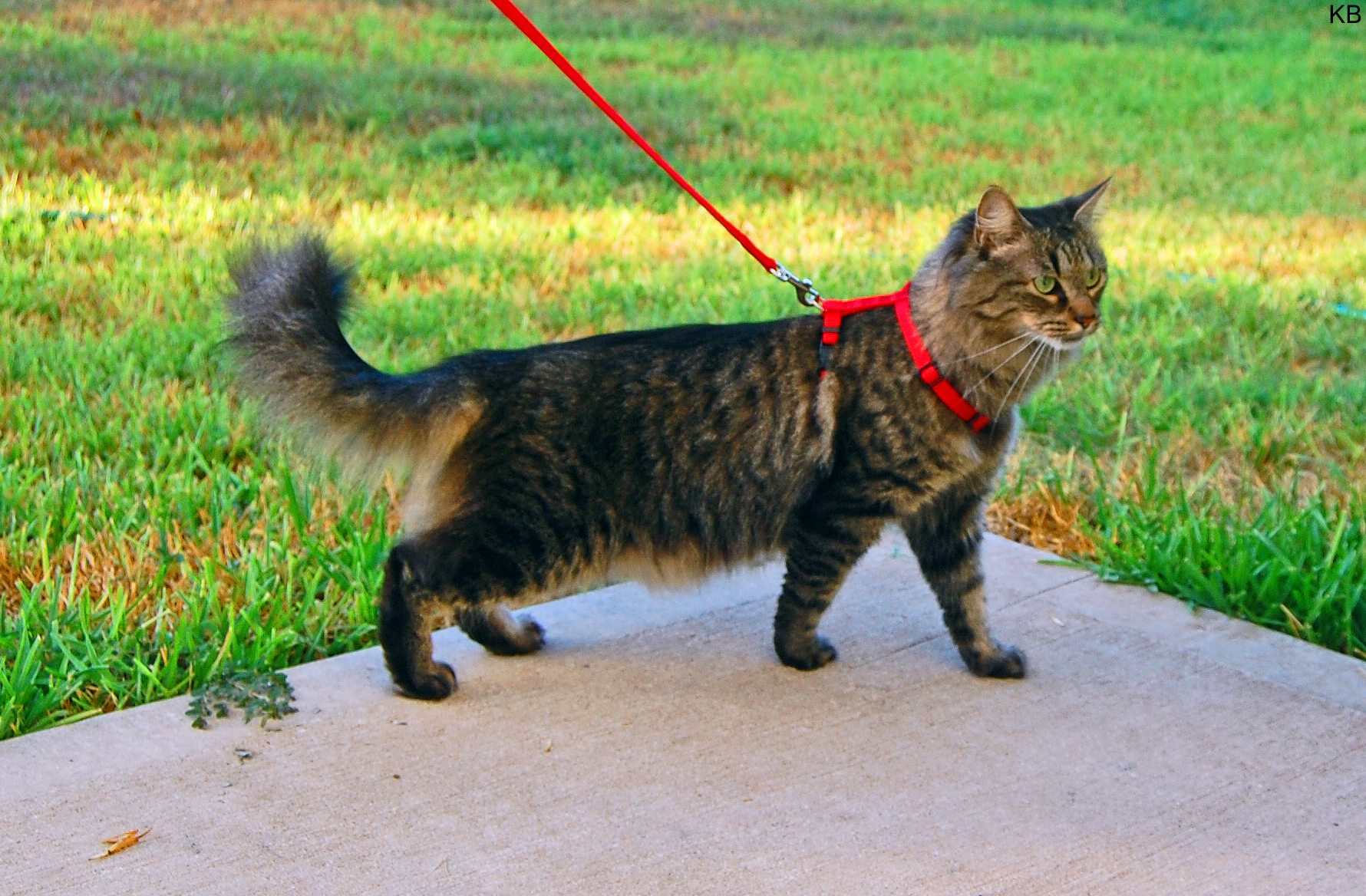
Cat

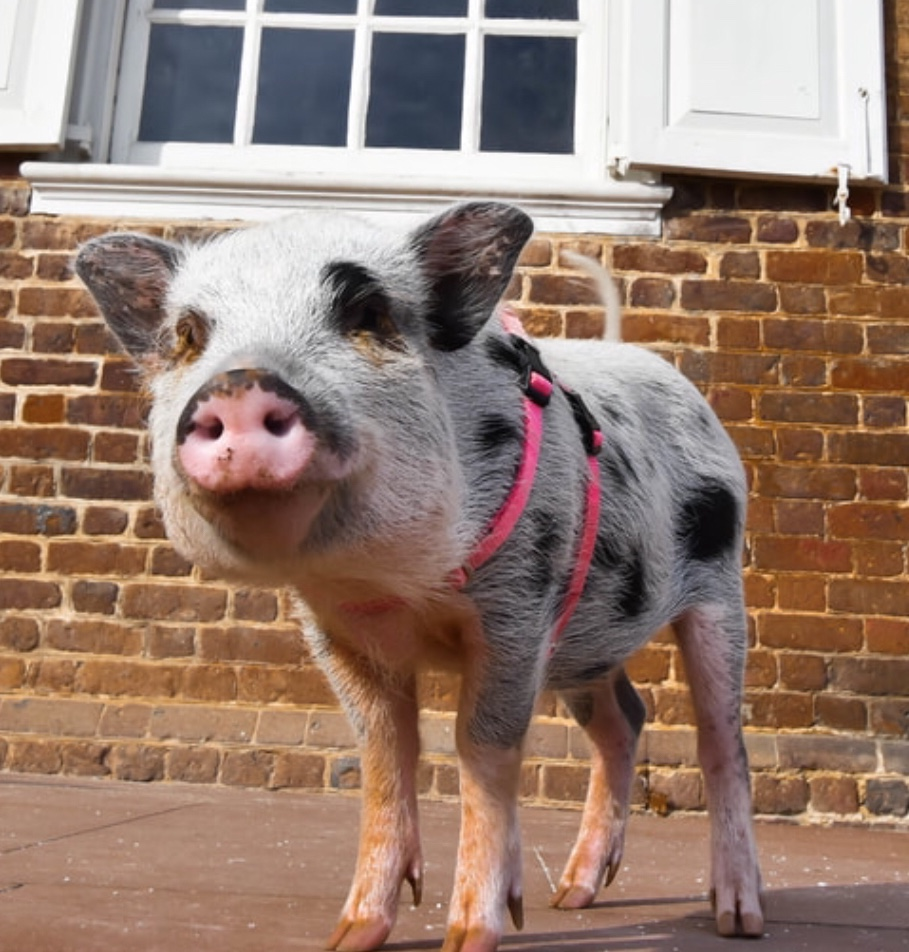
Small pig

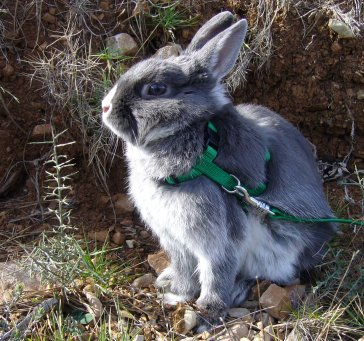
Rabbit

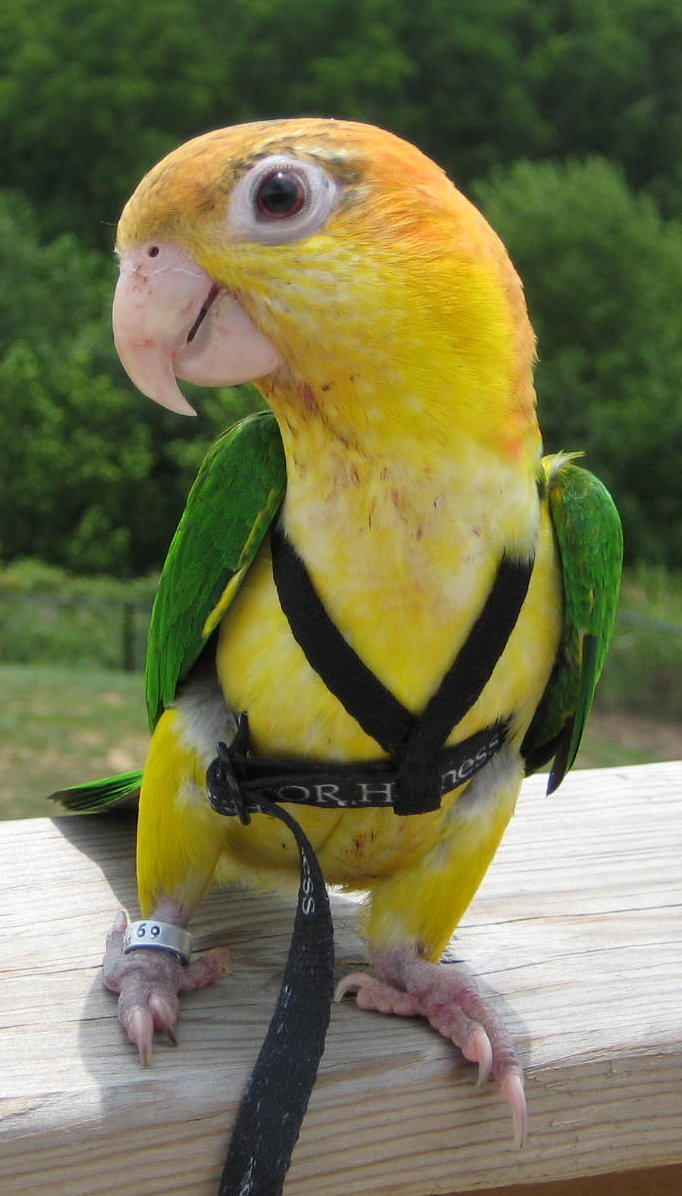
Parrot

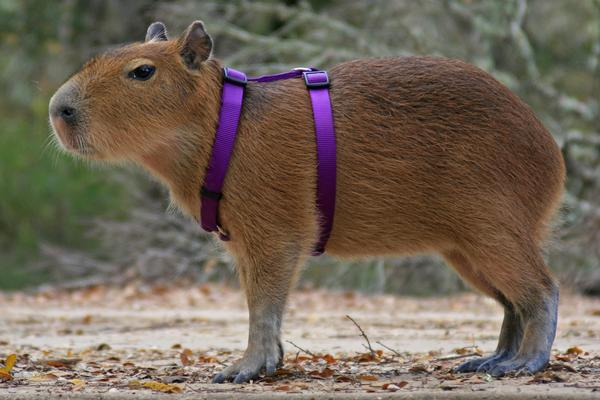
Capybara

== Car safety harnesses ==
Safety harnesses designed for use in an automobile restrain the animal in a car seat using the car's seat belt. These harnesses are marketed as reducing the risk of injury to a pet that is riding in a vehicle during a traffic collision. The harnesses are also said to keep the pet from distracting the driver, or escaping from a vehicle. The Center for Pet Safety found "a 100-percent failure rate to protect either the consumer or the dog [or other animal]" in a 2013 crash test study of existing car safety harnesses. Since then, several car safety harness have been designed that pass crash tests conducted by the Center for Pet Safety.

In 2012, New Jersey became the first US state to pass a bill that requires dog and cat owners to restrain their animals while traveling in a moving vehicle. Since the bill's passing, all pets not traveling in a crate and not wearing a safety harness can earn the violator a fine of up to $1,000 and/or six months in prison.

== See also ==
- Dog collar
- Dog fashion
- Dog harness
- Bird flight harness
