= Leash =

Device for controlling children, dogs and other animals

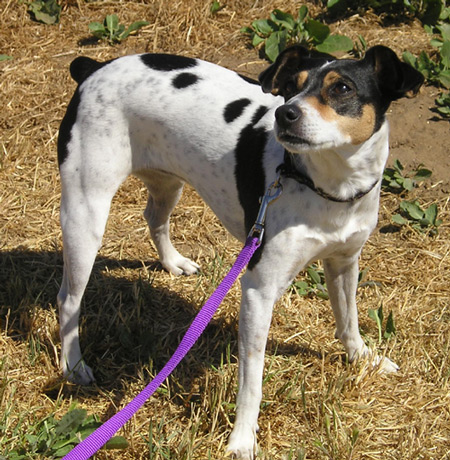
A clip-on leash attached to a Jack Russell Terrier's collar

A leash, also known as a lead, lead line, or tether is a rope or similar material used to control an animal by attaching it to a collar, harness, or halter. In British English, a leash is typically used for larger animals that may be dangerous or aggressive, while a lead is more commonly used when walking a dog.

== Types of leashes ==
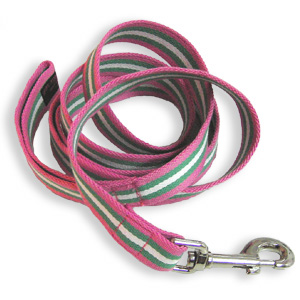
Nylon webbing leash, a common style

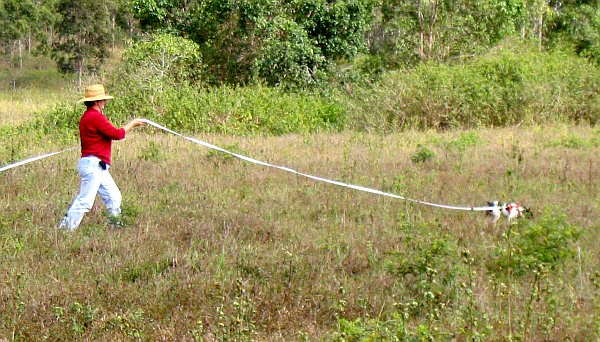
Tenterfield Terrier on a long leash at a tracking trial

Leashes take many forms; for example:

- A simple metal chain.
- Very short tab leashes; a clip attached to a loop handle or to a short piece of leather with a knot or similar short handle. Allows very close, tight control of a dog in certain competition or training situations.
- Short, soft, braided leather leash with a loop handle and a clip to attach to the collar, usually about 4 feet in length, commonly used during obedience training. The softness enables the trainer to fold the leash into a shorter length and the braiding allows a firmer grip.
- Nylon webbing leash, also known as a tracking/training leash in the UK, usually 4 to 6 feet, with a loop handle and clip, most commonly used for walking dogs casually.
- Extended-length webbing leashes, 12 to 30 feet or more, also known as a tracking/training leash in the UK, usually with a loop handle and a clip, primarily for training at a distance or during tracking sessions.
- Slip-leash, usually with a loop handle and an adjustable, slipping loop at the other end that goes around the dog's neck. Often used in work or competitions—such as dog agility—where the leash must be quickly removed and replaced.
- Retractable, a hook on a thin rope that retracts automatically into a large plastic handle, allowing the dog to wander 15 or 25 feet away while keeping the leash taut (in theory preventing it from tangling around obstacles or the dog's legs) but still allowing the handler to reel in the dog for closer control.

There are also bicycle dog leashes, especially designed for people who enjoy taking their pet on a ride with the bike. The leash is an aluminum tube with a plastic coated cable which runs down through the tube. It extends out of the tube end a couple of feet to allow for ease of movement for the dog. One end connects to the bike and the other to the dog's collar. This keeps them safely away from the bike. While bicycle leashes might be suitable for some dogs, they aren't a good idea for all breeds. There are numerous safety considerations before attempting to bike with a dog.

Cat leashes and harnesses are also available on the market and are convenient for people who are not comfortable or don't want to face the possible tragic consequences of letting their pet free.

== Leash laws in the United States ==
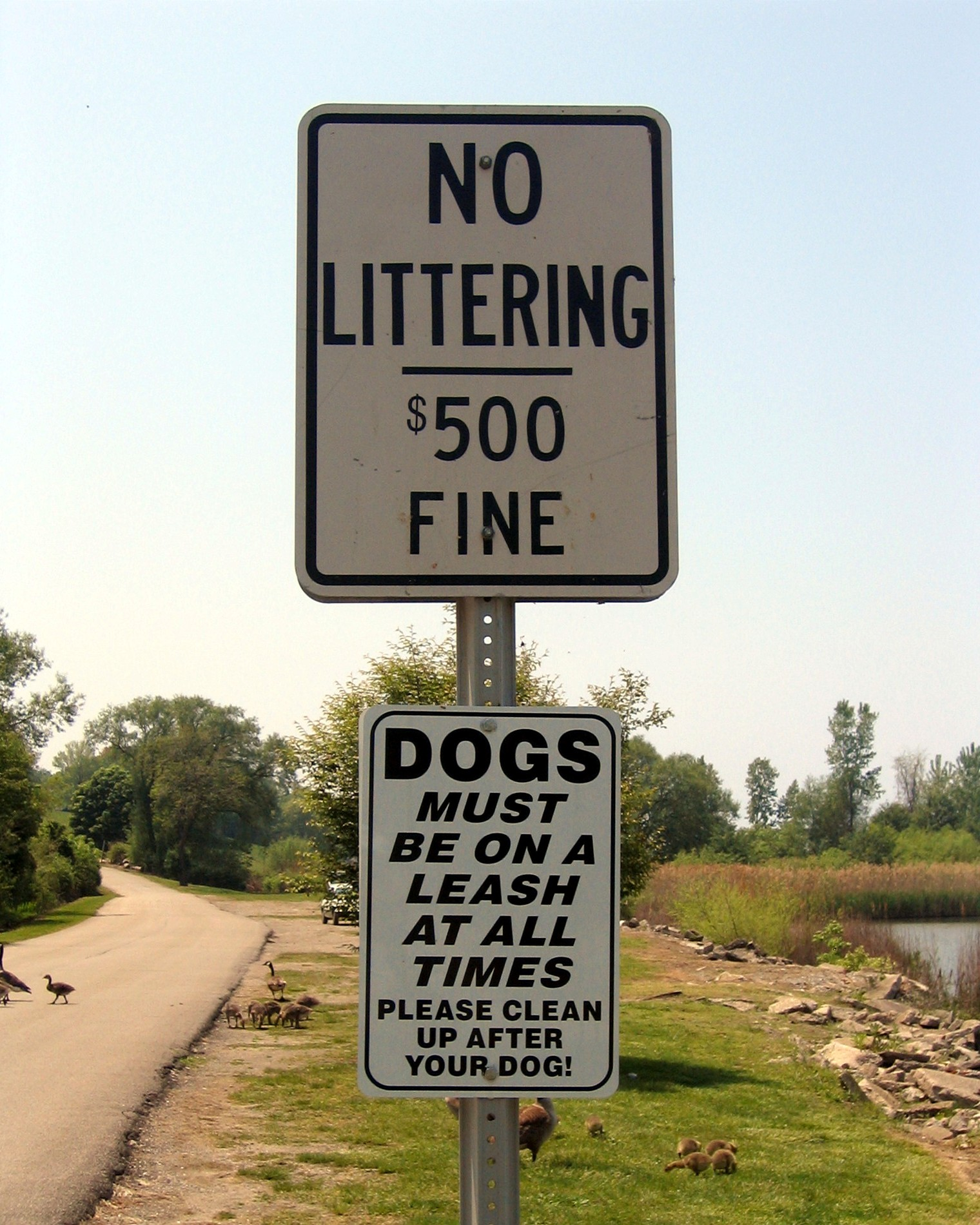
Sign near Conneaut Harbor (in Conneaut, Ohio)

Many cities have passed legislation that requires dogs to be on leash in public areas; in some areas, cats are also required to be restrained (under control) on a leash, in a kennel, or in a cat-proof yard or house.

Purposes of a leash include: preventing animals from frightening or biting people or other animals, defecating and urinating in inappropriate places, endangering traffic, digging up lawns, causing other damage, getting lost, and getting away from owners. Leashes also provide a clear method of communication and ensure control during training of dogs and other animals like cats and some parrots.

Leashes are often used for enrichment as well - for a considerable amount of domestic mammals and a few reptiles, leash walking provides the freedom, enrichment, and physical exercise without the car risks of night free roaming neither the risk of animals like cats and ferrets hunting local bird populations.

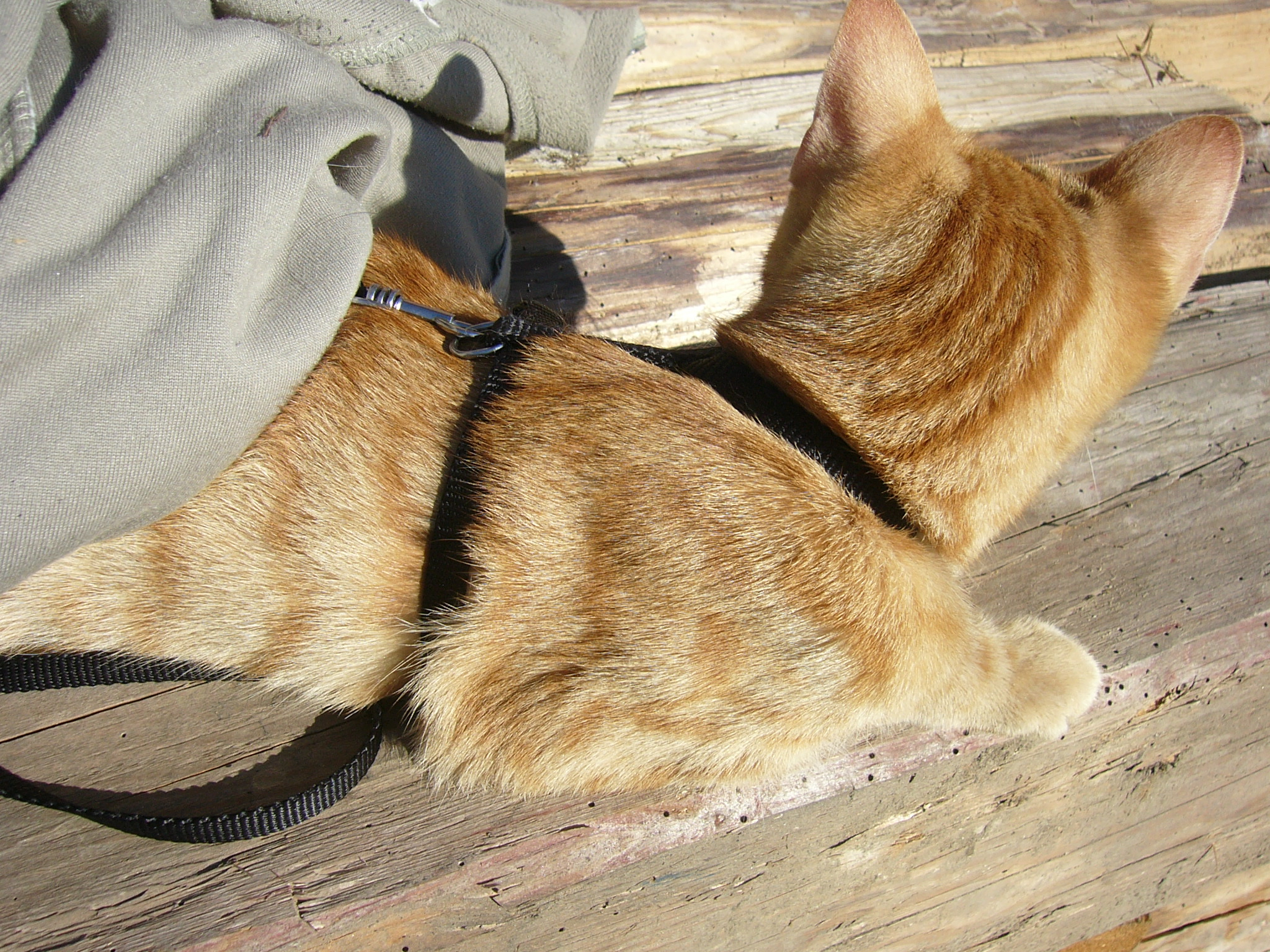
Cat wearing a harness and leash

In the United States, leash laws are different within each state. While some states do not have statewide leash laws and give localities power to make leash law, there are some other states in which leash laws apply statewide.

States that do not have statewide leash laws are Alabama, Alaska, Arizona, Arkansas, California, Colorado, Florida, Georgia, Hawaii, Idaho, Iowa, Kansas, Maryland, Massachusetts, Minnesota, Mississippi, Montana, Nevada, New Jersey, New Mexico, North Dakota, Oklahoma, Oregon, Rhode Island, South Carolina, South Dakota, Texas, Utah, Vermont, Virginia, Washington, and Wyoming.

=== Connecticut ===
In Connecticut, dogs are not permitted to run at large except in the situation of hunting. Still, if the dog has vicious propensities and the owner still allows it to run at large and a person is bitten, the owner can be fined for up to $1,000 and is also liable for 6 months of prison unless the victim has abused the dog and provoked the harmful behavior.

=== Delaware ===
In Delaware, dogs are not allowed to run at large unless in situations when the owner is present and has control over the pet. An exception is for farm dogs. Also, during the night dogs must be kept in an enclosure from which they cannot escape, firmly secured with a collar or chain or other device, so they cannot stray from the premises, or are under the reasonable control of the owner or custodian. If an owner does not respect these laws and if the dog bites someone, the owner is subject to civil liability and for fines of up to $1,500.

=== District of Columbia (DC) ===
Dogs in the District of Columbia must be kept on a leash as well. They are also not permitted on school grounds when school is in session or on any public recreation area without a leash.

=== Indiana ===
Indiana is one of the states that has a restraint statute, which means that dogs must be restrained at all times. Otherwise, if the dog bites a person when not restrained the owner is subject to civil liability and criminal penalties.

=== Kentucky ===
Dogs are allowed to run at large during the night in Kentucky only if they are accompanied by and under control of their owner.

=== Louisiana and Maine ===
According to the leash laws of Louisiana, dogs are prohibited to run at large at all times of the day. The same law applies in Maine, where the only exception is for hunting dogs.

=== Missouri ===
Missouri legislation requires that dogs are kept in leashes that are no longer than 10 feet when they are in state parks or on historic sites. Also, dogs that have rabies are not permitted to run at large.

=== Nebraska ===
In Nebraska, dogs may run at large only in counties where the population does not reach 80,000.

=== New Hampshire ===
New Hampshire legislation does not allow dogs to run at large unless they are accompanied by their owner or custodian or when dogs are used for training or are trained for hunting, herding or exhibitions.

=== Illinois ===
Illinois legislation prohibits owners from walking their dogs when they are not in a leash.

=== New York ===
Dogs in New York must be restrained or confined at all times of the day. However, certain NYC parks allow dogs off leash at certain hours.

=== North Carolina ===
According to the North Carolina law, dogs are allowed to run at large during the night only if they are accompanied by their owner or a person who has received the owner's permission to do so.

=== Ohio ===
Ohio law requires one to "keep the dog under the reasonable control of some person," but does not require a leash except for "any female dog … at any time the dog is in heat." There are additional provisions for "dangerous dogs" that have injured a person or killed another dog.

=== Oregon ===
Some Oregon counties and cities have leash ordinances that can be used to hold dog owners responsible for injuries resulting from their animal attacking or biting a person while running at large. These ordinances expand upon Oregon law, under which dog owners have limited responsibility for injuries caused by their dogs unless the owner was aware that the animal is abnormally dangerous.

=== Pennsylvania ===
Pennsylvania legislation states that dogs must be confined or firmly secured or reasonably controlled by a person, within the property of the owner.

=== Tennessee ===
Tennessee law prohibits dogs to run at large except in cases in which dogs are engaged in legal hunting or herding.

=== West Virginia and Wisconsin ===
West Virginia and Wisconsin are states that do not have a law that requires dogs to be leashed. Still, they do have laws that hold dog owners and keepers liable for all damages caused by dogs that are permitted to run at large.

Different law applies to dangerous dogs and female dogs as in different states they are prohibited to run at large at all times. Also, in states such as Connecticut and Louisiana, guide dogs must also be leashed.

== Dog leashes ==
Dog leashes are used to walk the dog in public places. Having the dog wear a leash is a way of protecting the dog and other persons (e.g., if the dog runs away and bites someone). The length is one of the important aspects of the leash. The length of the leash must be chosen according to the size of the dog and it is important because it allows a good control. Leashes should not be either too long or too short. Too-long leashes do not provide good control of the pet whereas too-short leashes are uncomfortable for both the dog and the owner. The perfect leash can restrain the dog but at the same time is not viewed as a punishment for the pet.

High quality dog leashes have a good quality metal clip and they can be made of leather, nylon or even chain. The metal clip must securely fasten to a metal ring on the collar in order to maintain good control of the dog. The material of which the leash is made of is not of great importance as long as the leash does not show evidence of wear or fraying. Therefore, leashes should be periodically checked to ensure they are maintained in proper condition.

An important aspect of dog leashes is their sturdiness. Although rope leashes are quite cheap, they are vulnerable to chewing and fraying and are not amongst the most recommended types of leashes. Nylon leashes are recommended; this material provides a bit of elasticity which is meant to result in more comfort for the dog. On the other hand, nylon leashes can cause chafe or can cut into the skin of the dog.

Leather leashes are often preferred over the nylon ones because of the resistance of the material and because it becomes more flexible with age and it is softer. Leather is however more prone to be chewed when compared to nylon.

The retractable dog leash is one of the most dangerous leashes for the dogs because they allow them to go as far as they want. Retractable leashes are usually made of nylon and the retractable device is made of plastic or a stronger composite. Although these leashes can be convenient for both the dog and the owner as it allows some control, they make it difficult to keep a dog under control which can result in persons or other dogs being attacked. Aggressive dogs should not be walked with such a leash, and puppies should be kept closely to ensure their protection from various dangers such as cars. Dogs with a tendency to bolt without warning should be walked with caution, as a retractable lead can allow the dog to accelerate to significant speed before being stopped, presenting the possibility of injury to both dog and owner.

Some leashes are made of reflective materials and are suitable for walking the dog at night. They are convenient because they make the dog and the owner much more visible in the traffic, reducing the likelihood of accidents.

== Cat leashes ==
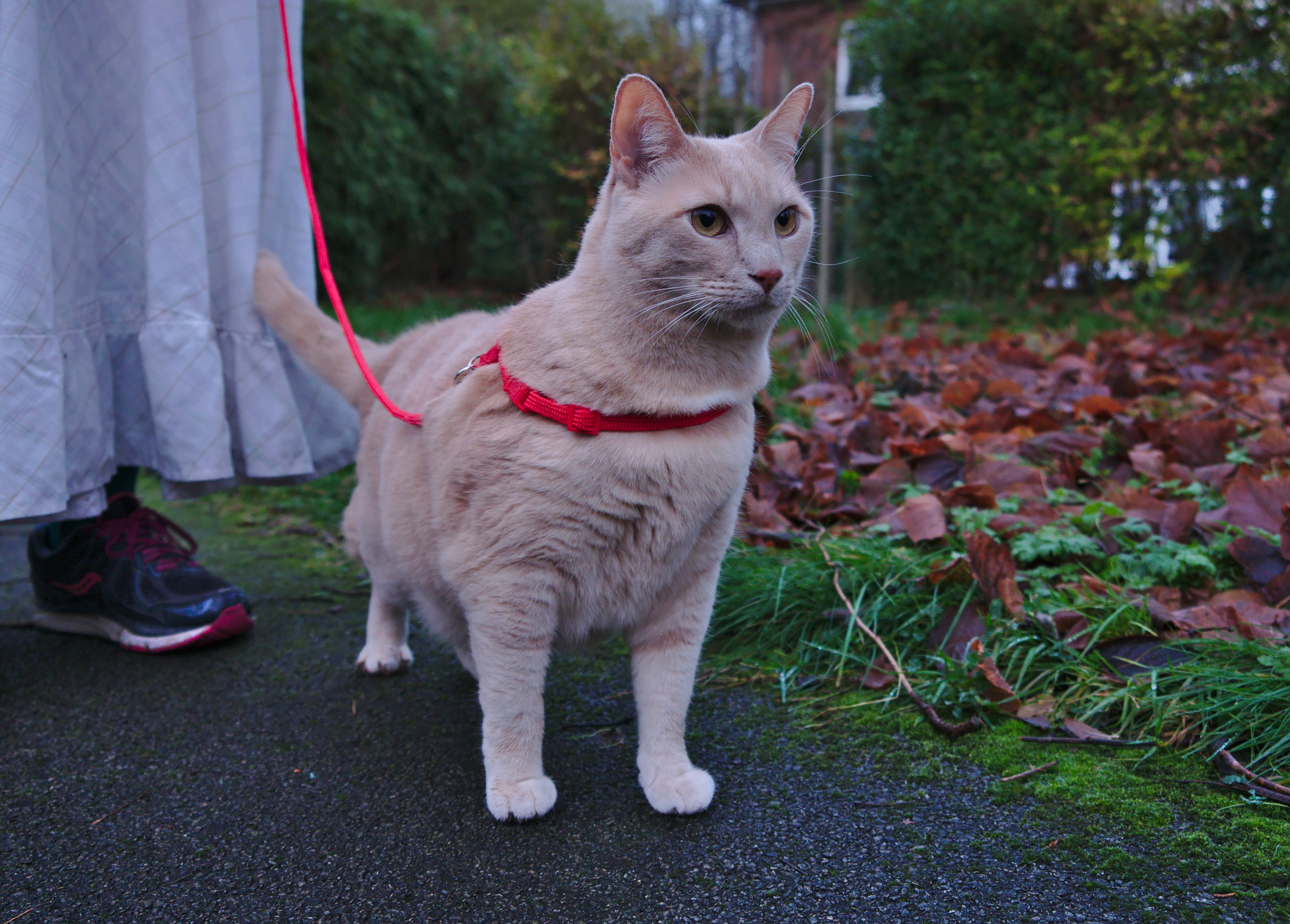
Cat wearing a harness on a walk

Cat leashes are used with the purpose of preventing the cat getting lost. Unlike dogs, cats rarely attack persons on the street, so cat leashes are mainly a safety measure to protect the pet itself. Very often the collars are replaced with harnesses, or the collars are used strictly as an accessory because harnesses avoid the dangers of collars which include escaping and running away or choking. Cats are more likely to take a bit more time to walk comfortably because of their more sensitive hearing and nature, however it can be accomplished. Some cats learn from dogs, other cats, and humans on how to be more confident which can help with leash training. Pet experts recommend a backup carrier, such as if you are walking a cat and another species such as a dog and the cat gets tired, or if the cat gets spooked by a noise and you cannot handle it safely.

Cat leashes come in a variety of colors, designs and models and are made of different materials. There are cat leashes made of leather, nylon and rope.

== Leashes for large animals ==
Leashes are used on large animals—such as bovids, camelids, and equids—to lead them so that they will be forced to follow and come to a desired area—as well as to tether them to a specific area, such as to a fencepost or tree trunk, so that they will remain stationary and not run away. Oftentimes, leashes are used to tether such animals when they require separation, examination, or work to be done to them, such as grooming and tacking up.

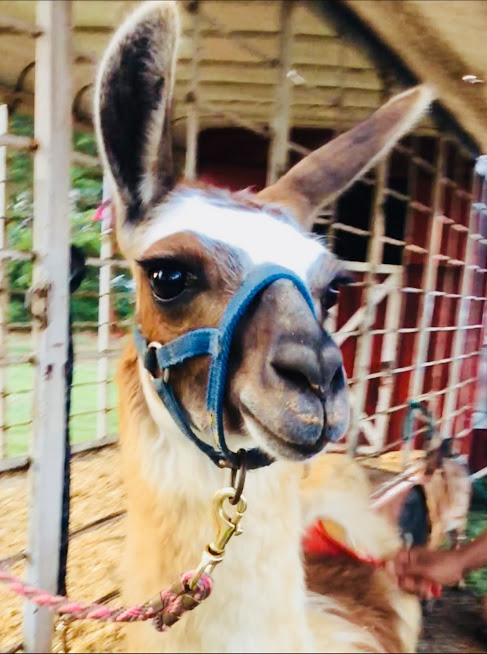
A llama at a petting zoo wearing a halter with a leash tied to a metal bar attached to it

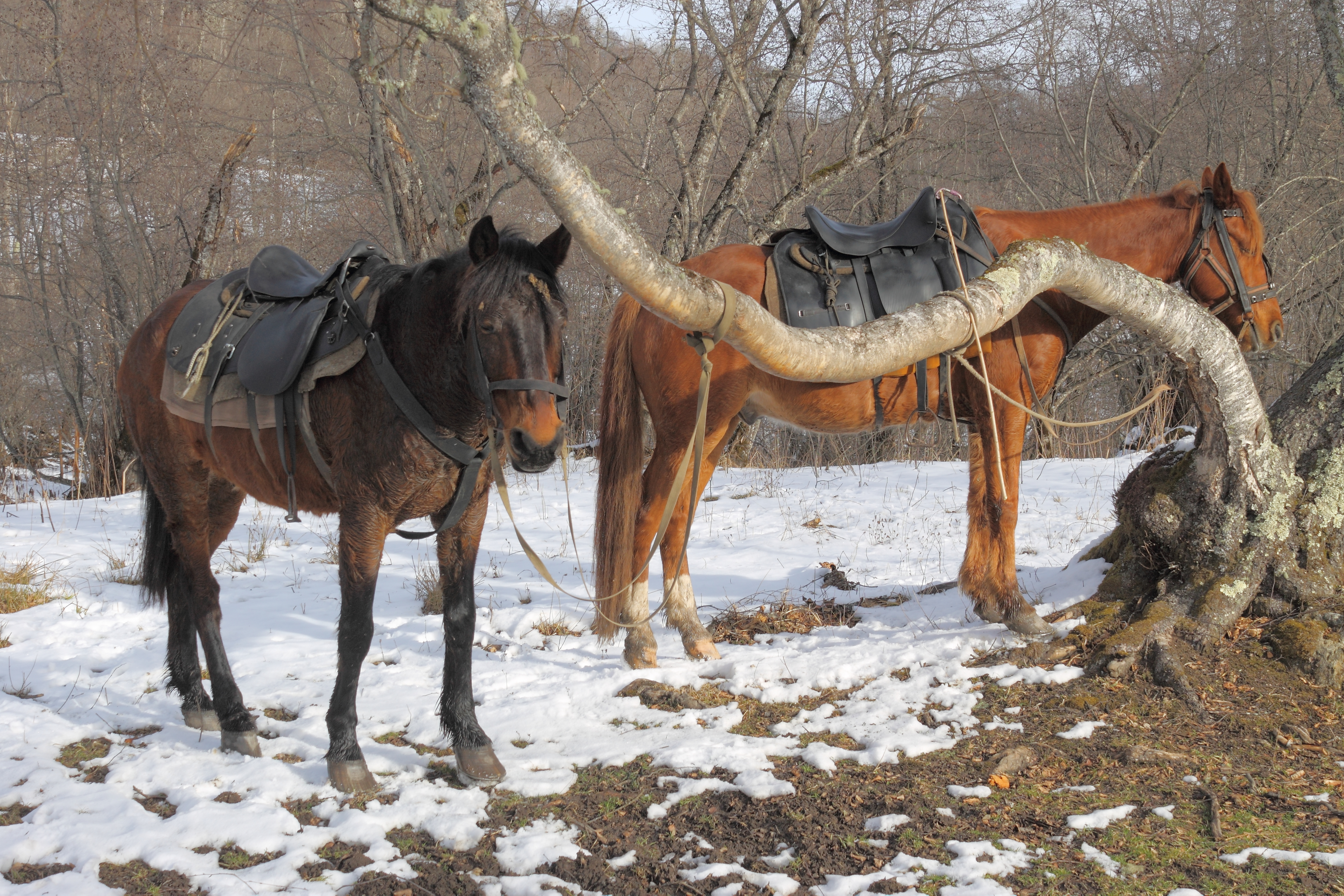
Horses with halters attached to leashes tethered to a tree trunk

== Notes ==
- Dog leashes date back a very long time, both in art and written record, as a Proto-cuneiform tablet, Jemdet Nasr period, c. 3100–2900 BC features a "figure guiding two dogs on a leash and hunting or herding boars in a reed marsh".
- Among hunters, a collection of three hares ("a brace and a half" or tierce) or three creatures of any kind, especially greyhounds, foxes, and deer, is called "a leash".
- Child leashes, attached to child harnesses, ensure that young children do not wander far away from their guardians. The metal clip is attached to the harness that the child wears, while the other end containing the loop is held by the guardian.

== See also ==
- Child harness
- Coiling
- Creance
- Fiador (tack)
