= Tierce =

Tierce comes from the Latin word for third and may refer to:

- Tiercé, a commune in France
- Tierce (fencing), a fencing manoeuvre
- Tierce (unit), both an archaic volume unit of measure of goods and the name of the cask of that size
- Tierce, an organ stop, also known as a seventeenth
- Tierce, an archaic term for one-sixtieth of a second, equal to 1/216,000 of an hour, 16.6̅ milliseconds
- Tierce, a horse racing bet type also known as a trifecta
- Tierced in heraldry, the dividing of the field into three sections, per pale or per fess

== See also ==
- Terce, the third liturgical hour
