= Cap =

Headgear

A cap is a flat headgear. They made their first appearance as early as 3200 BC. The origin of the word "cap" comes from the Old French word "chapeau" which means "head covering". Over time, the word has evolved and changed its meaning, but it still retains its association with headwear. They are popular in casual and informal settings, and are seen in sports and fashion. They are typically designed for warmth, and often incorporate a visor to block sunlight from the eyes. They come in many shapes, sizes, colors and are of different brands. Baseball caps are one of the most common types of cap.

== Types ==
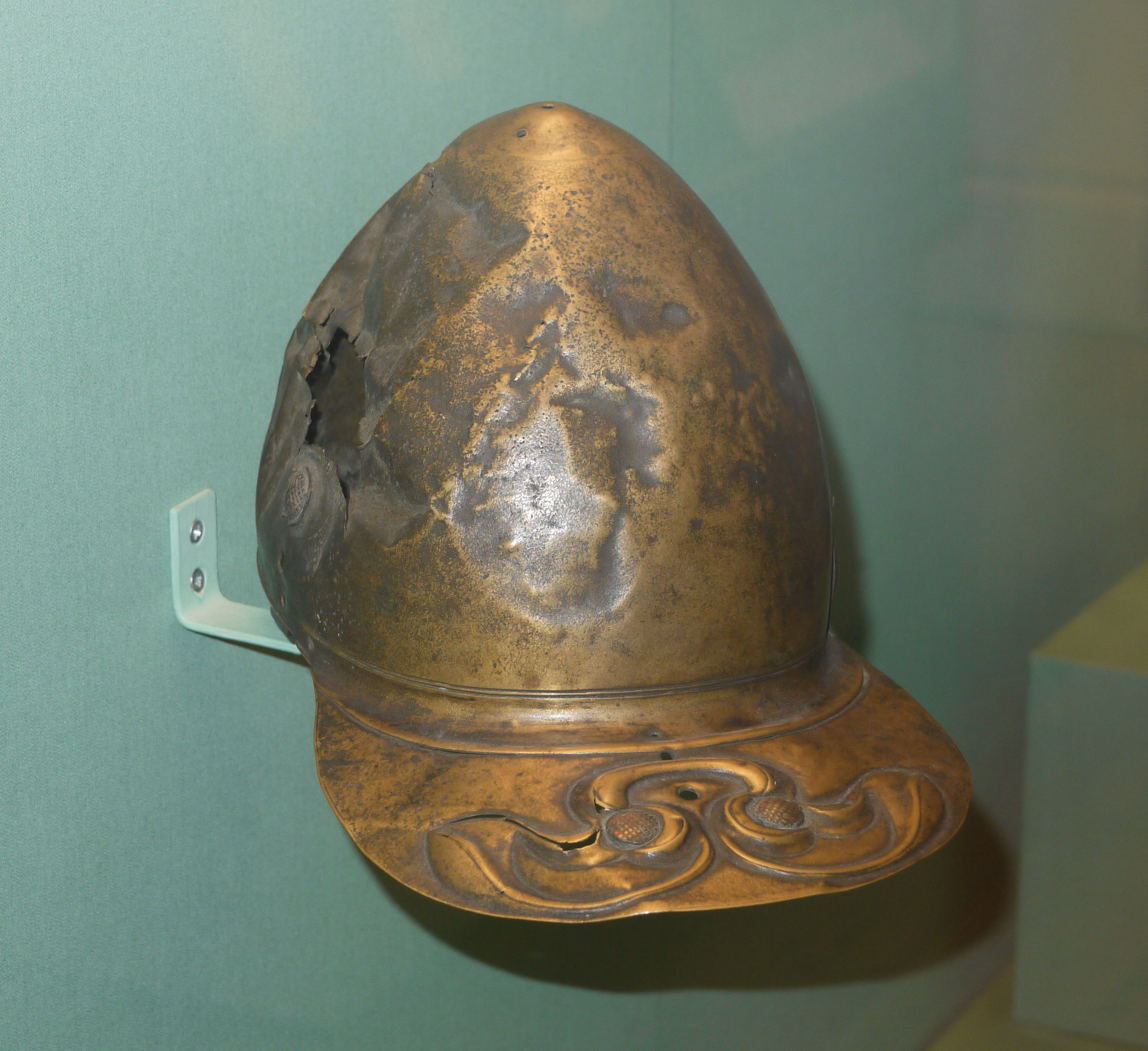
The Meyrick Helmet is a Celtic: Brythonic helmet that is likely to have originated from Northern England in the 1st century AD. The flat plane extending from the rim is intended to protect the back of the neck; however, some theorise it may have been turned in reverse to shield the eyes from sunlight whilst in battle

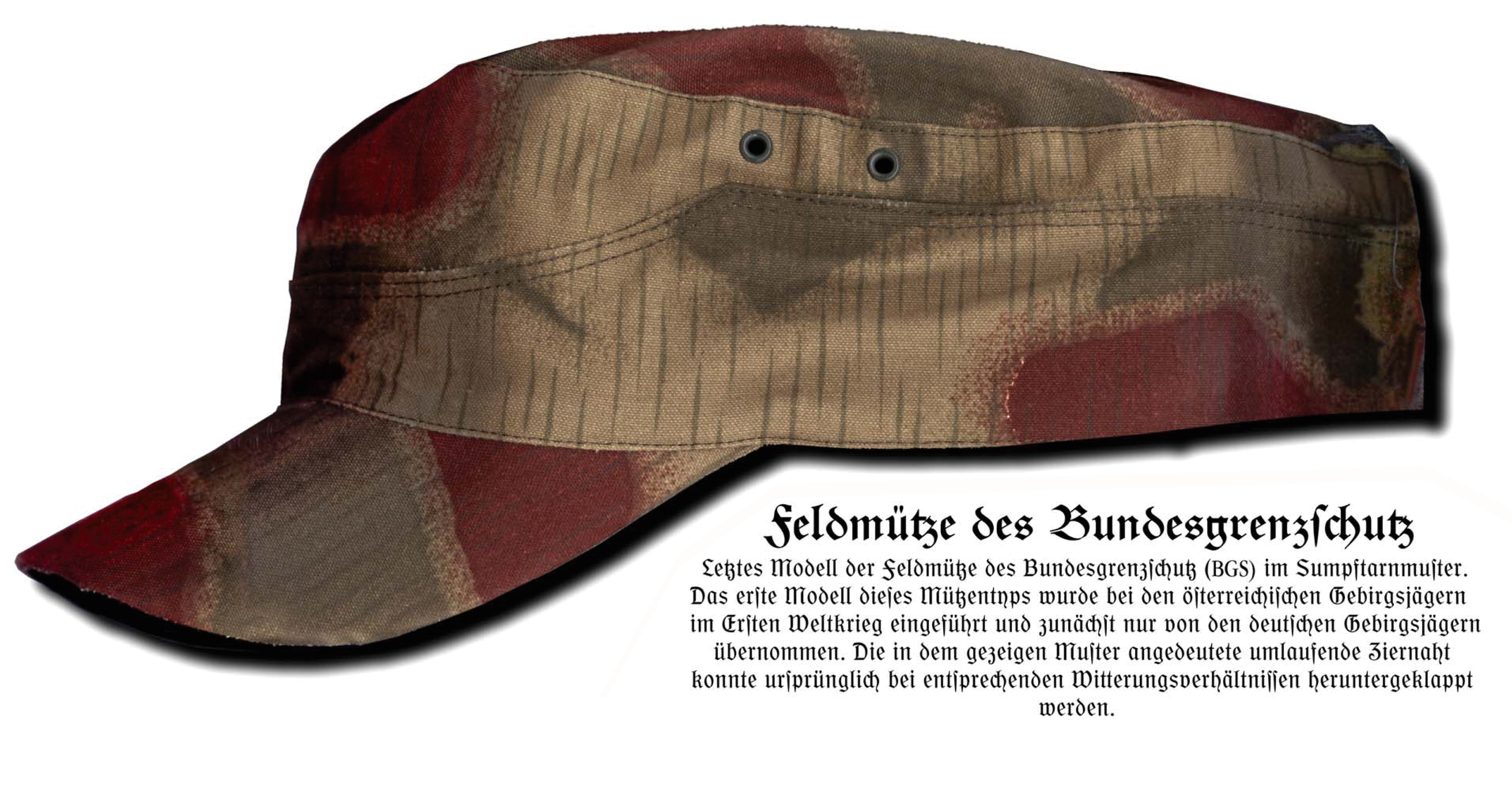
German M43-style field cap of the "Bundesgrenzschutz" (BGS) (now called Bundespolizei), the German Federal Police

- Ascot cap
- Ayam
- Baggy green
- Balmoral
- Beanie (North America)
- Bearskin
- Beret
- Biretta
- Busby
- Canterbury cap
- Cap and bells
- Cap of maintenance
- Casquette
- Caubeen
- Caul
- Coif
- Combination cap (also known as a service cap)
- Coppola
- Cricket cap
- Deerstalker
- Do-rag
- Dutch cap
- Dixie cup, an enlisted sailor's cap, also worn by first-year midshipmen at Annapolis
- Fez
- Flat cap (also known as a Kerry cap in Ireland (slang of Paddy cap—see also Caubeen), longshoreman's cap, scally cap, Wigens cap, ivy cap, golf cap, duffer cap, driving cap, bicycle cap, Jeff cap, or in Scotland, bunnet, or in Wales, Dai cap, or in England or New Zealand, cheese-cutter)
- Forage cap
- Gandhi cap
- Garrison cap
- Glengarry
- Greek fisherman's cap (also known as a Breton cap or a fiddler's cap)
- Juliet cap
- Kalpak, a traditional Turkic cap
- Karakul
- Kepi
- Kippah (also known as yarmulke or skull cap)—worn by Jewish males
- Knit cap (also known as a Tuque, stocking cap, wool cap, watch cap, ski cap, bobble hat)
- Kufi (also known as a kofia; an African cap worn with a dashiki)
- Lika cap
- M43 field cap, commonly used during World War II
- Guapi mao
- Meyrick Helmet, a bronze Iron Age helmet originated in Britain, featuring a Roman-style shape with a peaked neck guard.
- Miter
- Monmouth cap, worn by most soldiers between the 15th & 18th centuries.
- Newsboy cap
- Nightcap
- Nurse cap
- Ochipok
- Pakol
- Papakhi
- Patrol cap
- Peaked cap
- Phrygian cap, generally symbolizes liberty, freedom, and revolution.
- Propeller cap, represented aspiration, the desire to fly, and resembled the science fiction fandom.
- Rastacap
- Sailor cap
- Shako
- Shower cap
- Sindhi cap
- Sports visor
- Square academic cap
- Stormy Kromer cap
- Swim cap
- Tam o' Shanter
- Taqiyah, worn by Muslim males
- Toque
- Tubeteika
- Turban
- Ushanka
- Utility cover
- Zucchetto
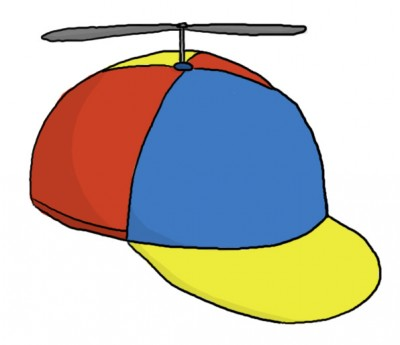
A propeller hat, also known as a propeller beanie

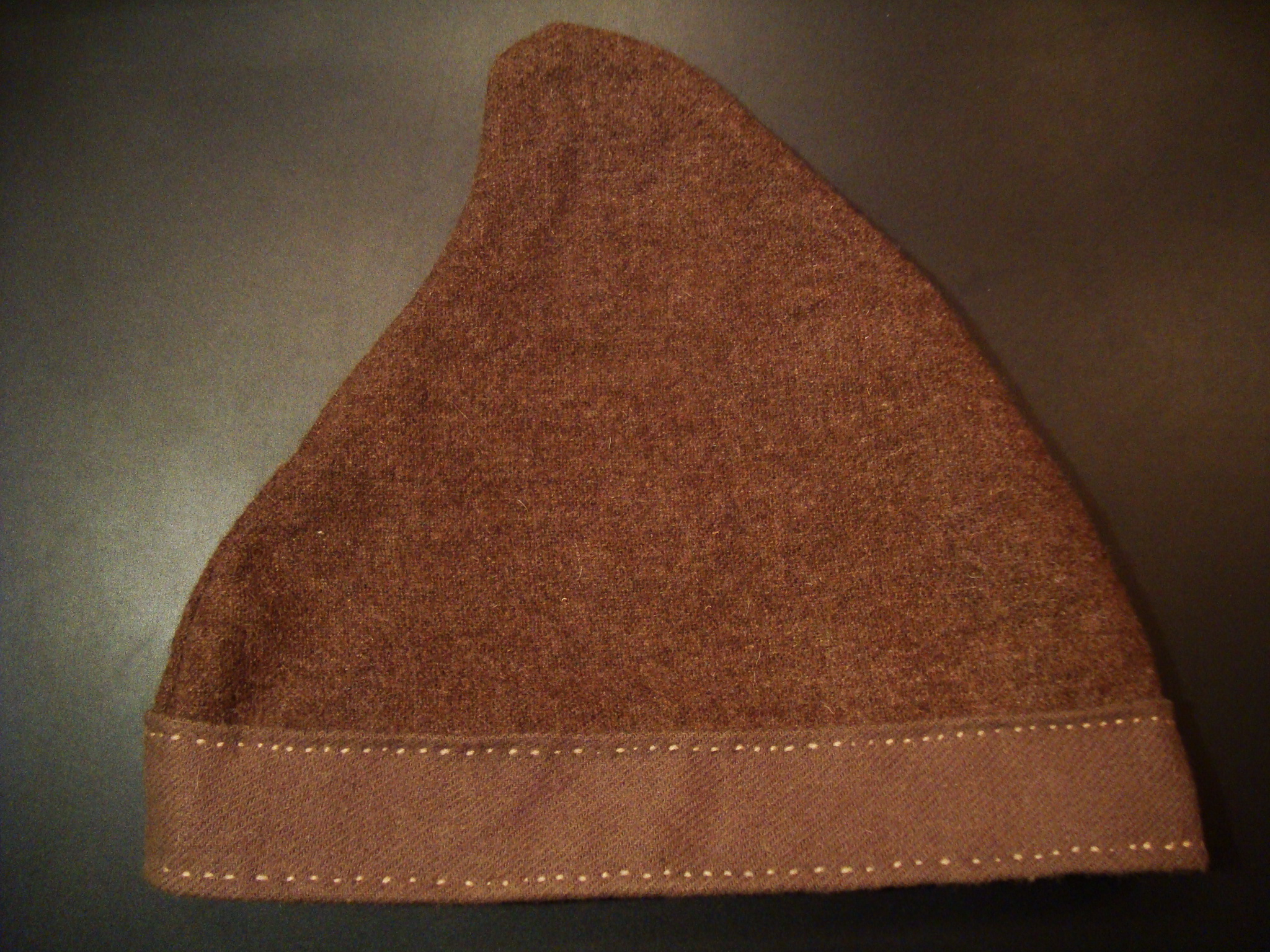
Phrygian cap as fashion

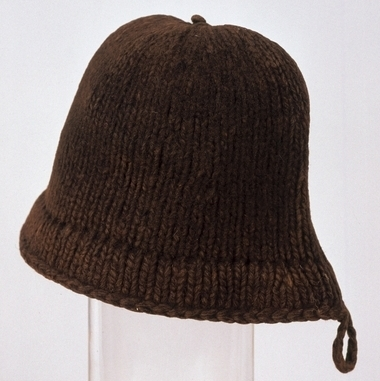
The only known example of an original Monmouth cap, dating from the 16th century

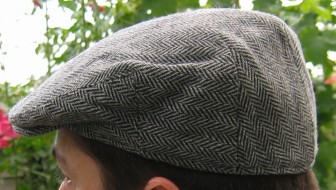
Flat cap

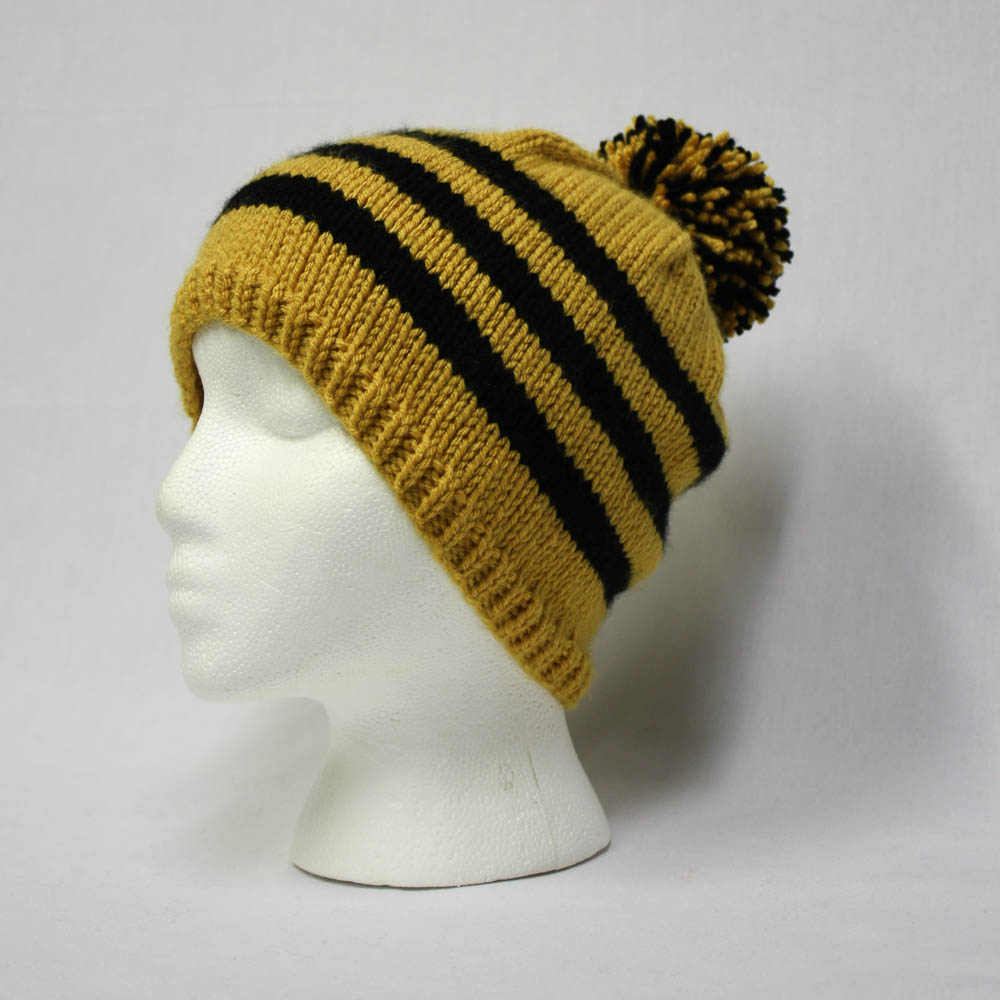
A type of knit cap sometimes called bobblehat, toque, or stocking cap

=== Baseball caps ===
- Baseball cap
- Fitted cap
- Snapback
- Trucker hat
Baseball cap styles and variations

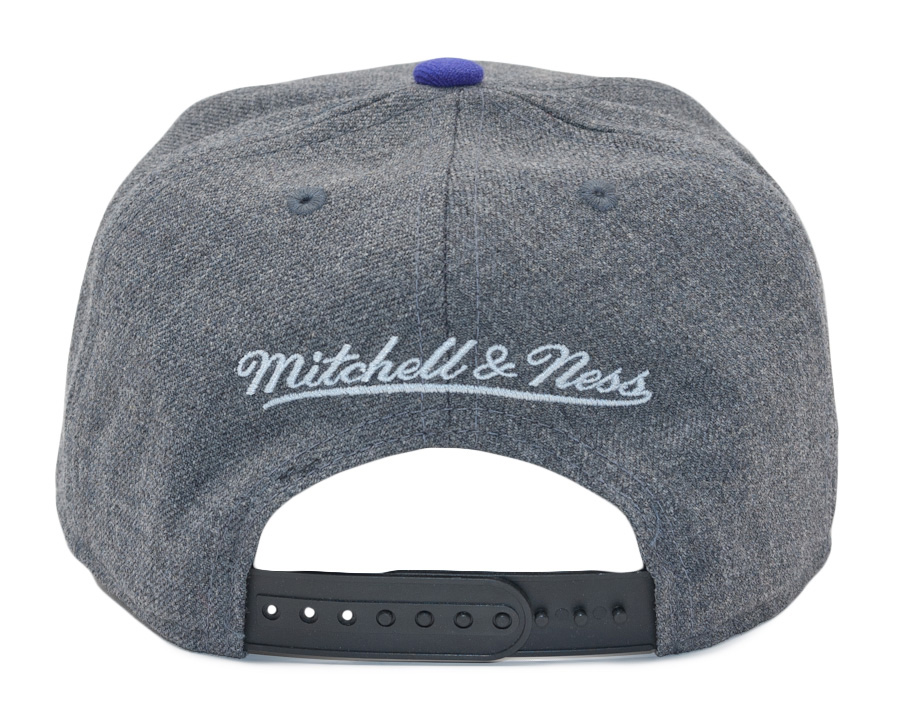
Snapback baseball cap

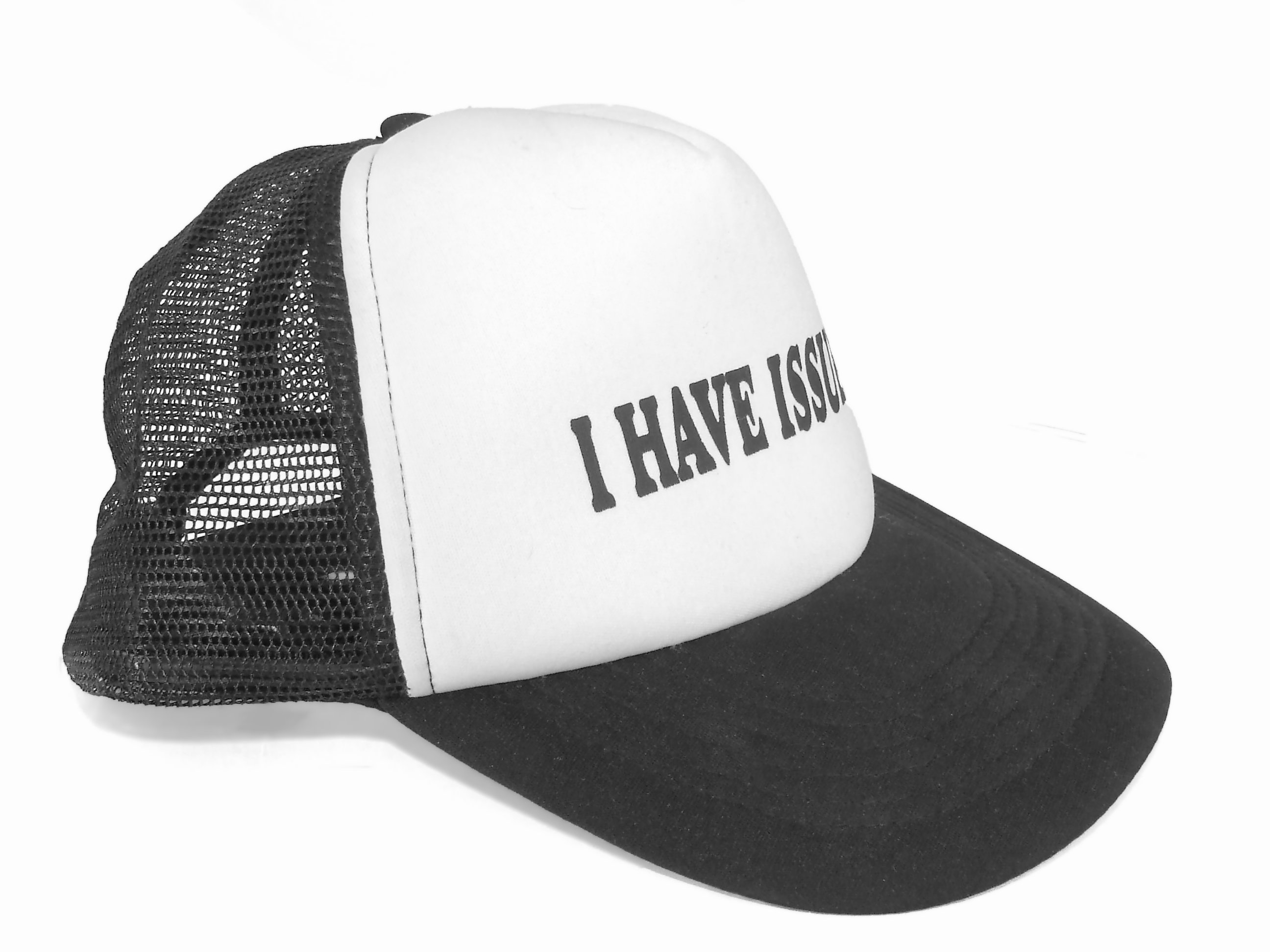
Trucker cap

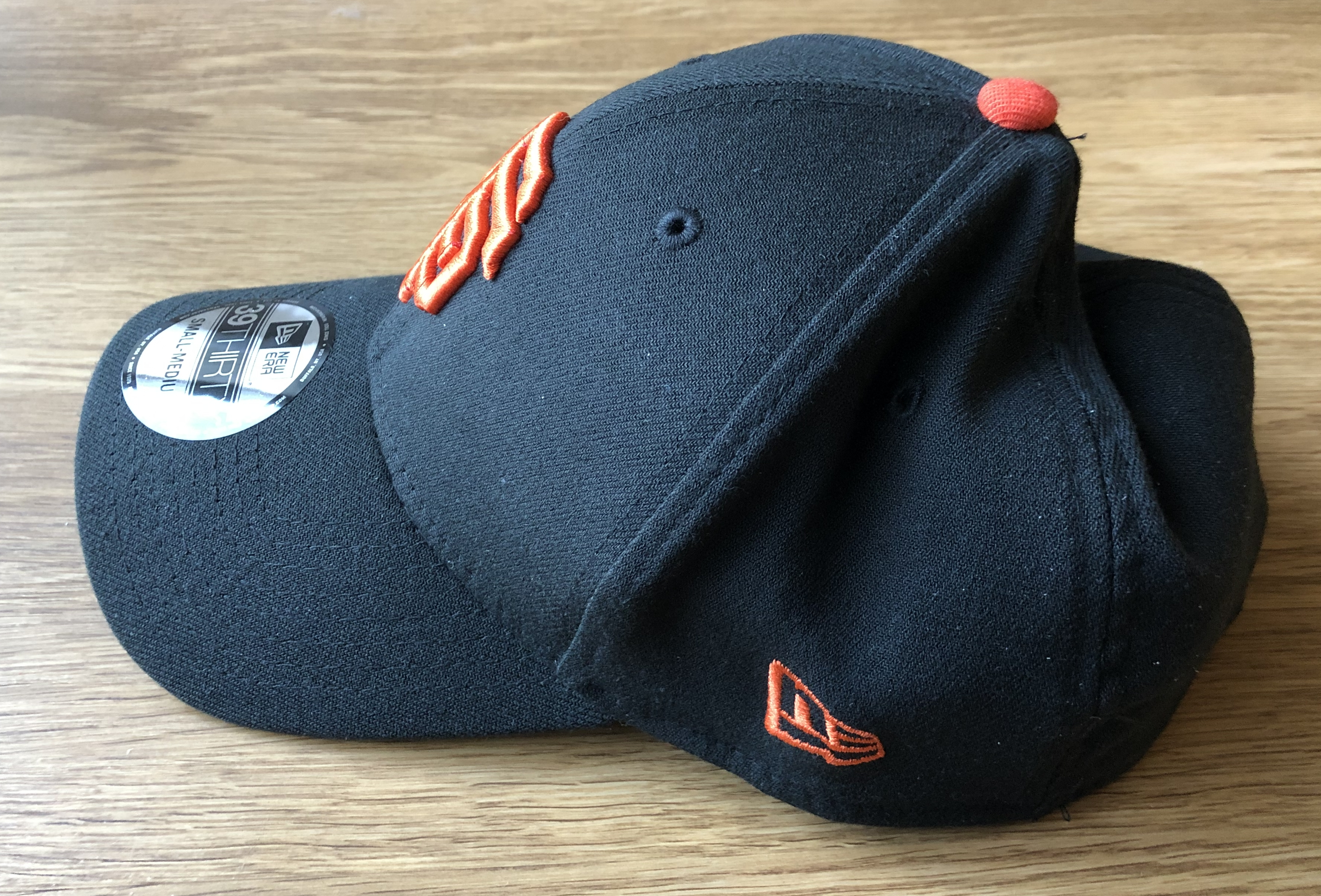
Flexfit-style baseball cap

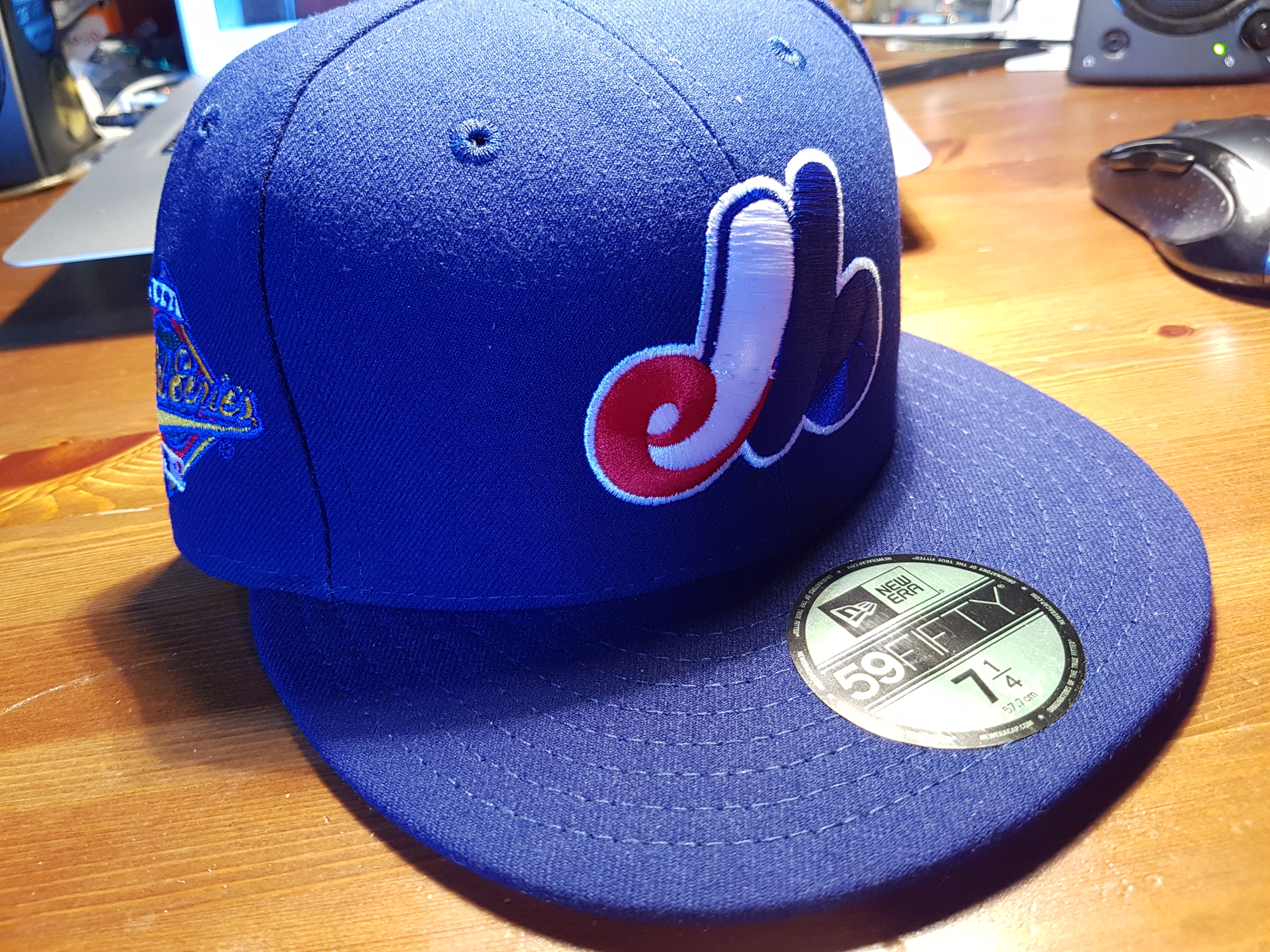
Fitted baseball cap

== Present day depictions of caps ==
=== Sports ===
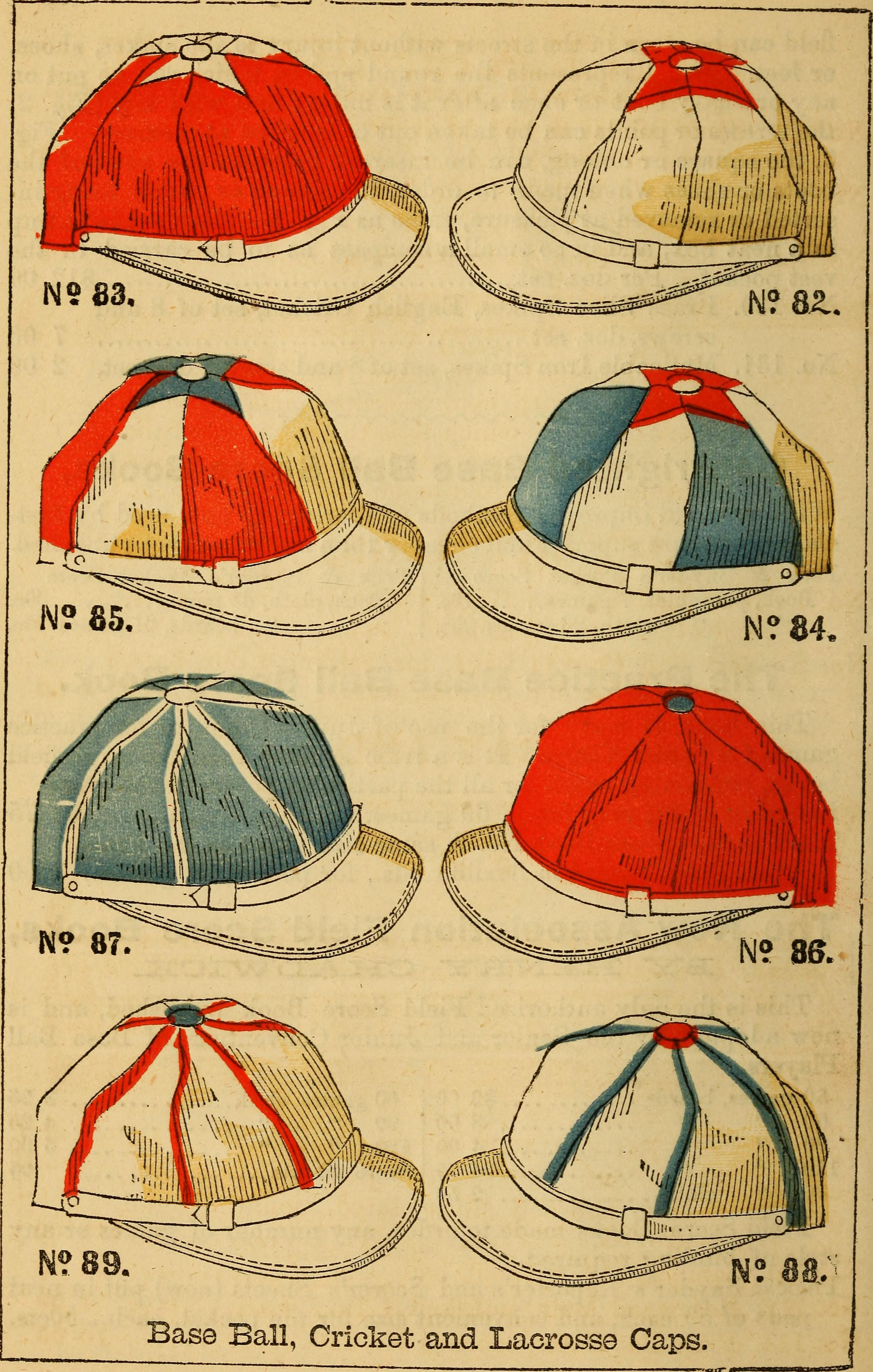
Historic caps of different sports

As stated earlier, caps are typically designed with a visor which makes it perfect for keeping a person cool from the heat and sheltering a person's eyes from the sun, so it was a matter of time before they made it to the sports industry. The first sport to adopt wearing caps was baseball, the hats were made out of straw and were worn on April 24, 1849, by the New York Knickerbockers. However, within a few years time the team began to wear a cap made of fine merino wool, that featured a crown and an attached visor. This design became the prototype for caps of that time and still the most popular in present day. It's also not the only design for baseball hats but other sports as well, such as cricket, golf and tennis.

=== Fashion ===
Sportswear found its way to fashion in the nineteenth century and on the contrary to what many believe it began to actually cater to the wants and needs of women. Sports cap however made an impact on the fashion industry around the 1980s when the company New Era, who had been designing hats for sports teams, began designing and selling hats to the general public. Baseball caps, fitted caps, snapback caps and truckers hats would then be seen in music videos, films, runways and even on Princess Diana's head, which helped nurture her appearance as the "people's princess." Along with hats, sports jerseys also became available in the 1980s as well, and now licensed apparel is a multi-billion dollar industry.

=== Etiquette ===
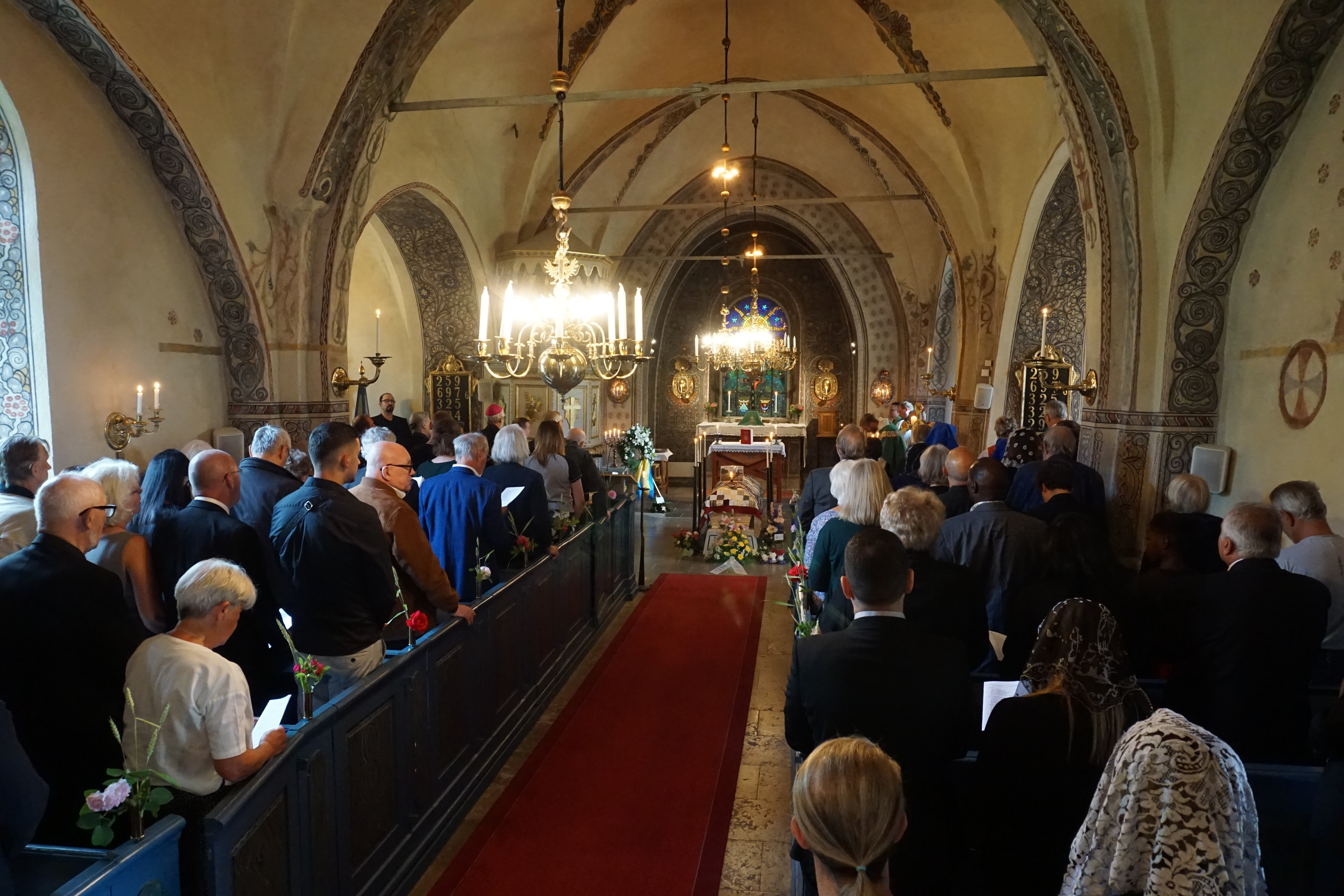
While men have removed their caps, a number of Evangelical-Lutheran Christian women have veiled themselves for the celebration of the Mass at Alsike Church, Sweden (2023)

In Western societies, it has been traditional for men to remove their caps when entering a Christian church—a practice derived from 1 Corinthians 11 in the Bible. On the other hand, women historically were required to wear a headcovering when entering a Christian church (a practice that decreased in the West in the 1960s, though it still occurs in the East). (Note: In the West, certain denominations of Christianity preserved the practice of the headcovering of women during, chiefly Conservative Anabaptist fellowships and Old Order Anabaptist groups, as well as by certain Eastern Orthodox and Oriental Orthodox congregations. In the 21st century, the wearing of a headcovering by women during Mass and while praying at home has increased in the West, especially among Roman Catholics and Evangelical-Lutherans.) Historically, men in Western Christian societies removed their cap when entering a room where women were present, as well as when a national flag is paraded. Men traditionally remove their cap when a funeral passes through an area in which they are present. Until World War I, it was customary for women to wear a white cap on her head, and women were rarely seen in public without one.

== Meaning in slang ==
In modern slang, cap may refer to something that is false or untrue, while no cap refers to the opposite, something that is truthful.

== Gallery ==
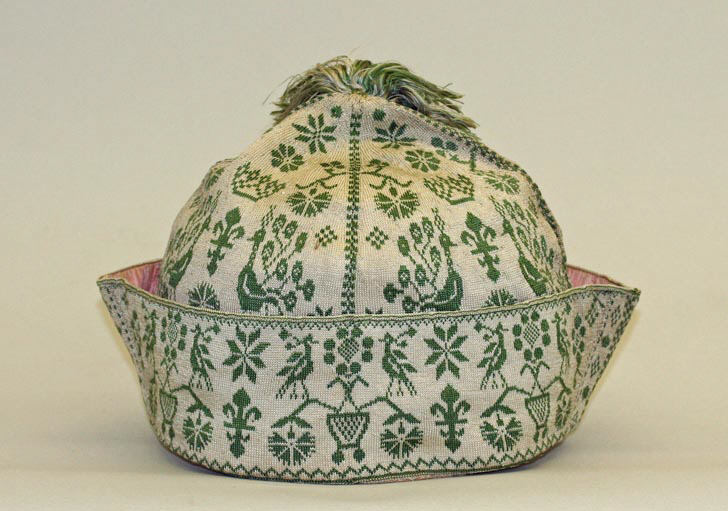
Italian cap, c. 17th century. Metropolitan Museum of Art.

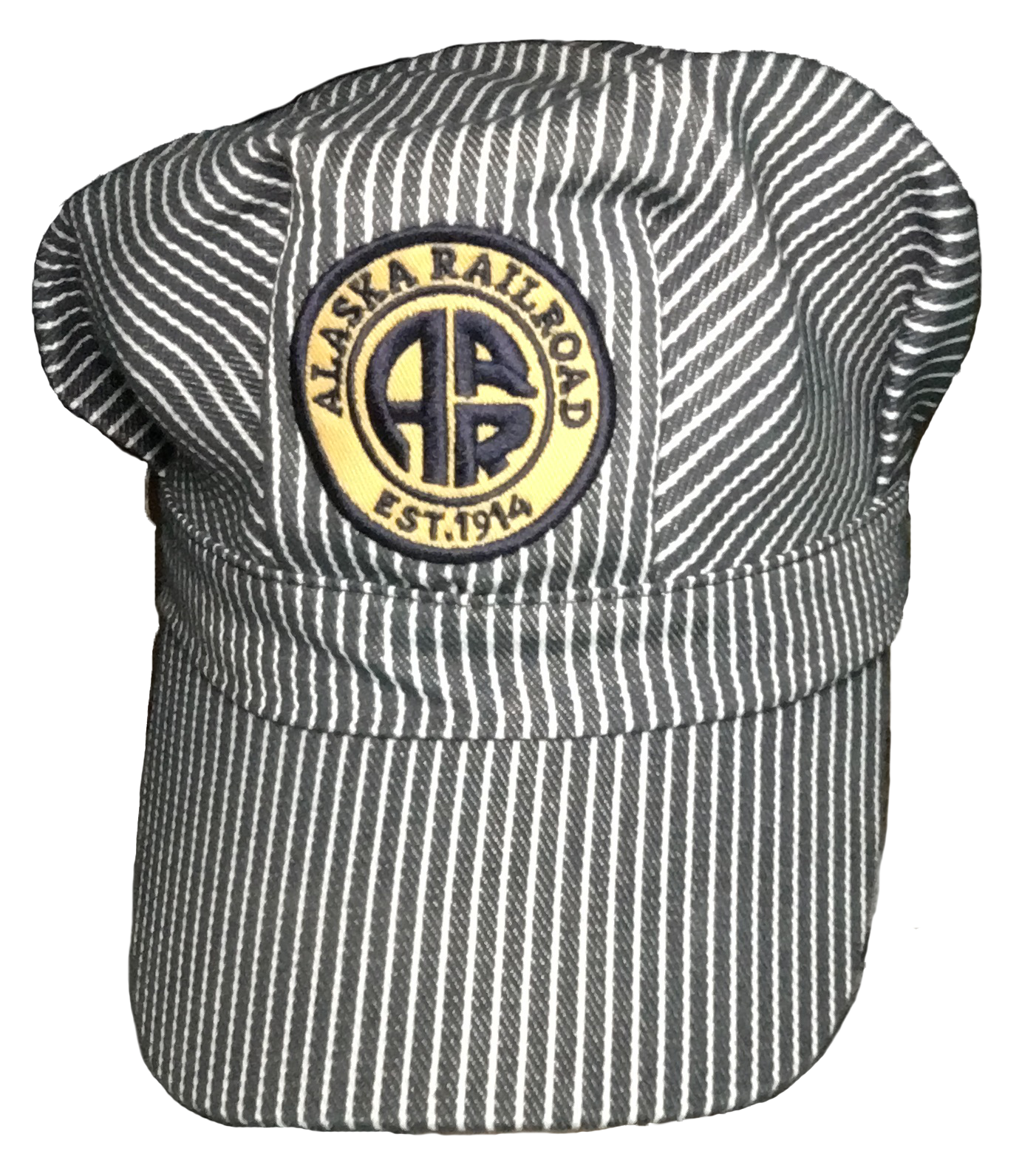
Alaska Railroad cap

== See also ==
- Bonnet, until about 1700, the usual word for brimless female headgear
- Cap (sport), metaphorical term
- List of hat styles
- List of headgear
