= Cricket cap =

Headwear worn by cricket players

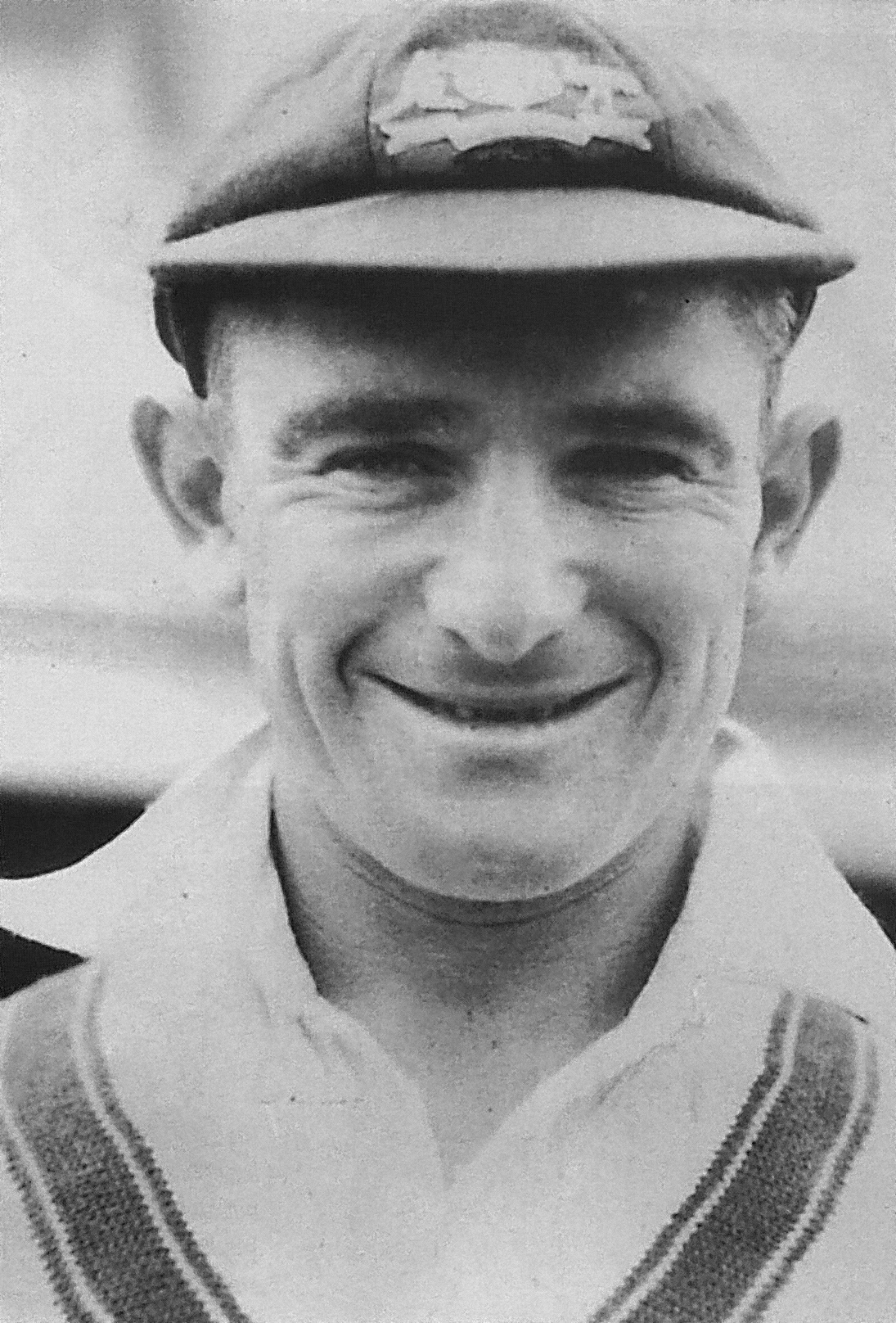
Sid Barnes wearing a cricket cap

A cricket cap is a type of soft cap, often made from felt, that is a traditional form of headwear for players of the game of cricket, regardless of age or sex. It is usually a tight-fitting skullcap, usually made of six or eight sections, with a small crescent shaped brim that points downwards over the brow to provide shade for the eyes. It is often, but not always, elasticised at the rear to hold it in place upon the wearer's head. Sometimes, rather than tight-fitting, the cricket cap comes in a baggy variety, that is always kept in place by elastic. The style of cap is also often used as official headwear as part of school uniforms for boys from private schools, particularly in the United Kingdom and throughout the Commonwealth of Nations. Although not common in the modern period, the cricket cap used to be a fashionable form of headwear for people who were casually dressed, and not necessarily worn just for playing the game.

== Description ==
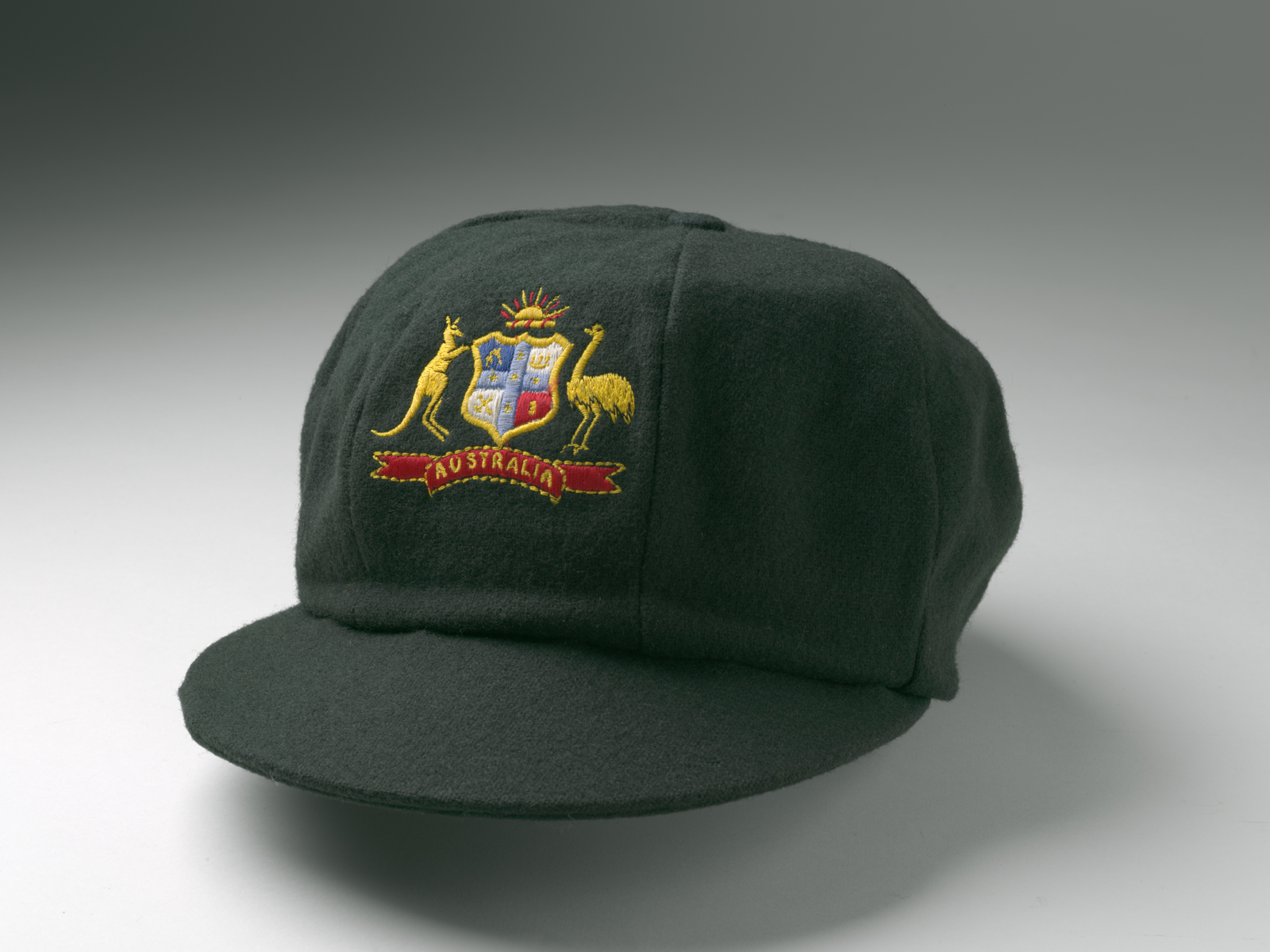
Australian baggy green cricket cap

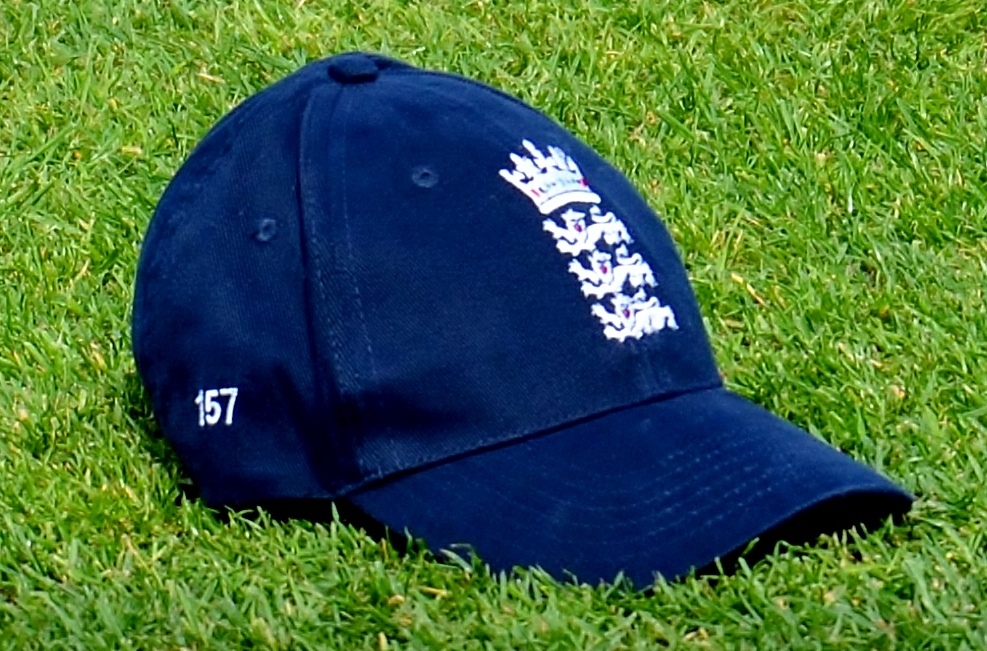
Sophie Ecclestone's traditional England cricket cap (number 157) is made of dark blue wool. There are eight panels, with the ECB ensignia at the front. Unlike the Australian style, in the English and Welsh cap the wool is not baggy and the visor narrower and longer. In this image, the slight 'bagginess' is because it is not being worn

Cricket caps are usually, but not always multi-coloured in the colours of the cricket club or school for which the cap is designed to represent. Sometimes they are particularly elaborately patterned with different sections in different colours, or different coloured rings or hoops around them. At international level, the cap is traditionally made from a single colour. However, in recent years in particular, many cricket teams, particularly for limited overs cricket have opted to wear baseball caps, rather than traditional cricket caps, but the style is still quite popular for first-class cricket teams, as well as Test cricket sides.

The origins of the cricket cap are hard to discern, however prints showing the game being played in the eighteenth century, already depict players wearing a variety similar versions of the traditional cricket cap.

Perhaps the most famous version of the cricket cap in the modern setting is the baggy green cricket cap of the Australian cricket team, for which the players and fans of Australia hold a degree of reverence. The cap is treated with a degree of mysticism, and players who have long careers often refuse to replace the original one they receive as they often feel the cap is a lucky talisman. This sometimes results in players who have long careers wearing their cricket caps in quite a tattered state. The Australian side has long worn their baggy cricket cap, rather than alternatives such as a sun hat, for the first session of each match as a symbol of team solidarity.

== Other usage ==
=== Presentation cap ===
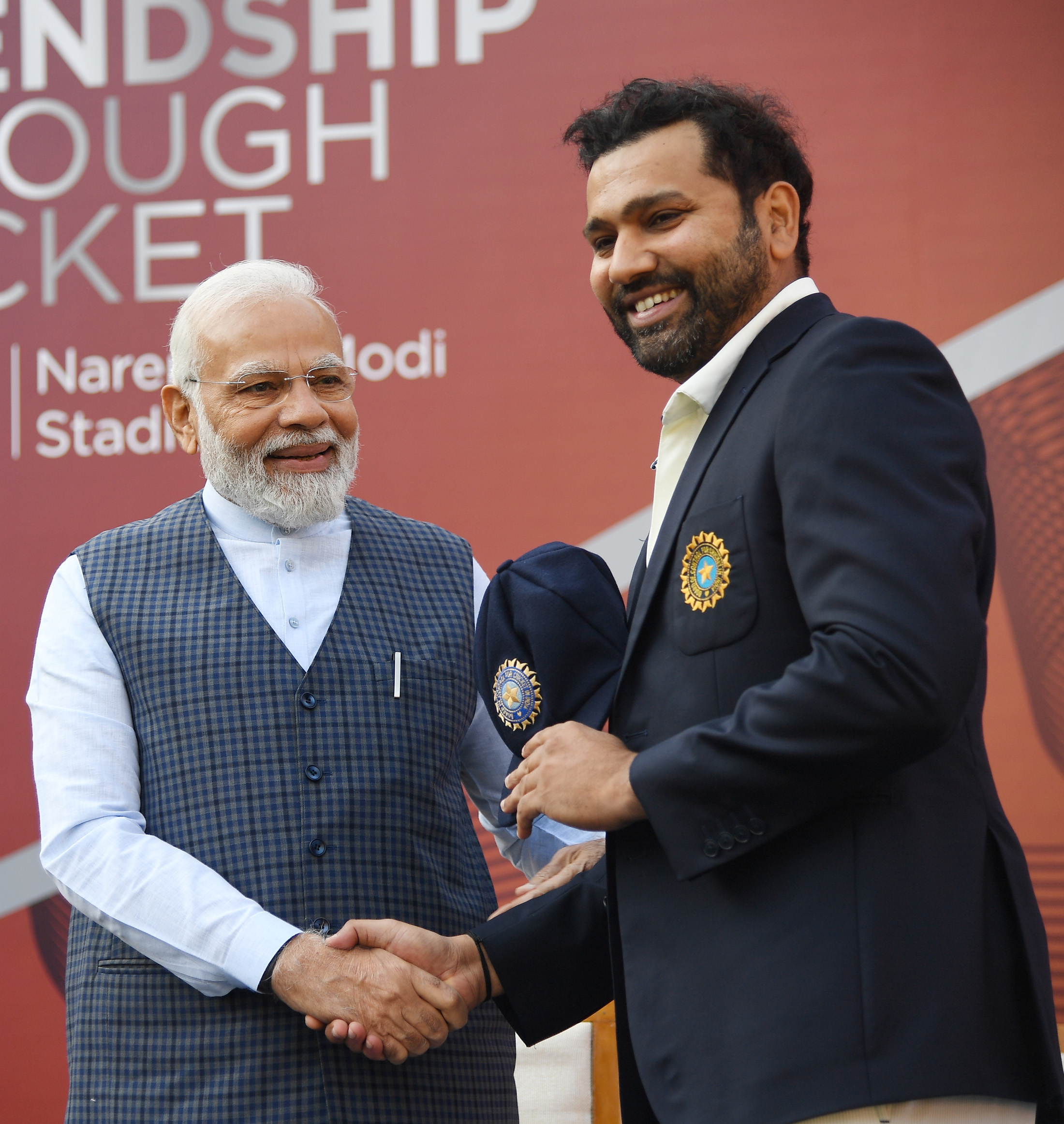
Rohit Sharma being presented his match cap by Indian PM Narendra Modi at the 75 Years of Friendship through Cricket Event.

Players who represent international cricket sides are often presented with a cap ceremonially before their debut. This is called "receiving their first cap". The cap is numbered according to how many players have represented that side before them. For example, Indian cricketer Sachin Tendulkar was the 187th player to represent India at Test level, and was awarded cap number 187. It is also sometimes used to refer to the number of times a player has played. Tendulkar played 200 Tests for India, so therefore he is said to have received 200 caps. While an actual cap may not necessarily be presented on every occasion, ceremonial cap presentations are often made for milestone appearances such as a player's 50th or 100th Test, in addition to debuts.

Some countries also award a domestic type generally known as a "county cap". The latter system is most commonly applied in English and Welsh county cricket. Most counties do not automatically award caps to players on their first appearance; instead, they have to be "earned" through good performances. Indeed, one can play at the highest domestic level for several years, and have a quite significant career in first-class cricket, without ever winning a cap.

The world record for the number of caps in Test cricket is held by Sachin Tendulkar of India, who has, over the course of a 24-year career, collected 200. Tendulkar also holds the record for One Day Internationals, with 463 caps.

=== School cap ===
In the mid-19th century, the wearing of soft caps for cricket, football and other sports in British public schools, led to their adoption as part of a school uniform. By the 20th century, they were almost universal headwear for boys at both private and state schools, but shortages during the Second World War began their slow decline, perhaps accelerated by the 1960s fashion for long hair. They are now only worn at some preparatory schools. As an example, the Manchester Grammar School introduced their school cap in 1889, which was blue with lighter blue hoops and a silver badge depicting an owl; it was phased out in the late-1960s.

=== Cub cap ===
When Robert Baden-Powell created the Wolf Cub section for younger boys within Scouting, he designed a uniform that he considered age-appropriate. The first uniform specifications, published in 1917, specified a green cap with yellow piping. The Scout Association in the United Kingdom discontinued all headgear in 1989, but Cubs in several other countries and in traditional Scouting associations continue to wear caps.

=== School and Cub cap gallery ===
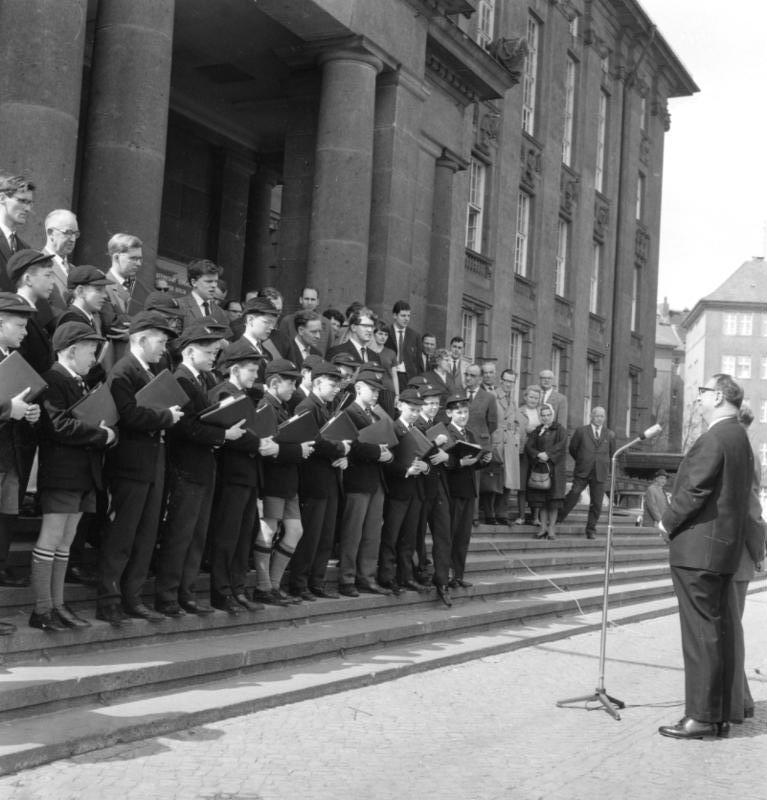
An English choir wearing their school caps in 1963

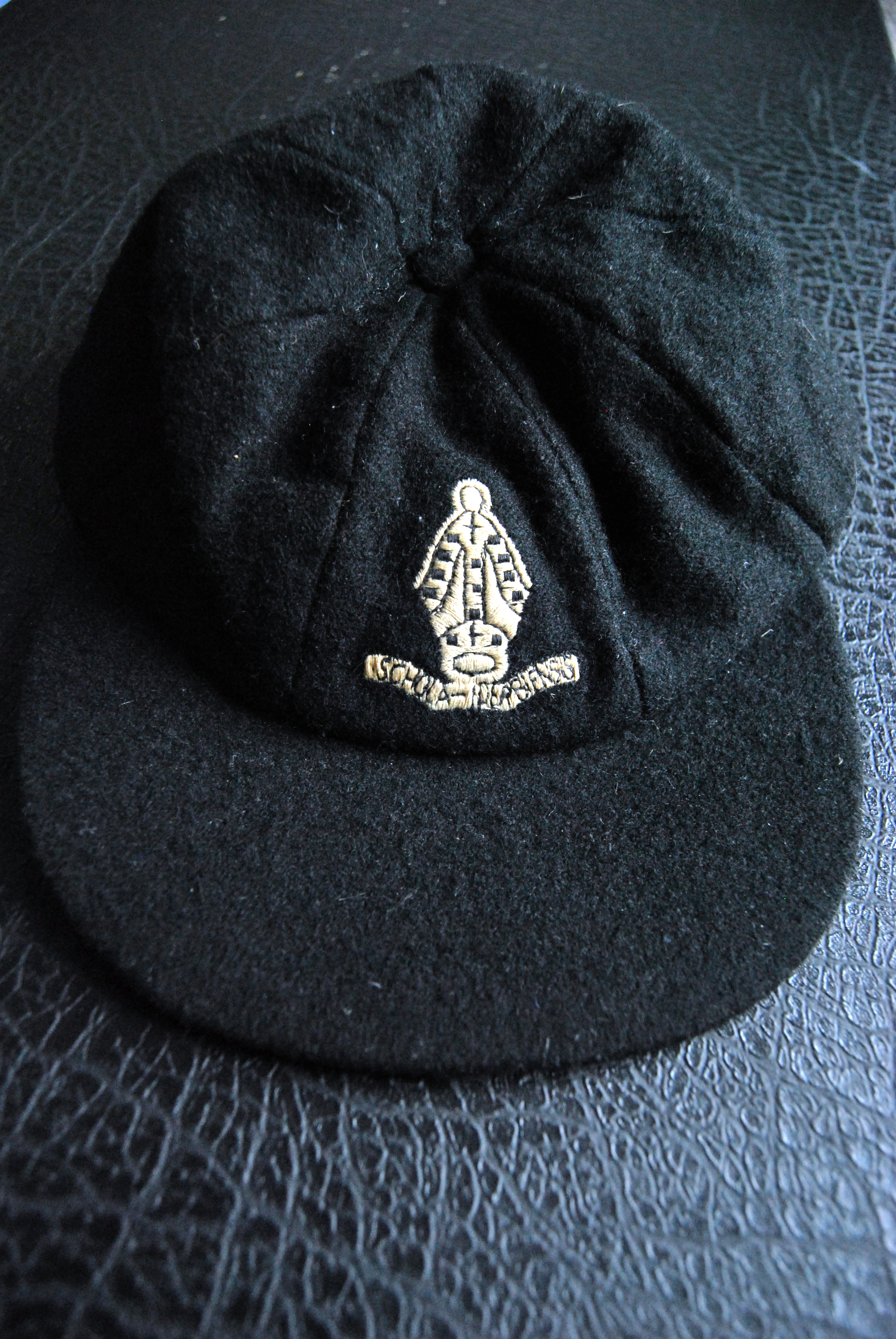
Derby School cap, mid-1960s.

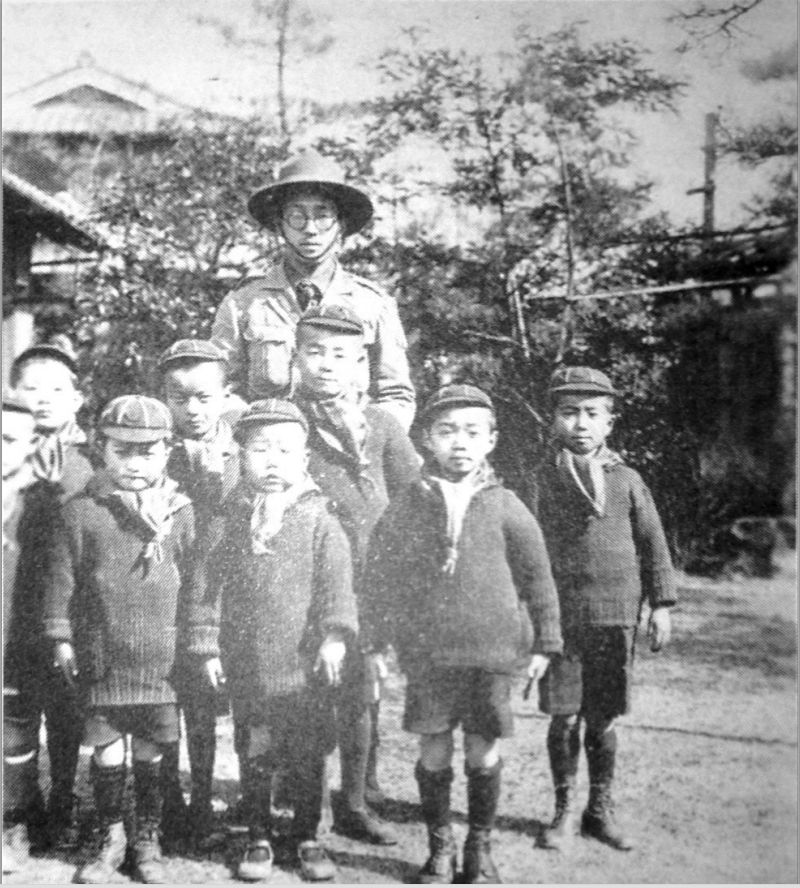
Japanese Cub Scouts wearing Cub caps in 1924

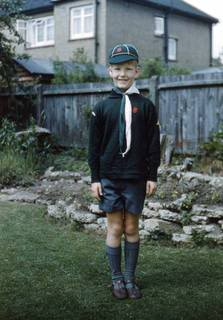
A British Wolf Cub in 1960

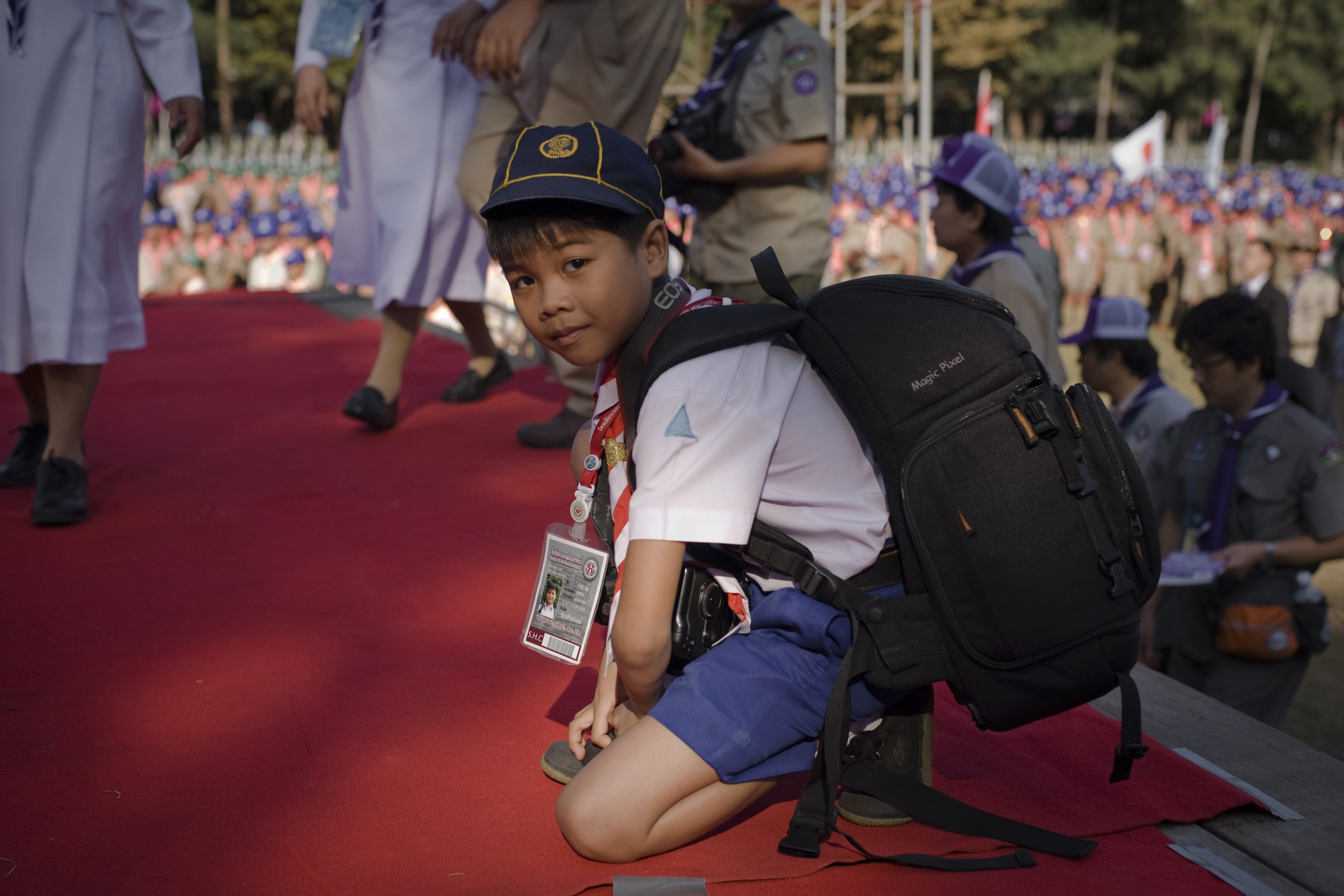
A Thai Cub Scout in 2010

== See also ==
- Cap (sport)
- Baggy green
- Flat cap
- List of hat styles
- List of headgear
