= Baggy green =

Australian cricket team cap

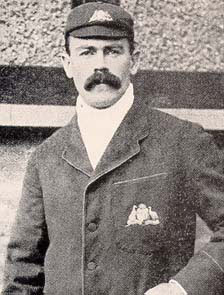
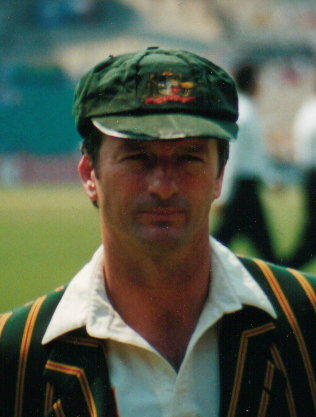
Left: Former Australian captain Joe Darling sporting the baggy green in the early 1900s
Right: Steve Waugh wearing his well-worn baggy green cap in 2002

The baggy green is a cricket cap of dark myrtle green colour, which has been worn by Australian Test cricketers since around the turn of the twentieth century. The cap was not originally baggy as evidenced by photographs of early players. The cap is a symbol of national pride in Australia, and was described by the chief executive of the MCC as the "most famous cricket cap in the world".

== History ==
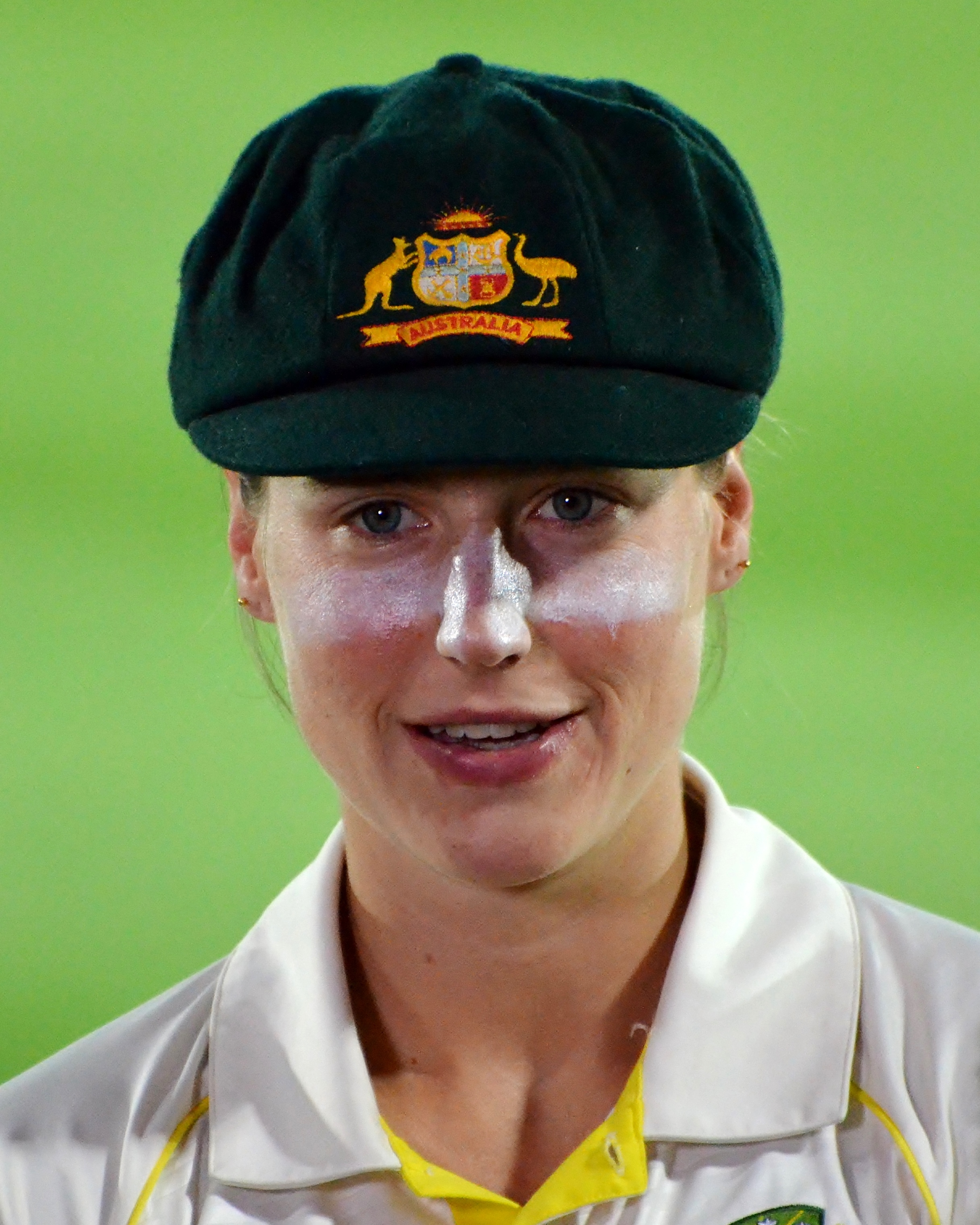
Ellyse Perry wearing the women's baggy green, with red text on a gold background

The baggy green cap was originally supplied to the player as part of a kit of equipment, and a new one was routinely issued for each tour, with the year number on it. Some former Australian players have used their cap for "non-cricketing" purposes: Bill Lawry used the cap while cleaning his pigeon's nest, while Bill Ponsford was wore the cap while painting a fence. Ian Chappell never kept any of his baggy green caps.

The importance of the baggy green as a symbol grew significantly in the 1990s, chiefly due to the efforts of captains Mark Taylor and Steve Waugh. Waugh regularly expressed his belief that the honouring of the traditions of the game was critical to the success of a team: "To be able to partake of these rituals and traditions has meant you have been awarded the highest honour in Australian cricket — you have been selected to play for your country." In the early 1990s an unofficial practice emerged among Test players of never replacing their baggy green cap, most notably by Steve Waugh. Players only rarely request a replacement cap from Cricket Australia and the increasingly dilapidated state of an ageing baggy green cap is a symbol of seniority amongst the players in the team.

During his captaincy Taylor instituted a pre-match ceremony for the awarding of a cap. This continued under Waugh, who introduced a refinement whereby new players would receive their "baggy green" from a past player of a similar discipline (batsman, spin bowler, etc.). Ponting changed it again, making the presentation himself rather than using a former player. Another tradition instituted by Taylor (but suggested by Steve Waugh, and one that has also continued) is the practice of all players wearing the cap during the first session in the field of a Test match, as a symbol of solidarity. Even Shane Warne, known for his preference for a floppy sun hat, observed this tradition without question. Modern players seldom wear the baggy green cap while batting, choosing a protective helmet instead, especially when facing faster bowlers.

== Coat of arms ==
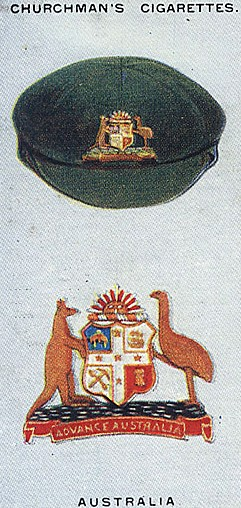
The cap illustrated (with an enlargement of the device it bears) on a cigarette card from 1928

Sometimes incorrectly called a "crest", the "achievement" or coat of arms on the Baggy Green cap is a pre-federation symbol representing Australian commercial endeavours of the time: wool-growing, shipping, mining and agriculture.

It consists of: a crest (being a rising sun); over a torse (or wreath) of red and gold; over a shield (bearing images of a sheep, a sailing ship, a pick-axe and shovel and a garb of wheat, all quartered by a southern cross); supporters (being a kangaroo and an emu); all over a motto ("Australia") on a scroll.

The baggy green worn by male players has the motto in gold on a red background; on the women's baggy green, the motto and background colours are reversed.

Contrary to a common belief, with the exception of the supporters and the motto, this coat of arms is entirely different from the present and any former national coat of arms. Since 1912 the coat of arms of Australia has borne the badges of the six Australian states, enclosed and unified on a shield under a wreath of blue and gold bearing a Commonwealth Star.

The device on the cap is sometimes referred to as Australia's Cricket Coat of Arms, although it has otherwise been abandoned by Cricket Australia. It is replicated on the protective helmet, but not on any other badged item of clothing worn by the Australian team. These now feature the current emblem of Cricket Australia, being a modern distorted shield with the ubiquitous Southern Cross on a green and gold field of a rising sun and a wicket casting a shadow on a pitch.

== Rarity and value ==
Unlike virtually any other item of cricket kit, replicas of the Baggy Green are not licensed for sale by Cricket Australia, the theory being that the Baggy Green can never be bought, only earned. The item is not available from the Cricket Australia Store, or from Kookaburra Sport, the company that manufactures the Baggy Green. Any replicas available online are unofficial.

Baggy green caps can in some cases be prized as valuable sporting memorabilia. The cap worn by Sir Donald Bradman during his final season in 1948 sold in 2003 for A$425,000, and the 1953 cap of Keith Miller sold at auction for A$35,000. Even the caps of lesser-known players have fetched figures above A$10,000. The baggy green of Shane Warne was sold at auction, purchased by the Commonwealth Bank in January 2020 for A$1,007,500. Warne's cap is to be taken on a national tour, and subsequently put on display in the International Cricket Hall of Fame. The proceeds from the auction were used to support emergency services responding to 2019–20 Australian bushfire season.

== See also ==
- List of hat styles
- Cricket cap
- Baseball cap
- Beret
- Flat cap
