= Ascot cap =

Rounded men's hard cap

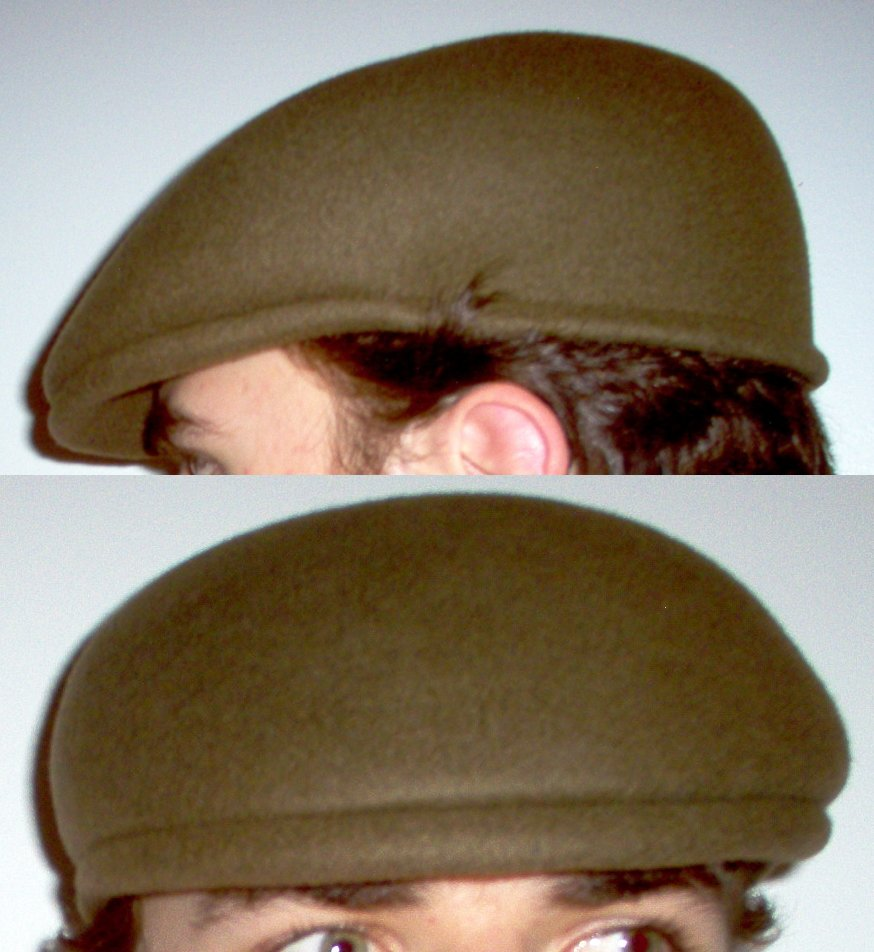

The Ascot cap, also known as the Coffey cap or Lippincott cap, is a men's hard cap similar to the flat cap, but distinguished by its hardness and rounded shape. Ascot caps are typically made from fur or wool felt and worn in the autumn or winter, but straw Ascots also exist for warmer weather.

Unlike the flat cap, the inside is not lined with silk but the closed-in design and softness of felt still provides comfort and warmth. The style dates back to 1900.

== See also ==
- List of hat styles
- Coppola cap
- Flat cap
- Newsboy cap
