= Newsboy cap =

Headgear similar to a flat cap

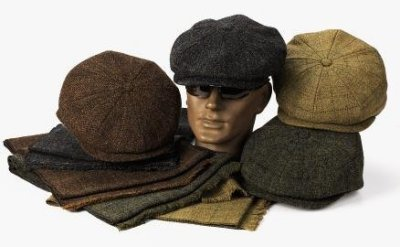
Eight-paneled caps in various colors

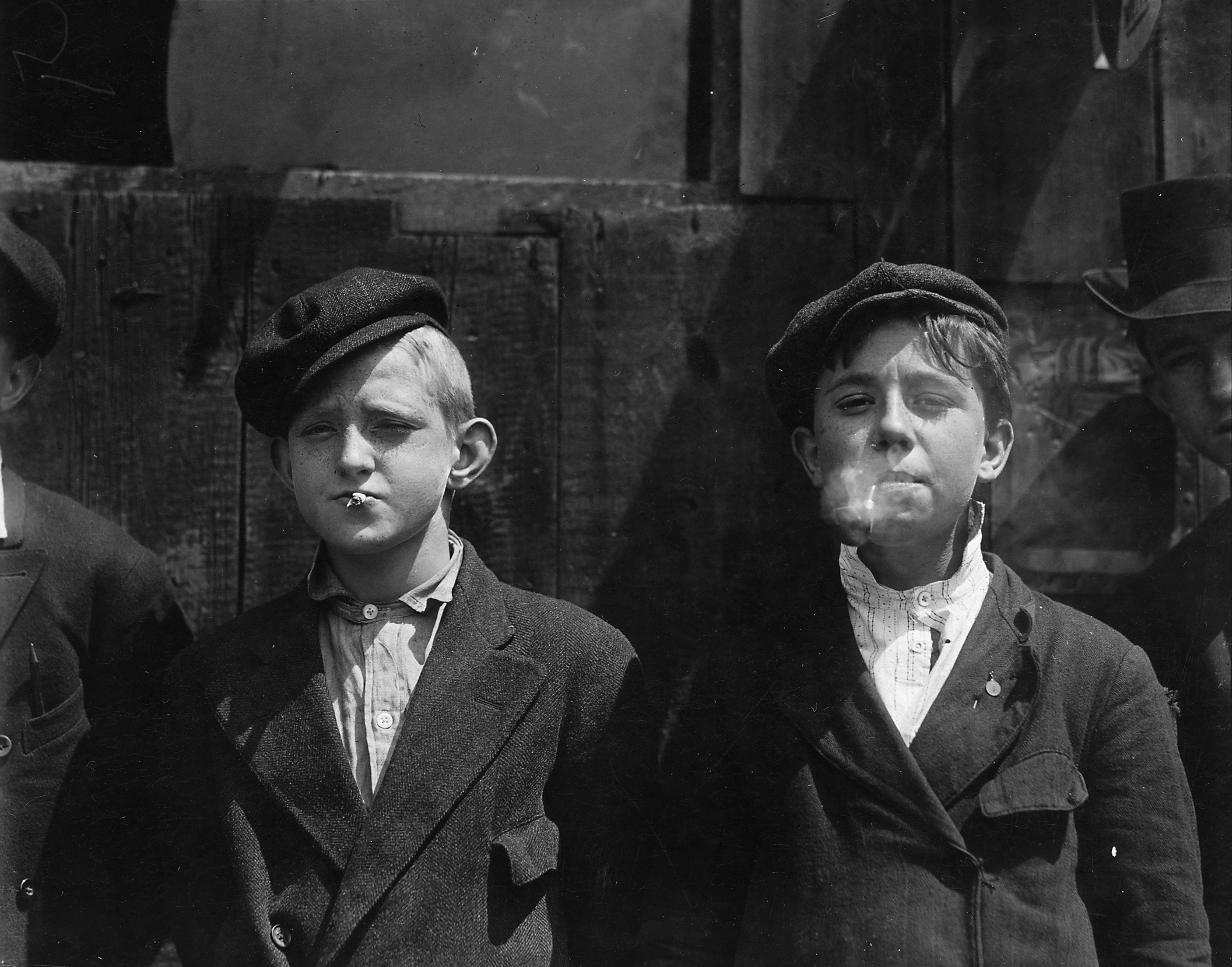
Newsboys in St. Louis, Missouri, US, 1910

The newsboy cap, newsie cap, Gatsby, jeff cap, or baker boy hat (British) is a casual-wear cap similar in style to the flat cap.

It has a similar overall shape and stiff peak (visor) in front as a flat cap, but the body of the cap is rounder, made of eight pieces, fuller, and paneled with a button on top, and often with a button attaching the front to the brim (as the flat cap sometimes has).

== History ==
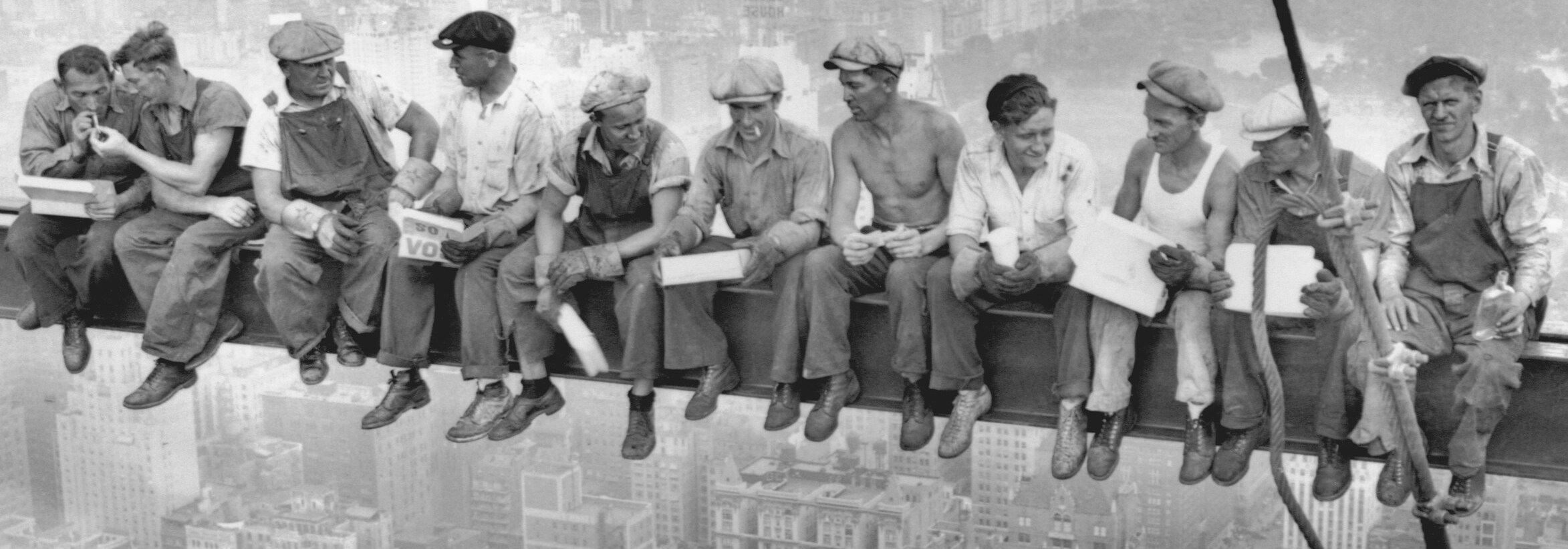
Ironworkers wearing newsboy caps in the famous Lunch atop a Skyscraper picture, 1932

At the end of the 19th century this style of cap was called a "golf cap," worn by both men and boys. Eventually, this headwear became associated with working-class boys, especially newspaper boys. The style was also preferred by middle-class businessmen who disliked the bulkiness of top hats, also popular at the time.

Flat caps were very common for North American and European men and boys of all classes during the early 20th century and were especially prevalent during the 1910s and 1920s, particularly among the working "lower" classes. A great many photographs of the period show these caps worn not only by newsboys, but by dockworkers, high steel workers, shipwrights, costermongers, farmers, beggars, bandits, artisans, and tradesmen of many types. This is also well attested in novels and films of this period and just after.

While they were worn by boys and men of all social classes, they were worn by the "upper" classes primarily for leisure activities, and the style became associated with well-to-do country sportsmen, drivers, and wealthy golfers.

== Resurgence ==
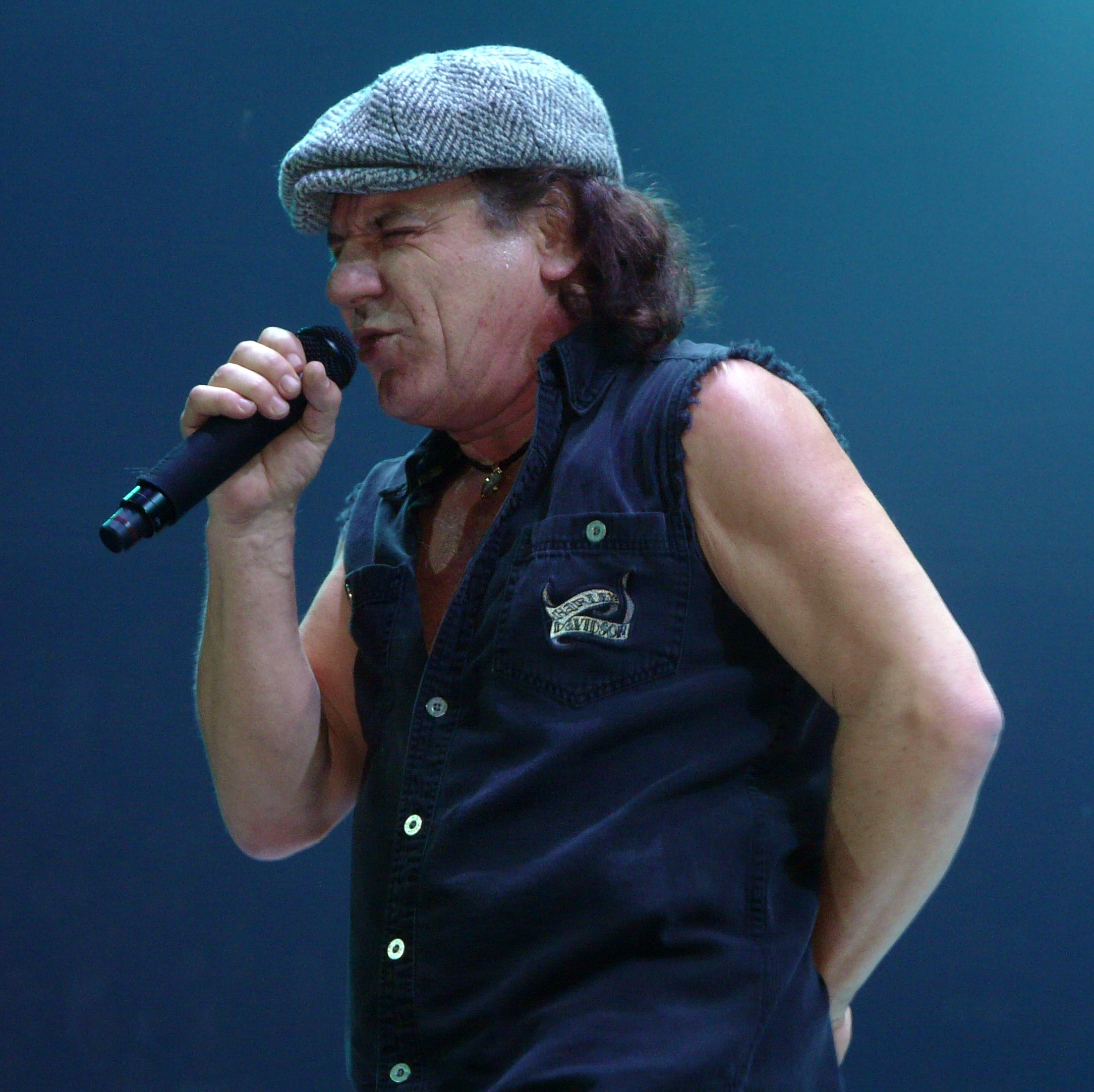
AC/DC singer Brian Johnson

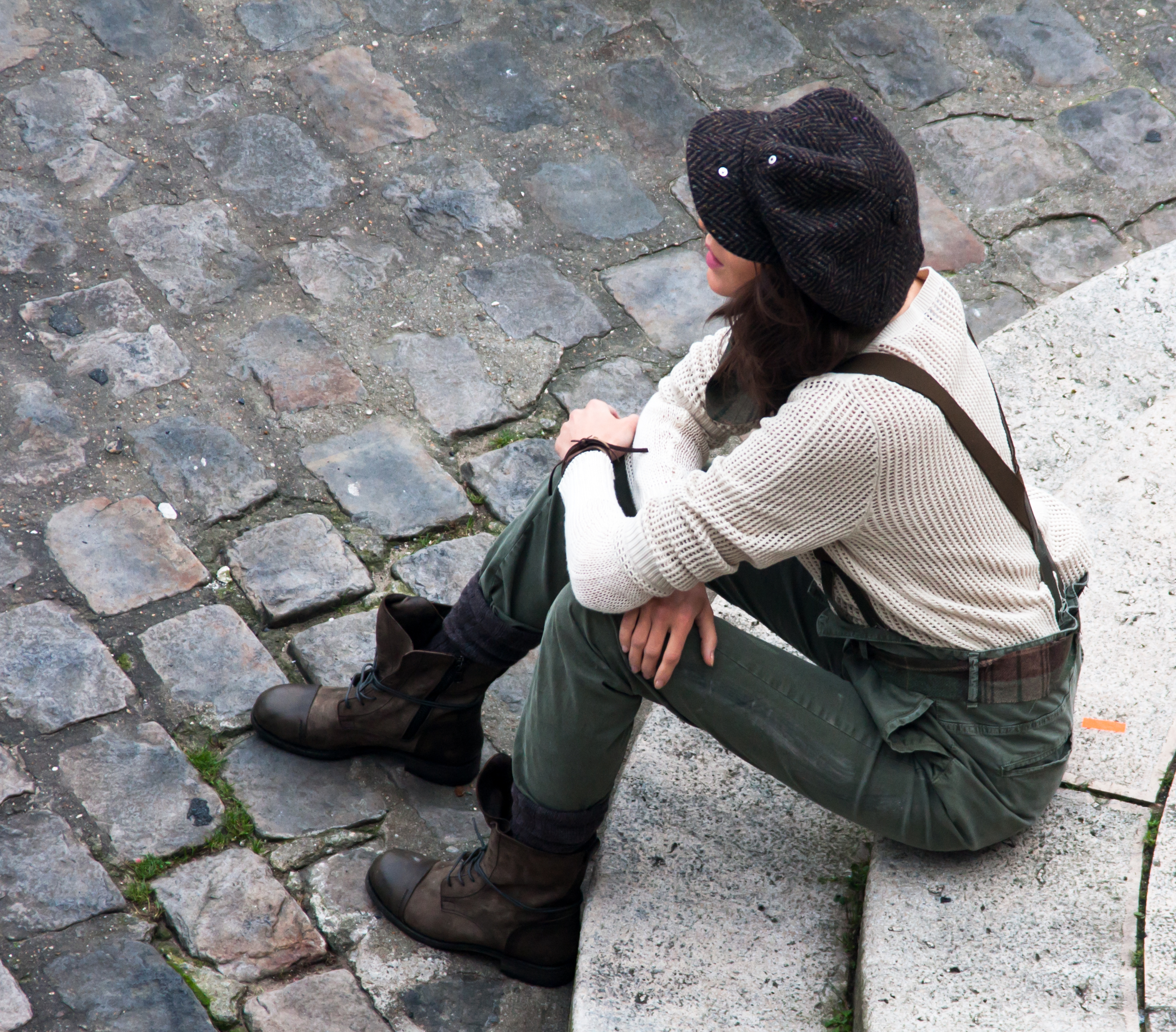
Parisian woman wearing a newsboy cap

Although traditionally a men's cap, it has seen a resurgence as it has become popular with affluent women and fashion houses in the 2000s. It has also become popular among the hipster subculture. Baker boy hats are now seen in many high street retailers. For summer, many girls and women are choosing soft cotton options as the brim offers sun protection. In winter, wool blend baker boy hats are a popular option for those who want to wear a natural material. In 2011, floral cottons became a trend following a renewed interest in home sewing.

Roots Canada outfitted the Canadian Olympic team at the 1998 Winter Olympics in Nagano, Japan. The outfit's most popular item was the red "poorboy" cap (or poor boy cap), worn backwards.

Harry Hibbs, a Newfoundland accordionist, wore this style of hat as his trademark headgear. Brian Johnson of the rock band AC/DC is frequently photographed wearing this style of hat. Athlete David Beckham is frequently photographed wearing his signature baker boy hat from James Lock & Co. WWE wrestler Sami Zayn wears this style of hat. Impractical Jokers's Brian Quinn commonly wears this style of hat in many of episodes. The hat is worn by the Shelby family and their associates in the British TV series Peaky Blinders.

== See also ==
- List of hat styles
- Ascot cap
- Coppola cap
- Flat cap
