= Coppola cap =

Flat cap traditional to Sicily and Calabria

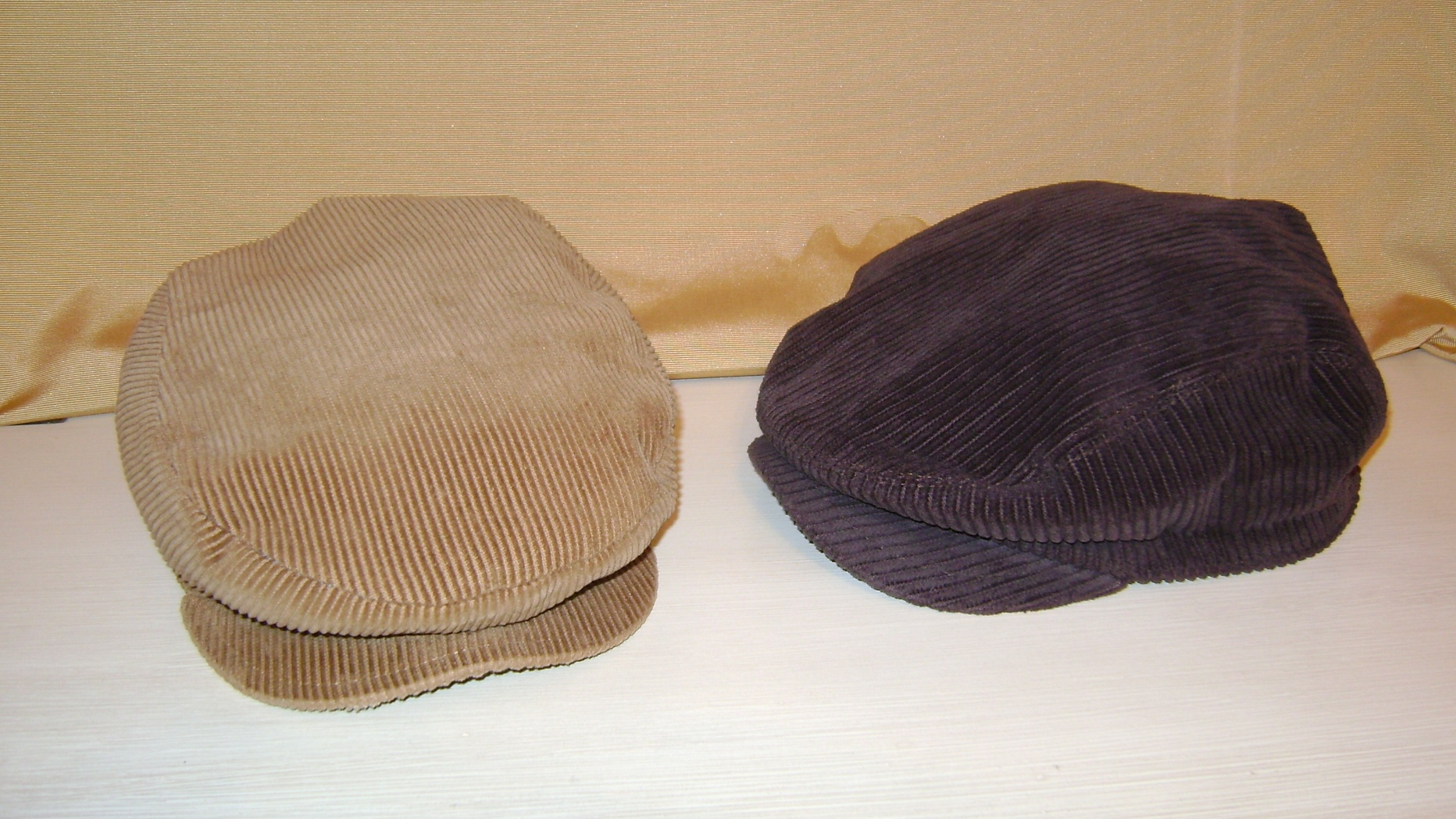
Coppola caps

The coppola (Italian pronunciation: [ˈkɔppola]) is a traditional kind of flat cap typically worn in Sicily, Campania and Calabria, where is it known as còppula or birritta, and also seen in Malta, Greece (where it is known as tragiáska, Greek: τραγιάσκα), some territories in Turkey, Corsica, and Sardinia (where it came to be known, in the local language, as berritta, cicía, and bonete or bonetu, possibly from the Latin abonnis). Typical materials include wool, tweed, cotton, corduroy and linen.

Today, the coppola is widely regarded, at least in Italy, as an iconic symbol of Sicilian culture.

== History ==
One popular theory of the coppola is that it originates in England, where the tradition of civil caps has been found at least since the late 16th century during the reign of the Tudors, when on Sundays and on holidays all males over six years old – with the exception of nobles and high-ranking people – had to wear woolen headdresses produced only and exclusively in England: so, in fact, it provided for an act of parliament of 1571, the short purpose of which was to support the domestic production of wool, thus protecting it from the import of foreign goods. This type of headgear belonged to the so-called "flat cap", a type of cap initially known as bonnet which is characterized primarily by its flat dome; at the same time, for example, the "Tudor bonnet" also belongs, a variant of the flat cap accompanied by a circular aquifer, now in use especially in academic clothing.

First used by English nobles during the late 18th century, the coppola began to be used in Sicily and Calabria in the early 20th century as a driving cap, usually worn when at the wheel driving the car. The coppola is usually made in tweed.

Today the flat cap is present in numerous countries, although its diffusion is now more limited than in the past. Vintage fashion, however, has revitalized the image of the flat cap at the turn of the 20th and 21st centuries, thanks also to the popularity of various actors, singers, sportsmen, etc. who sometimes wear flat caps of different shapes, thus promoting a relaunch on the market.

== Adoption in Sicily and southern Italy ==
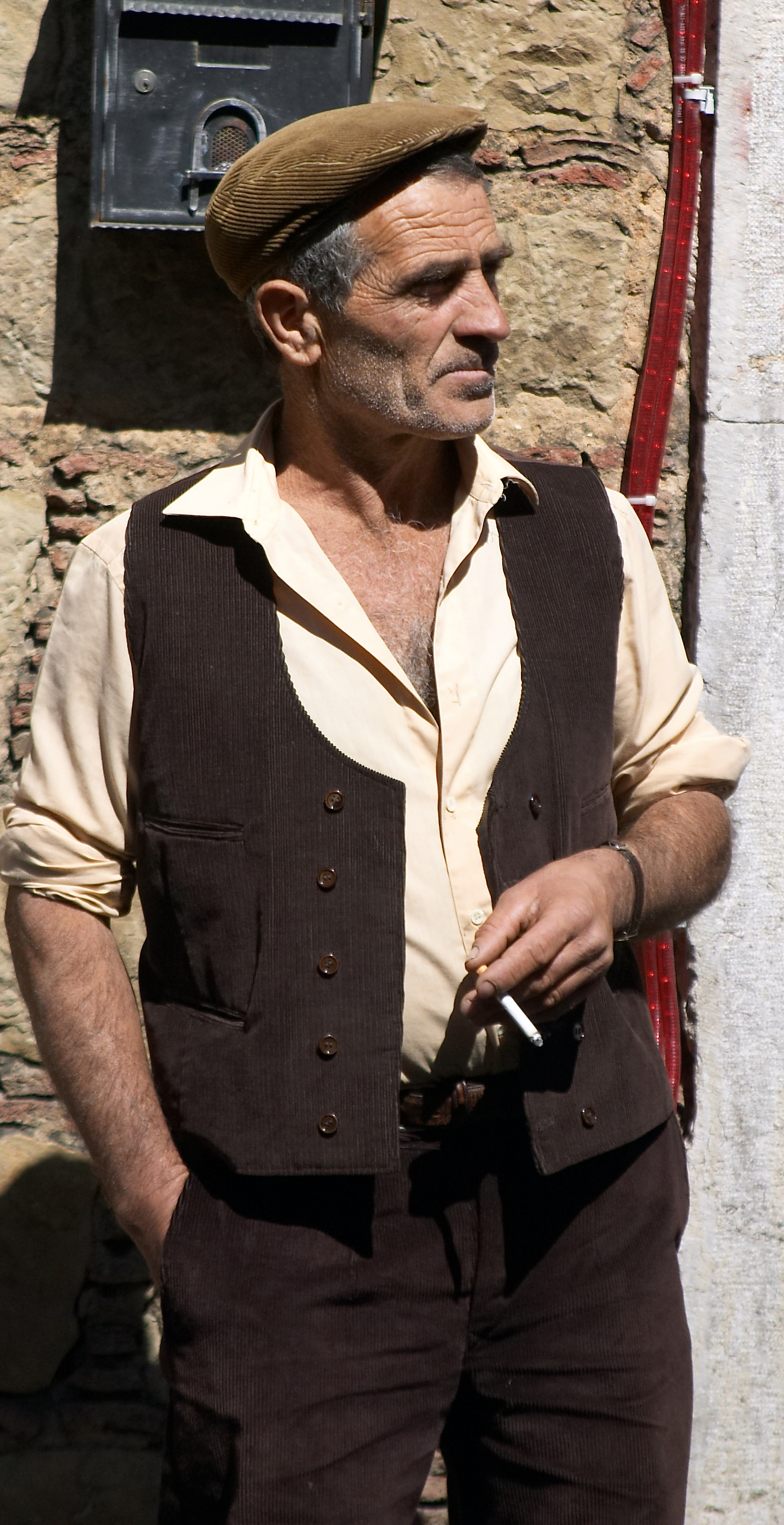
A man wearing a coppola

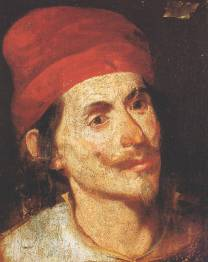
Portrait of Masaniello with his "red coppola" on his head

The origin of the name coppola is likely to be a Sicilian, Calabrian or Apulian adaptation of the Latin word caput ("head"). By extension, còppula is also Sicilian for "head". The word then became popular also in the rest of Italy, and was quickly acquired by Italian language by extension. Different colors of the hat were used to signify different levels of socio-economic importance. While the ruling class and English nobles traditionally wore a white version, the black coppola was typically reserved for the Working class, the brown coppola was for Farmers and field workers, and the blue coppola was used for Sailors.

In Sicily the tradition of coppola stands between the late 19th century and the first half of the 20th century, a number of English families settled in Sicily in search of investment. Outsiders across the Country, as it may be, carried their costumes and clothing with them, including the flat cap, which, in a spirit of emulation, was adopted by the Sicilian people themselves as an integral part of their way of dressing. Sicilians have always covered their heads as it provides protection from the hot sun in summer. Before the coppola was in general use, forms of turban were in widespread for men and women of Sicily and parts of Southern Italy. However they had in a later stage lost popularity to the coppola, which has become a cornerstone of Sicilian Culture, not a simple import cap but a real symbol of belonging to the island's community and its traditions.

However plausible, this historical reconstruction is not entirely certain and the English origin remains doubtful: the use of the term coppola throughout history is not explained above all, a word that boasts a long tradition in southern Italy and that has been in use since before the 19th century, as evidenced by some ancient writings. In 1789, for example, a vocabulary of Neapolitan dialect bears both the coppola voice and the coppolone derivative and describes the headdress as a "peasant biretta (ed. farmer's cap), common as a result of villani", without adding any other details about the shape or style of the cap. To the same century also belongs a Neapolitan song, entitled O cunto 'e Masaniello which, narrating the story of the famous Masaniello, alludes among other things to "its red coppola", a sign that the term was already known and of common use at a popular level.

The case of Masaniello, in this case, offers an interesting starting point for reflection on the concept of coppola, especially on its most remote origins, both in a historical sense and from a purely linguistic point of view. In ancient depictions, in fact, the famous Neapolitan rebel always wears a red headdress – the so-called "red coppola" of eighteenth-century singing – but the shape of the cap has nothing to do with modern coppola: it is, if anything, of a kind of fleece or Phrygian cap, symbol of freedom in the past era, it is no coincidence also taken up by the revolutionary France of the late eighteenth century that has made the bonnet rouge a real national icon (famous is the image of Marianne, the personification of the French Republic, represented precisely with a Phrygian cap of red color).

== See also ==
- List of hat styles
- Ascot cap
- Flat cap
- Newsboy cap
