= Flat cap =

Type of hat

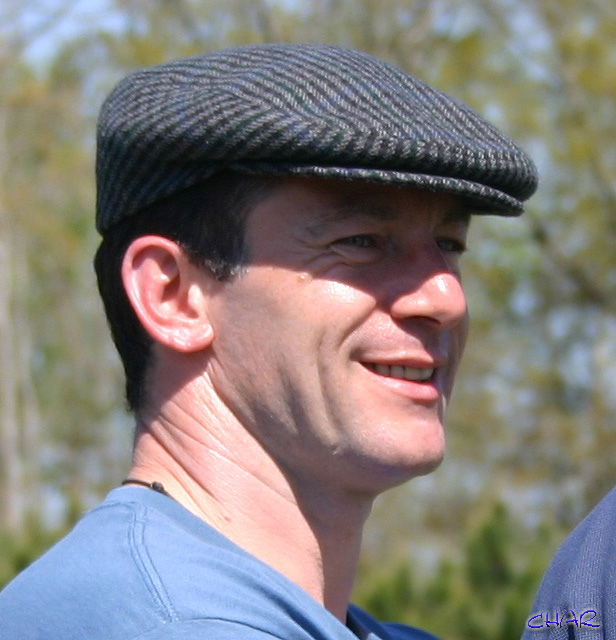
Woollen flat cap worn by the British actor Jason Isaacs (2005)

A flat cap is a rounded cap with a small stiff brim in front, originating in Northern England. The hat is also known in Ireland as a paddy cap; in Scotland as a bunnet or Galen's cap; in Wales as a Dai cap; and in the United States as an English cap or Irish cap. Various other terms exist (scally cap, cabbie cap, driver cap, golf cap, longshoreman cap, ivy cap, jeff cap, train engineer cap and sixpence amongst others). Flat caps are usually made of tweed, wool or cotton, while some are made using leather, linen or corduroy. The inside of the cap is commonly lined for comfort and warmth.

== History ==
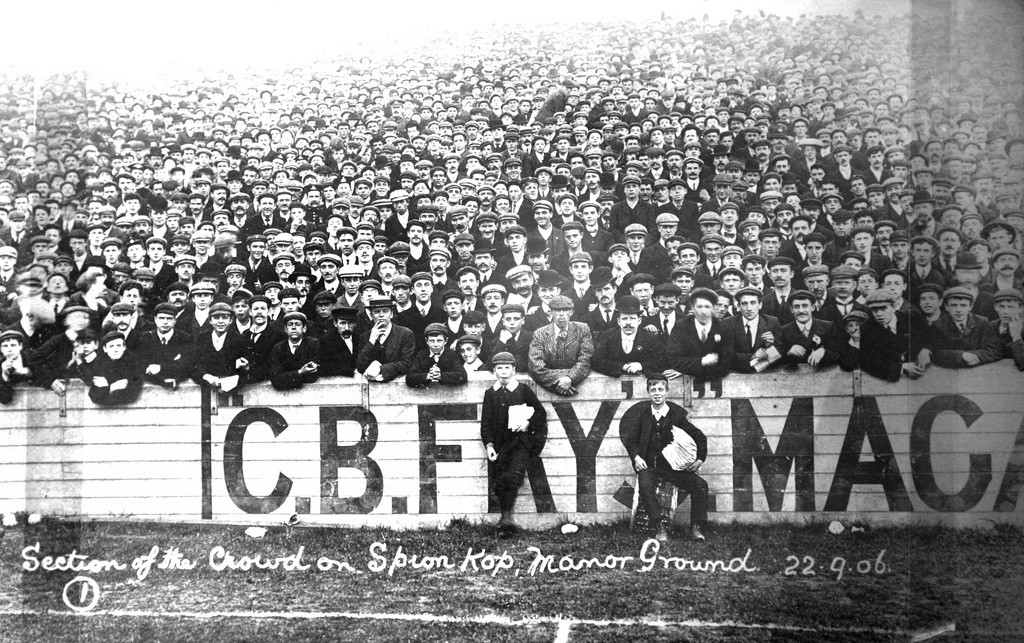
A football crowd in London in 1906, the majority are wearing flat caps.

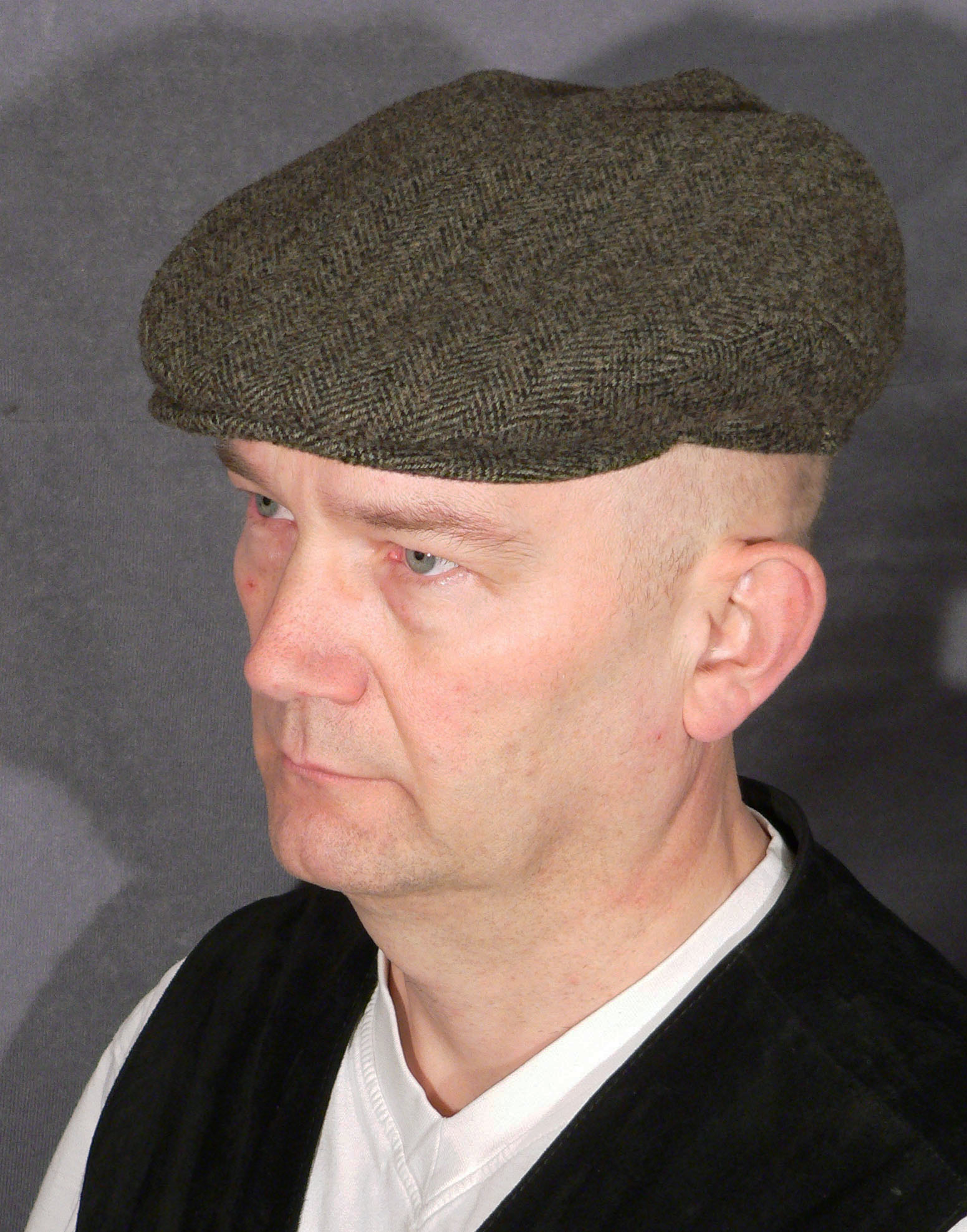
Woollen flat cap

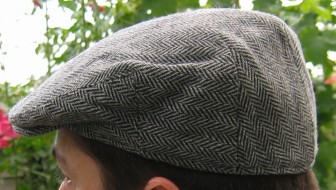
Flat cap, side view, herringbone pattern

The style can be traced back to the 16th century in Northern England, when it was more likely to be called a "bonnet". This term was replaced by "cap" before about 1700, except in Scotland, where it continues to be referred to as a bunnet in Scots.

An act in 1571 of the Parliament of England aimed to stimulate domestic wool consumption and general trade. It decreed that on Sundays and holidays, all males over 6 years of age, except for the nobility and "persons of degree", were to wear woollen caps or pay a fine of three farthings per day (equivalent to £1.39 in 2025). The act was repealed in 1597, by which time it had become firmly entrenched as a recognised mark of a commoner, such as a burgher, a tradesman or an apprentice. The style may have been the same as the Tudor bonnet still used in some styles of academic dress.

In the 19th and early-20th centuries, when men predominantly wore some form of headgear, flat caps were commonly worn throughout Great Britain and Ireland. Versions in finer cloth were also casual countryside wear for upper-class men. Flat caps were worn by fashionable young men in the 1920s. Boys of all classes in Britain wore caps during this period; a peaked school cap of prescribed colour and design, of more rounded shape than men's flat caps, was part of the normal school uniform.

The flat cap made its way to southern Italy in the late 1800s, likely brought by British servicemen. In Turkey, the flat cap became the main headgear for men after it became a replacement for the fez, which was banned by Mustafa Kemal Atatürk in 1925. It also became popular in the Balkans around the same time.

In the early-20th century it was worn by working-class men in Spain and it became part of the traditional attire and folklore of Madrid, where it is called parpusa, gorra madrileña, or "Madrid Cap".

== British popular culture ==
In British popular culture the flat cap is typically associated with Yorkshire, and, more broadly, working-class men. The flat cap can also be taken to denote the upper class when affecting casualness. "A toff can be a bit of a chap as well without, as it were, losing face." In the late-20th and early-21st centuries British public figures including David Beckham, Nigel Mansell, Guy Ritchie, Richard Blackwood and then Charles, Prince of Wales wore the flat cap.

In Northern England notable wearers include: the television personality Fred Dibnah, from Bolton; the comic strip antihero Andy Capp, from Hartlepool; and the AC/DC vocalist Brian Johnson, from Gateshead.

In Peaky Blinders, a fictionalised BBC television series about a real-world defunct Birmingham-based gang, characters are seen wearing Baker Boy Caps, a similar style often confused for flat caps. It was thought, and adapted, that the gang had sewed-in razor blades on the peak of their flat caps for use as a weapon to blind their enemies.

Usage in the East End of London is illustrated by Jim Branning of the television soap opera EastEnders and Del Boy Trotter of Only Fools and Horses. Taxicab and bus drivers are often depicted wearing a flat cap, as comedically portrayed by Gareth Hale and Norman Pace's (Hale and Pace) "London cabbies" television sketches.

== Modern popularity ==
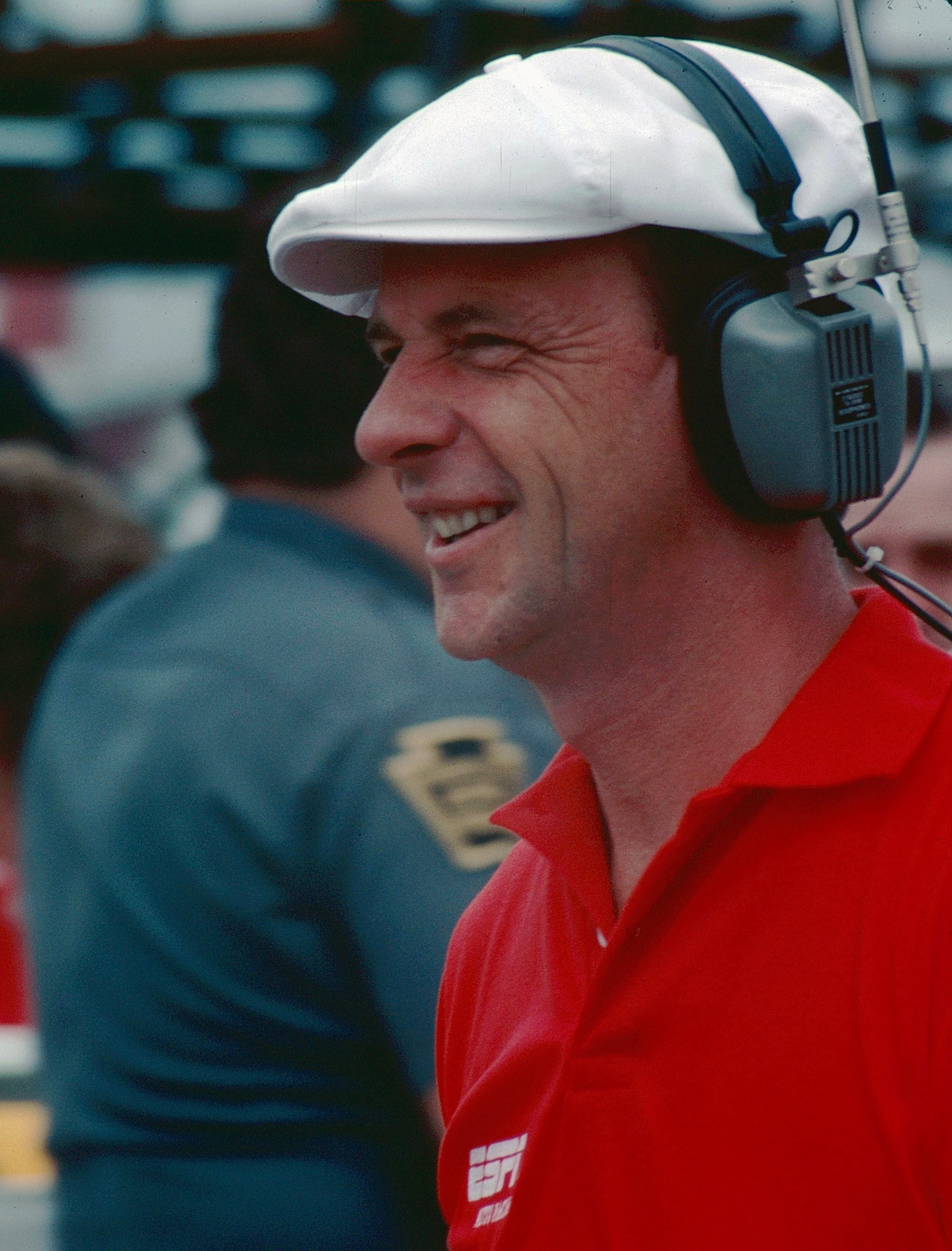
Dick Berggren is known for wearing a flat cap.

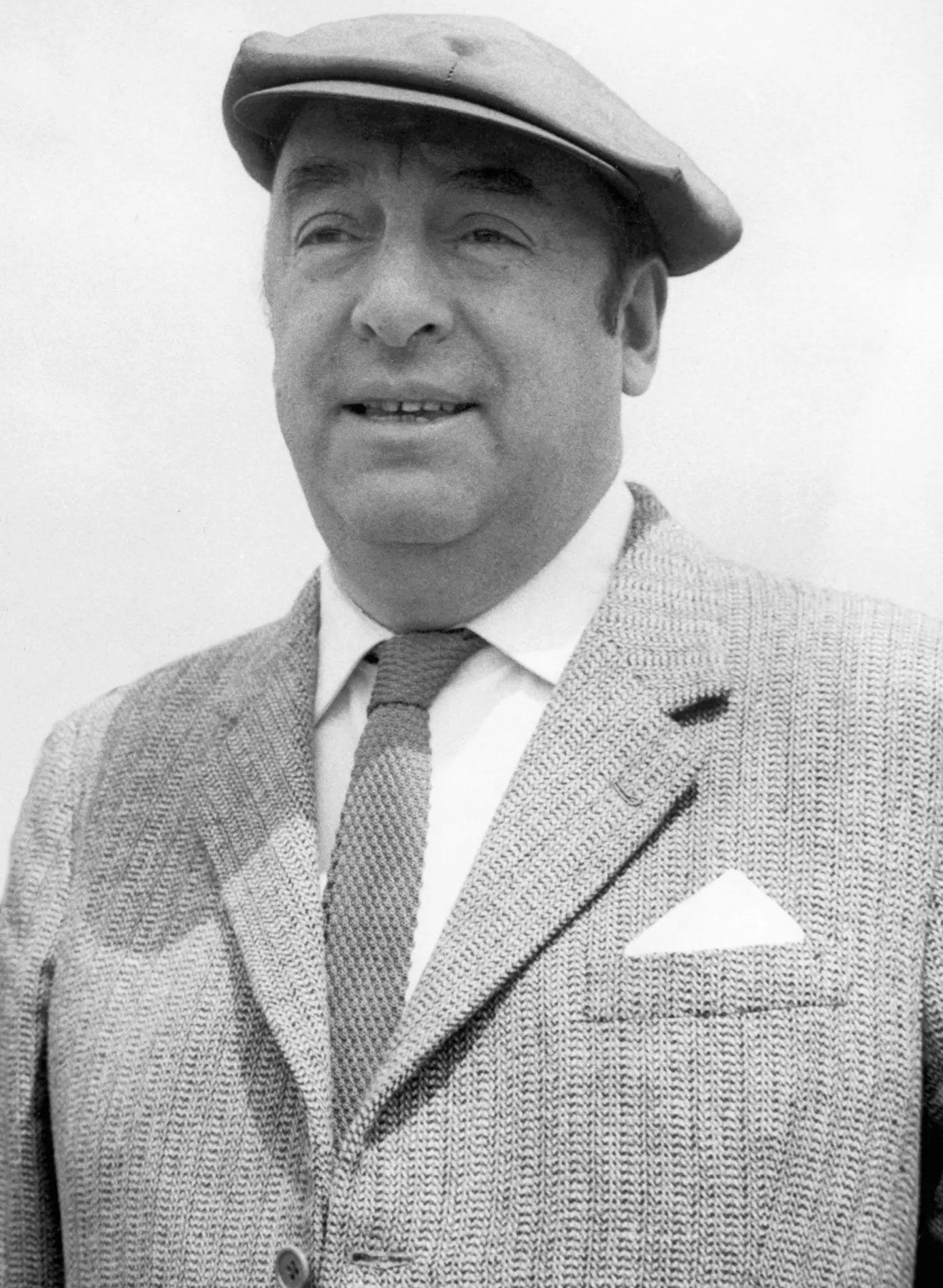
The Chilean poet Pablo Neruda was known for wearing flat caps.

The Canadian team in the 1998 Winter Olympics wore red flat caps designed by Roots Canada in the opening ceremony parade of nations. The US team in the 2008 Summer Olympics also wore white flat caps designed by Polo Ralph Lauren during the parade.

== See also ==
- List of hat styles
- Ascot cap
- Baseball cap
- British country clothing
- Coppola (cap)
- Newsboy cap
- Skipper cap
