= Fanny pack =

Small fabric pouch worn like a belt

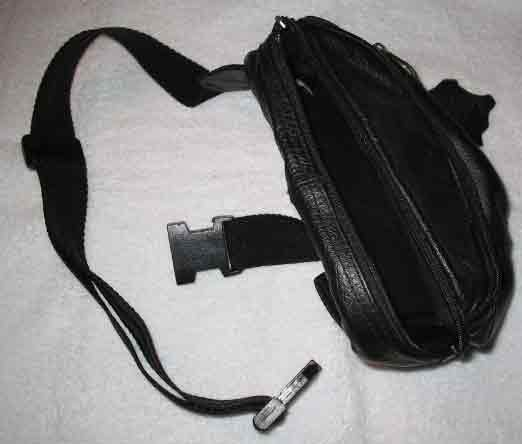
Artificial leather fanny pack with side-release belt buckle, belt slide for adjustment and top-open zipper compartment

A waist bag, fanny pack, belt bag, moon bag, belly bag (American English), or bumbag (British English) is a small fabric pouch worn like a belt around the waist by use of a strap above the hips that is secured usually with some sort of buckle. The straps sometimes have tri-glide slides, making them adjustable in order to fit properly. It can be considered as a purse worn around the waist.

Although traditionally the bag is worn with the pouch at the front, the separate American and British names derive from the fact that they are often worn with the pouch above the buttocks, for which "fanny" and "bum" are respective slang terms in each country. In France, they are known as banana bags, in Spain as riñoneras (coming from the Spanish word for kidney, riñón), in Poland as kidney bags, in Italy as the marsupio, from marsupium. In Costa Rica, they are called a skippy or canguru.

The modern bags resemble those used from antiquity in some cultures and have gone in and out of fashion from the second half of the 20th century. From the mid-2010s the bag is often worn crossbody.

== Early usage ==
Historically, the bag was positioned in front of the body, so people could protect themselves from bandits. Bags attached to belts have been in use since antiquity in many cultures. One origin was the Native American buffalo pouch which was used instead of sewing pockets into clothing. Buffalo pouches may also be worn on the wrist or carried on the front of the chest via a neck strap or lanyard. Ötzi had a belt pouch 5,000 years ago. The European medieval belt-pouch is another antecedent which was superseded as clothing came to have pockets. The Scottish sporran is a similar belted pouch that survived because of the impracticality of pockets in a kilt.

== Use ==
Mobile devices (and USB charging cables and backup batteries), bottles of water, snacks, tissue paper, first aid, isopropyl alcohol, contact lenses, and pepper spray are among some of the most common items stored in the bag. Fanny packs designed for concealed carry of a weapon are available.

Unlike handbags, they do not have to be carried, and unlike backpacks, they do not put undue strain on the back. Often referred to as "waist bags", they tend to be worn "cross body" rather than around the waist. Fashion houses such as Chanel and Gucci are at the forefront of the trend. The practicality of fanny packs is particularly popular in "festival fashion", where outfits tend to be more extravagant.

== Fashion ==
In 1954, a skiers leather fanny pack appeared in a Sports Illustrated Christmas shopping guide: "$10. The lightweight leather 'fanny pack' is designed to hold a cross-country skier's wax and lunch. It's also useful for cyclists, hikers, equestrians."

In 1962, reportedly, Melba Stone, an Australian widow, inspired by a kangaroo, is sometimes credited with making a fanny pack. "In 1988, Adweek named the fanny pack the product of the year."— i-D

The modern version made from nylon and other synthetic materials came into use in the 1980s and they were especially en vogue in the 1990s, but gradually their popularity fell into decline by the mid-2000s.

The fanny pack reemerged in 1983 when a gym owner in North Carolina had a friend create one for him, inspired by the man bag commonly worn by European men. He needed a convenient way to carry his wallet as the trend of wearing baggy pants was just starting to take off.

In 2012, calling them "belted satchels" or "hands-free bags", several designer labels sought to bring the accessory back by offering stylish and expensive designs selling for as much as $1,995.

In July 2018, The Boston Globe reported that fanny packs were back in vogue with new packs introduced by fashion designers Gucci, Prada, and Louis Vuitton. Designer packs retailed for up to $1,500 and were worn by celebrities such as Kim Kardashian, Rihanna, Jaden Smith, and Russell Westbrook. Vogue magazine reported on the trend by writing "Alas, due to our odd fascination with ugly throwback clothing, the fanny pack has been vindicated."

== Gallery ==
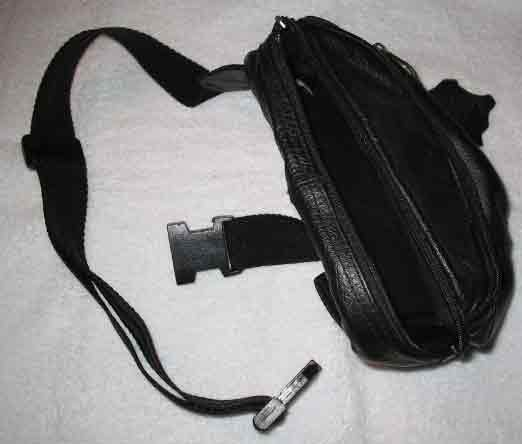
Artificial leather belt bag with side release buckle, tri-glide slide for adjustment and top-open zipper compartment

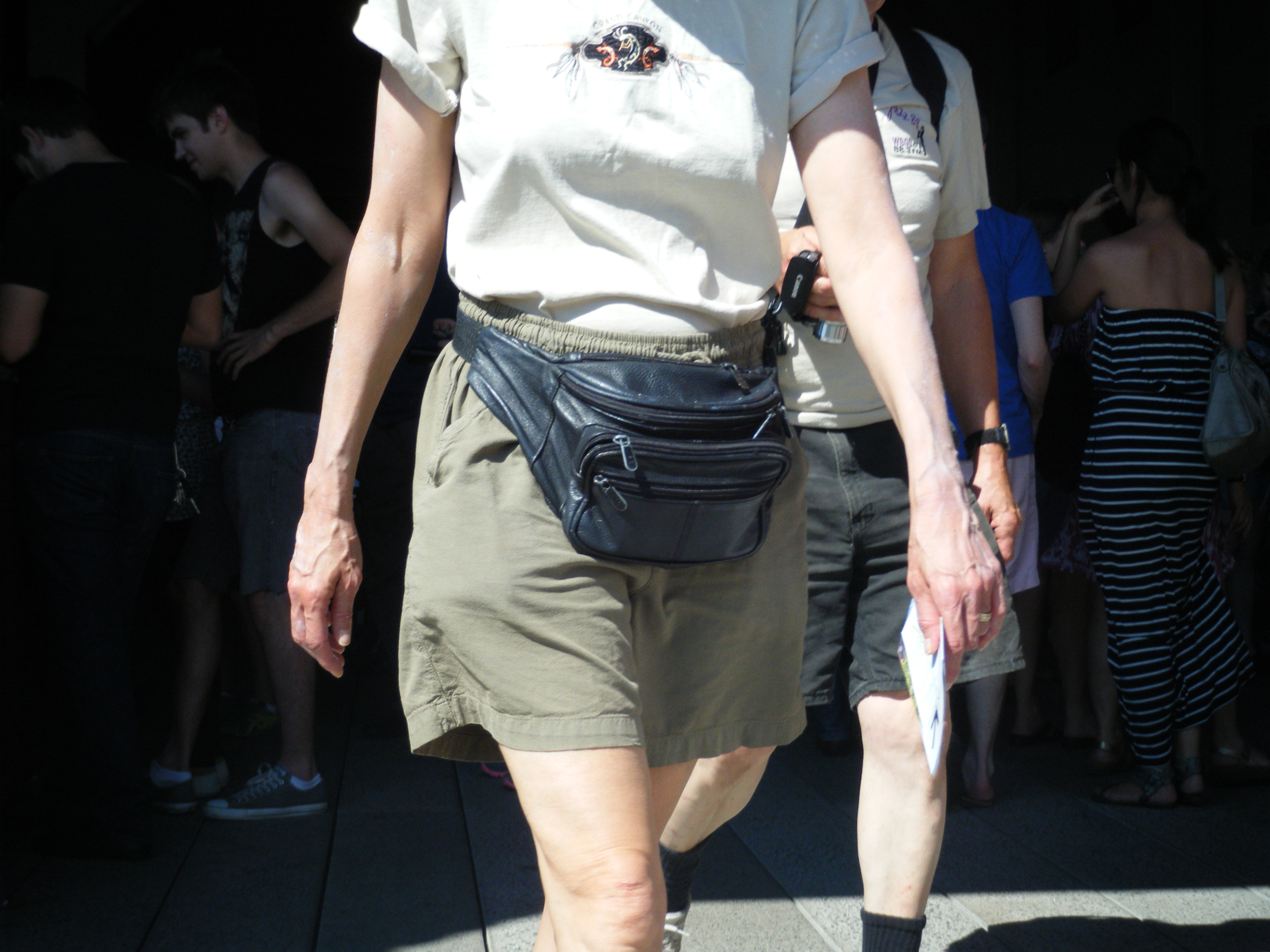
A woman wearing a leather fanny pack

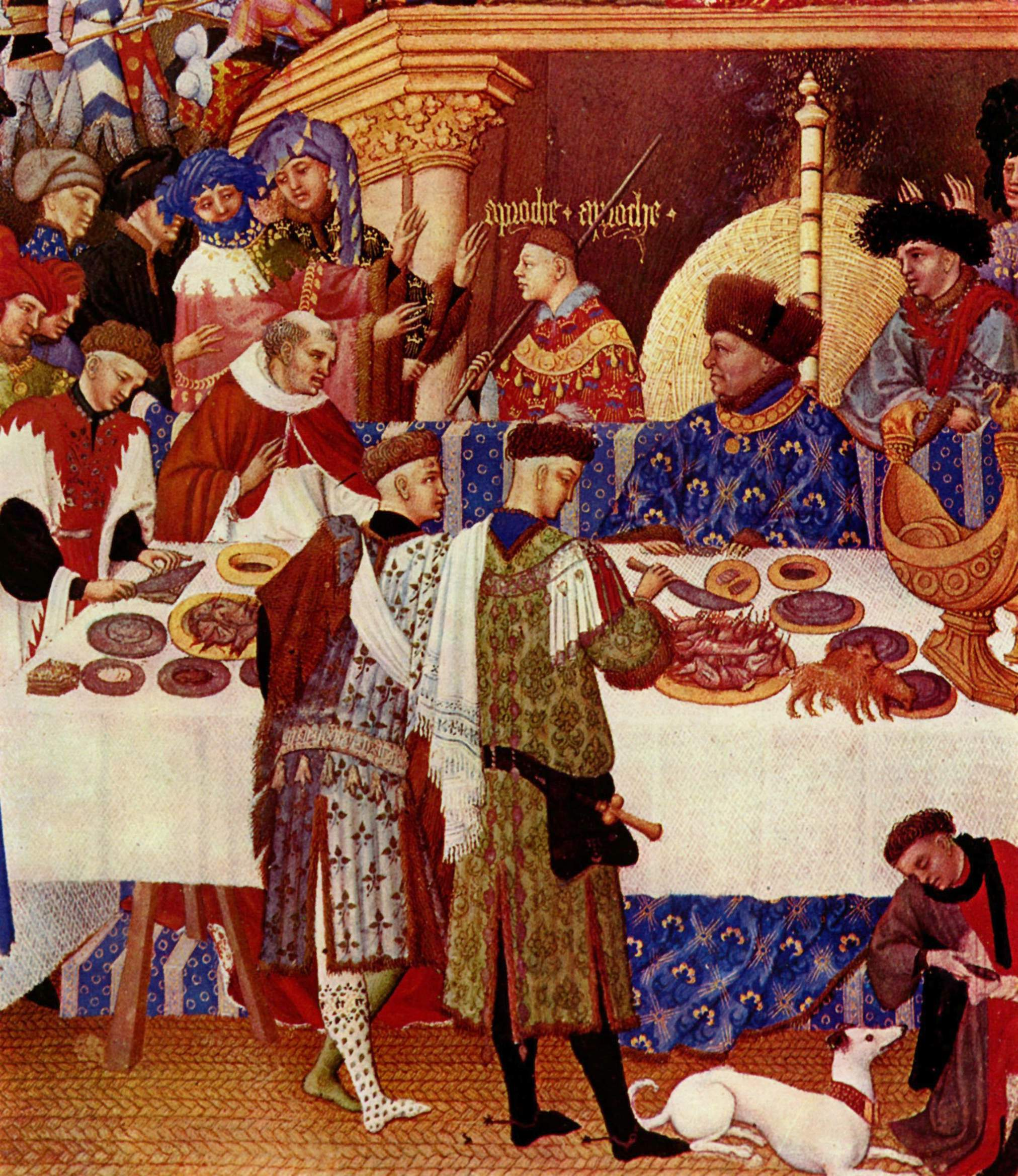
Medieval painting by the Limbourg brothers showing a lord wearing a belt bag with a bollock dagger, c. 1416

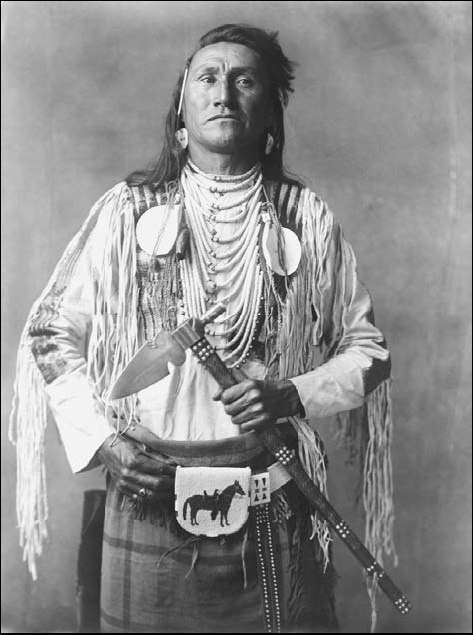
A nineteenth century photograph of a Plains Indian showing a belted bag known as a medicine pouch

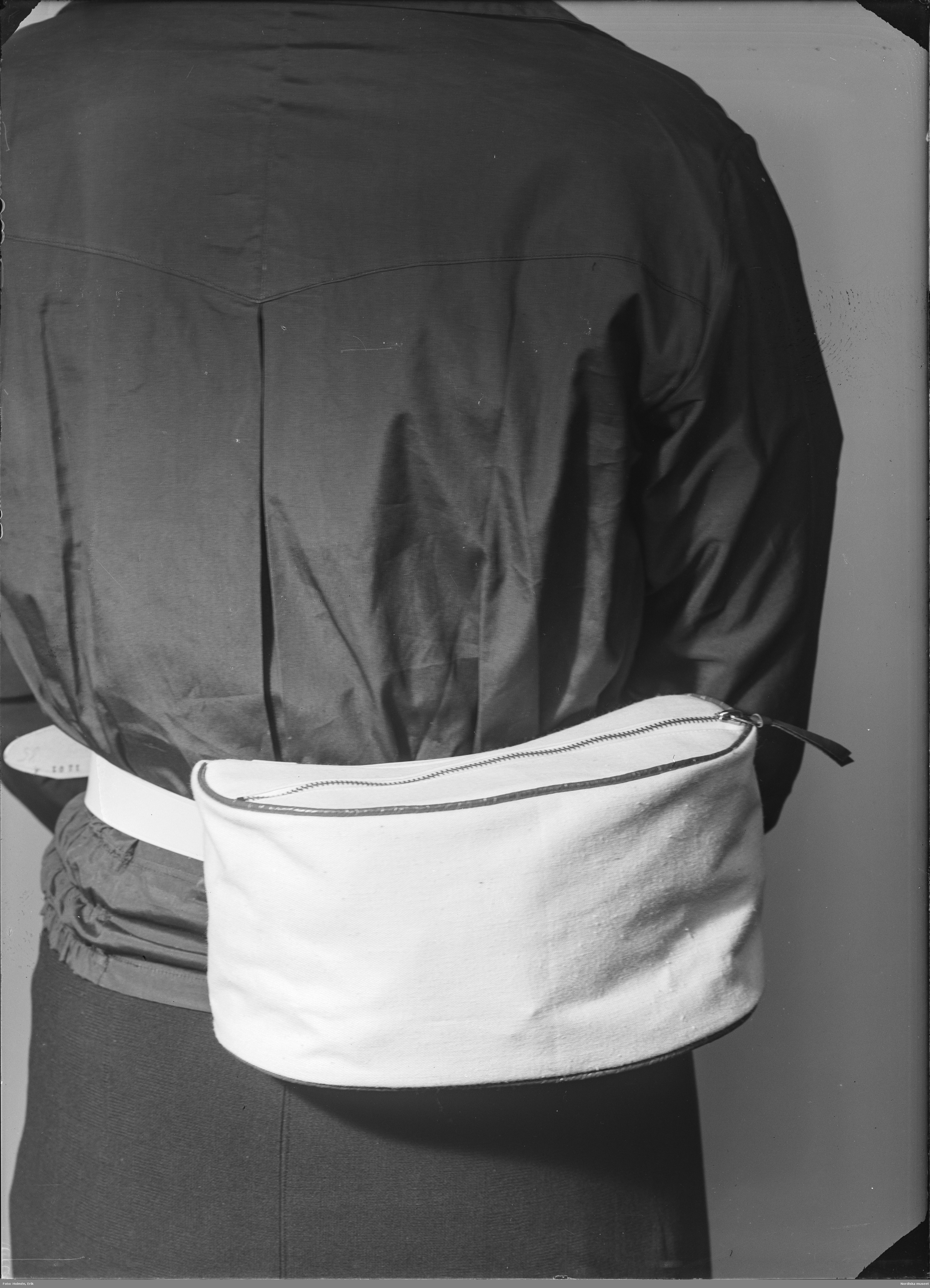
Fanny pack on a Swedish fashion photo, 1937

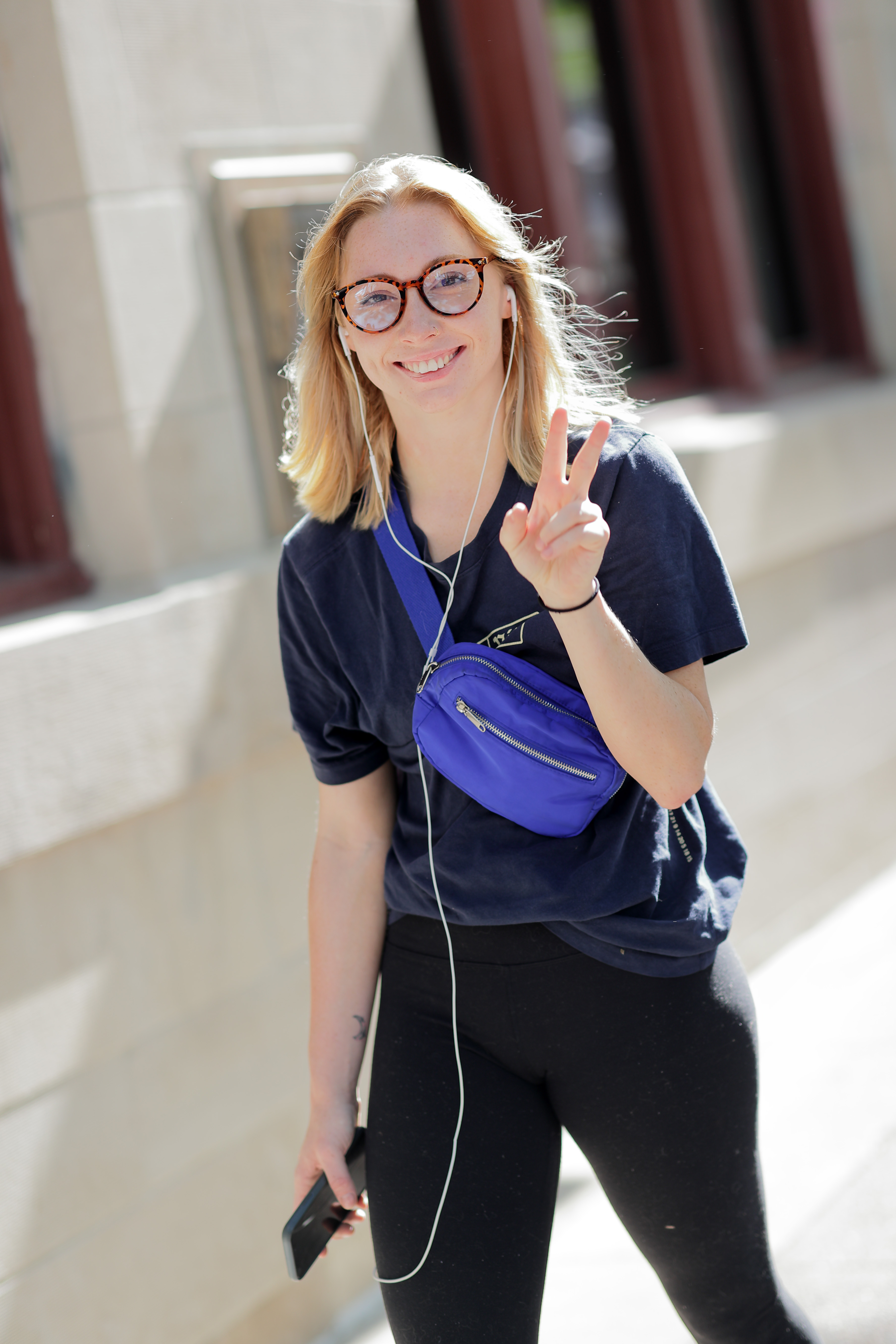
Fanny pack worn across the chest, 2022

== See also ==
- Money belt
- Messenger bag, a larger pouch than a fanny pack
- Utility belt
- Wristpack, essentially a fanny pack for the wrist
