= Baseball cap =

Type of soft, billed hat

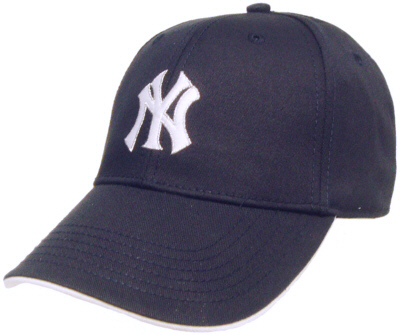
A New York Yankees baseball cap

A baseball cap is a type of soft hat with a rounded crown and a stiff bill projecting in front.

The front of the hat typically displays a design or a logo (historically, usually only a sports team, namely a baseball team, or names of relevant companies, when used as a commercial marketing technique). The hat may be "fitted" to the wearer's head or the back may have elastic, a plastic prong-in-a-hole (multiple holes with one prong that can be inserted), Velcro, a zipper, or a tri-glide slide so that it can be quickly adjusted to fit different wearers' heads. The baseball hat is a part of the traditional baseball uniform worn by players, with the brim pointing forward to shield the eyes from the sun. Since the 1980s, varieties of the hat have become prevalent in the United States and many other nations, both for utilitarian purposes (protecting the eyes from the sun) and as a fashion accessory.

== History ==
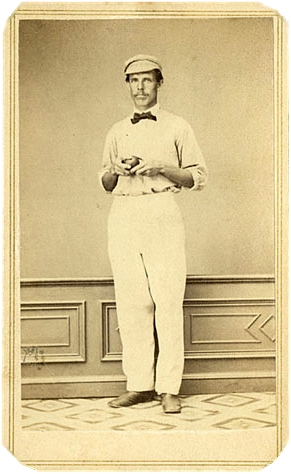
Baseball player Harry Wright wearing a cap, circa 1863

In 1860, the Brooklyn Excelsiors wore the precursor to the modern rounded-top baseball cap, which featured a long peak and a button on top, and by 1900, the "Brooklyn-style" cap had become popular. The merino cap topped with a star-like pattern was made by the New York sporting goods company Peck & Snyder.

In the late 1880s, a pillbox version of the cap became popular and would later morph into the modern six-paneled round cap; five teams revived the pillbox form in 1976 in celebration of the US Bicentennial. Team monograms first appeared in 1894 when the Boston Baseball Club (the Boston Braves) — now the Atlanta Braves — became the first team to wear letterforms when they added a monogram-style device to their caps, followed by three more teams in the next season. The Detroit Tigers of 1901 were the first major league team to have a mascot — a red tiger on a dark background — on their ballcap. It was replaced by the letter "D" in 1903, and their iconic blackletter letterform appeared a year later.

During the 1940s, latex rubber became the stiffening material inside the hat, and the modern baseball cap was born. The peak, also known in certain areas as the bill or brim, was designed to protect a player's eyes from the sun. The basic shape of modern baseball hats, with a curved peak, is similar to some 19th-century sunbonnet styles. Typically, the peak was much shorter in the earlier days of the baseball hat. Also, the hat has become more structured, versus the overall "floppy" cap of the 19th and early 20th centuries. The baseball cap was and still is an important means by which to identify a team. Often, the logo, mascot, team's, city's, or country's initials were placed on the cap. Usually, the cap was also fashioned in the official colors of a particular team.

Since 1993, the New Era Cap Company of Buffalo, N.Y. has been the exclusive baseball cap supplier for Major League Baseball.

== Design ==
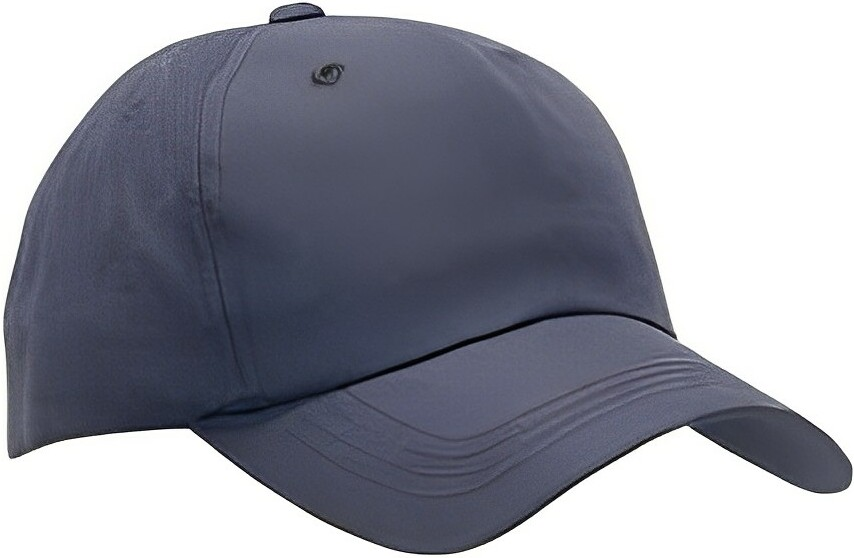
A simple baseball cap

Fitted baseball hats — those without an adjuster — are normally sewn in six sections, and may be topped with a matching fabric-covered button (also called a squatchee) on the crown. Metal grommets or fabric eyelets are often sewn or attached near the top of each of the six fabric sections to provide ventilation. In some cases, the rear sections of the crown are made of net-like mesh material for extra ventilation. The peak is typically stiffened by a sewn-in piece of paperboard or stiff plastic.

=== Variations ===
Baseball hats are made from many materials and come in various styles for different purposes. Major and minor league baseball players wear classic-style hats made of wool (or more recently, polyester) with their team's simple logo and colors; the logo is usually embroidered into the fabric. More recently, some brands are using uncommon materials for snapback hats, such as wood brims.

Formerly, baseball hats only came in standard hat sizes. Since the early 1970s, they have also been available in a one-size-fits-all form, with an adjustment strap in the back. The style, commonly called snapback, has become increasingly popular as a fashion accessory, as have team caps, popularized especially by rap and hip-hop musicians. Advances in textiles have led to the "stretch-fit" hat, which uses Lycra or rubber to allow a hat to have a fitted style while still being "adjustable" within sizes.

The front may be soft or stiffened with buckram to display a logo more clearly.

Another version of the baseball hat is a plastic mesh hat with a foam front imprinted with a company logo. This style is sometimes called a trucker hat or a "gimme hat" because it is given away for free as a promotional item.

There are 4 major types of baseball hats:

1. Snapback hat – (hat with a snap closure in the rear) with flat brim, high profile, adjustable.
2. Adjustable hat – (hat with a velcro closure or buckled strap in the rear) unstructured, low profile, curved brim, adjustable.
3. Stretchable hat – curved or flat brim, structured cap, high profile, adjustable by the use of elastic materials.
4. Fitted hat – curved or flat brim, structured cap, high profile, unadjustable.
Baseball cap styles and variations

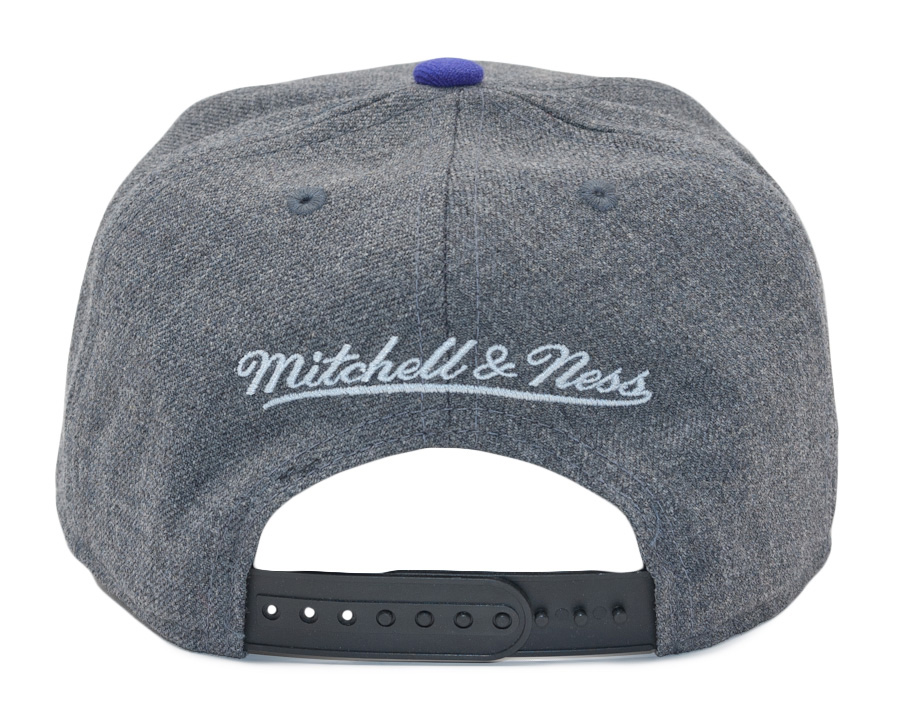
Snapback baseball cap

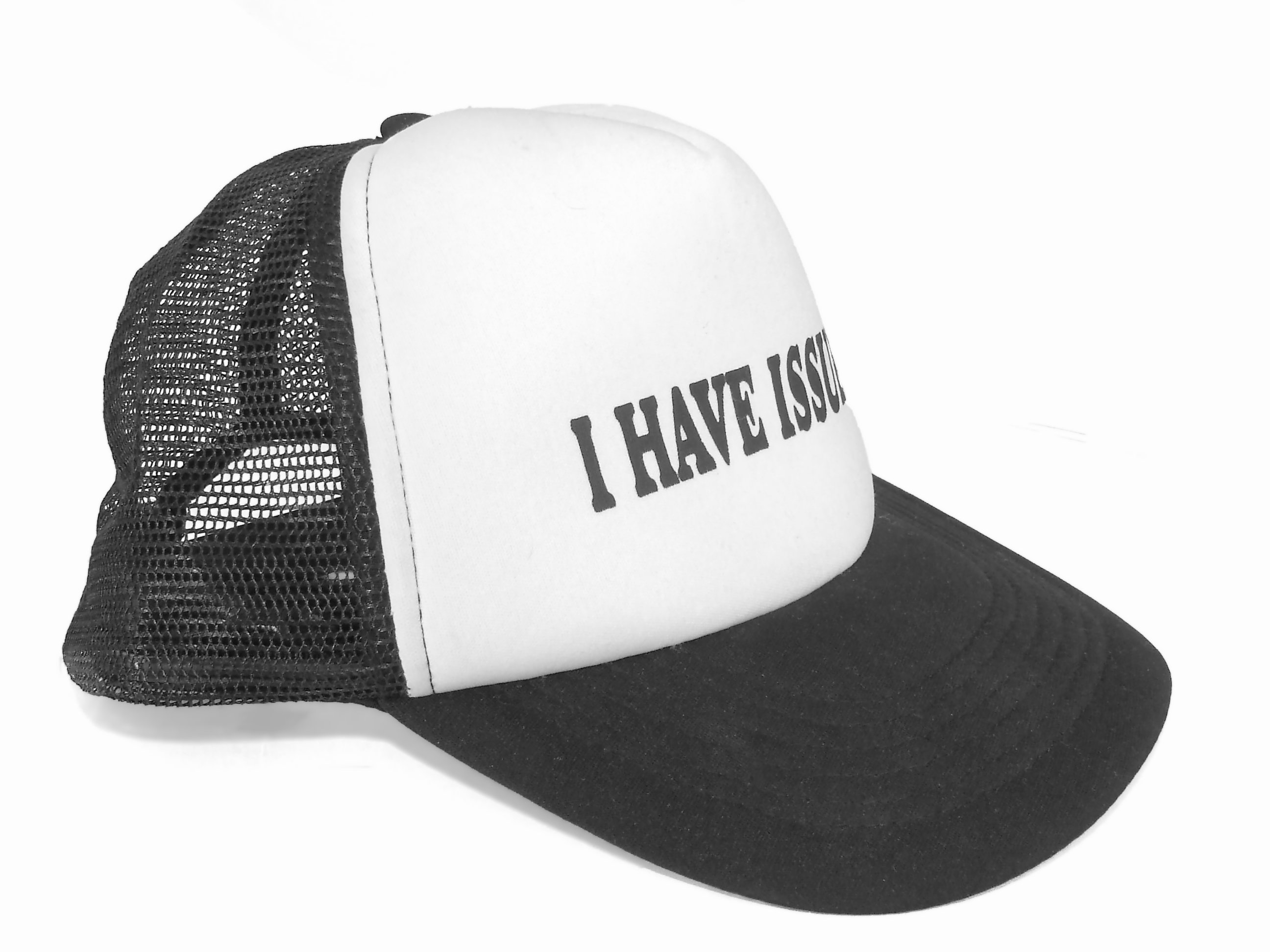
Trucker cap

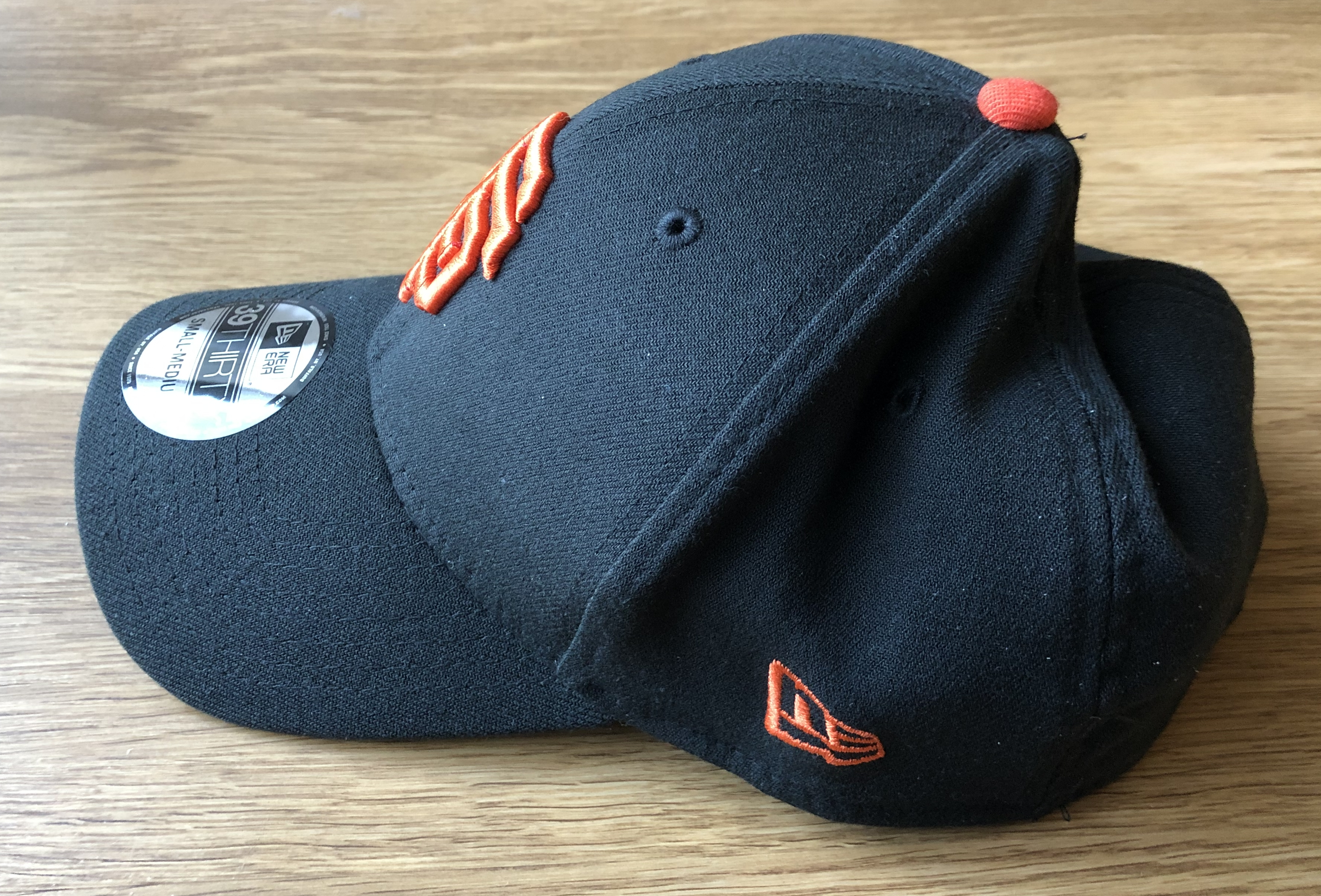
Stretchable baseball cap with the San Francisco Giants logo

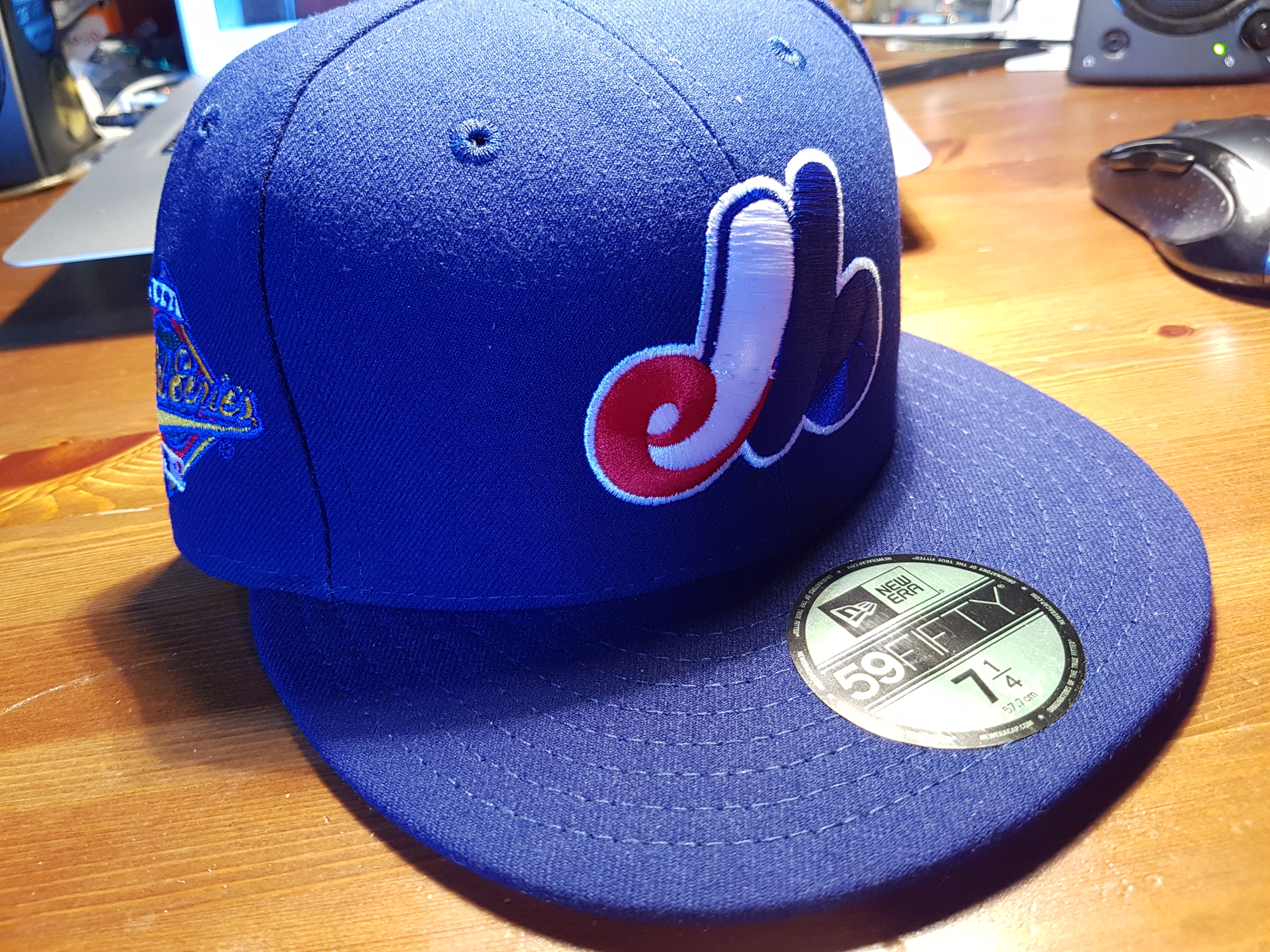
Fitted baseball cap with the Montreal Expos logo

== Athletic use ==
=== In baseball ===
In the sport of baseball, the cap is an important part of the uniform, which, in addition to its protective function, identifies a team. Often, the logo, mascot, team's, city's, or country's initials (often in the form of a monogram) are placed on the cap.

In 2007, the MLB changed the standard cap worn by players from wool to polyester to increase player comfort.

In 2014, the MLB began allowing pitchers to wear a special reinforced hat to protect their heads from line drives.

=== In other sports ===
Baseball caps are also used on and off the field in other sports. In softball baseball caps are mandatory for men but optional for women. In limited overs cricket teams have opted to wear baseball caps, rather than more traditional cricket caps. In golf and tennis, baseball caps are used as an alternative to more traditional headgear.

Athletes in other sports wear hats with their team's logo and colors as "sideline" hats; both types are also sold as authentic team merchandise in retail stores. Other hats may simply have a maker's logo, such as Reebok, Nike, or Carhartt; these hats are often made of brushed cotton.

In many forms of motorsport, a baseball cap with the logo of the series' tire supplier will be given to the top 3 finishing drivers to wear during the podium ceremony.

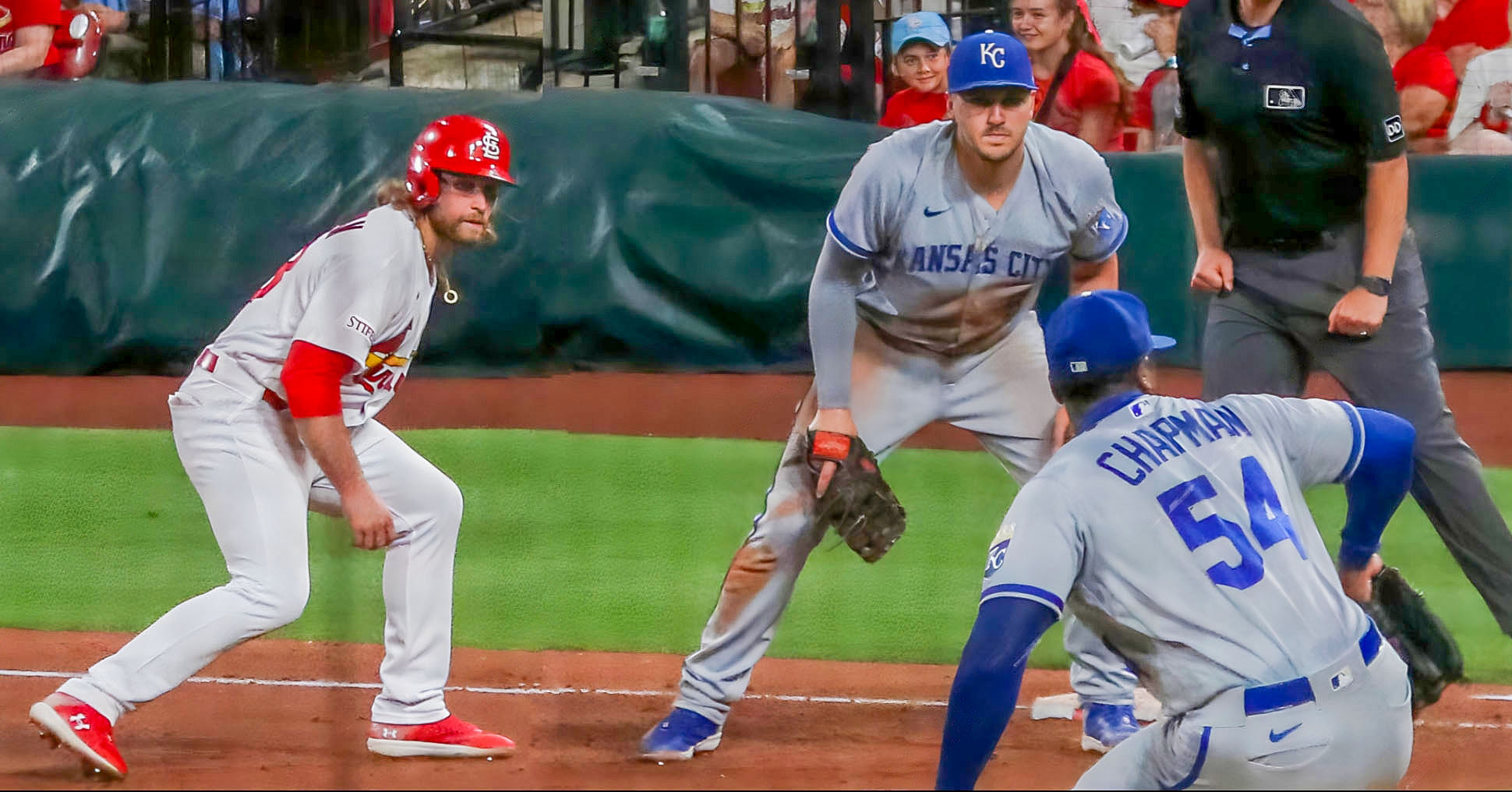
Baseball players wearing caps; the player in red wears a batting helmet

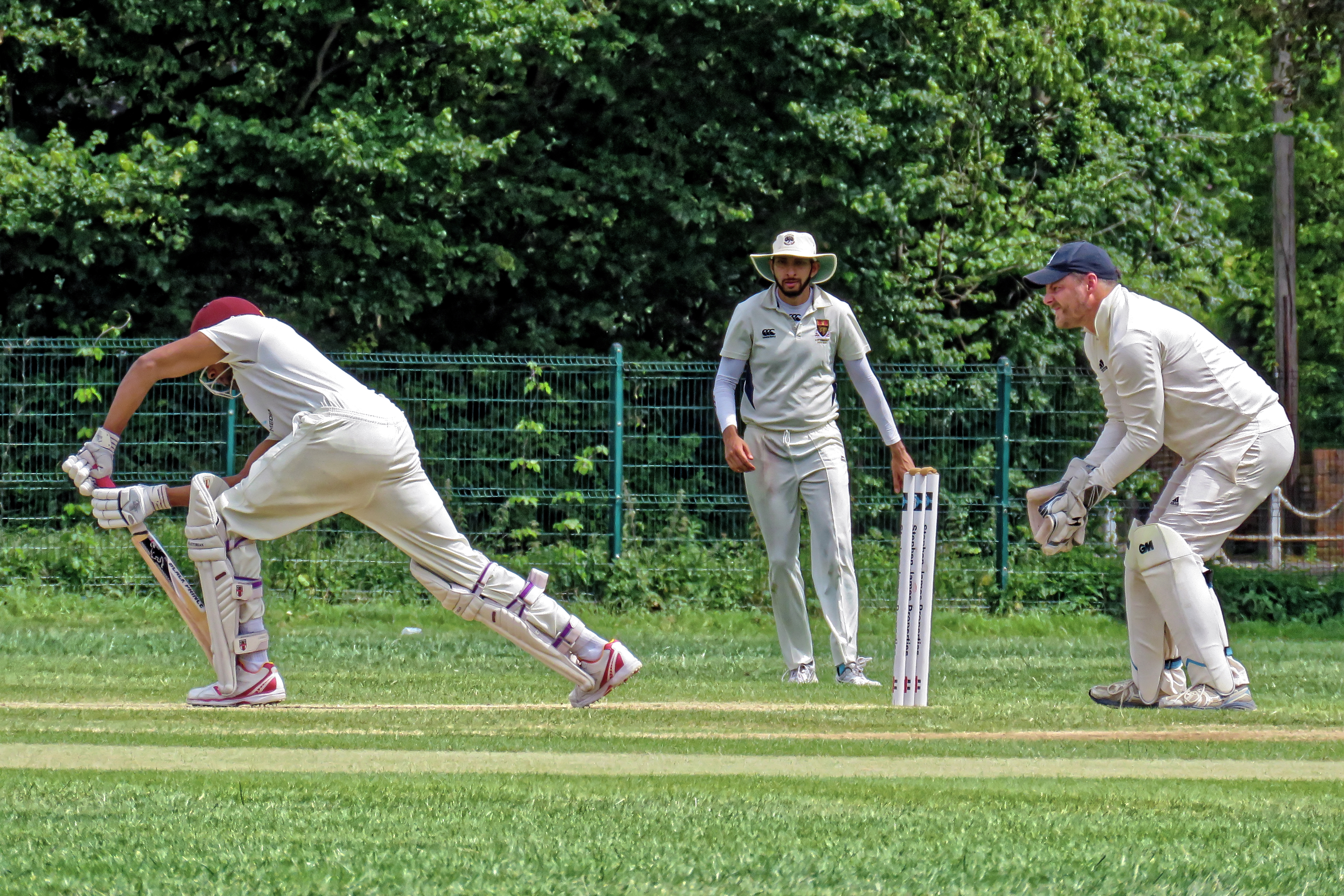
Cricket: wicket-keeper with baseball cap

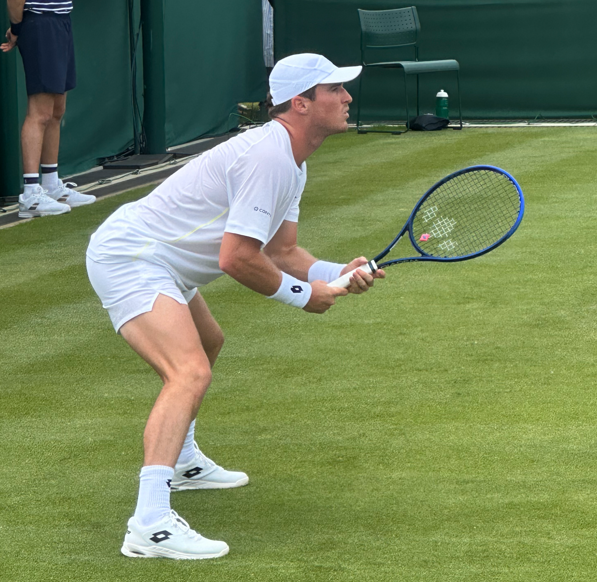
Tennis player with baseball cap

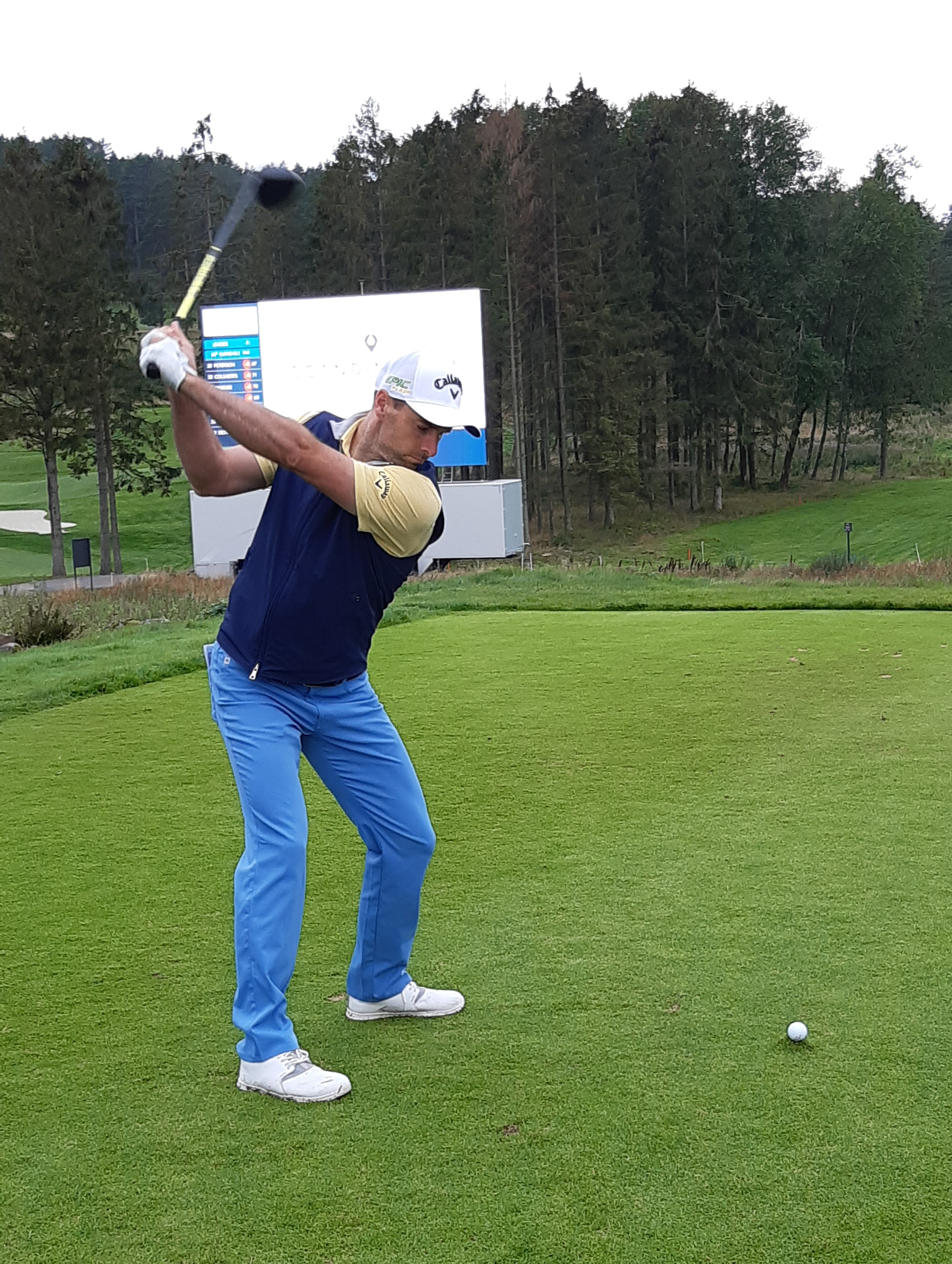
Golfer with baseball cap

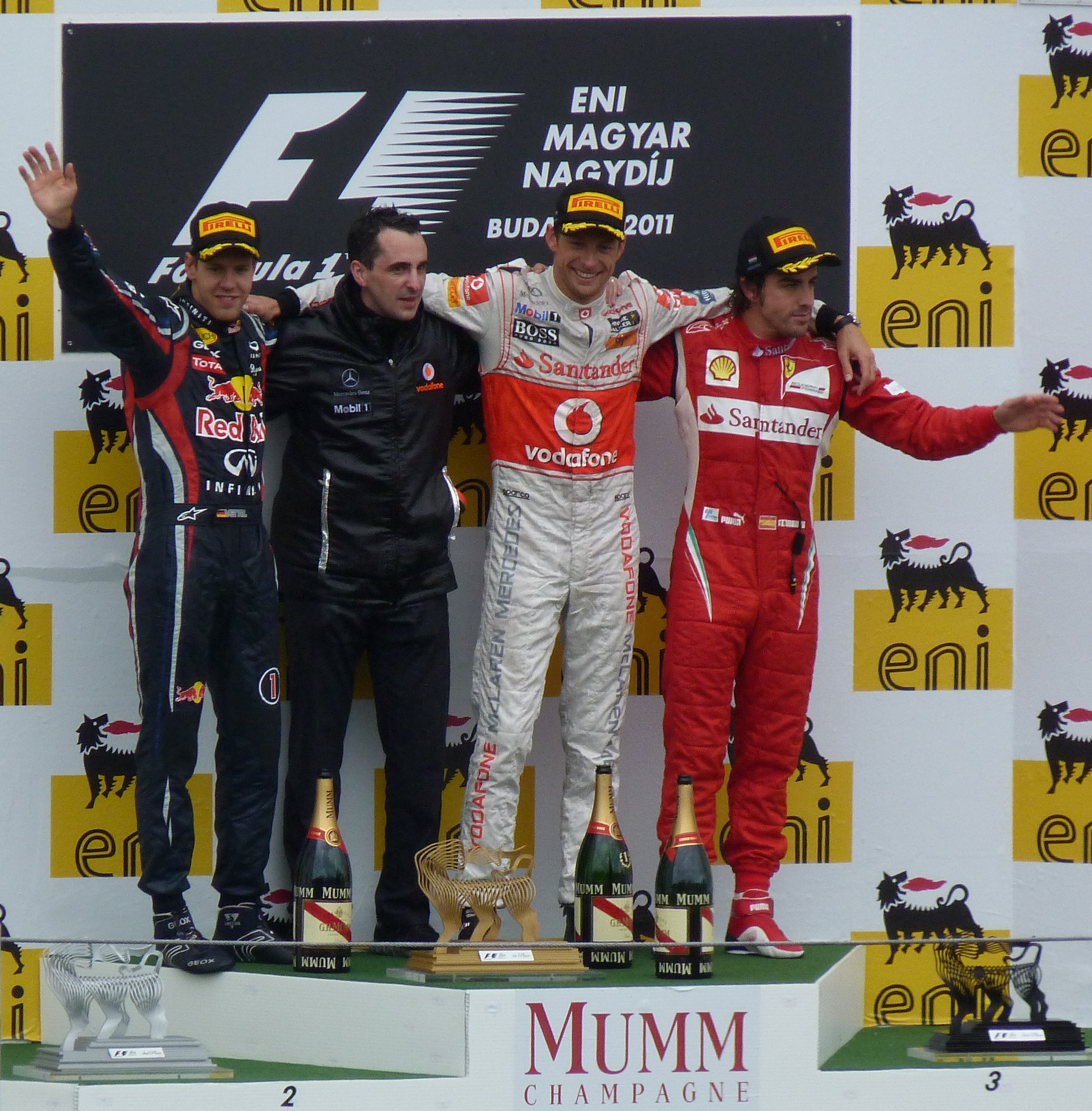
Pirelli Podium Caps worn by drivers at the 2011 Hungarian Grand Prix

== Professional use ==
=== Military ===
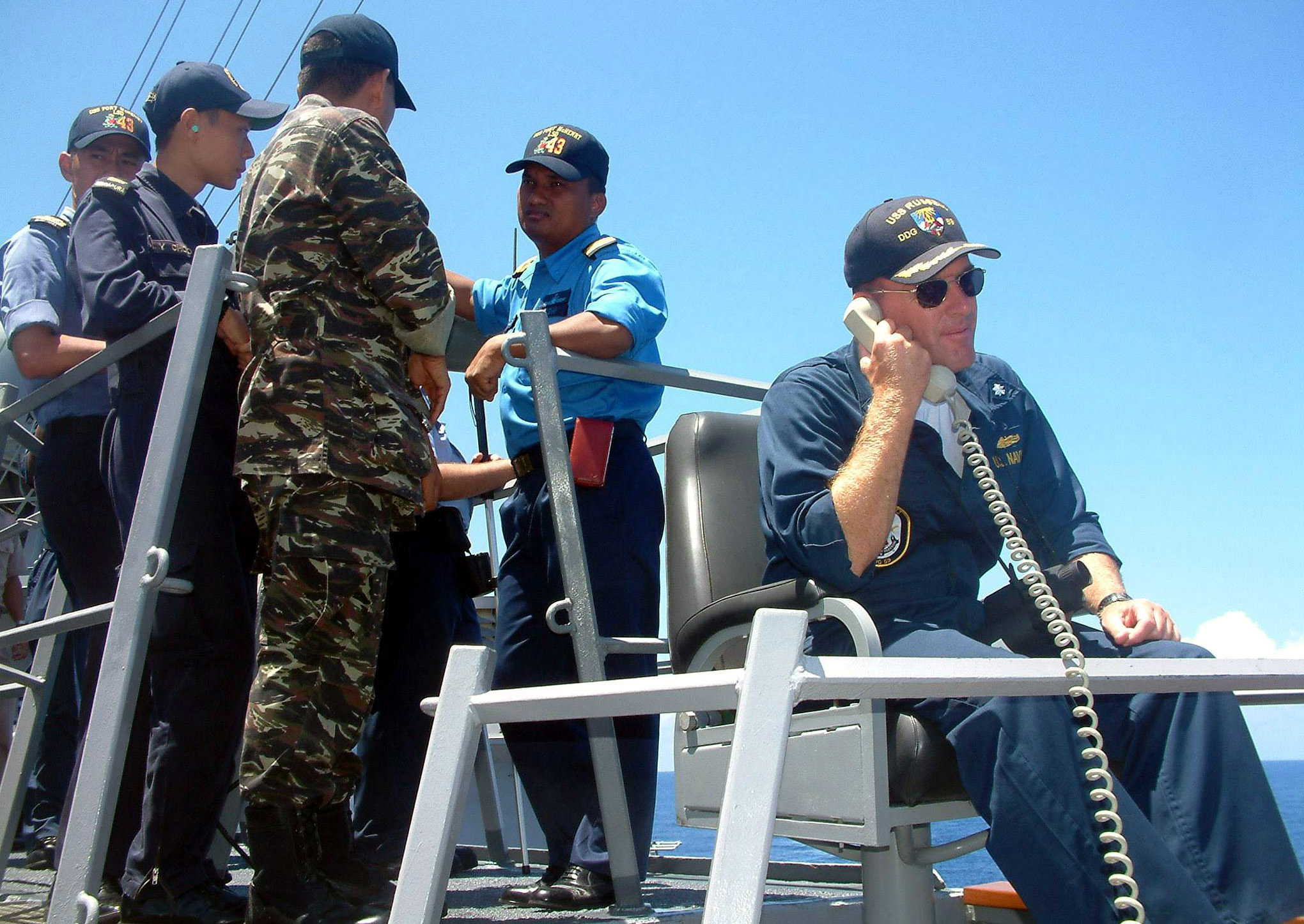
Baseball caps worn by naval officers from the US, Singapore, Thailand, Brunei, Indonesia, Malaysia, and the Philippines

Although the patrol cap is common in the United States Armed Forces, some units use baseball caps as part of their uniforms, usually with combat uniforms. They sometimes have a command logo on the front to denote command affiliation. Alternatively, the cap may have the wearer's rank on the front if the wearer is an officer. Baseball caps of a particular color are worn to denote a specific function of a person or a particular job. For example, in the United States submarine force, red baseball caps are worn by drill monitors who facilitate and critique members of the boat's crew during drills. In the United States Army, parachute riggers wear red baseball caps, and parachute instructors wear black baseball caps as part of their uniform. In various squadrons of the United States Air Force's civilian auxiliary, squadron-distinctive baseball caps have been issued as headgear (or "cover") for the Battle Dress Uniform, typically displaying squadron colors, squadron number, and/or squadron patch. Although the BDUs have their own cover, a patrol cap in M81 Woodland pattern, some squadrons have opted for more distinctive covers.

=== Police ===
There has been a marked trend in recent years among police forces worldwide to replace peaked caps and other traditional headdresses with inexpensive, comfortable baseball caps. The baseball cap is already commonly used by private security companies as a low-cost, practical piece of uniform headgear. Particularly heavily armed police units around the world, including SWAT in the United States and the Metropolitan Police Specialist Firearms Command in the UK, often wear baseball caps to shield their eyes from the sun, where a full helmet would be excessive.

==== Armenia ====
In Armenia, local service police officers have worn baseball caps as part of their uniform (previously peaked caps) since the April 2003 decree.

==== Finland ====
The Finnish Police uses a baseball cap, which has mostly replaced the traditional side cap. It is marked with the police emblem and "Police" in Finnish and Swedish.

==== Serbia ====
Since its adoption in 2013, the Serbian Police wear a baseball cap as part of their service uniform.

==== Slovenia ====
In Slovenia, police officers on motorcycles wear baseball caps as part of their uniform when they are not wearing their helmets.

==== Spain ====
- The Civil Guard switched from Teresiana caps (a Spanish military cap similar to a Kepi) to baseball caps during 2011 to 2012 (The historic Tricorne has been retained only for Galas and Representation wear).
- The National Police uses a baseball cap, which has mostly replaced the peaked caps with effect from 2009 (except for Galas and Representation).
- The Local Police uses a baseball cap, which has mostly replaced the peaked caps in 2007-2008 (except for Galas).
- In Basque Country, the Ertzaintza uses a baseball cap, which has mostly replaced the Berets in 2010 (except for Galas and Representation purposes).
- In Navarre, The Chartered Police of Navarre uses a baseball cap, which has mostly replaced the Berets in 2012 (except for Galas and Representation).
- In Catalonia, The Mossos d'Esquadra uses a baseball cap, which has replaced the Peaked caps in 2023, after 40 years in use.

==== United Kingdom ====
In the United Kingdom, several police forces have adopted the baseball cap as a unisex alternative to the traditionally worn custodian helmets for male officers and bowler hats for female officers. However, the Northamptonshire force announced in November 2018 that their "Bump Caps" had proven unpopular and would be withdrawn from use.

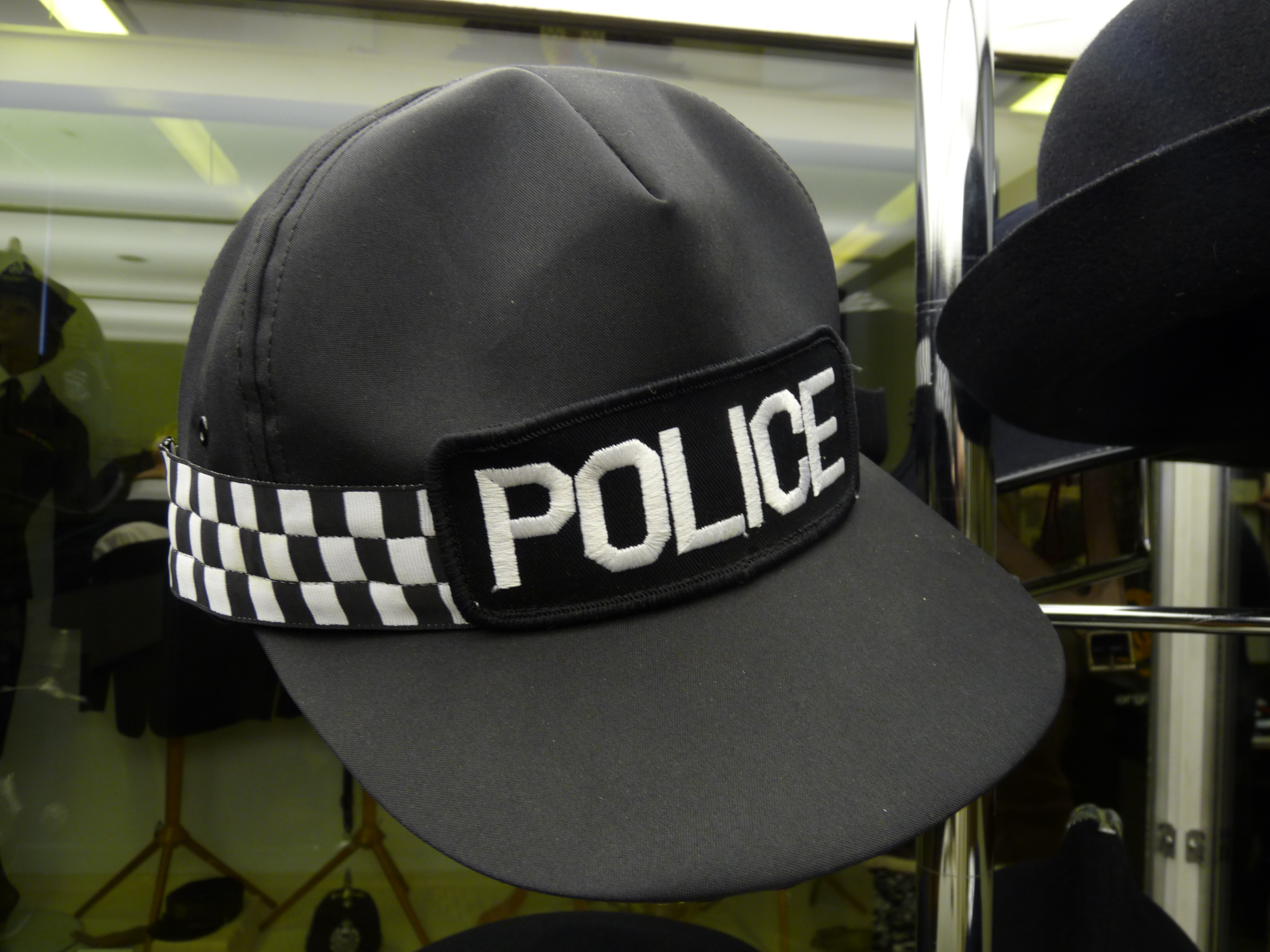
A typical British police baseball cap on display at the West Midlands Police Museum in Sparkhill Police Station, Birmingham, England

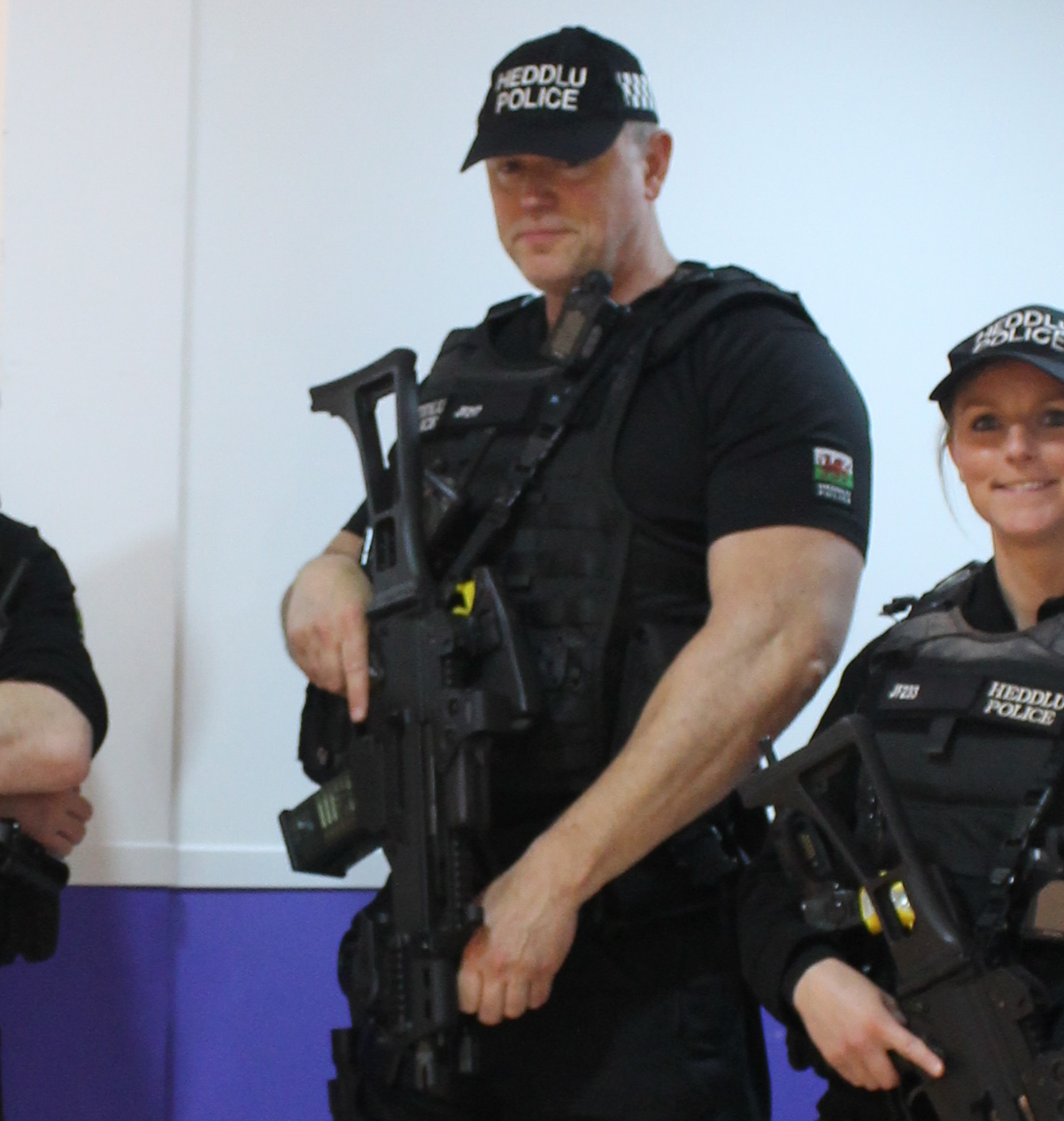
Baseball caps of North Wales Police displaying the word POLICE in English and Welsh

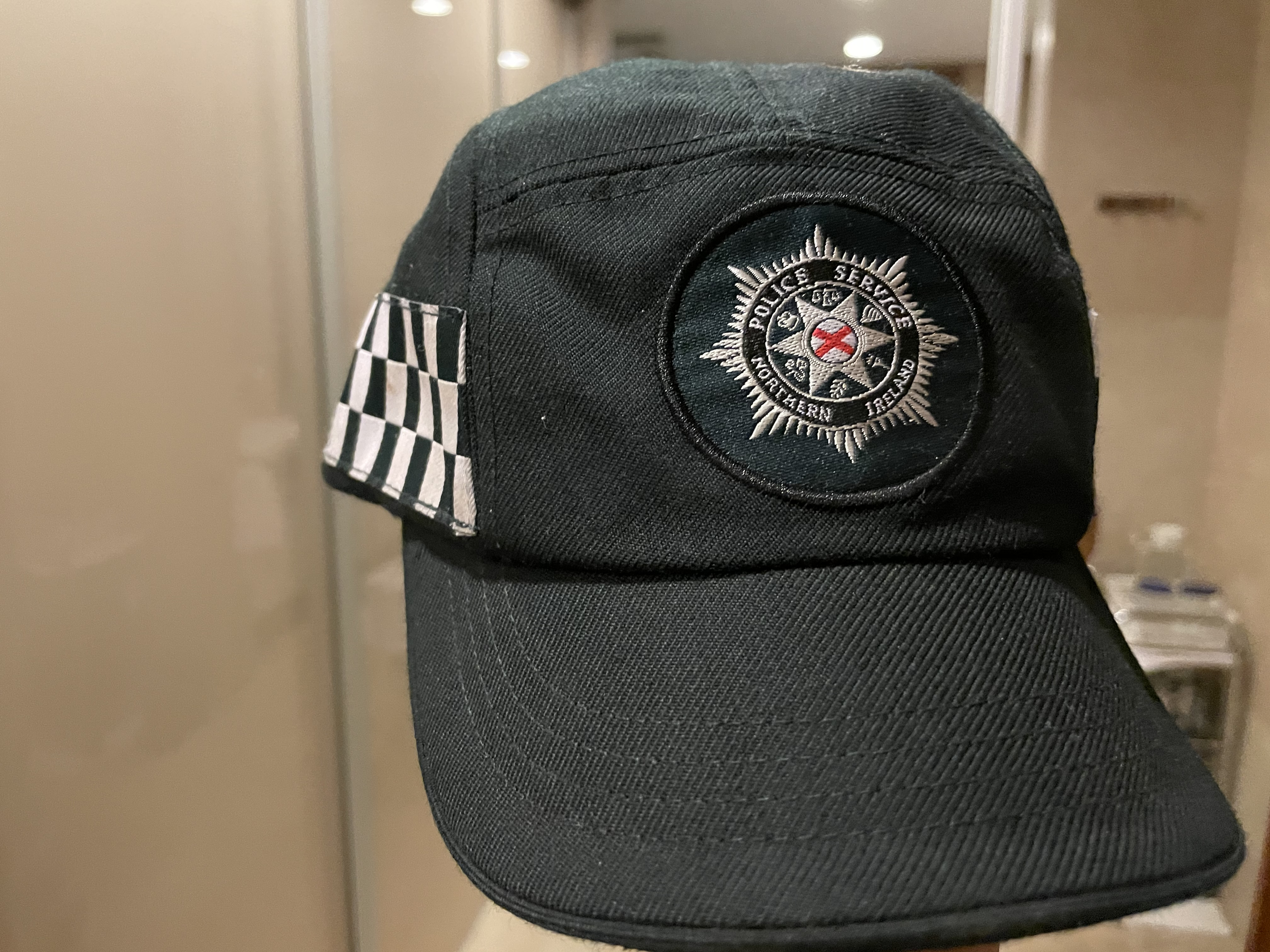
A dark green cap of the Police Service of Northern Ireland

==== United States ====
In many United States police forces, the baseball cap is worn as a more practical alternative to the traditional peaked cap or campaign hat, the latter of which is generally used by Sheriff's offices and state police forces. Baseball caps are more common on the West Coast, whereas in eastern states, the traditional peaked cap is more prominent. A notable exception is the San Francisco Police Department, where peaked caps are still worn regularly.

== Casual use ==
Baseball games were first televised in the 1960s, prompting fans and viewers to seek baseball caps of their own to show their support for a given team. Agriculture companies quickly began to create promotional caps with their own branding, and these trucker hats rose in popularity over the following two decades.

In 1980, New Era began to sell souvenir baseball caps with team branding for fans, rather than athletes. Throughout the decade, baseball caps could be seen in fashion magazines like Vogue (which helped to popularize their gender neutrality), on lead actors in television shows like Magnum, P.I. and MacGyver, and on hip-hop and rap artists like Chuck D of Public Enemy and Eazy-E of N.W.A. Professor Jabari Miles Evans of the University of South Carolina highlighted this moment in history as a transition from the baseball cap's primary association with sports fandom and city of origin to an association with coolness and style.

Baseball player Ken Griffey Jr. has been credited by GQ as first popularizing the backwards fitted cap, although its rise through the 1990s is attributed to Fred Durst of Limp Bizkit, whose visibility on MTV brought the style to the foreground. By the 2010s, snapbacks had overtaken the backwards fitted cap in prominence, especially among rappers like Jay-Z and Big Sean.

The "dad hat", a less structured baseball cap with a curved brim, originated in the 1990s when brands like '47 noticed consumers distressing more structured hats to create a broken-in look and feel, and began to replicate this outcome in manufacturing. This style climbed in popularity, reaching both celebrities and mainstream wear by the mid 2010s and through the mid 2020s.

== See also ==
- Baseball clothing and equipment
- Baseball uniform
- Beanie (seamed cap)
- Cap (sport)
- Cricket cap, a similar cap in a similar sport
- Flat cap
- Kepi
- List of hat styles
- List of headgear
- Trucker hat
