= Webbed belt =

Belt made of webbing

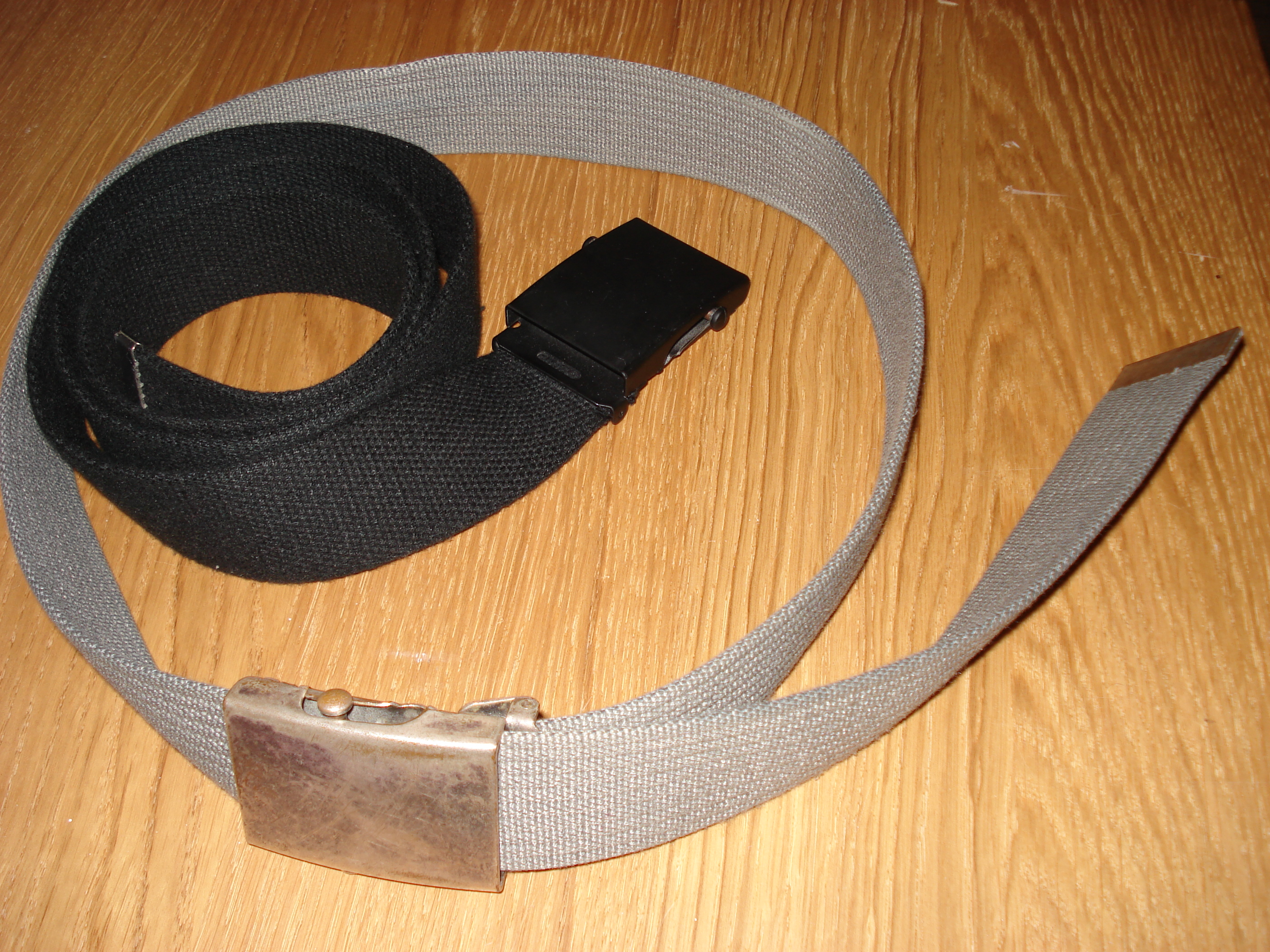
Two webbed belts, one fastened.

A webbed belt, military belt, roll pin belt or skater belt is a type of belt, normally made of webbing, distinguished by its belt buckle design and lack of holes in the cord, which is usually found in other belts where a pin is used as the fastening mechanism in the belt buckle. A belt of this type is often used in the uniforms of armed forces as well as that of the Girl Scouts of the USA and Boy Scouts of America, since it is adjustable, cheap to produce and does not deteriorate easily.

Webbed belts began to be used in more casual fashion beginning in the 1960s.

== Design ==
1. / When the belt (blue) moves to the right, the pin (pink) disengages and the belt moves freely.; 2. / When the belt moves to the left, the pin resists further motion.

The design of the belt buckle is usually a hollow metal rectangular box through which the cloth cord passes through, when fastened, a pin with the length equal to the width of the cord is pushed up from a groove and stops the cloth by increasing the amount of friction needed to pull the cloth cord further through the box. This mechanism removes the need for holes in the cord, which is a common feature on many other designs, it also allows the wearer to adjust the belt to the exact size needed, as it is not limited by the holes.
