= Tri-glide slide =

Strap adjustment

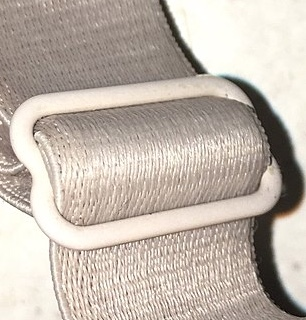
A cream-colored metal slide along with strap

A tri-glide slide, also called a webbing slide, is a small item of hardware made of plastic or metal (usually electroplated) forming a rectangle with a bar in the middle — there are thus two separate openings. They are utilized when webbing is slid through one and then out of the other opening, for the purpose of the strap being effectively shortened or lengthened to an extent. As everyone varies in size, they are often used on objects that are worn, such as pet harnesses, bras, belt bags, diving masks, personal flotation jackets, caps, gun slings, etc., so that these objects can be adjusted to not fit the wearer too constrictedly or loosely, but comfortably while still tight enough. They are made in different dimensions because of varying strap width and thickness.
