= Belt buckle =

Fastener for a belt

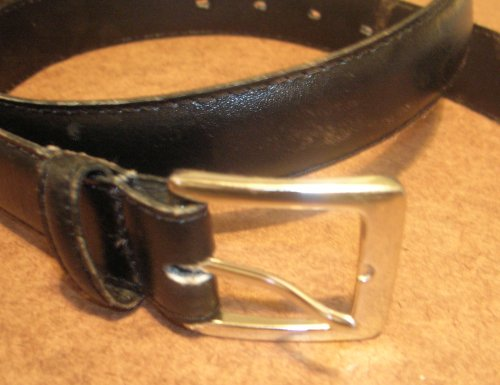
Frame-style buckle: A conventional belt buckle with single square frame and prong

A belt buckle is a buckle, a clasp for fastening two ends, such as of straps or a belt, in which a device attached to one of the ends is fitted or coupled to the other. The word enters Middle English via Old French and the Latin buccula or "cheek-strap", as for a helmet. Belt buckles and other fixtures are used on a variety of belts, including cingula, baltea, baldrics and later waist-belts.

== Types ==
Belt buckles go back at least to the Iron Age and a gold "great buckle" was among the items interred at Sutton Hoo. Primarily decorative "shield on tongue" buckles were common Anglo-Saxon grave goods at this time, elaborately decorated on the "shield" portion and associated only with men. One such buckle, found in a 7th-century grave at Finglesham, Kent during excavations by Sonia Chadwick Hawkes in 1964 bears the image of a naked warrior standing between two spears wearing only a horned helmet and belt.

Frame-style buckles are the oldest design. In a frame-and-prong buckle the prong attaches to one end of the frame and extends "away" from the wearer through a hole in the belt, where it anchors against the opposite side of the frame. The oldest styles have a simple loop or D-shaped frame (see: D-ring), but "double-loop" or "center post" buckles whose prongs attach to a fixed center section appear in the 8th century. Very small buckles with removable center pins and chapes were introduced and used on shoes, beginning in the 17th century, but not often for waist-belts. A "chape" is the fixed cover or plate which attaches buckle to belt while the "mordant" or "bite" is the adjustable portion.

Plate-style buckles are common on western military belts of the mid-19th century, which often feature a three-hook clasp: two hooks fitting into one end of the belt and a third into the other. Officers might have a similar but more intricate clasp-style closure that featured two interlocking metal parts. In practice, the term "belt plate" refers to any flat, decorated surface on such a clasp. These precede development of modern "western-style" buckles, which feature a hinged frame affixed to one end of the belt and a simple hook clasp which enters the belt hole toward the wearer but leaves most of the buckle on the "outside" of the belt, providing an ample surface for decoration. The distance between the fixed frame or chape of a plate buckle and its adjustment prong is called the "throw".

Box-frame buckles are a 20th-century style of military friction buckle, common on webbed belts. The box-frame buckle consists of three parts (front, back and post). An adjustable captive post sits perpendicular to the belt to press it against the outer "box", which completely surround the webbing and minimize accidental adjustments should part of the belt snag on something. There may or may not be a metal tip on the opposite "tongue" end of the belt for easier insertion.

O-Ring/D-Ring buckles use one or two rings to form the buckle. The belt is fastened by threading through the ring(s). This is used with braided, webbing, and canvas belts.

Quick-release buckles are found in various forms and are typically used on webbing equipment.

Knurled bar/Roll-pin buckles are used on cargo securing straps and can adjust to any length.

Snap/Side release buckles use male and female ends to snap together. They are more functional and often used for outdoor activities.

Earlier, military-style buckles often use friction and are designed for use with cloth belts or straps. Simple friction buckles are one-piece frames with no prong whatsoever, the strap or belt winding through a series of slots, and may more technically be called "belt slides" or "belt trims". A popular example is the roll-pin buckle used by British Paratroopers, who used straps from leftover RAF air-dropped cargo packs, made excellent replacements to the then standard issue 58 pattern belt that often shrunk when they became wet. This trend originated in the Malayan Emergency, when the roll-pin buckle could be easily adjusted which is important on long patrols when the users could lose weight due to exertion, inadequate nutrition, and disease etc.

Although technically not buckles, other fasteners such as plastic "side-clasp" or even seat belt latches are also often used on belts, and colloquially called buckles.

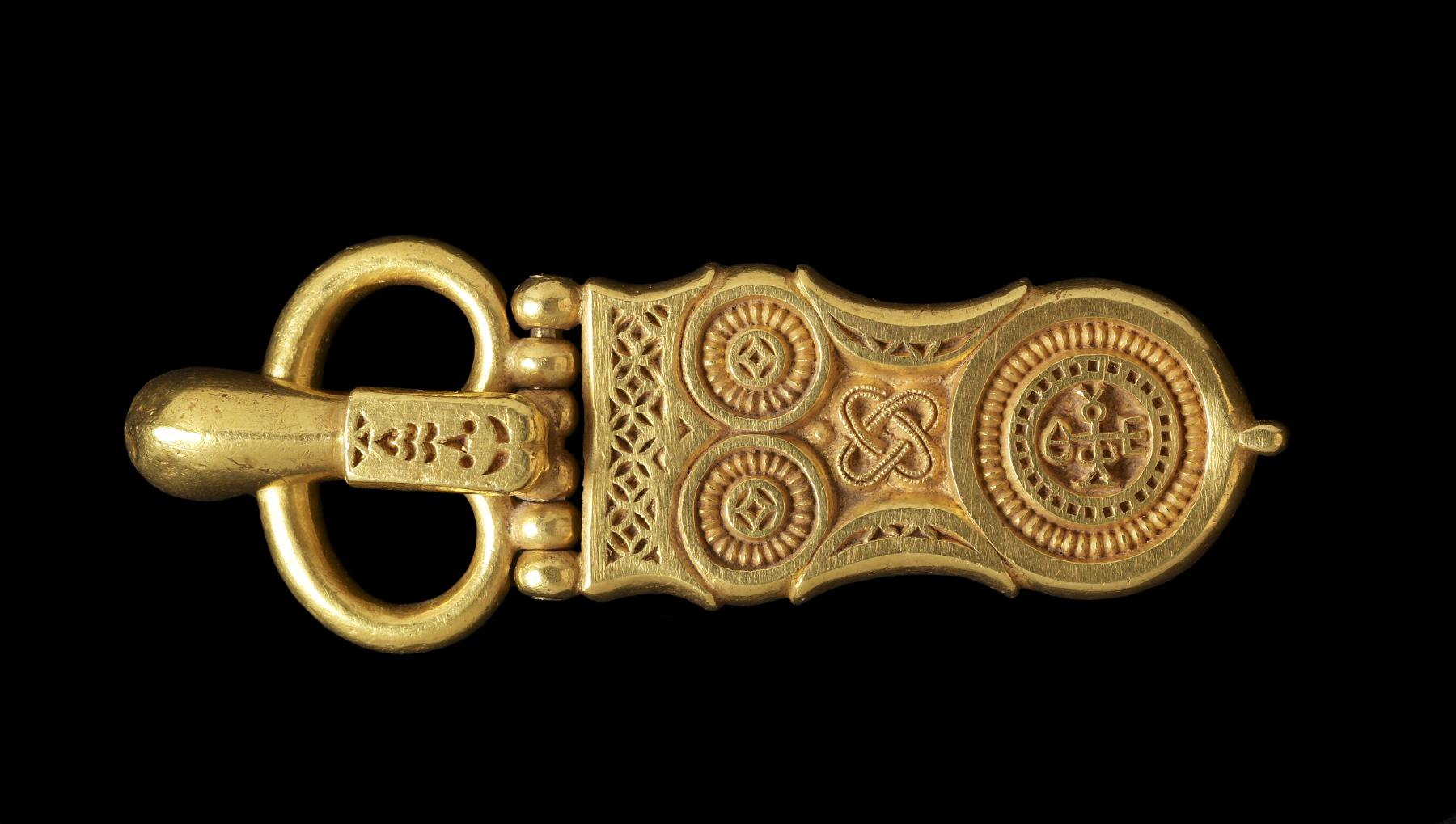
Byzantine belt buckle from the late 6th or 7th century, with the chape to the right

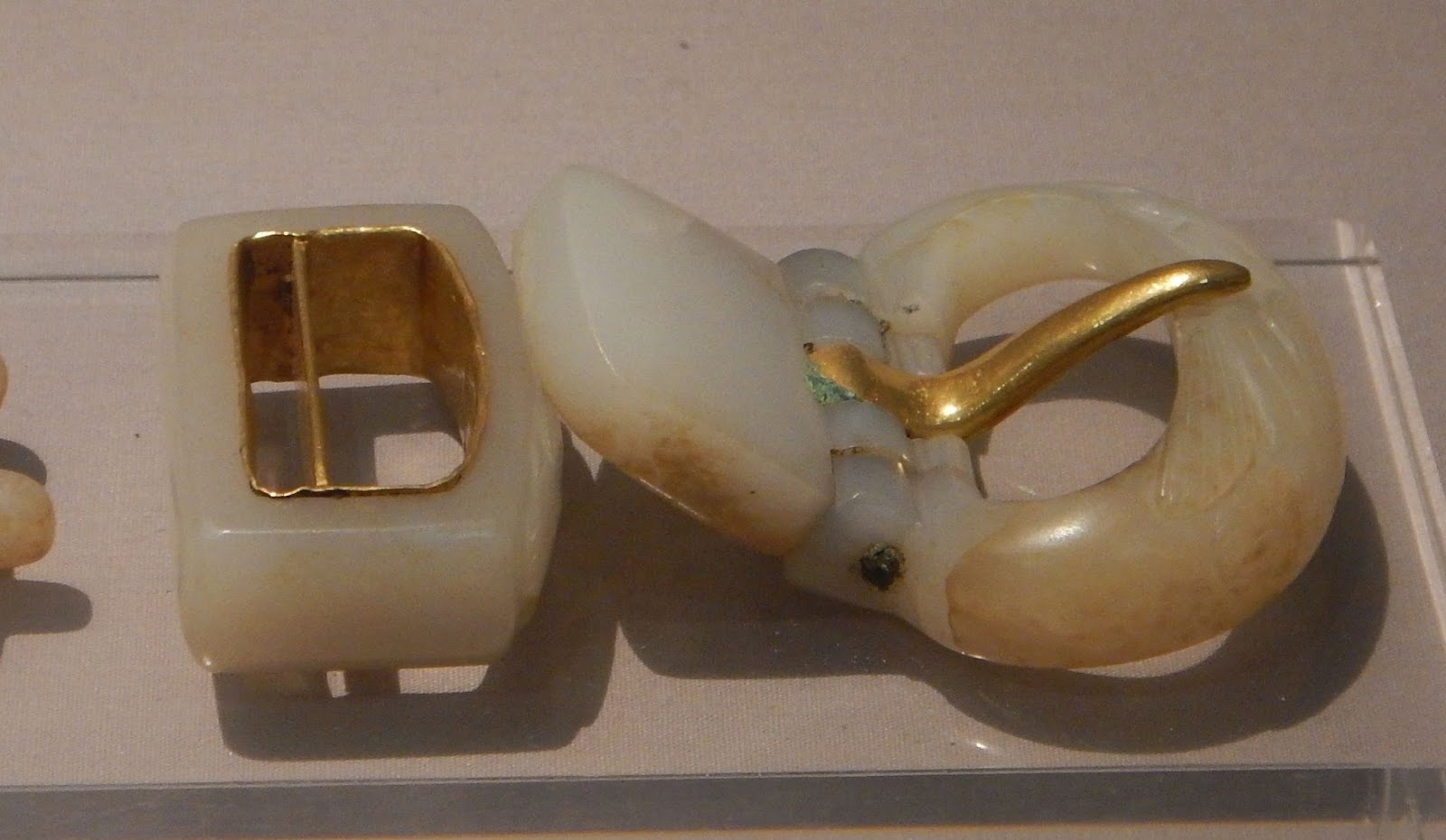
A Ming dynasty white jade belt buckle with gold

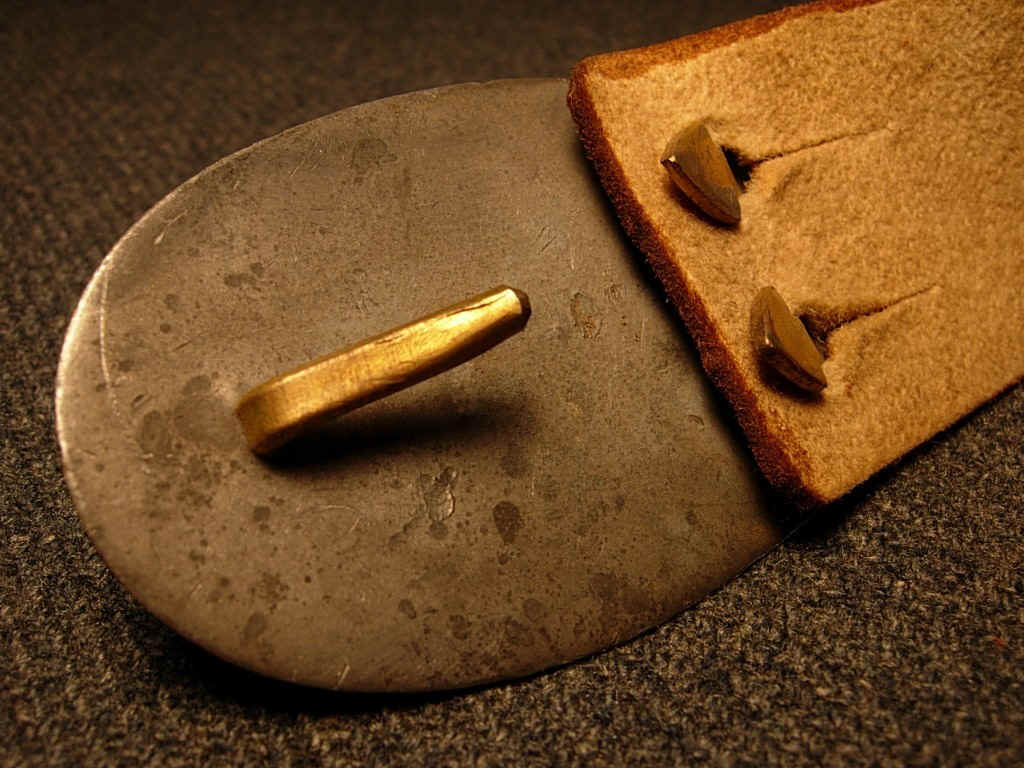
Plate-style "buckle: Back side of original US Civil War buckle, showing bent-arrow chape-end attachment and single-hook mordant

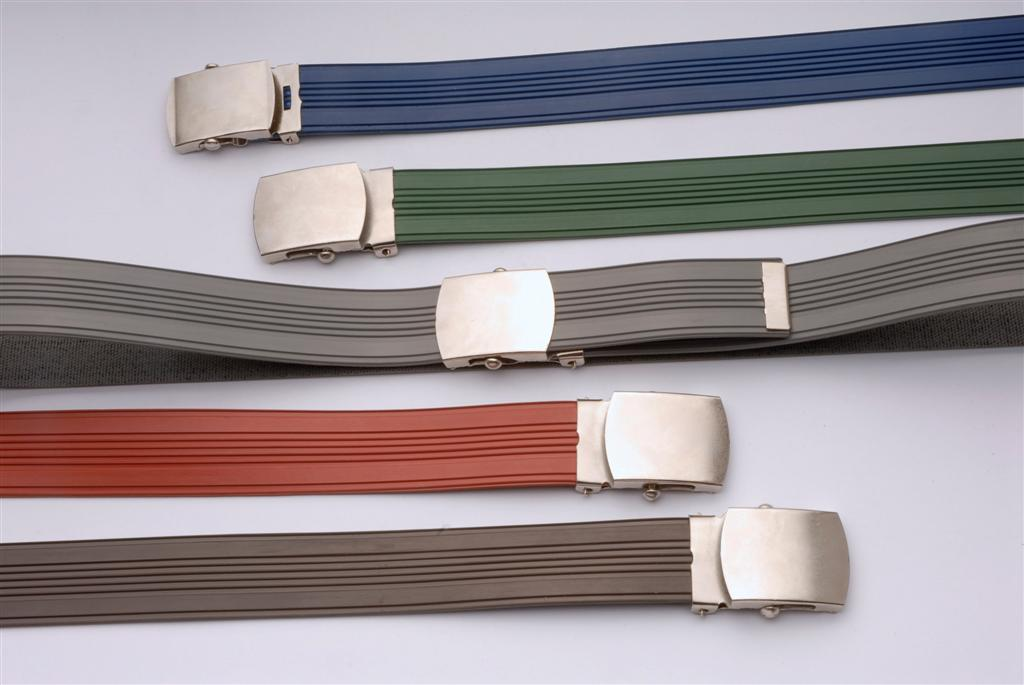
Box-frame "buckle: Box-frame "buckles"

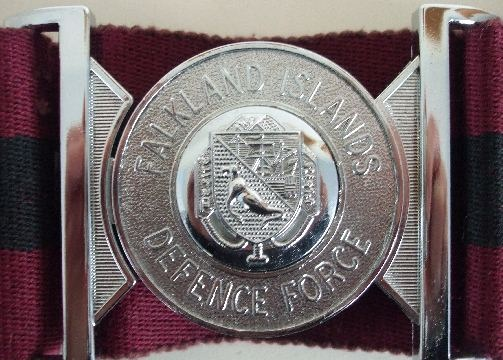
Stable belt buckle of the Falkland Islands Defence Force

== Rise in popularity ==
Because of their strong association with military equipment, belt buckles were primarily a masculine ornament well into the 19th century.

Belt buckles became more popular as fashion accessories in the early 20th century, as the tops of trousers moved more toward the waist. "Western-style" belt buckles were largely popularized by cowboy movies in the United States and are often awarded to winners in rodeo events as prize medals or trophies, a custom later adopted by the Western States Endurance Run and a few other ultra-marathons. The large, flat surface of the western-style belt buckles make them a popular ornament or style of jewelry. Decorative "buckle sets" may contain a metal buckle, one or more matching loops which sit next to the buckle and a metal tip for the opposite, "tongue" end of the belt. "Belt plates" may be decorative covers for a plain buckle or other decorative fittings affixed to the belt itself, similar to "conchos" (from a Spanish word for "shell"). Decorative belt loops are sometimes awarded in scouting for participation in or completion of activities.
