= Molle =

Molle may refer to:

== Places ==
- Mölle, Höganäs Municipality, Skåne County, Sweden; a town in southwestern Sweden
- Mollé, Kouka, Banwa, Burkina Faso; a town
- Mulli (Peru), a mountain in Peru also spelled "Molle"
- Molle Glacier, Antarctica
- Molle Islands, Queensland, Australia; an island group of the Whitsunday Islands
  - South Molle Island
  - Molle Islands National Park
- Ponte Molle, the Italian name of Ponte Milvio, a bridge over the Tiber River in Rome

== People ==
=== Surnamed ===
- Angelo Dalle Molle (1908–2001) Italian businessman
- Jean Molle (born 1933), French sprint canoeist
- Joseph Boniface de La Môle (1526–1574) French nobleman who appears in Shakespeare
- Jules Molle (1868–1931) French politician
- Norbert Van Molle, Belgian sportshooter
- Robert Molle (born 1962) Canadian sportsman

== Other uses ==
- MOLLE (modular lightweight load-carrying equipment), a version of load-bearing gear used by the U.S. military
- Mollé Mystery Theatre, an American anthology radio program, 1943 to 1948 sponsored initially by Sterling Drugs, manufacturers of Mollé Brushless Shaving Cream.
- Schinus molle, an evergreen tree native to Peru and Brazil

== See also ==
- Lille Molle (disambiguation)
- Mulli (disambiguation)
- Mollis (disambiguation)
- Molles (disambiguation)
