= Lightweight Rucksack =

Primary rucksack used by United States troops during the Vietnam War

The Lightweight Rucksack was the primary rucksack utilized by United States troops during the Vietnam War, though additionally used in arctic and alpine areas. It replaced the M1952 rucksack (FSN 8465-261-6931) and was in turn replaced by the ALICE field packs (medium and large) in 1973. The 1967 Training Circular TC 10-8. Lightweight Rucksack: Nylon OG106 served as a "how to use" manual.

== History and physical features ==
Its ensemble consisted of a nylon pack with a cinch cord, top flap and three exterior pockets and a tubular aluminum frame with padded shoulder straps and waist belt. The Lightweight Rucksack, Nylon, OG106 (FSN 8465-782-3248) was developed in 1962 as a part of the United States Army's efforts to develop suitable equipment for use by Special Forces, long-range reconnaissance patrols, and mountain and arctic troops. Testing was conducted by the 5th Special Forces Group (Airborne) in Alaska and in the Panama Canal Zone.

Four patterns of the lightweight rucksack exist, with the latter two models featuring attachment points which allow the pack itself to be mounted in two and three locations on the frame, respectively. A prototype rucksack was produced in 1962, featuring a welded frame. The 1964 model was virtually the same, but with the contract information stamped in the pack rather than sewn in on a label. The next improvement came along in 1965, when the frame was changed to a riveted version rather than a welded one. The last modification was made in 1968, with the addition of a middle horizontal back strap.

== Field use and replacement ==
In South Vietnam, the lightweight rucksack replaced and augmented the M1956 and M1961 versions of combat packs, (a.k.a. 'buttpacks'), and was later partially replaced by the tropical rucksack of the M1967 MLCE (designed specifically for jungle warfare). The rucksack was typically mounted low on the frame allowing bulky equipment to be strapped above.

Stocks of lightweight rucksacks were replaced in United States military service beginning in 1974, with the adoption and production of the ALICE equipment.
