= Mollis (disambiguation) =

Mollis is a municipality in the canton of Glarus in Switzerland.

Mollis may also refer to:

== People ==
- A. Ralph Mollis (born 1961), the current Secretary of State of Rhode Island
- Kristi Mollis, American businesswoman and education professional

== Other uses ==
- Mollis (grape), another name for the Spanish wine grape Listan Negro

== See also ==
- B mollis
- C. mollis (disambiguation)
- D. mollis (disambiguation)
- N. mollis (disambiguation)
- Molli railway
- Mullis (surname)
- Mulli (disambiguation)
- Molle (disambiguation)
- Molles (disambiguation)
