= M-1956 load-carrying equipment =

Equipment

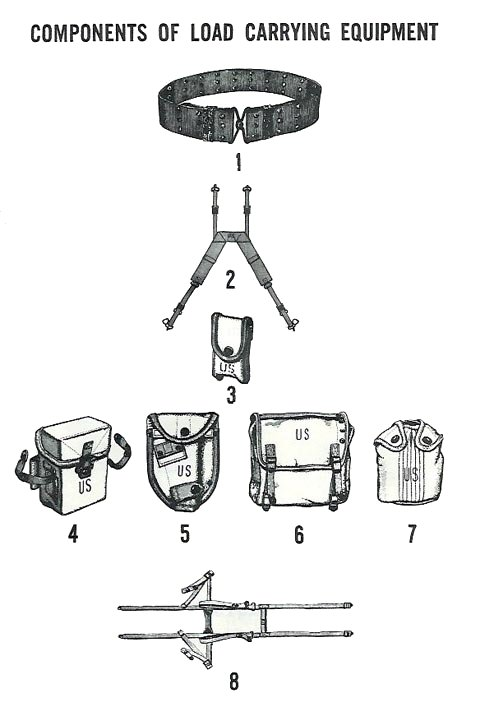
Standard issue M-1956 LCE components from the manual "Heavy Hints For Light Packs", circa 1962.

The M-1956 load-carrying equipment (LCE), also known as the individual load-carrying equipment (ILCE), was developed by the U.S. Army and first issued in the early 1960s. The M-1956 LCE was designed to replace the M-1945 Combat Pack, the M-1923 cartridge belt, the M-1936 pistol belt and the M-1937 BAR magazine belt. The M-1956 LCE was designed to be quickly configured, using no tools, to accommodate various mission and ammunition loads. The M-1956 LCE remained in service through the 1980s and set the standard for future United States military load-carrying equipment.

== Individual equipment belt and individual equipment belt suspenders ==
The M-1956 LCE continued application of the belt-supported-by-suspenders concept, adopted by the U.S. Army at least as early as the pattern 1903 equipment. The M-1956 "Belt, Individual Equipment" or pistol belt differed little in form and function from the M-1936 pistol belt and would accommodate any of the pouches and equipment that would mount on the M-1936 belt. The M-1956 pistol belt had size adjustment hardware at both ends and a "ball type" buckle connector. The M-1956 pistol belt was manufactured of olive drab cotton webbing to United States military specification MIL-B-40158 and was produced in two sizes: Medium, for waists under 30-inches (FSN 8465-577-4925), and Large, for waists over 30-inches (FSN 8465-577-4924). Earlier production M-1956 belts have horizontal weft while later production have vertical weft. The belt has a blackened metal buckle and three rows of eyelets. Eyelets in the top row were usually used for connection of the suspender hooks. The middle row of eyelets accepts the size adjusting hooks. The lower row of eyelets was usually used for attaching accoutrements utilizing an M-1910 double hook.

The olive drab U.S. Army Shade 7 cotton "Suspenders, Individual Equipment Belt" (also designated "Suspenders, Field Pack, Combat, M-1956") were manufactured in Regular (FSN 8465-577-4922), Long (FSN 8465-577-4923), and X-Long (FSN 8465-823-7231) lengths to United States military specification MIL-S-40160. All sizes are additionally adjustable in length by means of cam buckles. A single web keeper is sewn across the top of each shoulder pad. Metal rectangular rings, for attachment of the ammunition pouch suspension hooks and sleeping bag carrier, are located at the top of the front straps. The straps of the suspenders have metal hooks on the ends for connection to the pistol belt and field pack. The hook hardware on the front straps includes integral triangular rings to accept the sleeping bag carrier tie-down straps. The back suspender strap hooks connect either to the field pack or, if the field pack is not to be used, directly to the pistol belt. Early production suspenders have open, formed-wire J hooks on both front and back straps. Later production suspenders utilize snap hooks on the rear straps and stamped aluminum J hooks on the front straps. The underside of the shoulder pads is thinner drill in earlier-production suspenders and twilled nylon in some of the latest examples.

== Slide keepers ==
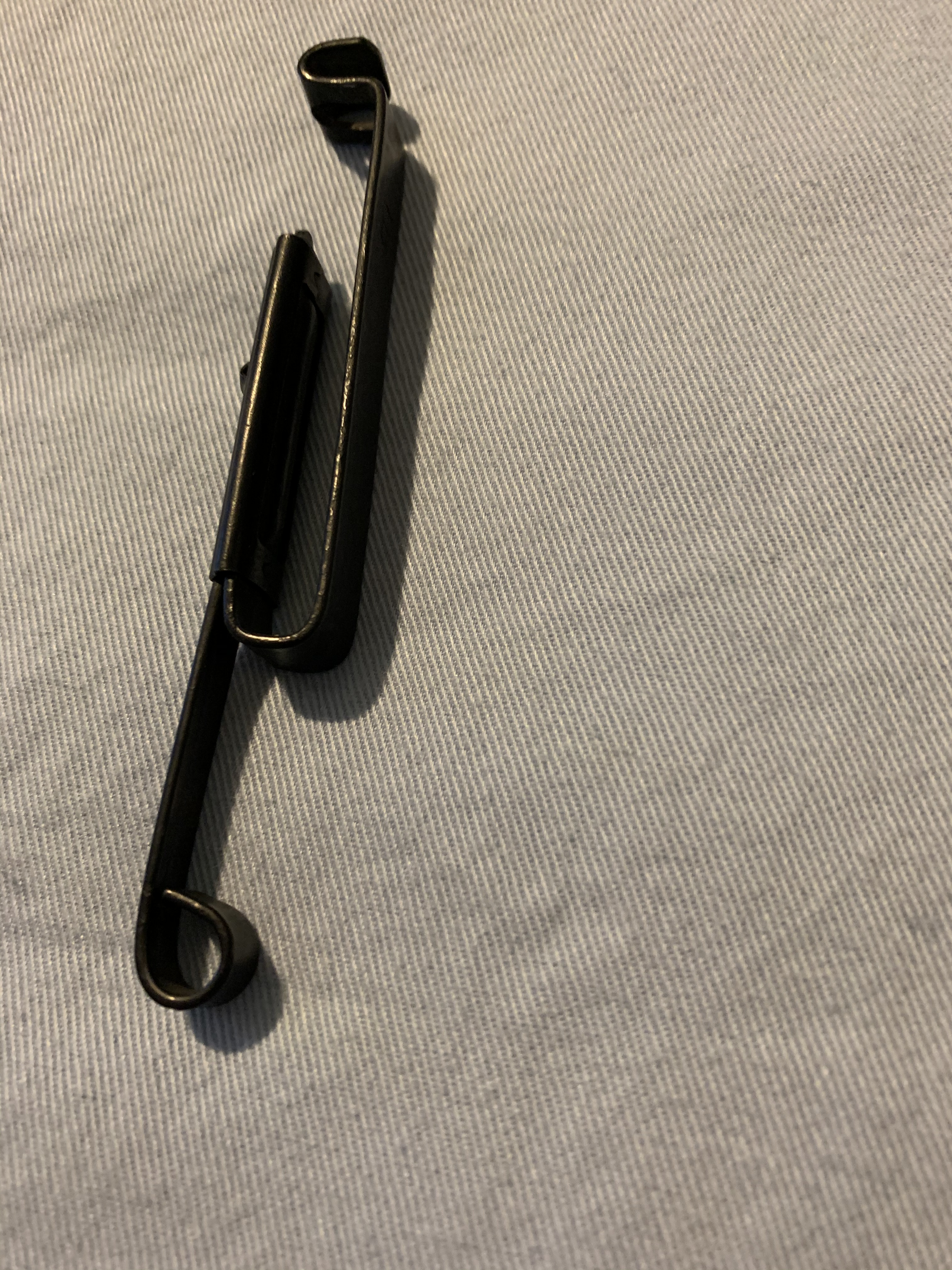
Fastening device, known as a slide keeper, adopted by U.S. Army with M-1956 individual load carrying equipment

Slide keepers were used to attach the various pouches of the M-1956 equipment to the pistol belt. Slide keepers were formed of steel strip, the two main parts being a U-shaped part and a sliding straight part. When closed the keeper formed a rectangle that tightly held equipment to the pistol belt. Holding equipment close to the belt reduced bouncing that occurred with M-1910 double hook attached equipment and allowed pouches to be mounted in places where there were no eyelets (such as the suspenders). All M-1956 equipment and that of the subsequent M1967 MLCE and ALICE systems incorporated slide keepers. Slide keepers are now colloquially called ALICE clips.

== Small arms ammunition case ==
In 1956 the US Army employed several types of cartridge belts for soldiers armed with the M1 Garand, BAR belts for those armed with the M1918 Browning Automatic Rifle, 3- and 5-cell pockets for those armed with sub-machine guns, a pocket for 15 round M1 Carbine and M2 magazines, and two different pockets for the 30 round magazines, in addition to 2- and 3-cell grenade pouches. The M-1956 small arms ammunition case sought to replace all of these with a pair of simple pouches capable of holding either a 6-pocket M1 bandoleer of M1 Garand en bloc clips (8-rounds each; total of 48 rounds), 8 x M1 Garand en bloc clips (8 rounds each; total of 64 rounds), 2 x BAR magazines (20-rounds), 4 x M1 or M2 carbine magazines (30-round), 3 x 40mm M79 grenades, or 2 x M26 hand grenades plus 2 x hand grenades fastened on the sides of the case.

The equipment came at a time when the M14 Rifle was being tested, and the ammunition pouch was thus also designed to hold 2 x M14 magazines (20-rounds each). It was also later found to be capable of only holding 3 M16 magazines (20-rounds each) despite the significant size difference between the magazines. A pouch with dimensions better suited to the 20-round M16 magazines was later produced (see Modifications paragraph below).

The cases were issued in pairs and worn at the front of the belt on either side of the buckle. Like all other M-1956 equipment they were constructed of heavy canvas. The top flap was closed by means of a metal eyelet and cloth tab closure. Early models featured a steel plate at the front both to maintain rigidity and to protect the ammunition. Two hand grenades of any type in the US arsenal could be attached on either side of each pouch, with the spoon hooked through a web strap and another web strap with snap-closure wrapped around the top. Like other pouches in the system, the ammunition pouches each attached to the web belt with a pair of slide keepers and, uniquely, an adjustable length strap with a closable hook which connected to the rectangular hook on the suspenders, intended to keep the case upright and transfer some of the weight directly to the shoulders.

== Canteen cover ==
With the adoption of the M-1956 equipment, the M-1910 1-quart aluminum canteen and later World War II-production of the M-1910 canteen were made with Corrosive Resistant Steel (Aluminum canteens were still made alongside CRS canteen) remained in service well into the 1960s, later replaced by a plastic variant introduced in 1962. Both were of similar dimensions and slightly curved to sit comfortably on the hip. As a result, the M-1956 canteen cover was not fundamentally different from the earlier models with the exception of the use of two slide keepers in lieu of the M-1910 double hook and metal snaps for closure instead of lift-the-dot fasteners. Constructed of cotton duck with taped edges, the M-1956 canteen cover had a synthetic wool felt lining for insulation and was slightly oversized to accommodate both the canteen and the canteen cup. Covers produced after 1966 have nylon-taped edges. Typically canteen covers also demonstrate the most visible signs of age, fading easily due to continuous wetting and drying. Originally a single canteen and cover was issued and worn either on the belt between the small arms ammunition case at the front and the field pack (see below) at the rear, or mounted on the side of the field pack. Troops in Vietnam generally carried two or more canteens, and this practice largely continued after the war, as, with the adoption of larger complementary rucksacks (see Complementary equipment below), the intrenching tool carrier (see below) often migrated to attachment points on the rucksack, freeing space on the pistol belt for another canteen.

== First aid case ==
The M-1956 first aid case served the same function as the earlier M-1942 first aid packet or lensatic compass case. The case was made from cotton duck and featured a simple flap closure fastened by a blackened "glove-type" snap. A single slide keeper was mounted on webbing sewn to the back of the case, and later production incorporated an eyelet at the bottom of the pouch for water drainage. Each soldier was issued one first aid case for carrying a field dressing, and those whose duties required them to carry a lensatic compass would have a second first aid case for that purpose. Placement varied with unit standards, but the first aid case was usually mounted in one of three places – on one of the suspender shoulder pad web keepers (often mounted with the opening downward, for quick access), on the pistol belt between the buckle and ammunition case, or on the grenade mounting webbing on the side of one of the ammunition cases.

== Intrenching tool carrier ==
The M-1956 intrenching tool carrier was constructed primarily of cotton duck and similar in shape to the earlier M-1943 carrier, reflecting the shape of the blade of the intrenching tool and incorporating an opening at the bottom for the handle of the tool. Leather reinforcement protected the duck from the edges of the tool blade. The rounded, webbing-reinforced flap lid of the carrier was fastened closed by means of a round spring socket-and-stud snap fastener rather than the Lift-the-DOT or One-Way-Lift type fasteners used on the M-1943 carrier. Another distinct feature was provision for mounting a bayonet scabbard on the carrier. The scabbard mountings were sewn to the front of the carrier at an angle and consisted of a cotton duck rectangle carrying two eyelets to receive an M-1910 double hook, a leather reinforcement sewn partially underneath the duck rectangle, and a snap fastened strap to hold the scabbard against the front of the carrier. Two slide keepers, for attaching the carrier to the pistol belt, were mounted on webbing sewn to the back of the carrier. The carrier was located on the wearer's left side of the pistol belt next to the field pack, although it was alternatively mounted in other locations or on other equipment depending on mission requirements.

== Field pack ==
The field pack was sized to hold rations such as a meal, combat, individual (C-ration) along with sparse personal implements, for example shaving kit and extra socks. The field pack's placement at the rear of the pistol belt led to it being referred to colloquially as the "butt pack." The M-1956 pattern field pack featured two flaps, on the left and right inside, to cover the contents of the pack, and an approximately square top cover flap. This design was changed in the M-1961 field pack (see Modifications). Common features of both include cotton duck construction, slide keepers for attachment to the pistol belt, and a pair of eyelets at the top of the pack for attaching the suspenders. Both also included a web handle at the top, webbing on the side of the container to facilitate mounting of accoutrements with slide keepers, eyelets near one edge of the top cover to receive M-1910 double hooks, and a pair of web straps at the bottom of the pack for attaching items like the poncho and poncho liner. Both also featured a card holder with a plastic window at the top of the cover flap.

== Sleeping bag straps ==
An H-shaped arrangement of web straps just short of an inch in width was issued to secure the bed roll on the back above the field pack. At the "H" intersection were a pair of friction buckles, and the straps would go around the roll and be attached at these buckles. The other end of the straps were designed to be looped under the web strap on the padded portion of the suspenders, through the metal ring at the front of the suspenders and fastened back onto themselves by lift-the-dot fasteners on the straps. This arrangement effectively made use of the empty upper back area to carry the sleeping bag, but the weight of the bed roll and field pack had a tendency to pull the pistol belt up to the soldier's chest at the front. The sleeping bag straps fell out of use with the adoption of larger rucksacks (see Complementary equipment below) and were not widely used in Vietnam given the lack of need for a sleeping bag in the tropical climate there. They were used prior to the introduction of rucksacks to carry a bedroll with a poncho, poncho liner, and air mattress. They were occasionally used to carry a bumble of four to six M72 LAW antitank rockets.

== Modifications ==
New weapons and field experience led to a few minor changes in the basic M-1956 equipment during the 1960s.

In 1961 an experimental quick release pistol belt was introduced (known as the Davis belt). It was almost identical to the previous model but had a stamped metal buckle in which a bent tab fit through a slot, and remained closed through friction. It was brought into limited service, but never replaced the previous belt by any means.

In 1961 some minor changes were made to the field pack to make it more practical for field use. The resulting M1961 field pack was essentially similar to the M-1956 model, but had an expandable flap lid instead of the flat flap lid, and it had longer poncho straps. It also added a long internal rubber-coated collar to the pack's opening, instead of the two inside duck flaps, in an attempt to better keep the contents dry.

In 1964, a 2nd pattern of the small arms ammunition case were introduced that was missing the plastic stiffener in front. This allowed the case to carry three M14 magazines side-by-side rather than two.

In 1965, slightly modified small arms ammunition cases came into service to coincide with the adoption of the 5.56×45mm NATO M16 rifle. Four of the 20-round magazines fit snugly into the M-1956-pattern cases, but their shorter size meant a void space at the top of the case which was too small to be useful for anything else. As a result, cases were produced in 1965 and 1966, identical to the M-1956 patterns but slightly shorter. By this point the M16 had been accepted for general issue, replacing the M14s as well as M1 Garands, M1/M2 carbines, M1918 BARs, and SMGs still in service, so the general purpose nature of these cases was no longer essential. These cases did not necessarily fully replace the M-1956 pattern but were issued alongside them.

== Complementary equipment ==
Other elements of individual equipment, while not part of the M-1956 system, were often used in conjunction. These include:

- Bayonets — M1942, M4, M5, M6, or M7, or M9
- Intrenching tool
- Packboard — A molded plywood frame with canvas back pad, shoulder straps and lashing cord.
- M1951 mountain rucksack — A cotton duck and leather pack with aluminum frame for extended loads.
- M1952 rucksack — Cotton duck pack with steel frame.
- Lightweight rucksack — A nylon pack with frame replacing the M1952 rucksack in 1963.
- Tropical rucksack — A similar but larger pack, augmenting and replacing some Lightweight Rucksacks in 1967.
- ARVN rucksack — A canvas pack used by the Army of the Republic of Vietnam and some US troops during the Vietnam War.
- PRC-25 radio carrier — A canvas back-mounted carrier with integral metal frame and straps for carrying manpack radios.
- Radio accessory case — A roughly rectangular canvas bag with slide keepers, for spare antenna and handset.
- XM3 bipod carrying case — A rectangular canvas pouch with slide keepers about one and a half feet long with top closure.
- Small arms accessory case — Rubberized nylon pouch about 6 by 3 inches, for cleaning accessories.
- M1916 holster — A black (at this time) leather holster with wire hanger, for the M1911A1 .45 caliber pistol.
- M1912/M1918/M1923 pistol magazine pocket — Two-cell pocket for 7-round .45 pistol magazine, attached by web belt loop. Produced in drab, light olive drab shade 3, and olive drab shade 7.
- P1956 pistol magazine pocket — nearly identical to the M1923 in olive drab shade 7, but with two metal slide keepers on the reverse for attachment to a belt.

== United States military use ==
The M-1956 load-bearing equipment was originally adopted for use exclusively by the United States Army while the other services retained various combination of M1910-M1945 style equipment, and the Marine Corps developed its own 1961 pattern. During the Vietnam War however the Army's M-1956 and M1961 improvements came into use across the services and remained in widespread service with various independent components of the M1967 MLCE until being replaced by the all-purpose lightweight individual carrying equipment (ALICE), of a more practical nylon construction, officially beginning in 1974. Elements of M-1956 gear could still be found used in conjunction with ALICE gear as late as the 1990s, especially the field pack, for which ALICE offered no replacement, and the suspenders which some regard as more comfortable than those of the ALICE system.

== Foreign use ==
Foreign use of the M-1956 equipment could (and can still) be found in nations to which the United States provided military assistance during its period of use, including the armies of the Republic of Vietnam (formerly), Khmer Republic (formerly), Kingdom of Laos (formerly), Kingdom of Thailand (formerly), Republic of Korea (still actively), certain US-sponsored Latin American organizations, among many others.

Australia and New Zealand also used M-1956. Initially, during the Vietnam War using it in combination with 37 and 44 pattern webbing, both of British origin, however eventually they both came up with their own larger designs of ammunition pouch, which are more closely based upon those used by the British Army on 58 pattern webbing.

== Performance and replacement ==
The M-1956 LCE effectively equipped the United States Army during a period of changing weapons, and proved effective in its ability to be tailored to different missions and operational priorities. Its influence can be seen in the M1967 MLCE and ALICE equipment which replaced it. The primary downfall of the M-1956 equipment which led to its ultimate replacement was its canvas construction, which made it less durable, more absorbent, and heavier than nylon equipment.

== See also ==
- M-1967 modernized load-carrying equipment
- All-purpose lightweight individual carrying equipment
- MOLLE
- Shoulder belt (military)
