= C. mollis =

C. mollis may refer to:

- Clitoriopsis mollis, a plant species
- Cratylia mollis, a plant species in the genus Cratylia

== See also ==
- Mollis (disambiguation)
