= Modernized load-carrying equipment =

Type of military bag

M1967 Modernized Load-Carrying Equipment
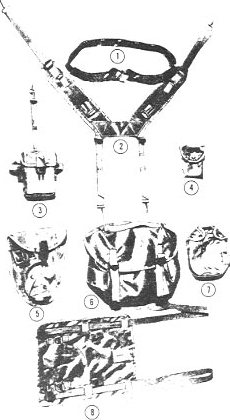
- Original components of the M-1967 MLCE
- Place of origin: United States

Service history
- In service: 1968–1970s
- Used by: United States Army
- Wars: Vietnam War

Production history
- Designed: 1960s
- Produced: 1968

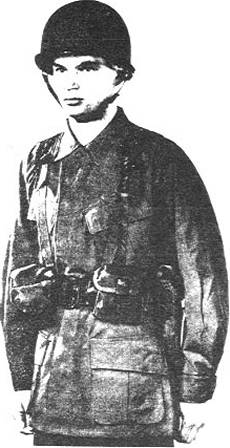
US Army infantryman wearing the M-1967 MLCE circa 1967

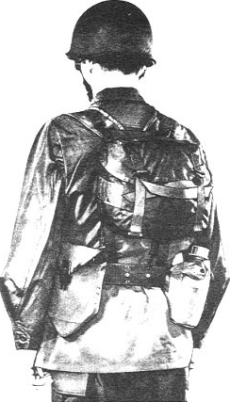
US Army infantryman wearing the M-1967 MLCE circa 1967

The M1967 Modernized Load-Carrying Equipment, also known as lightweight load carrying equipment, was introduced into United States Army service in 1968 during the Vietnam War. Designed to supplement rather than replace the then-standard M-1956 load-carrying equipment, it was similar to its predecessor but used nylon rather than canvas duck. Issue was very limited, and it saw service mostly in Southeast Asia.

== History ==
The United States Army entered the conflict in Southeast Asia with the canvas and cotton duck M-1956 load-carrying equipment (LCE). Developed in the early 1950s, the LCE was designed for use with all small arms then in service with the Army. Deficiencies with the LCE were immediately realized once fielded in the tropical climates of Vietnam. Canvas, cotton duck and webbing, even when treated to prevent mildew, is still affected by it, along with dry rot due to constant wetting and drying. Cotton also absorbed a great deal of water, adding to its weight, and was slow drying; it also withstood abrasion poorly.

As with just about everything else in use in Vietnam by the Army, from boots to field dressings to ammunition packaging, the design of load-carrying equipment was also changed in an effort to provide lightweight individual equipment that could better withstand the rigors of a tropical environment.

Nylon duck and webbing proved to be lightweight, unaffected by mildew, fast-drying (it absorbed little water), and resisted abrasion well. It did have limitations: it was shiny when new, it was somewhat stiff, and it made a rustling noise against vegetation. It also melted when exposed to high heat.

The M-1967 MLCE, initially termed lightweight load-carrying equipment (LLCE), was developed specifically for use in Southeast Asia. Its issue began in 1968, but never fully replaced the LCE nor was it issued in complete sets. The MLCE consisted essentially of the same items of similar design as the LCE, but substituted nylon for cotton, and aluminum and plastic for steel and brass hardware where possible.

Nylon's light weight and durability led the United States Army to consider the MLCE for Army-wide adoption. A study was undertaken in the early 1970s to identify any shortcomings and to propose improvements for a new load-carrying equipment system to replace the LCE and MLCE.

The MLCE continued to serve the Army well into the 1970s until replaced by the ALICE.

== Components ==
The M-1967 MLCE has the following components:

- Belt, individual equipment medium [NSN 8465-00-935-6815]
- Belt, individual equipment large [NSN 8465-00-935-6816]
- Carrier, entrenching tool [NSN 8465-00-935-6826]
- Carrier, sleeping equipment [NSN 8465-00-935-6813]
- Case, field first aid dressing – unmounted magnetic compass [NSN 8465-00-935-6814]
- Case, small arms ammunition [NSN 8465-00-935-6780]
- Cover, water canteen [NSN 8465-00-860-0256]
- Field pack [NSN 8465-00-935-6825]
- Suspenders, individual equipment belt [NSN 8465-00-935-6830]

The following individual equipment items are issued alongside the M-1967 MLCE:

- Cover, water canteen, 2-quart, collapsible [NSN 8465-00-927-7485]
- Rucksack, tropical [NSN 8465-00-935-6673]
- Vest, ammunition carrying, 40mm [NSN 8465-00-141-0926-series]

In 1969 a new version of the "case, small arms ammunition" was introduced for use with the 30-round cartridge magazine for the Rifle, 5.56 Millimeter, M16A1:

- Case, small arms ammunition [NSN 8465-00-926-6610]

NOTE: all component items that utilize snap fasteners for closure have plastic snaps. After 1969 these are replaced with metal versions.

== See also ==
- All-purpose lightweight individual carrying equipment or ALICE
- Individual integrated fighting system or IIFS
- Modular lightweight load-carrying equipment or MOLLE
- Correaje Tempex used by the Argentine Army
- Personal load carrying equipment or PLCE
