= Individual Integrated Fighting System =

Lightened load-carrying system of the US military

Integrated Individual Fighting System
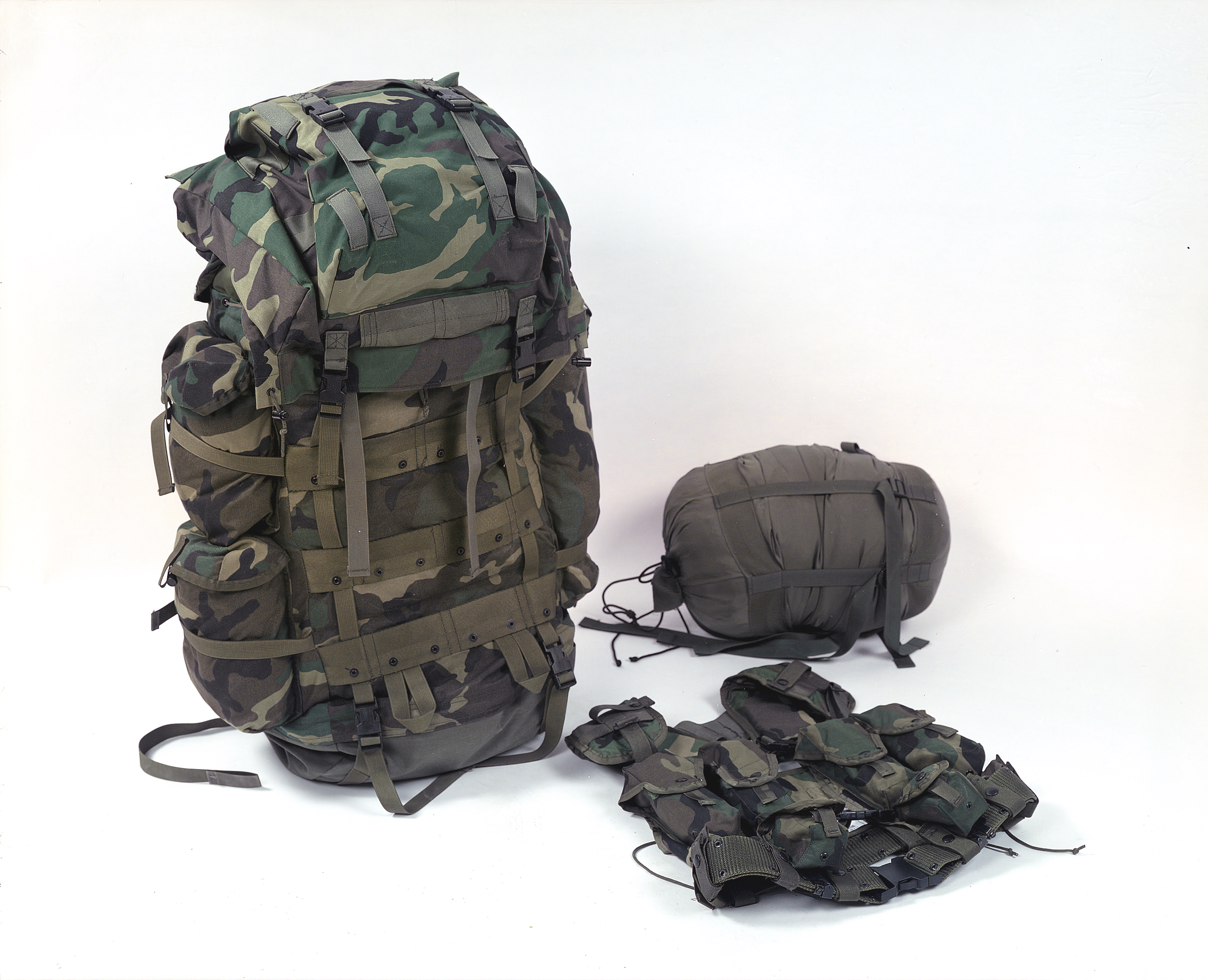
- IIFS components: the FPLIF pack, TLBV vest, and ECWSS sleeping bag
- Type: Load-carrying equipment
- Place of origin: United States

Service history
- In service: 1988–2008
- Used by: U.S. Army; U.S. Marine Corps; U.S. Navy; U.S. Air Force
- Wars: Cold War; Invasion of Panama; Persian Gulf War; Kosovo War: Global War on Terrorism; War in Afghanistan; Iraq War

The Integrated Individual Fighting System (IIFS), often appropriated as "Individual Integrated Fighting System" in unofficial contexts, is a load-carrying equipment and existence system. It was introduced in 1988 as a possible replacement for the All-purpose Lightweight Individual Carrying Equipment (ALICE) system, itself employed by the United States military since 1973.

The components of IIFS are: the ITLBV (Individual Tactical Load-bearing Vest), later replaced by the ETLBV (Enhanced Tactical Load-bearing Vest); the Grenade Carrier Vest (GCV); the Field Pack, Large with Internal Frame (FPLIF); and the ECWSS (Extreme Cold Weather Sleeping System) sleeping bag, cover, and sleep accessories.

The official name of the vest is ITLBV (Individual Tactical Load-bearing Vest), though it is sometimes shortened to TLBV (Tactical Load-bearing Vest). It is also unofficially known as the 'M-1988 LBV' or 'LBV-88'. The ETLBV (Enhanced Tactical Load-bearing Vest) was a redesign of the TLBV in the mid-1990s. The ETLBV addressed problems with ventilation and access of magazines, adopting mesh panels and slanted ammunition pockets in their place.

Replacing the ALICE and IIFS systems were the MOLLE (modular lightweight load-carrying equipment) and subsequent MOLLE II generation. The MOLLE generations were phased into U.S. Army and U.S. Marine Corps service during the late 1990s to early 2000s.

== History ==
=== Background ===
The IIFS has conceptual roots in combat and load carrying vests designed by Natick Laboratories for the employment and use by United States Navy SEALs during the Vietnam War. The concept of a load carrying vest is that the weight of the equipment carried by the infantry rifleman is more evenly distributed over the body than with the employment of a load carrying concept of older design.

The IIFS load carrying vest, as having been a major conceptual improvement over precuring load-bearing systems, was designed to replace the individual equipment belt, individual equipment belt suspenders, and small arms ammunition cases. These components have been an integral part of the ALICE system. The small arms ammunition cases continue to be utilized with the IIFS concept, to enable the carriage of additional small arms munitions.

=== Development ===
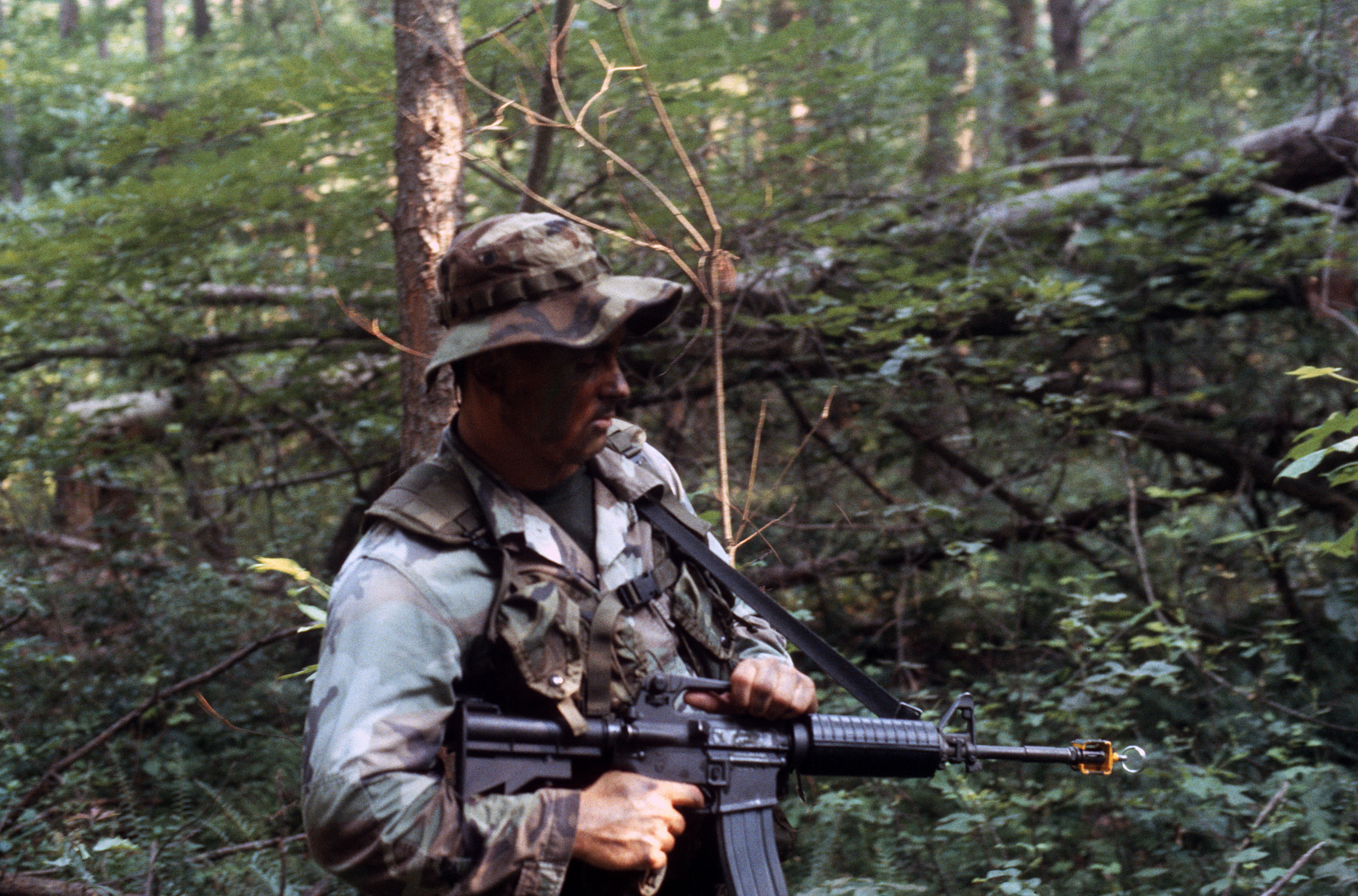
A pre-production variant of the TLBV in use on 19 July 1987, by a student at the Scout Sniper Instructor School at Quantico, Virginia, armed with an early M4 carbine and moving through the woods while on patrol during a field training exercise

Trial variants of the IIFS have utilized both the ALICE water canteen cover and ALICE field first aid dressing case in the woodland camouflage pattern. The entrenching tool cover had remained unchanged and was also utilized during testing.

In the original design, as well as during troops trials, the TLBV incorporated panels made of Kevlar, to improve the protection of the infantry rifleman, when worn in conjunction with the PASGT flak vest. The weight of this prototypic vest was considered to be too excessive to continue to consider this concept.

=== Replacement ===
The IIFS has been phased out in the United States Armed Forces, and was replaced with MOLLE and MOLLE II during the 2000s.

== Fighting load components ==
Like the ALICE system, the IIFS can be broken down into a fighting load and an existence load. The entire system consists of eight separate components.

The IIFS fighting load consists of the following standard issue components:

- Vest, Ammunition Carrying. [NSN 8415-01-317-1622]
- Vest, Tactical Load Bearing. [NSN 8415-01-296-8878]

=== Tactical load-bearing vest ===
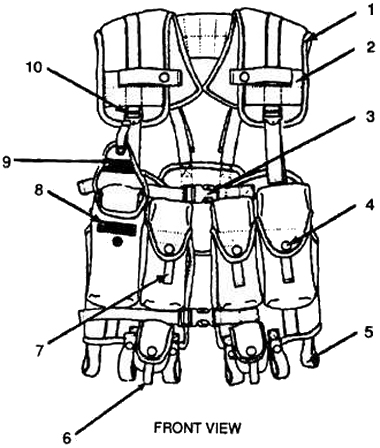
IIFS Tactical Load-bearing Vest

The primary component of the IIFS, the Tactical Load-bearing Vest – TLBV (Vest, Tactical Load Bearing [NSN 8415-01-296-8878]), is constructed of a seven-ounce nylon fabric printed in the woodland camouflage pattern, and weighs 1.8 pounds empty. The TLBV is compatible with the standard ALICE individual equipment belt. The individual equipment belt is secured to the TLBV by way of 10 belt loops that use both hook and pile fasteners and snaps. The TLBV has four permanently attached ammunition pockets that can carry six 30-round cartridge magazines for the M16 assault rifle. The pocket covers are secured by one snap and a strip of hook and pile. A pull tab is used to open the pocket. Located directly below the ammunition pockets are two pockets, designed to hold the M67 fragmentation grenade, they will also hold handcuffs should a member of the US Army Military Police Corps or USAF Security Forces be wearing the vest. The shoulders are protected by 1/2 inch [1.27 cm] foam padding. The TLBV closes in front with two chest straps using plastic quick release buckles. Two 2 1/4 inch [5.71 cm] webbing sections and two D-rings sewn to the back of the TLBV can be used as equipment attachment points.

==== Enhanced vest ====
In 1995, due to issues concerning chest and back ventilation caused by the non-breathable fabrics incorporated, the TLBV was redesigned, and officially redesignated the Enhanced Tactical Load-bearing Vest (ETLBV). No changes to the national stock number have been made. The two major modifications were the slant of the magazine pouches inward, for easier removal of small arms magazines, and the exchange of the fabric panels, which retained body heat, both situated on the front and back, with lighter mesh panels. The ETLBV project was conducted under the Soldier Enhancement Program (SEP). The improved vest was phased into the supply system by the Defense Personnel Support Center in 1996 or onward.

=== 40mm grenade vest ===
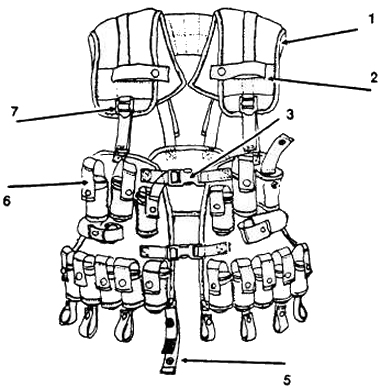
IIFS 40mm grenade vest

A secondary component of the IIFS, the 40mm grenade vest, alternatively Grenade Carrier Vest (GCV), or simply Ammunition Carrying Vest (Vest, Ammunition Carrying [NSN 8415-01-317-1622]), is intended for use by the infantry rifleman (grenadier), armed with either the M203 or M79 grenade launcher. It is constructed of a seven-ounce nylon fabric printed in the woodland camouflage pattern and weighs 2.1 pounds empty. The ammunition carrying vest is compatible with the standard individual equipment belt which is secured to the ammunition carrying vest with 10 belt loops. The loops use hook and pile fasteners and snaps. The ammunition carrying vest has 18 permanently attached ammunition pockets that can carry 4 pyrotechnic and 14 high explosive 40mm rounds. The pocket covers are secured by one snap. A pull tab is used to open the pocket. The shoulders are protected by 1/2 inch [1.27 cm] foam padding. The ammunition carrying vest closes in front with two chest straps using plastic quick release buckles. Two 2 1/4 inch [5.71 cm] webbing and two D-rings sewn to the back of the ammunition carrying vest can be used as equipment attachment points.

=== Additional related components ===
In addition, the following ALICE system components are utilized with the IIFS:

- Belt, Individual Equipment. [NSN 8465-01-322-1965]
- Carrier, Entrenching Tool. [NSN 8465-00-001-6474]
- Case, Field First Aid Dressing. [NSN 8465-00-935-6814]
- Cover, Water Canteen. [NSN 8465-00-860-0256]

==== Pistol belt ====
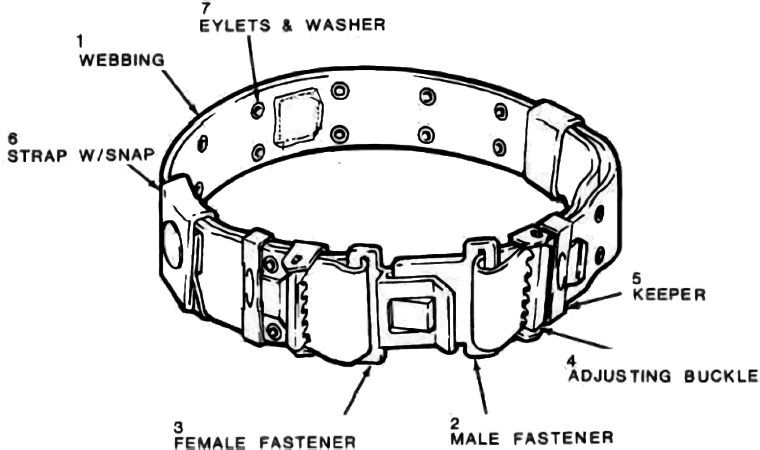
ALICE pistol belt

Along with the TLBV, a new individual equipment belt was later introduced, featuring a black plastic ITW Fastex quick-release buckle and redesigned adjustment system. The original concept included the use of the earlier renewed individual equipment belt, which featured a grey side-release buckle, commonly referred to, due to its early prestige manufacturer, as the Bianchi pistol belt. It was decided that instead of contracting new individual ALICE components in the woodland camouflage pattern, that the remainder of already existing and widely available ALICE components will be utilized with the IIFS. These being mainly the water canteen cover, the field first aid dressing case, entrenching tool cover and small arms ammunition cases.

==== Ammunition cases ====
The ALICE system small arms munitions pouch (case, small arms ammunition [NSN 8465-00-001-6482]) is also frequently used in conjunction with the IIFS to enable the carriage of additional small arms munitions. This is especially true with grenadiers (for example, M203 grenade launcher operators) utilizing the IIFS 40mm grenade vest, which has no provisions for carrying 5.56mm magazines.

==== Buttpacks ====
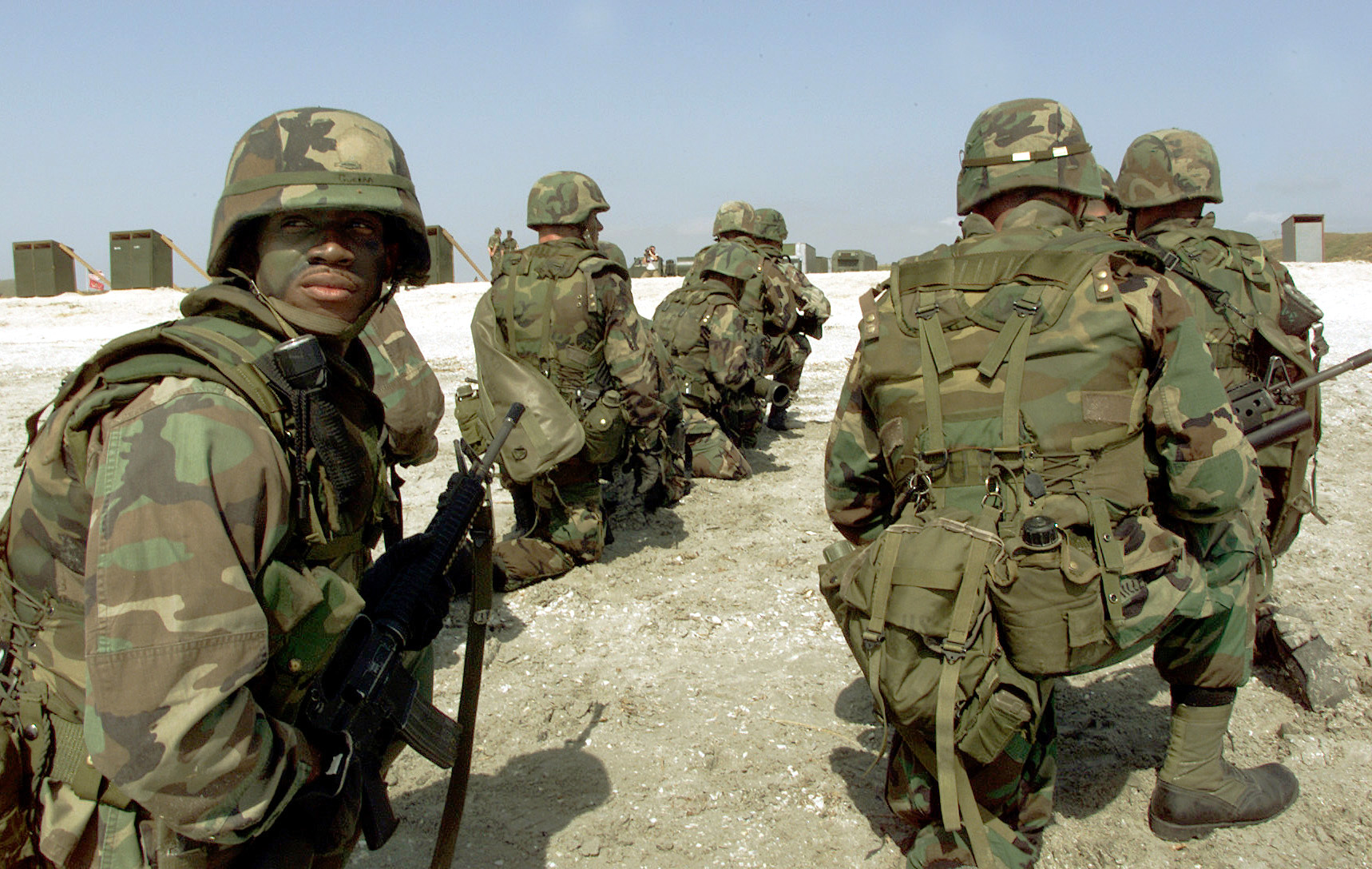
The buttpack and canteens are used in addition to IIFS vests, here of Marines from Golf Company, 25th Marine Regiment, who prepare for a simulated attack on Vadu Beach, Romania, during Exercise Rescue Eagle 2000 on 12 July 2000

During Operation Just Cause in 1989 and Operation Desert Storm in 1991, the M-1967 Modernized Load-carrying Equipment (MLCE) system's field pack (field pack [NSN 8465-00-935-6825]) was issued for use with the IIFS system. Officially designated the 'Training Field Pack', it is a modified olive green version of the pack, sometimes referred to by soldiers as a "buttpack", has been utilized for a three-day training pack (it typically used with the ALICE system, yet not a designated component of it).

In the mid-1990s, the Improved Combat Butt Pack (ICBP) was designed to be the replacement for previous field packs, under the Soldier Enhancement Program (SEP). The improvements of the ICBP included: increasing camouflage effectiveness with use of the woodland camouflage; enlarging the overall size due to an increased load demand; being lighter weight than previous buttpacks; and, by using new attachment rings (i.e., O-rings) with a pair of quick release buckles near the opening of the pack, simplifying its ease of access and wear. Additionally, the new plastic-material of the hardware (i.e., the buckles, ladderlocks, D-rings, etc.) had the benefit of eliminating loud clinking or jangling noises potentially generated by legacy metal hardware.

After the Project Manager-Soldier (PM-Soldier)'s approval, the improved buttpack was to be phased into the supply system by the Defense Personnel Support Center, while residual supplies of the original buttpack were drawn down. Sometime in September 1996 was the estimated date of supply, according to the Soldier Systems Command (SSCOM)'s The Warrior magazine.

== Existence load components ==
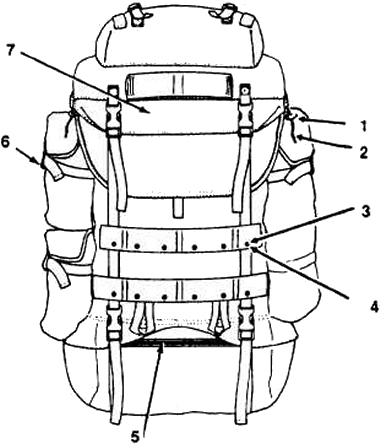
IIFS Field Pack, Large with Internal Frame

The IIFS existence load comprises the following components:

- Field Pack [NSN 8465-01-286-5356]
- Pack, Patrol, Combat [NSN 8465-01-287-8128]

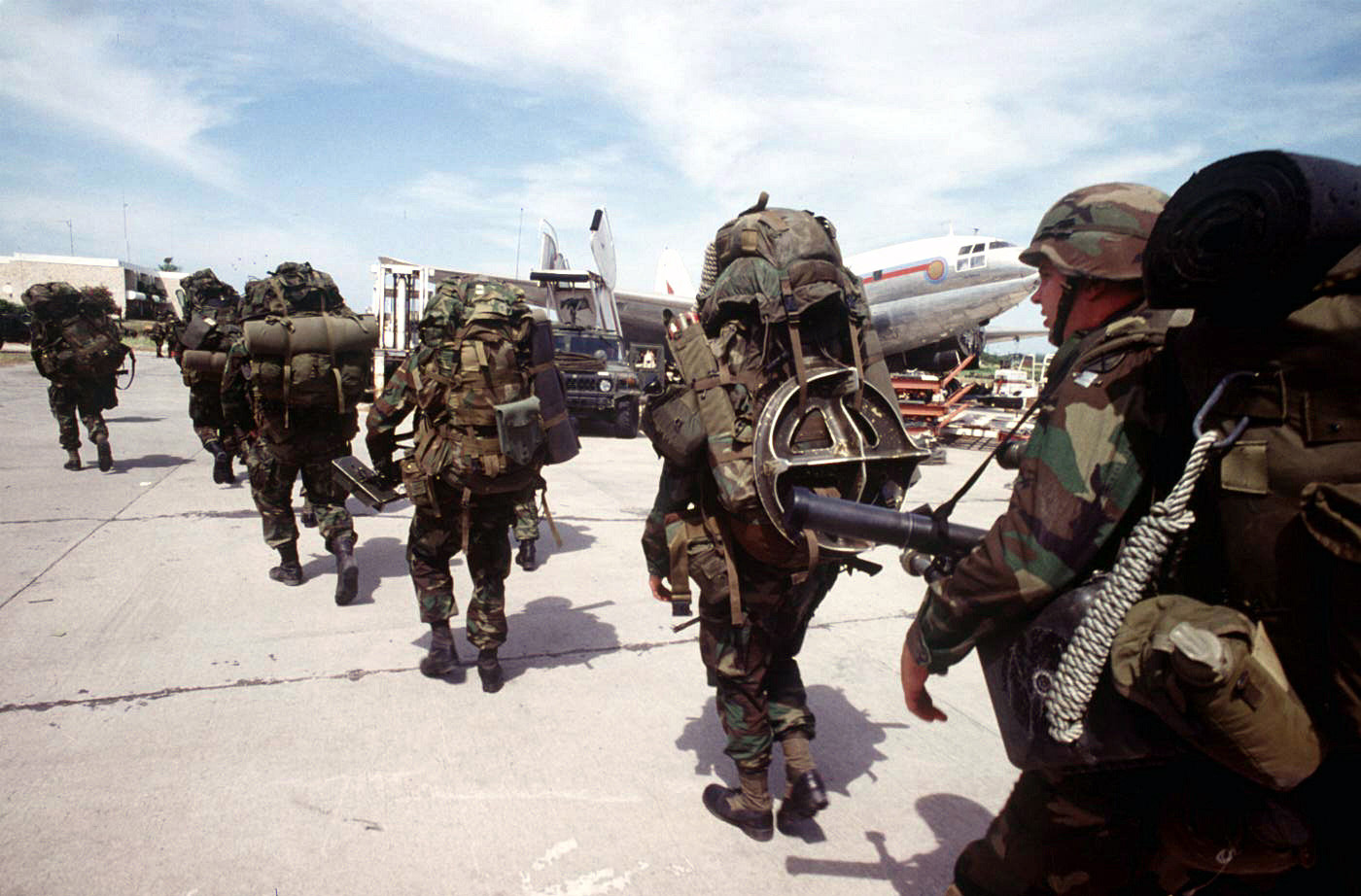
Carrying FPLIF packs and patrol packs, soldiers of C Company, 2nd Battalion 22nd Infantry, 10th Mountain Division, are seen securing Port-au-Prince Airport on 22 September 1994, the first day of Operation Uphold Democracy

=== Field pack ===
The field pack, also known as Field Pack, Large with Internal Frame (FPLIF), or named commercially as Combat Field Pack 1990 (CFP-90), is constructed of an 8.0 ounce backcoated nylon fabric printed in the woodland camouflage pattern (which has excellent abrasion resistance and water repellency). The weight of the empty field pack is 8 pounds. Two major sections make up the field pack; the sleeping bag compartment, and the main compartment. The main compartment has a false bottom that may be opened for full use of the field pack when a sleeping bag is not carried. The outside of the field pack has one long tunneled pocket and two smaller cargo pockets, all using compression straps for securing contents. Equipment attachment points in the form of 2 1/4 inch [5.71 cm] webbing and 1 inch [2.54 cm] webbing loops are located throughout the field pack.

Early versions of the pack were produced by Lowe and are considered superior to the production "CFP-90"; the principal reason for this is the use of cotton thread on the production model. The Lowe version is distinguished by having a brown canvas sleeping bag compartment, no top closing flap (the "Pack, Patrol, Combat" is used instead), a black snow collar, a unique suspension system, and black nylon thread.

The internal frame comprises two aluminum staves running the full height of the field pack. The staves are removable. The suspension system is adjustable allowing the user to position the field pack where it is most comfortable. The field pack has lower back padding as well as an extended lumbar support pad and the shoulder pads are made of bi-laminate foam. A softer, open cell foam is against the body for comfort followed by a stiffer closed cell foam for stability and good recovery after compression.

Two strap assemblies with quick release buckles allow for the attachment of the combat patrol pack atop the field pack when both packs are used together. When used in combination with either the 40mm grenade vest or TLBV, the field pack shoulder pads are worn over those of the vest, where they are retained by two one inch [2.54 cm] pieces of webbing.

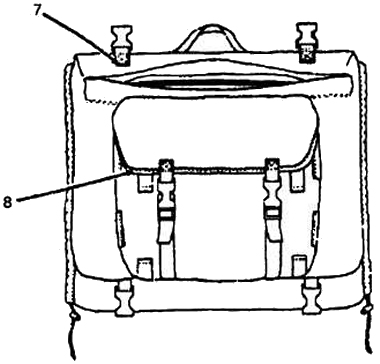
IIFS Combat Patrol Pack

=== Combat patrol pack ===
The combat patrol pack is designed for short missions and offers 1,200 cubic inches (20 liters) of cargo space in two compartments. The main compartment is padded to protect the back from heavy, sharp items. The main compartment incorporates two tiedown straps that can be used to stabilize equipment such as a field radio. The combat patrol pack has a separate shoulder harness. When used in combination with either the 40mm grenade vest or TLBV, the combat patrol pack shoulder pads are worn over the vest shoulder pads, and retained for stability by two one inch [2.54 cm] pieces of webbing. The combat patrol pack can also be used in conjunction with the field pack. With the "LCS-88" experimental version, the patrol pack attached directly to the shoulder straps of the LBV, and a waist belt was used to keep it from bouncing around.

The US Army 3 Day Assault Pack, which came later, replaced the IIFS combat patrol pack.

== Sleeping system ==
The ECWSS (extreme cold weather sleeping system) was designed to interface with the ECWCS (extended cold weather clothing system) ensemble.

The ECWSS comprises the following components:

- Sleeping Bag – The sleeping bag is made of nylon fabric that encloses a continuous filament polyester insulation. The sleeping bag is a mummy type, which uses a double 'draft tube' configuration to improve protection in the zipper area. Specifically, it has a 71-inch (180 cm) zipper that allows rapid exit. Adjustments across the shoulder and hood area can be made with the drawcord and barrel lock. A row of snap fasteners along the opening allows for the installation and removal of the bivy cover.
- Cover, Bivy – The cover is made of a moisture vapor permeable water-proof fabric. The cover was designed to be removable to facilitate better air drying of the sleeping bag.
- Bag, Stuff – The bag reduces the bulk of the sleeping bag to less than 1 cubic foot. The bag is constructed of a waterproof nylon fabric. The compression straps are made from webbing with standard buckIes.
- Hood and Socks – Included in ECWSS as accessories are a hood and socks for added head and foot climatic protection. The hood and socks are made of a polyester fiberpile material.

== See also ==
- M-1967 Modernized Load-carrying Equipment (MLCE)
- All-purpose Lightweight Individual Carrying Equipment (ALICE)
- Modular Lightweight Load-carrying Equipment (MOLLE)
