= Molles (disambiguation) =

Molles is a commune in Allier, France.

Molles may also refer to:

== Places ==
- Los Molles, San Luis, Argentina; a village
- Molles River, Chile; a river
- Los Molles Formation, Argentina; a geologic formation

== People ==
- Ernest Molles, Swiss soccer player
- John Molles, 18th century Irish Anglican priest

== Other uses ==
- Crataegus ser. Molles, a botanical taxonomic division of the hawthorn genus Crataegus

== See also ==
- Molle (disambiguation)
- Mollis (disambiguation)
