= All-purpose lightweight individual carrying equipment =

Military personal equipment system

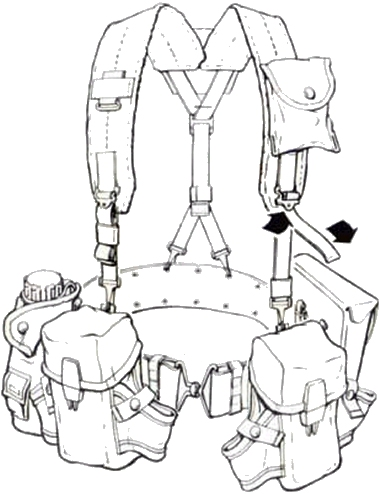
- ALICE components circa 1973
- Place of origin: United States

Service history
- In service: 1973–1997 (fully phased out of U.S. service in the mid-2000s)
- Used by: See Users
- Wars: Lebanese Civil War; Salvadoran Civil War; Invasion of Grenada; Invasion of Panama; Persian Gulf War; Somali Civil War; Kosovo War; War in Afghanistan (2001–2021); Iraq War

Production history
- Designed: 1967–1973

The all-purpose lightweight individual carrying equipment (ALICE) is a set of load-carrying equipment, adopted as United States Army Standard A on 17 January 1973. The ALICE system was developed from 1967 to 1972 in the LINCLOE (lightweight individual combat clothing and equipment) program, and was initially designated the M-1972 lightweight load-carrying equipment (LLCE), switching to the ALICE name shortly afterward.

ALICE replaced the M-1956 individual load-carrying equipment (ILCE) and M-1967 modernized load-carrying equipment (MLCE). In 1988, the individual integrated fighting system (IIFS) was introduced to complement the ALICE pack and suspenders, mainly addressing center of gravity and storage space capability shortcomings. IIFS, however, was plagued by production quality control issues, and was only partially phased into service.

== Background ==
=== Fighting and existence loads ===
The ALICE system retains the concept of separate fighting and existence loads that was refined in the mid-1950s during the development of the M-1956 equipment. The most important point in the fighting and existence loads concept is that an infantry rifleman should carry only the items necessary to complete the immediate mission at hand. The load an infantry rifleman carries should not include any other item that can instead be carried another way. Because the type of mission, terrain, and environmental conditions will influence the clothing and individual equipment requirements, the unit commander may prescribe to the infantry rifleman the essential items. The primary purpose of the concept for fighting and existence loads is to lighten an infantry rifleman's load.

==== Fighting load ====
The typical individual fighting load is made up of essential items of clothing, individual equipment, small arms, and small arms ammunition that are carried by, and are essential to, the effectiveness of the combat infantry rifleman and the accomplishment of the immediate mission of the unit when the infantry rifleman is on foot. Normally these items are carried on the individual equipment belt and individual equipment suspenders.

==== Existence load ====
"Consists of items other than those in the fighting load that are required to sustain or protect the combat soldier. These items may be necessary for increased personal and environmental protection and are not normally carried by the individual." - Dictionary of Military and Associated Terms. US Department of Defense 2005.

When possible, the individual existence load items are transported by means other than man-carry. Otherwise both the fighting and existence loads are carried by the infantry rifleman. Individual existence load items are usually carried in the field pack.

== Fighting load components ==
The ALICE system fighting load comprises the following components:

- Belt, individual equipment, LC-1 (NSN 8465-00-001-6487-series)
- Carrier, entrenching tool, LC-1 (NSN 8465-00-001-6474)
- Case, field first aid dressing, LC-1 (NSN 8465-00-935-6814)
- Case, small arms ammunition, LC-1 (NSN 8465-00-001-6482), quantity two
- Cover, water canteen, LC-1 (NSN 8465-00-860-0256)
- Suspenders, individual equipment belt, LC-1 (NSN 8465-00-001-6471)
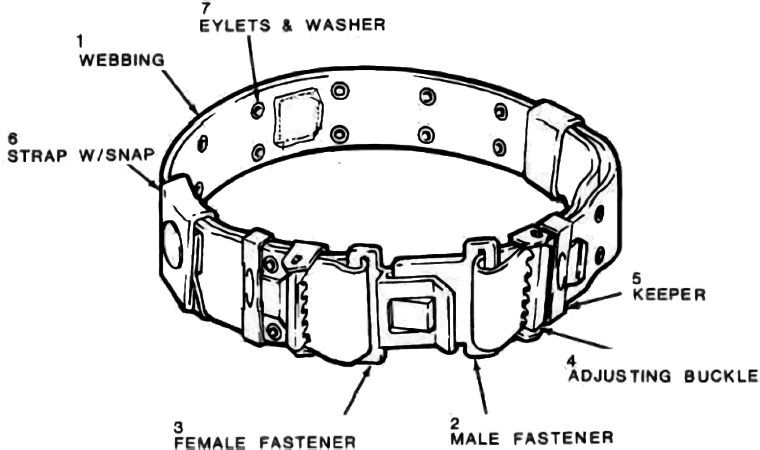
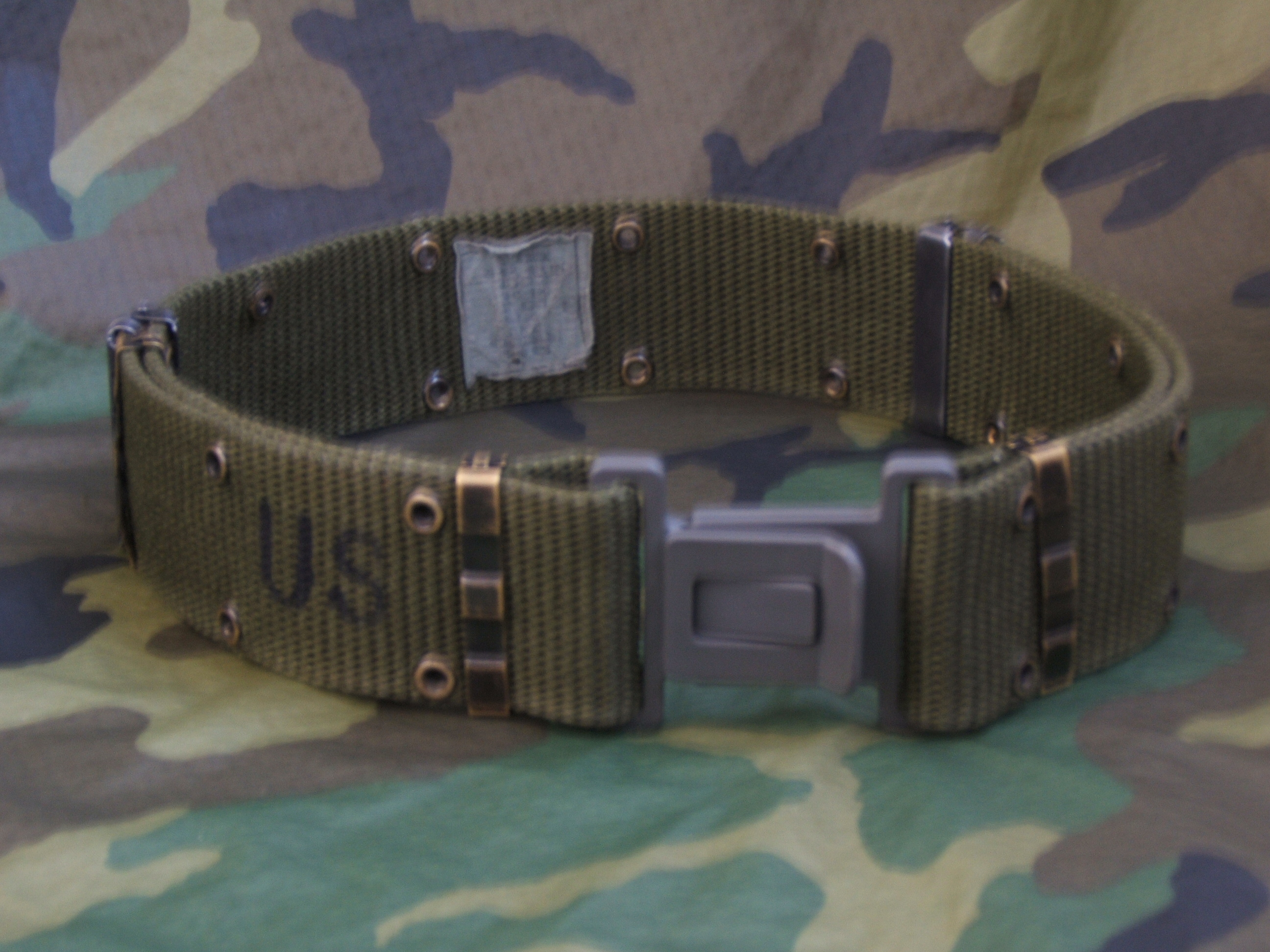
LC-2 individual equipment belt

Belt, individual equipment – The belt is constructed of Army shade 7 olive drab nylon webbing with blacked metal hardware and either 'green' (gray) or black plastic hardware. The medium size individual equipment belt (NSN 8465-00-001-6488) is for soldiers with waists measuring under 30 inches (76 cm) and size large (NSN 8465-00-001-6487) is for those with waists measuring 30 inches (76 cm) or over. The length of the belt is adjusted at each end by means of adjusting clamps which slide along the belt when opened. The ALICE system belt mounted components are attached to the belt with slide keepers. Slide keepers are colloquially known as alice clips. The bottom row of eyelets on the belt provide for mounting of accoutrements that have an M-1910 double hook. The eyelets along the top of the individual equipment belt are for attaching the individual equipment suspenders.

In 1981, the new belt, individual equipment, LC-2 was introduced with the green plastic quick-release buckle and was assigned the National Stock Number 8465-01-120-0674 (medium) and 8465-01-120-0675 (large).

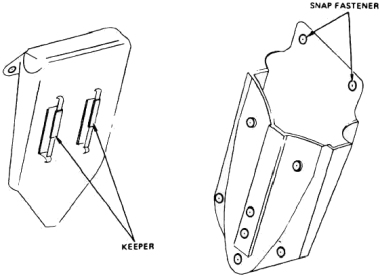
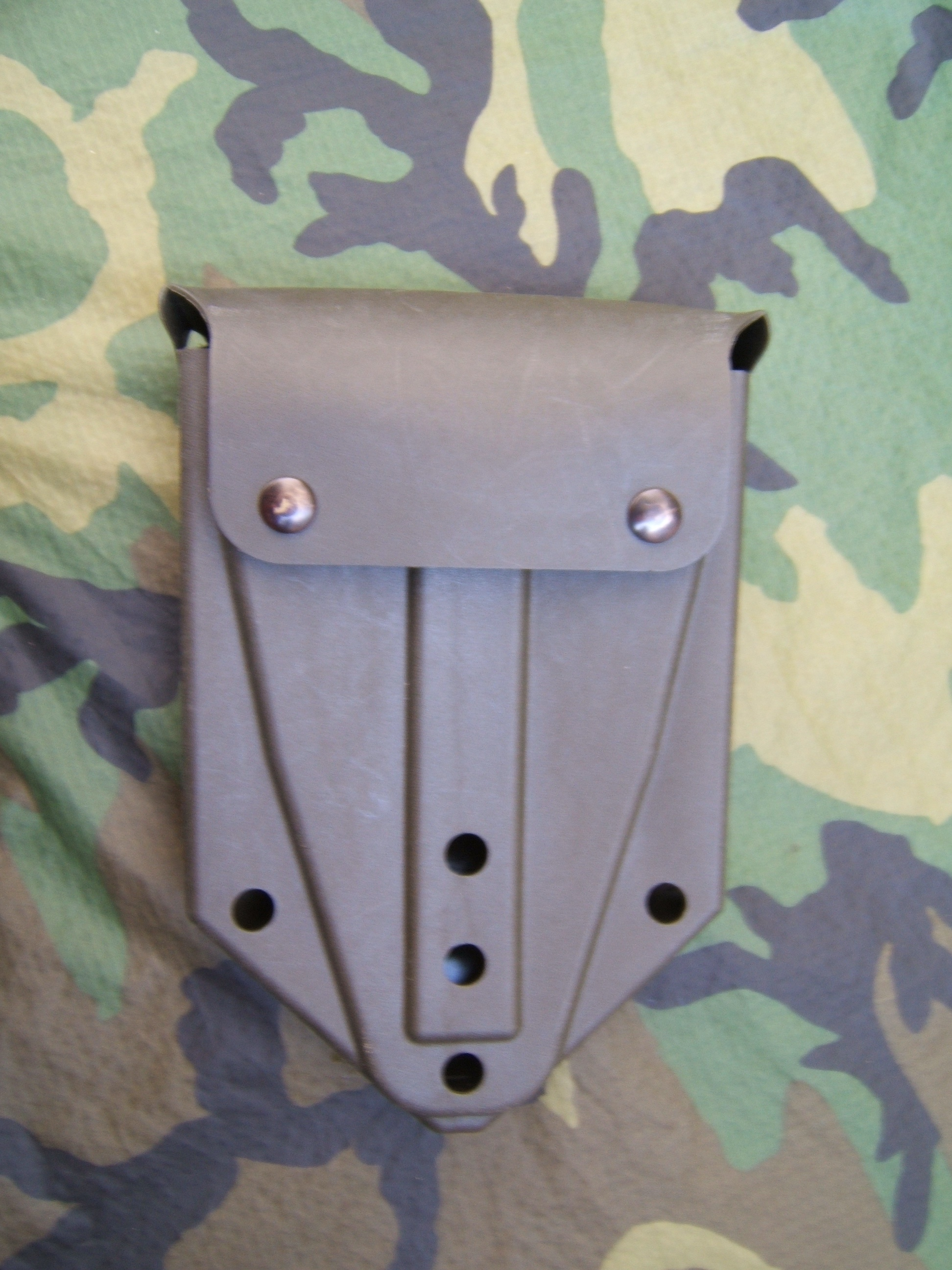
LC-1 intrenching tool carrier

Carrier, entrenching tool – The entrenching tool carrier is molded of EVA (ethylene-vinyl acetate) and the top flap is secured by means of two metal snap fasteners. It attaches to the individual equipment belt by means of two slide keepers. The entrenching tool carrier is designed to accommodate the lightweight collapsible entrenching tool, hand (NSN 5120-00-878-5932).

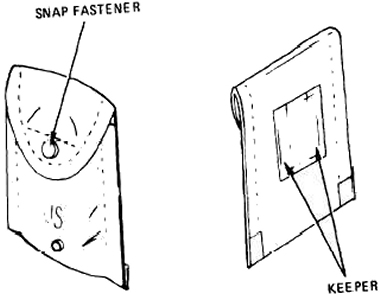
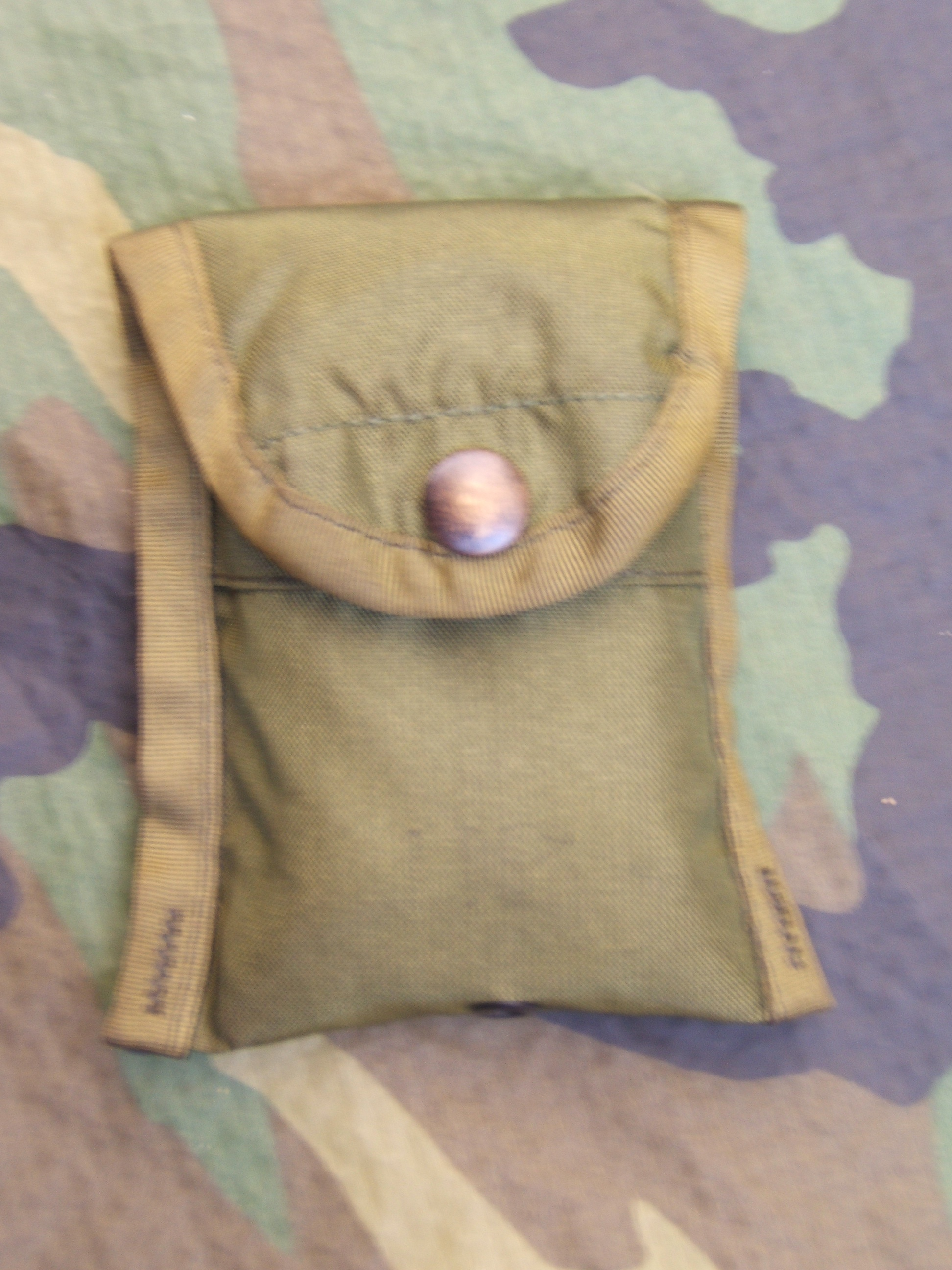
LC-1 field first aid dressing case

Case, field first aid dressing/unmounted magnetic compass – also known as first aid dressing/compass case, the first aid case is constructed of Army shade 106 olive green water repellent treated 7.25 ounces (206 g) nylon duck. It is 8 1/2 inches (22 cm) long with flap open; approximately 4 1/2 inches (11 cm) wide, and forms a 4 inches (10 cm) deep pocket. It has a metal snap-type fastener closure and is attached to the individual equipment belt or individual equipment suspenders by a single slide keeper. The field first aid dressing case is designed to accommodate either the dressing, first aid, field (NSN 6510-00-159-4883) or the compass, magnetic, unmounted (NSN 6605-00-151-5337).

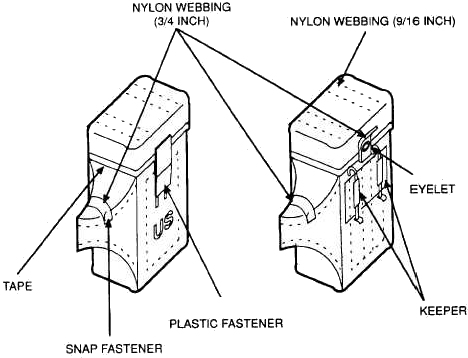
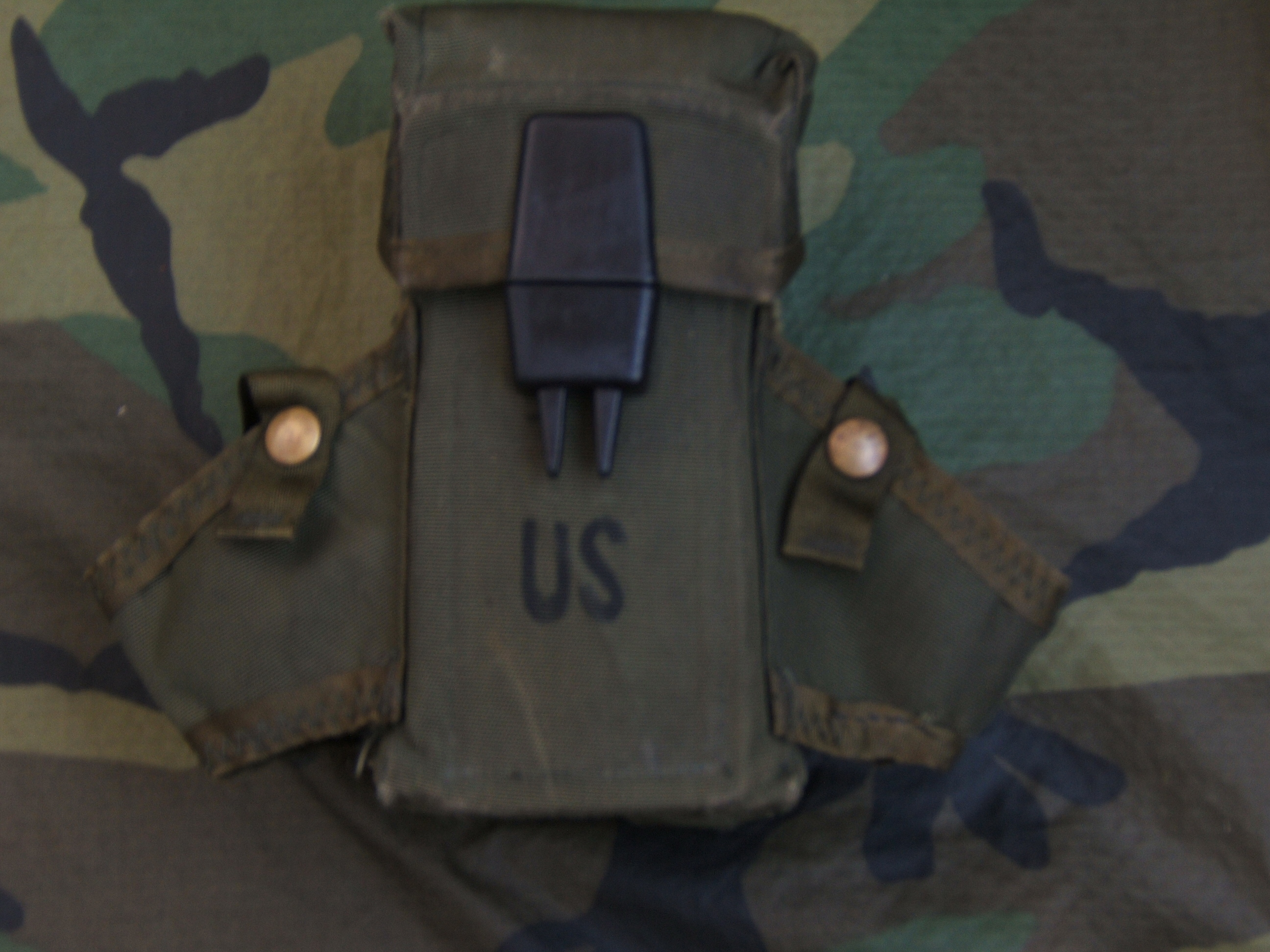
LC-1 small arms ammunition case

Case, small arms ammunition – The small arms ammunition case is designed to accommodate three 30-round magazine, cartridge (NSN 1005-00-921-5004) used with the rifle, 5.56 mm, M16A1. It is constructed of nylon duck and webbing with polyester sheet stiffeners in the front, rear and lid of the small arms ammunition case. Each cartridge magazine is held in place by means of 3/4-inch (1.9 cm) wide webbing spacers which cross the top of the small arms ammunition case. The lid is closed by means of a plastic latch. Grenade carrying pockets are located on each side of the small arms ammunition case which are secured by means of a nylon web strap and metal snap fastener. A tab with a metal eyelet is located at the top back of the small arms ammunition case to which the individual equipment suspenders are attached. The small arms ammunition case is attached to the equipment belt with slide keepers.

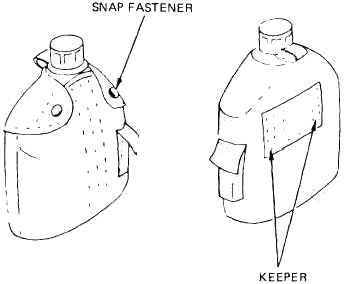
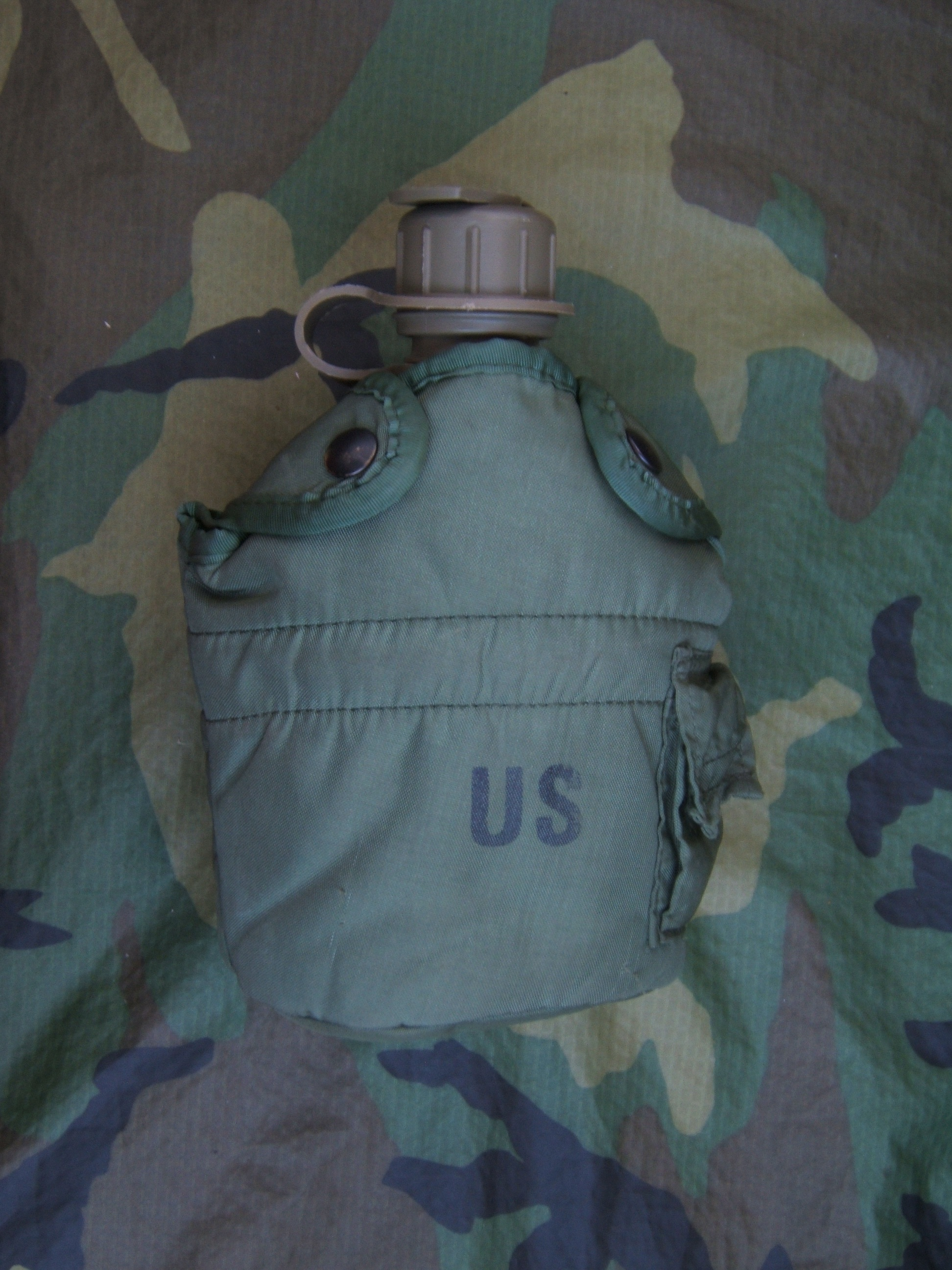
LC-2 water canteen cover

Cover, water canteen – The water canteen cover is fabricated of nylon cloth and webbing and acrylic pile liner material. The two-flap closure is secured by means of metal snap fasteners. There is a small pocket on the front of the cover for carrying water purification tablets. The lid of this small pocket is secured by means of hook and pile fastener tape. The canteen cover is attached to the equipment belt with slide keepers. The water canteen cover is designed to accommodate the canteen, water (NSN 8465-00-889-3477). In 1975, the LC-1 designation for the water canteen cover was changed to LC-2 due to some minor design changes. The national stock number remains the same.

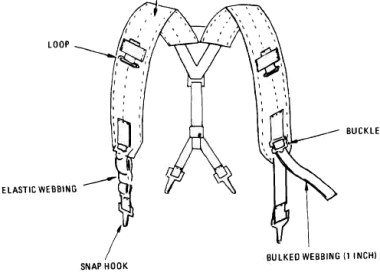
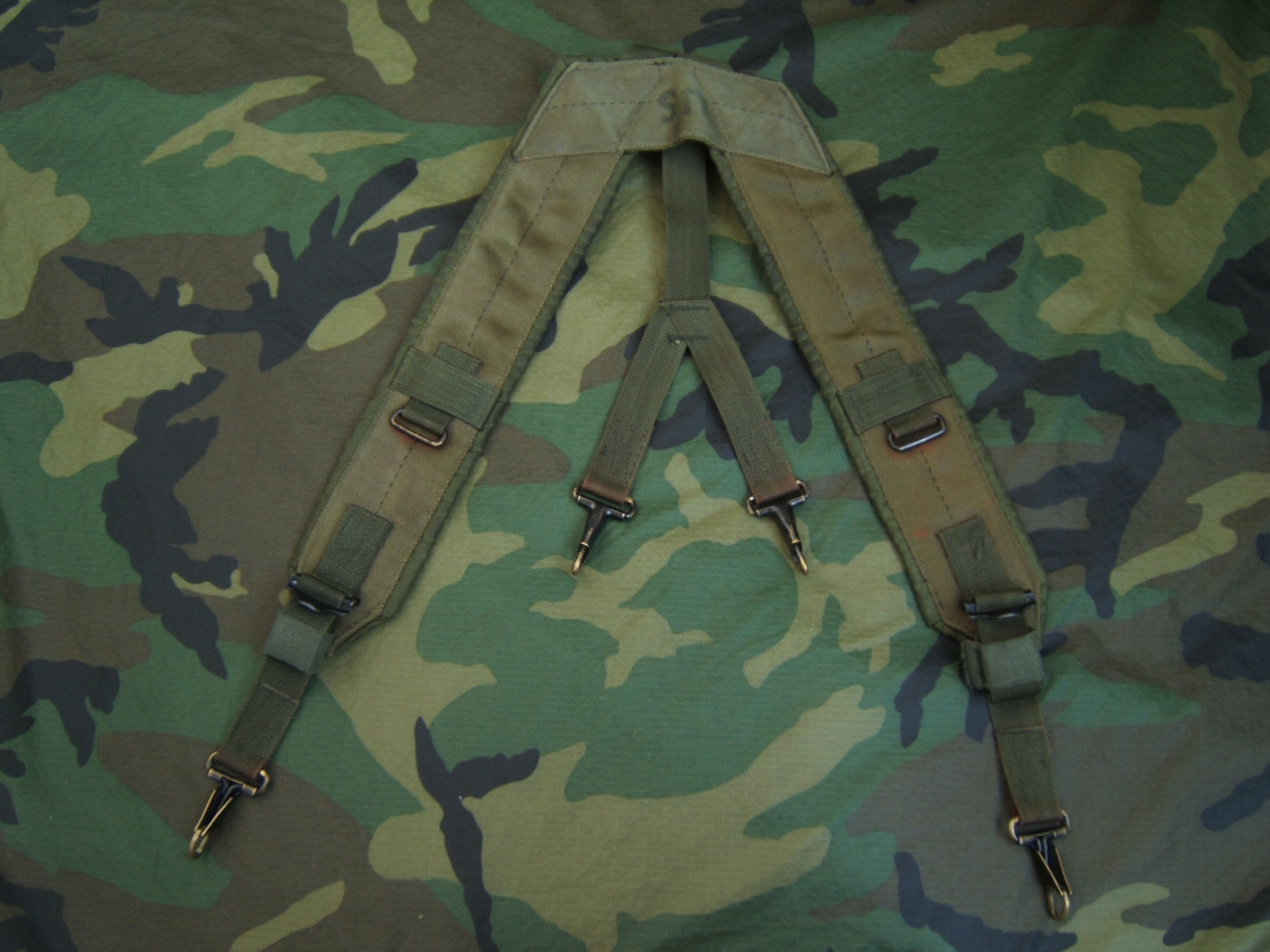
LC-1 individual equipment suspenders

Suspenders, individual equipment belt – The individual equipment suspenders are Y-shaped with three adjusting straps, and four points of attachment to the individual equipment belt or small arms ammunition cases. The shoulder straps are padded with spacer cloth. Each shoulder strap has a web loop and a non-slip buckle on each of the straps in the front and one at the back through which the adjusting straps pass. There are rectangular metal rings located between the web loops and the buckles on the front of the straps. The 1-inch (2.5 cm) wide adjusting straps have snap hooks at one end. The back adjusting strap has an inverted V of which each end has a snap hook. Each of the adjusting straps has a loop around it made of 1-inch (2.5 cm) elastic material. In 1991, the individual equipment suspenders are redesignated LC-2 with no major modifications; minor modifications include the use of steel (instead of brass) for the four snap hooks and the two rectangular rings.

== Existence load components ==
The ALICE system existence load comprises the following components:

- Cover, field pack (NSN 8465-00-001-6478) white
- Field pack, LC-1 medium (NSN 8465-00-001-6480) with liners
- Field pack, LC-1 large (NSN 8465-00-001-6481) with liners
- Frame, field pack, LC-1 (NSN 8465-00-001-6475) black color
- Shelf, cargo support, LC-1 (NSN 8465-00-001-6476)
- Strap, webbing, M-1967 (NSN 8465-00-001-6477) cargo strap
- Strap, webbing, LC-1 (NSN 8465-00-269-0480) lower back strap
- Strap, webbing, LC-1 (NSN 8465-00-269-0481) waist strap
- Strap, webbing, LC-1 (NSN 8465-00-269-0482) left shoulder strap with quick release
- Strap, webbing, LC-1 (NSN 8465-00-269-0483) right shoulder strap without quick release
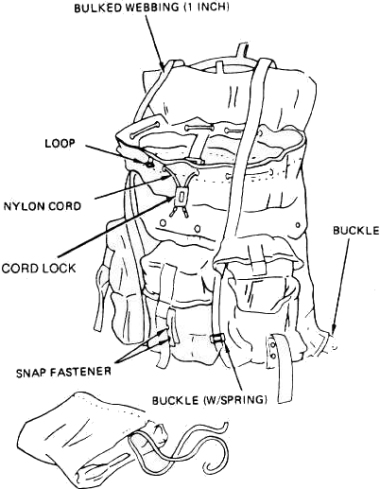
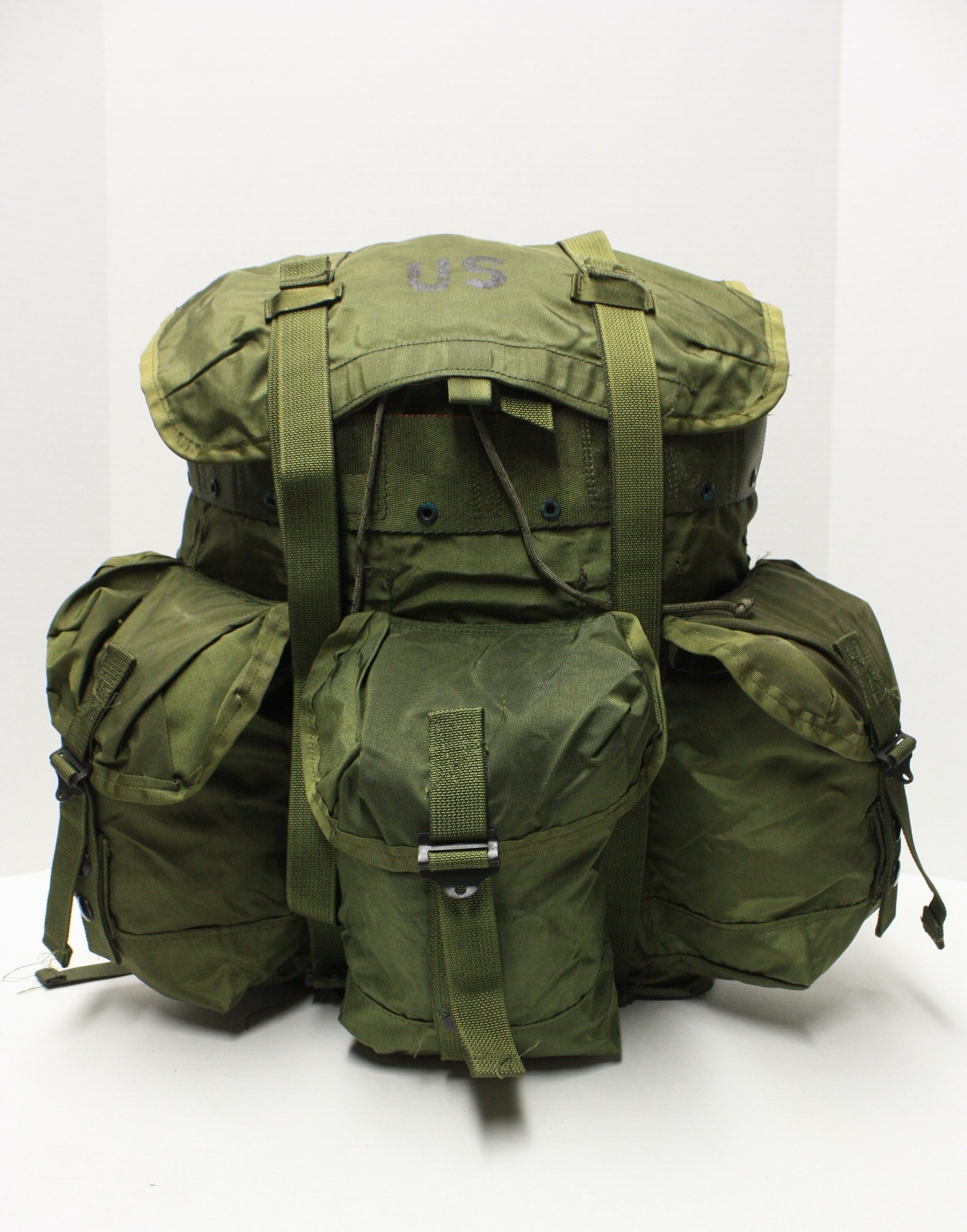
LC-1 field pack – medium

Field pack (medium) – The field pack is made of water repellent treated nylon duck and webbing, spacer fabric, and metal hardware. It can be used with or without the LC-1 field pack frame. The main compartment closes by means of a drawstring secured by a plastic cord clamp. A radio pocket is located against the back on the inside. The size of the pack may be decreased for smaller loads by means of three para-cord ties, stitched to the inside bottom of the pack, and three metal D-rings located directly below the internal radio pocket. Three pockets on the outside, with strap and buckle adjustable closures and with snap fasteners for quick access, are provided for miscellaneous items. The top flap has a pocket with a hook and pile fastener tape sealed closure. Equipment hangers are located above each outside pocket and on each side. Drainage eyelets are provided in the bottom of the main compartment and the outside pockets. An envelope pocket is located at the top, back of the pack and padded with spacer cloth, into which the field pack frame is inserted when the field pack is used on the field pack frame. Buckles and straps at each side near the bottom are used for anchoring the field pack to the field pack frame. Two rectangular wire loops located at the top back of the field pack and D-rings on each side at the bottom of the field pack are used to provide shoulder strap attachment when the field pack is carried without the field pack frame. A waterproof bag is supplied for the main compartment and each of the three outside pockets for keeping equipment dry.

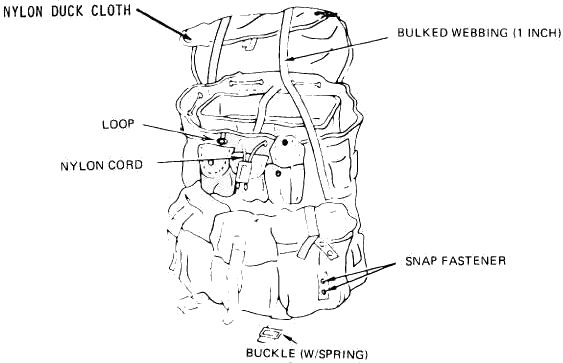
LC-1 field pack – large

Field pack (large) – The construction and materials in the large field pack are similar to the medium field pack with the differences being: it is much larger in size; the center outside pocket is larger than the other two main outside pockets; and the addition of three small outside pockets above the larger pockets. The large field pack MUST be used with the LC-1 field pack frame.

Frame, field pack – The field pack frame is used as a mount for either the medium field pack or the large field pack. The frame, when requisitioned, comes with all straps. The frame is of aluminum construction.

Shelf, cargo support – The cargo support shelf is used to support bulky loads such as water, gasoline, and ammunition cans, field rations, and radios. The shelf is of aluminum construction.

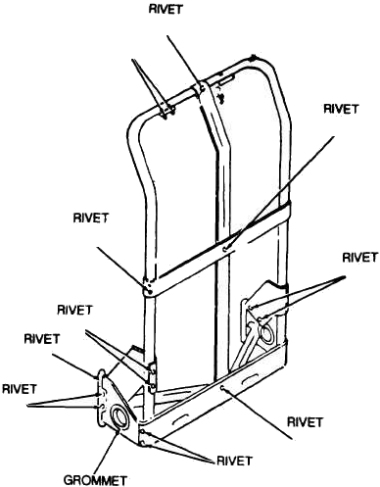
LC-1 field pack frame

LC-1 cargo support shelf

=== Modifications ===
In 1977, the following existence load equipment items are introduced as replacements after modifications due to defects in the original equipment's design:

- Field pack, LC-2 medium (NSN 8465-01-019-9102) with new buckles and no liners
- Field pack, LC-2 large (NSN 8465-01-019-9103) with new buckles and no liners
- Frame, field pack, LC-2 (NSN 8465-01-073-8326) aluminum, green color
- Strap, webbing, LC-2 (NSN 8465-01-075-8164) lower back strap and waist strap
- Strap, webbing, LC-2 (NSN 8465-01-151-2891) frame attaching strap
- Strap, webbing, LC-2 (NSN 8465-01-078-9282) right shoulder strap with quick release

== History and development ==
The ALICE system is the result of the LINCLOE (lightweight individual clothing and equipment) program that began in 1967, and terminated with the adoption of the ALICE system on 17 January 1973. The goal of the individual equipment portion of the LINCLOE program was to develop a lightweight load-carrying system in an effort to lighten a combat soldier's overall load.

=== 1965–1967 ===
==== Improvement studies ====
Based principally on the conclusions and recommendations of A Study To Reduce The Load Of The Infantry Combat Soldier, 1962 and A Study To Conserve Energy Of The Combat Infantryman, 1964, the Army established a Quantitative Material Requirement (QMR) in 1965 calling for the development of LINCLOE.

On 27 April 1966, the development of the LINCLOE load-carrying equipment (LCE) system began, following the Army Materiel Command Technical Committee (AMCTC) approving the project. Although, 1961 marked the true start of development on lightened LCE, with the development of the lightweight rucksack (FSN 8465–782–3248). The lightweight rucksack was made of nylon fabrics and an aluminum frame, which weighed just 3 pounds (1.4 kg) as compared to the 7.5 pounds (3.4 kg) cotton canvas duck and steel item which it replaced.

==== Experimental nylon M-1956 equipment ====
The development of this lightweight rucksack led to an informal inquiry by officers of the infantry community as to the possibility of reducing the weight of the M-1956 load-carrying equipment (LCE).

As a result of this interest, in 1962 the Army produced a set of LCE, substituting the cotton canvas duck with available nylon materials. This set of nylon load-carrying equipment weighed just over 3 pounds (1.4 kg) as opposed to the heavier 5 pounds (2.3 kg) that the standard cotton canvas duck equipment weighed.

==== LINCLOE LCE requirements ====
The lightweight rucksack and nylon load-carrying equipment (LCE) formed the basis of the LINCLOE LCE portion of the 1965 quantitative material requirement. Annex A of the quantitative material requirement set a goal of 3.3 pounds (1.5 kg) for the individual load-carrying equipment and 3 pounds (1.4 kg) for the rucksack. Officials decided that the design of the new load-carrying equipment would follow that of the standard load-carrying equipment with material changes from cotton canvas duck to nylon duck and replacement of the brass and steel hardware with aluminum or plastic items.

The design effort went slowly, due to the occupying focus on the design and development of items to meet the requirement of the Vietnam War, although developers initiated projects investigating the feasibility of replacing much of the steel and brass hardware with aluminum or plastic items.

==== Review and approval of M-1967 equipment system ====
On 15 March 1967, an Engineering Concept Review was held at Natick Laboratories. In descriptive terms, the concept that was approved in the meeting was for an individual equipment belt to be supported by individual equipment suspenders, to which could be attached component items such as small arms ammunition cases, water canteen covers, intrenching tool carriers, field first aid dressing cases, etc.

A buttpack pack somewhat larger than the standard M-1961 field pack was proposed. It could be attached for carrying either on the individual equipment belt at the small part of the back, on the shoulders attached to the individual equipment suspenders, or attached to a detachable field pack frame. The field pack frame with shoulder straps and a removable cargo shelf would have been designed to be worn over the individual equipment belt and suspenders.

The result of this meeting was the adoption of the nylon M-1967 modernized load-carrying equipment (MLCE). The proposed field pack design was rejected in the end and a nylon version of the M-1961 field pack was produced instead along with the nylon tropical rucksack (FSN 8465–935–6673).

=== 1968–1969 ===
==== LINCLOE program ====
Even after the adoption of the MLCE in 1967, developments continued under the LINCLOE program. The MLCE was envisioned for use strictly in tropical environments, and the development of a standard load-carrying equipment system to replace all load-carrying equipment systems continued.

During 1968, the LINCLOE program continued to refine the lightweight load-carrying system. A prototype system was designed utilizing some of the existing MLCE components such as the water canteen cover, small arms ammunition cases, and field first aid dressing case. The individual equipment belt buckle was replaced with a plastic version of the Davis quick-release buckle and a new "Vest, combat" was developed to replace the individual equipment suspenders. Teams developed both a small and large field pack utilizing the detachable field pack frame concept that was scrapped in 1967.

On 26 March 1968 at Natick Laboratories, these prototype items were presented at a Design Characteristics Review And Prototype System Review. It was recommended that an Engineering/Service Test [ET/ST] be carried out on this new load-carrying system design with the understanding that any design changes required be accomplished prior to testing and without another design review.

In July 1969, test items previously presented at the 1968 Natick meeting were manufactured by the US Army Support Center in Richmond, Virginia, under the supervision of Natick Laboratories personnel. These items were sent to the United States Army Infantry Board (USAIB), Fort Benning, Georgia; US Army Tropical Test Center (USATTC), Fort Clayton, Panama Canal Zone; US Army Arctic Test Center (USAATC), Fort Greely, Alaska; and the General Equipment Test Activity (GETA), Fort Lee, Virginia.

Some of the test items differed significantly from those presented at the 1968 meeting.

The major changes were as follows:

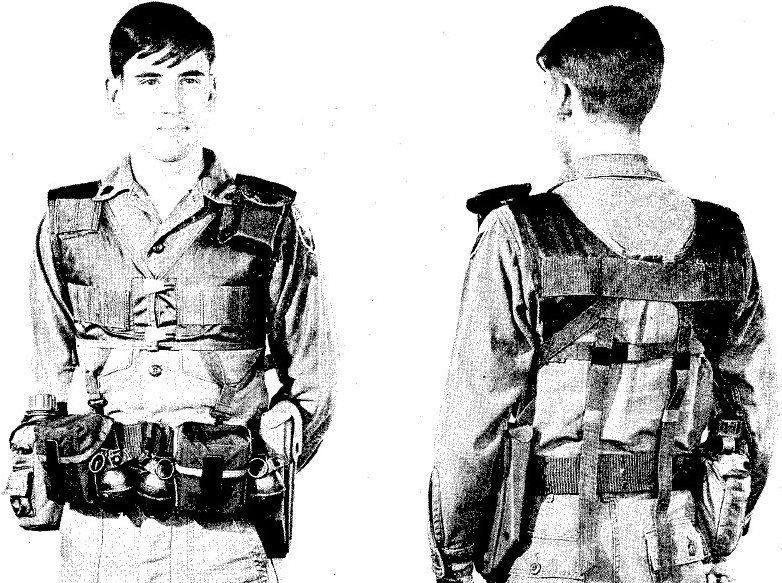
First generation LINCLOE LCE combat load components circa 1968–1969

- Belt, individual equipment – The individual equipment belt was changed by eliminating the center row of eyelets and replacing the single-end hook adjustments at each end with double-end hook adjustments which engaged in the two outside rows of eyelets for size adjustment.
- Vest, combat – The closure devices utilized (originally plastic snap fasteners and hook and loop pile) on the Vest, Combat failed during preliminary testing and were replaced by plastic quick-release fasteners.
- Carrier, intrenching tool – The M-1967 nylon intrenching tool carrier was replaced by a molded one manufactured from ethylene-vinyl acetate (EVA).
- Case, field first aid dressing – The field first aid dressing case utilized a plastic keeper for attachment.
- Cover, water canteen – The water canteen cover utilized plastic keepers for attachment to the equipment belt.

Testing of this new load-carrying system, known as the LINCLOE load-carrying equipment (LCE), began in July 1969 at Fort Benning; September 1969 at Fort Clayton; October 1969 at Fort Greely; and November 1969 at Fort Lee.

On 19 July 1969, the Infantry Team (composed of the Commanding General, Fort Benning; Commanding General of the Infantry School; Commanding Officer of the Combat Developments Command Infantry Agency; and the Commanding Officer of the Infantry Board) met at Fort Benning to discuss improvement of infantry items of individual clothing and equipment. They invited the LINCLOE LCE Project Officer from Natick Laboratories to attend this meeting and present the status of load-carrying equipment items. The Commanding General at Fort Benning was unaware of the effort underway to improve the load-carrying equipment as well as other items of individual clothing and equipment. As a result of the LINCLOE LCE Project Officer's attendance at this meeting, the group established a Non-commissioned Officers (NCO) Board to suggest improvements to load-carrying equipment items.

The NCO Board reviewed the LINCLOE LCE under test as well as the MLCE being provided to troops in Vietnam and arrived at characteristics which they considered desirable. As testing of the LINCLOE LCE continued, a number of failures began to occur mostly to do with closure devices; plastic snap fasteners were still being utilized like those initially utilized on MLCE items. By December 1969, all testing stopped for re-evaluation of the components of the new load-carrying system.

=== 1970–1971 ===
In January 1970, the Infantry Board completed the evaluation of the first-generation load-carrying equipment.

On 17 March 1970, they held a conference at Fort Benning to review the results of the evaluation. They discussed each item evaluated, and agreed as to the acceptable changes to each load-carrying equipment item. They also agreed that the test of the first-generation LINCLOE LCE should be stopped and new items be designed to reflect the characteristics developed as a result of the evaluations by the NCO Board and Infantry Team.

About a month later, 15 April 1970, a letter to US Army Materiel Command from US Army Combat Developments Command describes the next generation of LINCLOE LCE for service testing based on the agreements of the recent 17 March 1970 meeting.

The following items were recommended when modified as indicated:

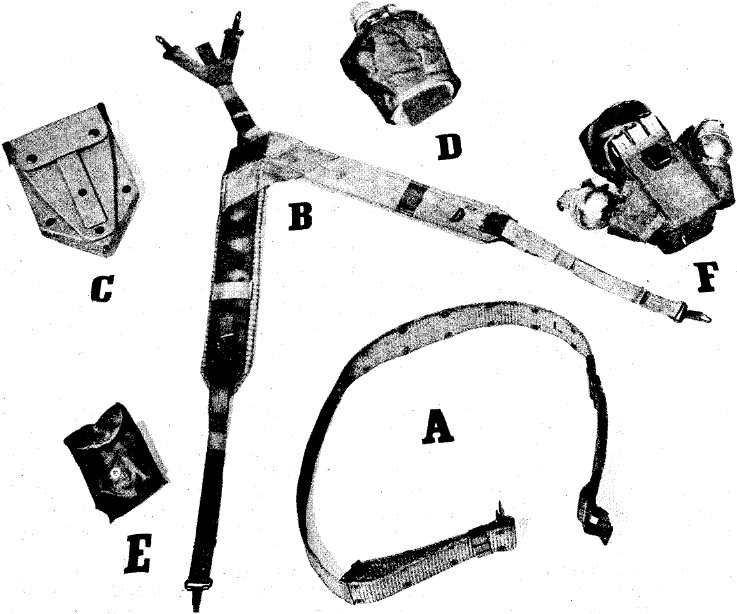
Second generation LINCLOE LCE combat load components circa 1970–1971

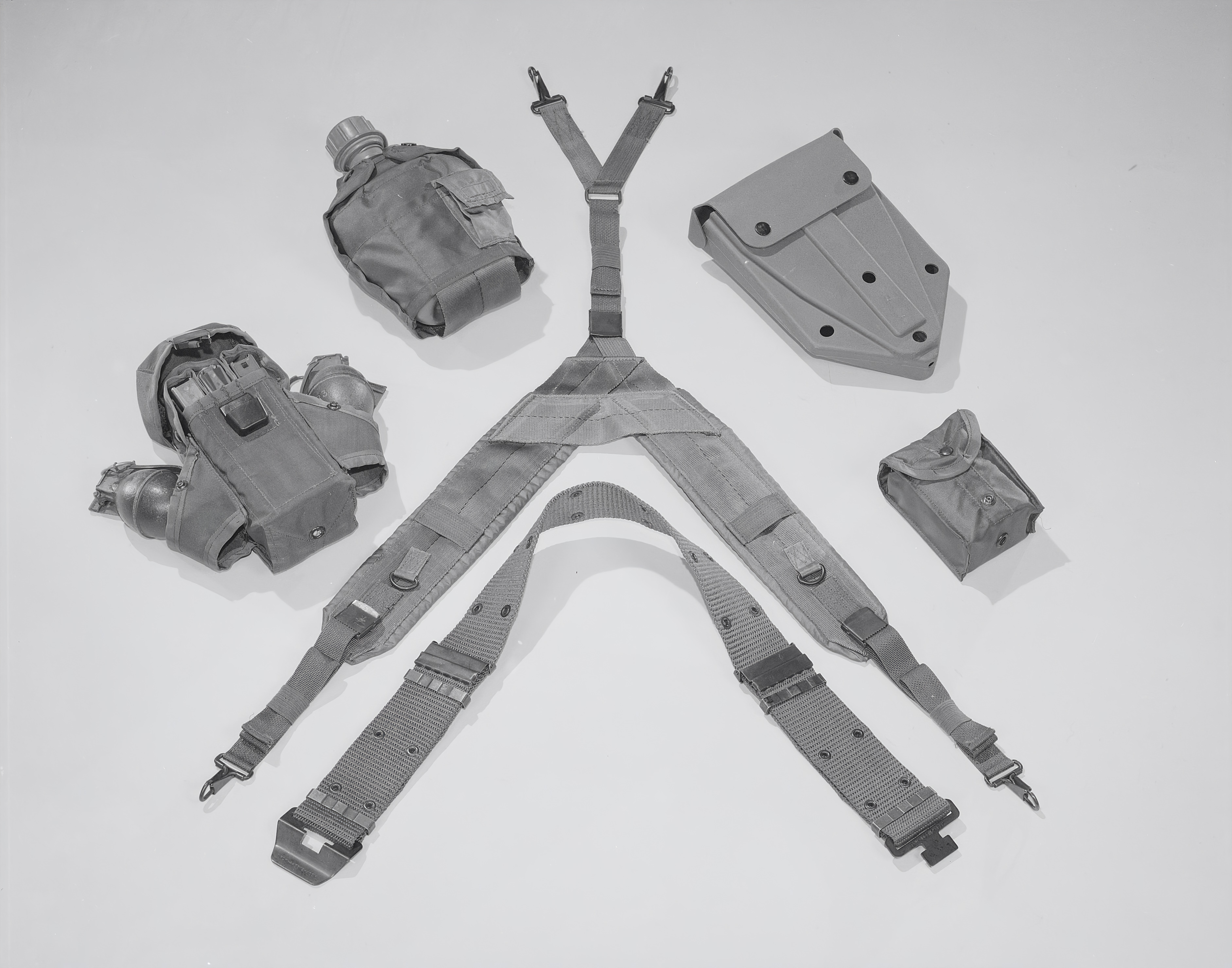
Second generation LINCLOE LCE combat load in November 1970

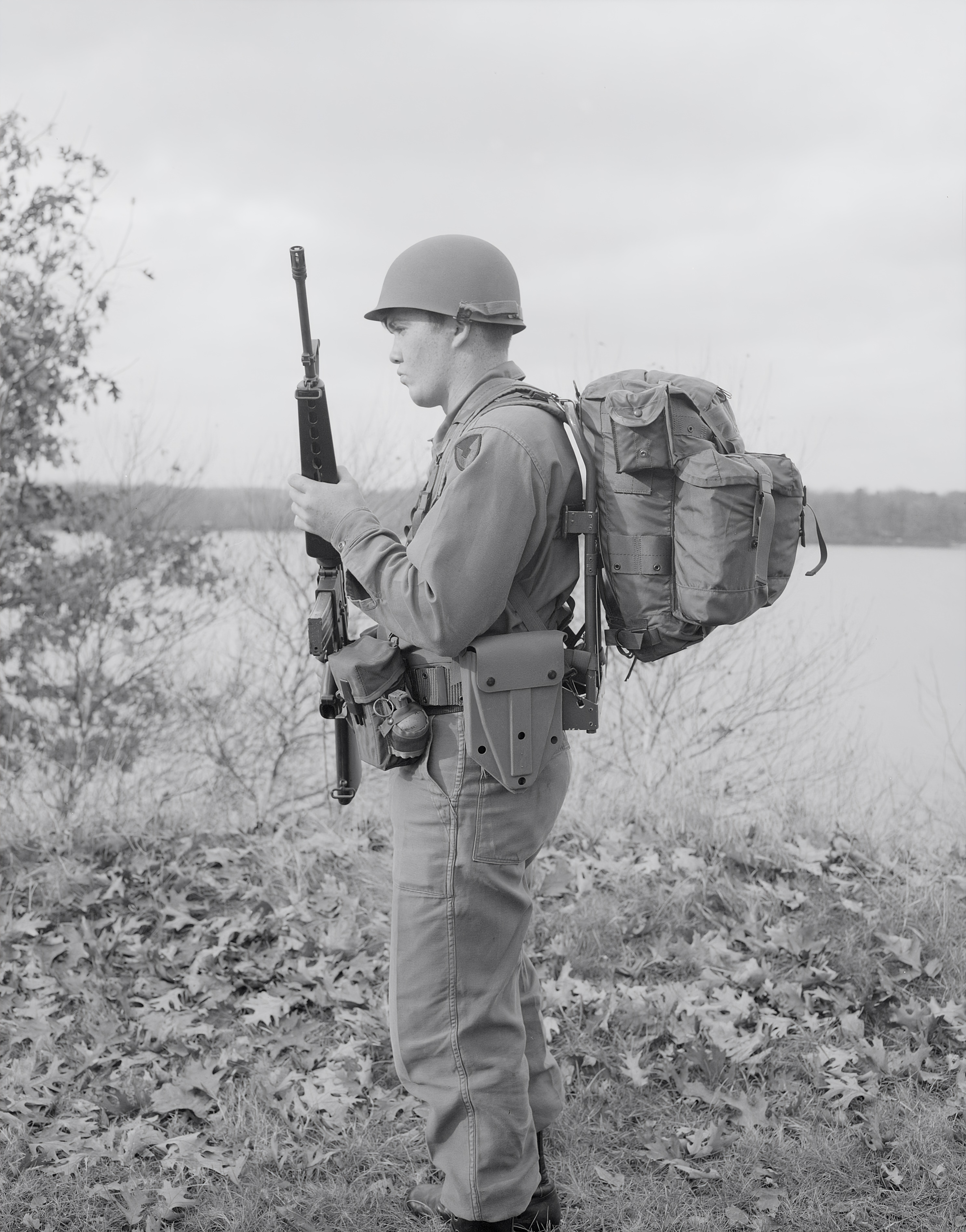
Demonstration of second generation LINCLOE LCE in November 1970

- Belt, individual equipment – Design as furnished for evaluation with two (one upper and one lower) rows of eyelets and aluminum quick-release buckle. Also with new clinch-buckle size adjustment system.
- Suspenders, individual equipment belt – M-1967 design but with single support/attachment strap in rear. The vest, combat was eliminated from the program due to being over-complicated and prone to failure.
- Carrier, intrenching tool – molded EVA version but utilizing metal snap closures (instead of plastic).
- Case, field first aid dressing – Enlarged version of the M-1967 design capable of holding two field first aid dressings. Also with metal snap closures (instead of plastic).
- Case, small arms ammunition – M-1967 30-round cartridge magazine design but with support strap replaced with eyelet (to attach to individual equipment suspenders). Also internal divider flaps to keep cartridge magazines separated and different method of attaching hand grenades to the sides.
- Cover, water canteen – M-1967 design but utilizing metal snap closures (instead of plastic). Also without pile lining and openings at the bottom to allow for drainage.

Also proposed in the letter were improved versions of the small and large field pack and field pack frame.

During April and June 1970, teams fabricated a prototype system of load-carrying equipment as described in the 15 April 1970 letter. They presented this set of load-carrying equipment to the NCO Board and Infantry Team for review at Fort Benning on 18–19 June 1970.

On 29 July 1970, representatives from the US Army Combat Developments Command and the LINCLOE LCE Project Officer met at Natick Laboratories and drafted a revision of the LINCLOE LCE Quantitative Material Requirement as it pertained to load-carrying equipment including the characteristics for each individual item. This was based primarily on the outcome of the 17 March 1970 meeting with one major exception. The LINCLOE LCE Project Officer added a third field pack to the system. This was the medium field pack with a bag made from the nylon tropical rucksack, modified to meet the NCO Board requirements for a small field pack by adapting it to be worn on the back with or without a field pack frame.

On 5 October 1970, a design characteristics review and prototype system review was held at Natick Laboratories concerning the new LINCLOE LCE. The group approved the Quantitative Material Requirement for the new second-generation LINCLOE LCE with minor changes.

Natick Laboratories fabricated fifteen sets of the second-generation LINCLOE LCE and shipped them to Army European Headquarters (USAREUR) on 17 November 1970 for evaluation. In December 1970, the US Army Support Center, Virginia fabricated an additional 300 sets of the second-generation LINCLOE LCE and sent them to Natick Laboratories for assembly and shipment to test sites.

Seven months later in August 1971, the test sets were sent to Fort Benning, Fort Greely, Fort Devens, and, as requested, to the Marine Corps at Quantico. Pre-test inspections uncovered a number of deficiencies with the field packs, which were returned to Natick Laboratories for modification. Two months later, the modified items went back to the test sites in November 1971, and the service test began.

=== 1972–1973 ===
By March 1972, so many deficiencies and shortcomings had developed in the load-carrying equipment that the US Army Test and Evaluation Command (USATECOM) requested for the test at Fort Benning to be suspended until the test items could be repaired or replaced. Officials held a meeting at Fort Benning on 6 April 1972 to discuss the failures. In their discussions, they agreed that Natick Laboratories would take action to correct the problems for a possibility of the tests resuming on 9 June 1972, two months following the deficiencies meeting.

In the way of deficiencies, most were found on the field packs. An additional concern was that of the small arms ammunition cases. Users asked that the inner flaps on the small arms ammunition cases be removed as they impeded the rapid removal of magazines. Developers replaced these with simple strips of nylon fabric to divide the cartridge magazines. At some point during 1971, the Marine Corps found that the small arms ammunition case with the full divider flaps was acceptable and then initiated acceptance procedures. On 31 January 1972, the Army issued military specification MIL-C-28981, and these small arms ammunition cases were type classified (approved for production and fielding) and assigned the Federal Stock Number 8465–464–2084. The Defense Support Agency (DSA) issued contracts for the item, scheduled for fiscal year 1973.

Natick Laboratories completed the modifications of the test items, and then transported them by military aircraft to Fort Benning on 1 June 1972. However, testing did not resume until two days later, on 3 July 1972. Testing finished one and a half months later, on 18 August 1972, and the final report was received on 24 November 1972. As a result of the test, the Infantry Board recommended that no additional development effort be expended on the load-carrying equipment system. On 31 October 1972, representatives from Natick Laboratories visited Fort Benning to discuss the problems which appeared during the testing of each item and to arrive at a decision whether to continue development of each item.

Prior to these final meetings the LINCLOE LCE components had been type classified and assigned federal stock numbers as follows:

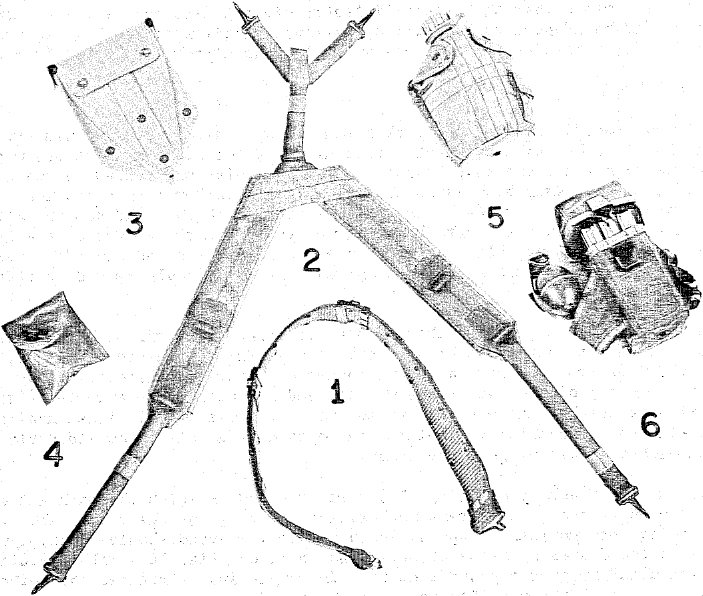
LINCLOE LCE/ALICE combat load components circa December 1972

- Belt, individual equipment – 8465-001-6487 (large), 8465-001-6488 (medium)
- Carrier, intrenching tool – 8465–001–6474
- Case, field first aid dressing – 8465–001–6473
- Case, small arms ammunition – 8465–001–6482
- Cover, water canteen – 8465–001–6472
- Suspenders, individual equipment belt – 8465–001–6471

The three field packs were also type classified and assigned federal stock numbers:

- Field pack – 8465-001-6479 – small
- Field pack – 8465-001-6480 – medium
- Field pack – 8465-001-6481 – large

After the final meetings, the group proposed the following changes prior to manufacture:

- Belt, individual equipment – Adopted; but with the standard ball buckle. The test item had been equipped with the Davis two-piece aluminum buckle which provided a quick-release capability.
- Suspenders, individual equipment belt – Adopt a set of individual equipment suspenders similar in design to those tested, but modified to increase adjustability by four inches.
- Carrier, intrenching tool – Adopted
- Case, field first aid dressing – The panel rejected the test item and retained the M-1967 version. The adopted characteristics required that this item to be of sufficient size to carry two field first aid dressings. The panel determined that the M-1967 version, that accommodated one field first aid dressing, was acceptable.
- Case, small arms ammunition – The group adopted the small arms ammunition case as tested without the internal divider flaps.
- Cover, water canteen – The group rejected the test item and retained the M-1967 nylon water canteen cover modified by stiffening the closing flaps so that they would not collapse and interfere with the insertion of the water canteen; to enlarge the water canteen cover somewhat for easier insertion and extraction of the water canteen cup; to add a reinforcement band to the inside of the water canteen cover to help prevent the lip of the water canteen cup from rubbing through; and add a grommet drain hole in the bottom. As requested by the NCO Board, the test cover was made without a pile liner, whose purpose was to provide evaporative cooling, and with openings in the bottom to provide better drainage and to make extraction of the water canteen cup easier. However, the test indicated that the pile liner added shape to the water canteen cover and kept it from collapsing completely when empty, making insertion of the water canteen cup much easier. The tests also determined that the openings in the bottom constituted a camouflage hazard as the metal of the water canteen cup bottom was exposed.

The group accepted the medium and large field packs with minor modifications but rejected the small field pack as unnecessary. Retesting of modified medium and large field packs were conducted at Fort Benning during 27 November through 18 December 1972. The testing showed that deficiencies and shortcomings of the field packs previously reported had been corrected.

=== Acceptance and initial naming ===
At Natick Laboratories, the formal development acceptance review (DEVA) for LINCLOE LCE passed on 17 January 1973. The panel members agreed, by consensus, that the components be type classified as Standard A. After acceptance, the equipment system was designated M-1972 lightweight load-carrying equipment (LLCE).

The Defense Support Agency (DSA) began issuing contracts for M-1972 equipment in fiscal year 1974, which began 1 July 1973. After the DSA issued the initial contracts, the M-1972 system was re-designated as All-purpose Lightweight Individual Carrying Equipment (ALICE), and as such, the long-time practice of using year-model designations for load-carrying equipment officially ceased.

== Current ==
=== United States ===
ALICE was succeeded by Generation I and II MOLLE equipment.

The ALICE system has been phased out of all US Army active and reserve (USAR and Army National Guard) units. Basic and advanced individual training units, to include OCS, ROTC, and USMA (West Point), also use current MOLLE equipment.

The US Navy and US Air Force use ALICE gear for ground personnel as well, although the USAF is phasing out ALICE in favor of MOLLE.

The Marine Corps still issues the medium ALICE pack for some radio operators. Both the medium and large variant can still be found with NROTC units (who train Marine officers in addition to Navy officers). Active-duty training units (e.g. Recruit Training, School of Infantry, Officer Candidates School, The Basic School) and deployable units have switched over to the new Family of Improved Load Bearing Equipment (USMC pack) or the slightly older improved load bearing equipment (ILBE) system. MARSOC makes extensive use of ALICE or modified ALICE (MALICE) packs for ruck-running events in training (Assessment and Selection, Initial Training Course, and Special Operations Training Course), pre-deployment evaluations, and the Raider Games.

=== Other users ===
ALICE packs were largely distributed to US allied factions and nations in Central and South America.

Afghanistan, Georgia and Iraq received ALICE packs as part of military aid in the 21st century.

Iranian Military and Law Enforcement still make heavy use of ALICE, MLCE and LCE gear, but are switching to MOLLE equipment (specifically IRGC and Army special forces) because of being more modular and, are also switching to IIFS for being more lightweight.

== Users ==
=== Current ===
- Argentina
- Australia
- Brazil
- Colombia
- Cyprus
- Dominican Republic
- El Salvador
- Georgia
- Honduras
- Iran
- Iraq
- Italy
- Jamaica
- Kuwait
- Latvia
- Liberia
- Luxembourg
- Mexico
- New Zealand
- Nicaragua
- Panama: Panama Defense Forces soldiers wore locally produced copies.
- Paraguay
- Peru
- Philippines
- Saudi Arabia
- Thailand

=== Former ===
- Islamic Republic of Afghanistan
- United States

== See also ==
- M-1956 load-carrying equipment, standard equipment system that was replaced by ALICE
- M-1967 modernized load-carrying equipment (MLCE), an experimental predecessor equipment system
- Individual integrated fighting system (IIFS), a modernized system and proposed replacement
- Modular lightweight load-carrying equipment (MOLLE), a newer modular system used by the US Army
- Improved load-bearing equipment (ILBE), issued to USMC in the 2010s
