= D. mollis =

D. mollis may refer to:

- Dimorphandra mollis, the fava d'anta, a tree species found in Brazil
- Dalea mollis, a flowering plant species native to the deserts where Mexico meets the US states of California and Arizona

== See also ==
- Mollis (disambiguation)
