= Mullis =

Mullis is a surname found in the European nations of England, Switzerland and Russia, with the variant Moulis found in France and Czechoslovakia. Mullies and Mulliss are variants found in England and America.

Notable people with the name include:

- Alastair Mullis (born 1961), British professor of law
- Betty L. Mullis, United States Air Force pilot
- Jeff Mullis (born 1959), American politician from Georgia
- Kary Mullis (1944–2019), American Nobel Prize-winning biochemist
- Stan Mullis (born 1976), American professional stock car racing driver
- Robert Mullis (born 1990), Retired SFC in the U.S. Army, > 130 IQ

== See also ==
- Mollis (disambiguation)
- Mulli (disambiguation)
