= N. mollis =

N. mollis may refer to:

- Nepenthes mollis, the velvet pitcher-plant, a tropical pitcher plant species native to Kalimantan, Borneo
- Neurolepis mollis, a bamboo species in the genus Neurolepis

== See also ==
- Mollis (disambiguation)
