= Little Mill =

Little Mill or Lille Mølle may refer to:

== Places ==
- Little Mill, Monmouthshire, Wales
- Littlemill, Nairnshire, Scotland

== Windmills ==
=== Denmark ===
- Lille Mølle, Christianshavn
- Lille Mølle, Lille Skensted, a windmill in Denmark

=== United Kingdom ===
- Little Mill, Cross in Hand, a windmill in East Sussex
- Little Mill, Thorpe le Soken, a windmill in Essex
- Little Mill, Bethersden, a windmill in Kent
- Little Mill, Frindsbury, a windmill in Kent
- Little Mill, Sheerness, a windmill in Kent

== Other uses ==
- Littlemill (whisky distillery), a whisky distillery in Scotland
- Little Mill railway station, a closed railway station Berwickshire, Scotland
- Little Mill, East Peckham, a watermill on the River Bourne, Kent
