= Mulli =

Mulli may refer to:

== Places ==
- Mulli, Peru (Cerro Molle); a mountain
- Mulli, Tunisia (episcopal bishopric titular see diocese) see Catholic Church in Tunisia
- Mulli, Palakkad District, Kerala, India; a hill station, see List of hill stations in India

== People ==
- Charles Mulli (born 1949), Kenyan entrepreneur
- Henry Nzioka Mulli (1927-2015), Kenyan diplomat
- Ueli Mülli, Swiss curler

== See also ==
- Mullis (surname)
- Molle (disambiguation)
