= MOLLE =

Load-bearing equipment and backpacks used by the United States Army

MOLLE and MOLLE II
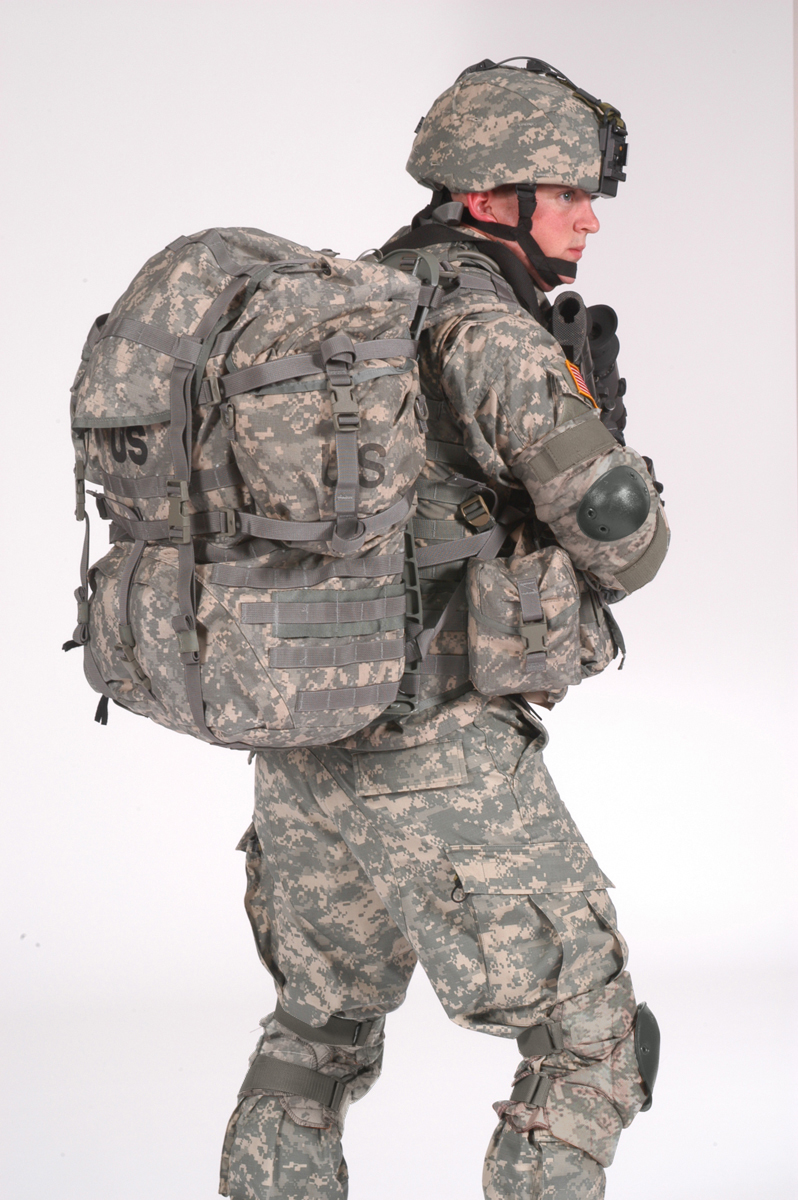
- A US Army soldier wearing MOLLE II gear in Universal Camouflage Pattern
- Type: Load-carrying equipment
- Place of origin: United States

Service history
- In service: 2001–present
- Used by: US Army (2001–present); US Marines (2001–2009); US Navy; US Air Force
- Wars: Global War on Terrorism; War in Afghanistan; Iraq War

Production history
- Designer: US Army Soldier Systems Center
- Manufacturer: Specialty Defense Systems
- Variants: MOLLE (aka MOLLE I); MOLLE II

Modular Lightweight Load-carrying Equipment, or MOLLE (/ˈmɒli/ MOL-ee), is the current generation of load-bearing equipment used by the United States Army.

MOLLE equipment uses Pouch Attachment Ladder System (PALS)-type webbing – rows of heavy-duty nylon stitched onto the gear – to attach pouches. This method has found use on civilian gear, and as a result, the term 'MOLLE' is used outside the military for any equipment generally using PALS-type webbing. The system's modularity results from the PALS allowing for the attachment of various compatible pouches and accessories. This method of attachment has become a de facto standard for modular tactical gear, replacing the All-purpose Lightweight Individual Carrying Equipment (ALICE) clips and webbing used in the earliest modular vest systems.

The MOLLE system replaced the aging ALICE equipment, adopted in 1973, and the Individual Integrated Fighting System (IIFS) used since 1988 in US Army and Marine Corps service.

== Background ==
Even prior to the introduction of MOLLE, another lightened system of load-carrying equipment had been developed. Known as the Individual Integrated Fighting System (IIFS) and also TLBV, it intended to replace the older All-purpose Lightweight Individual Carrying Equipment (ALICE). The IIFS load-bearing vests (rifle and 40mm grenadier configurations) had their origins in the vests used by US Navy SEALS and other special operations forces in Vietnam. Though the IIFS did not live up to its expected purpose, it did lay the groundwork for future equipment.

=== ALICE and IIFS packs ===
In 1988, the US Army adopted a new internal frame pack system, a subsystem in IIFS. The design was based on commercial backpacks modified for military use with the addition of a special fighting vest and a detachable patrol pack. The original focus was to develop a load-carrying system for use in cold weather. However, in the end, the US Army decided the new internal frame pack would be the replacement for the external framed All-purpose Lightweight Individual Carrying Equipment (ALICE) system. Production and distribution started in 1990 but by 1993 it was evident that the new internal frame pack was unacceptable to a large number of combat personnel.

Although a key problem with the internal frame was durability due to poor manufacturing, the IIFS pack system was also judged to have some basic design flaws. Based on a survey of users by the US Army Training and Doctrine Command (TRADOC), soldiers claimed the pack was too hot against the back in warm climates, and was unstable and uncomfortable when heavily loaded. While many of the features of the system were liked (e.g., the patrol pack, and capacity of the main pack), it was judged not to meet the overall requirements of the Army. In spite of this rejection, most units surveyed (6 of 9), still favored having both load-carrying systems: the ALICE for warm and temperate climates, and the internal frame system for cold weather operations.

== Development ==
An early prototype of a modular system was under development before the call for a front-end analysis for a new & improved military load carrying system in 1994. This early prototype was later refined based on the front-end analysis.

=== Front-end analysis ===
In March 1994, the Training and Doctrine Command (TRADOC) System Manager for the Soldier, the Program Manager Soldier (PM-Soldier), and the Marine Corps Systems Command issued a joint call for a front-end analysis (FEA) to determine the best design for a load-bearing system for soldiers and marines. The front-end analysis was used in drafting a new user requirements document and initiating the development of a modular load-carrying system.

==== FEA survey ====
Over a period of seven months, questionnaires were distributed to over 2,000 soldiers and marines by the US Army Natick Operational Forces Interface Group (OFIG) during its routine surveys of users of Natick developed food, clothing, shelters, and individual equipment items.

Five US Army posts (Forts Bragg, Campbell, Drum, Hood and Lewis) and two US Marine Corps sites (Camps Mabry and Lejeune) were visited. All those surveyed had experience with the ALICE, and 40 percent also had experience with the recently introduced Individual Integrated Fighting System (IIFS). All tests involved experienced soldiers who evaluated candidate systems during simulated tactical movements in the field and laboratory.

The respondents were given 32 statements about their current load-bearing system and asked to indicate whether they agreed or disagreed, slightly or strongly, with the statement. These statements reflected issues related largely to deficiencies of their legacy system, the ALICE as well as to the recently introduced internal frame system. The respondents were also asked to provide suggestions for future developments of a military load-carrying system.

The FEA survey resulted in 1,844 fully completed questionnaires by soldiers and marines from eight military specialties. Fifty-six percent of the respondents were combat infantrymen, 14% combat engineers, 8% medics and the remainder were communications, chemical, mechanic, and other support specialists.

=== Testing and evaluation (1997–2000) ===
In early tests, MOLLE was evaluated alongside other candidate modular systems, whereas in later tests, MOLLE was either tested alone or with standard ALICE. In all tests, volunteers were asked to rate MOLLE against their current LBE, i.e., the ALICE. Upon completing the individual questionnaire, the team was brought together for group discussion. In most tests, the field actions and group discussions were video recorded for later review and analysis.

MOLLE was developed at Natick Labs in the mid-1990s, following the introduction of IIFS. Army leadership believed that the PALS system now presented an opportunity to completely change the way equipment was made. It was conceived as a lighter and more durable system for carrying equipment, and would lighten the soldier's load.

== Fielding ==
The MOLLE system was introduced in 1997, but did not see widespread issue until after the September 11 attacks in 2001, primarily by U.S. troops serving in Afghanistan and Iraq.

MOLLE entered full rate production in August 2001. Fielding began in October 2001.

== Criticisms ==
Early criticisms of the MOLLE system emerged, particularly from the Army. Many of these criticisms have centered on the sustainment-load pack and frame, due to the external plastic frame being too fragile and subject to breaking in the field (since mitigated), that the zippers have a tendency to burst when stuffed full and that the pack's straps lack sufficient length to be used with bulky body armor.

The first generation of this system used a ball and socket joint between the frame and rucksack belt (which in itself formed the waistbelt of the MOLLE vest). This method led to numerous lower back injuries due to the ball (mounted on the frame) missing the socket on the waistbelt and hurting the user's body. Subsequent redesign of the SDS MOLLE led to the deletion of this feature, with the vest (aka FLC) and ruck/frame becoming separate non-integral items.

== Attachment technique ==
=== Terminology ===
The term 'MOLLE' technically only applies to the individual equipment system (manufactured by Specialty Defense Systems) rather than the PALS (Pouch Attachment Ladder System) webbing that it utilizes. Despite that, 'MOLLE' is often casually used to describe any load bearing system or component in general that utilizes the woven PALS webbing.

Although PALS was proprietary to Natick Labs from 1998 to 2016, most in the contracting and commercial industry of individual equipment had used and continue to use the terms 'MOLLE' and 'PALS' interchangeably.

=== Attaching system ===
Pattern for PALS grid of webbing, consisting of 1-inch (25 mm) tall webbing and gaps, with 1.5-inch (38 mm) wide insert loops (for pouch attachment straps)

The PALS grid is made up of repeating horizontal rows of 1-inch (25 mm) tall webbing spaced 1 inch apart. The stitched lines (specifically bartacks) create a horizontal opening of 1.5 inches (38 mm) through which pouch attachment straps can be fed.

Pouches are attached by aligning the PALS webbing on the platform and the pouch so that the rows interleave with each other and the bartacks are aligned. An anchoring strap on the pouch is then woven through both sets of webbing and secured with a snap fastener at the base. This interwoven and interlocking design keeps the pouch securely in place.

PALS measurements (for 1 inch webbing):

- 1 inch tall webbing
- 1 inch gap, alternating with the prior piece
- 1.5 inch wide insert loops (for pouch attachment straps)

The height of the webbing is 1 inch or 25.4 mm, with a tolerance of ± 1/16 inch or 1.6 mm — equivalent to 0.9375–1.0625 inches (23.81–26.99 mm). In other words, the height of webbing can be off by about half of 1/10th an inch, and still remain within tolerance. In metric, the tolerance is within roughly 1.25 mm on the low end and roughly 2.00 mm on the high end.

The misalignment of divider bartacks in 1.5 inch insert loops is considered acceptable within approx. 1.4–1.6 inches (36–41 mm) wide.

== Components ==
The MOLLE system has several components; a Fighting Load Carrier (FLC) vest, modular pouches/pockets, large rucksack (aka main pack & Sleep System Carrier), assault pack, pack frame, and hydration system.

The modular pouches can carry 30 round ammunition magazines, squad automatic weapon 100 and 200 round magazines, fragmentation grenades, 40mm grenades, 9mm magazines, and 1 quart canteens.

=== List of components ===
Tactical assault panel
The Tactical Assault Panel (TAP) replaces the Fighting Load Carrier (FLC). It is a bib-like chest rig that can be used alone or mounted on the Improved Outer Tactical Vest (IOTV) or Soldier Plate Carrier System (SPCS). The TAP is covered with PALS webbing and storage for up to eight rifle magazines (six 5.56 magazines + two 7.62 NATO magazines, or eight 5.56 magazines).
Assault pack
The Assault Pack is a backpack with 2000 cubic inches (32L) of storage space.
Medium rucksack
The Medium Rucksack is an external frame rucksack with 3000 cubic inches (50L) of storage space. It is designed to be worn over body armor and supports loads up to 60 lbs. It features a large main compartment with internal dividers for items like the hydration system, 60mm mortar rounds, along with a harness for ASIP radios. Two smaller compartments are located outside the main compartment. The pack is adorned in PALS webbing.
Large rucksack
The Large Rucksack is an external frame rucksack with 4000 cubic inches (65L) of storage space. It features a large main compartment with an internal divider between the upper and lower half for organizing loads. It is covered with PALS webbing, and ALICE webbing on the side to support legacy items such as the 2 quart canteen pouch. It is highly adjustable for comfort and load distribution. The MOLLE large rucksack with straps and frame weighs 8 pounds (3.6 kg) when empty.
Hydration bladder
Plastic 3.0 L (100 US fl oz) hydration bladder to supplement the 0.95 L (1 US qt) and 4.7 L (5 US qt) canteens for on-the-go hydration.
Modular pouches
Pouches of various utility that can be attached wherever PALS webbing exists. One type is a "sustainment pouch", which holds three MREs. The various MOLLE pouches are commonly used to carry ammunition, gas masks, batons, flares, grenades, canteens, handcuffs and pepper spray. The custom pouches include PALS-compatible pistol holders, hydration pouches, and utility pouches. These pouches are normally secured through the use of straps, ALICE clips or speedclips.

== See also ==
- Individual integrated fighting system – Lightened load-carrying system of the US military
- Interceptor body armor – Bullet-resistant body armor system
- Personal load carrying equipment – Tactical webbing systems of the British Armed Forces
