= Branco =

Branco ("white" in Portuguese and Galician) may refer to:

== Places ==
- Branco River (disambiguation), various rivers in Brazil
- Cape Branco, on the coast of Paraíba, Brazil
- Branco, Cape Verde, an island
- Morro Branco, Cape Verde, a mountain on the island of São Vicente

== People ==
- Branco, a white Brazilian
- Branco (surname)
- Branco (footballer), Brazilian international footballer Cláudio Ibrahim Vaz Leal (born 1964)
- Branco (rapper), Danish rapper

== Other uses ==
- Il branco, a 1994 Italian drama film

== See also ==
- Castelo Branco (disambiguation)
- Castello Branco (disambiguation)
- Rio Branco (disambiguation)
- Blanco (disambiguation), the Spanish equivalent
- Branko, a South Slavic masculine given name
