= Blanco =

Blanco (white or blank in Spanish) or Los Blancos may refer to:

== People ==
- Blanco (surname)

=== Fictional characters ===
- Blanco Webb, character in the BBC sitcom Porridge
- El Blanco, albino graboid from the Tremor movie and television series

== Places ==
=== United States ===
- Blanco, Monterey County, California, an unincorporated community
- Blanco, Ohio, an unincorporated community
- Blanco, Oklahoma, an unincorporated community
- Blanco, New Mexico, in San Juan County
- Blanco, Texas, a city
- Blanco County, Texas
- Mount Blanco, Texas
- Blanco Canyon, Texas
- Blanco Creek, Texas

=== Other countries ===
- Los Blancos, Salta, Argentina
- Blanco, Dominican Republic, a district in the Hermanas Mirabal province, Dominican Republic
- Blanco, Western Cape, in South Africa

=== Multiple places ===
- Blanco River, places with that name
- Cabo Blanco, places with that name
- Cape Blanco, places with that name
- Río Blanco, places with that name

== Music ==
- Blanco (British rapper), (born 1999), British rapper
- Blanco (singer) (born 2003), Italian singer and rapper
- "Blanco" (song), a 2019 song by J Balvin from Colores (2020)
- "Blanco", a 2009 song by Pitbull, released as the lead single from the Fast & Furious soundtrack
- "Blanco", a 2011 song by Gen Hoshino from the single "Kudaranai no Naka ni"

== Food and drink ==
- Queso blanco, Mexican cheese
- Blanco, a type of tequila

== Sports ==
- Los Blancos, nickname of Real Madrid C.F.
- Los Blancos, nickname of Real Jaén
- Los Blancos, nickname of Atlético Grau

== Other uses ==
- Blanco 1, a nearby open cluster of stars
- Blanco (compound), Joseph Pickering & Sons Ltd, military uniform cleaning paste
- Blanco (film), a Spanish drama film

== See also ==
- Branco, the Portuguese equivalent
- Blanca, the feminine equivalent
