= Blanco (compound) =

Compound used to colour and maintain British load bearing equipment

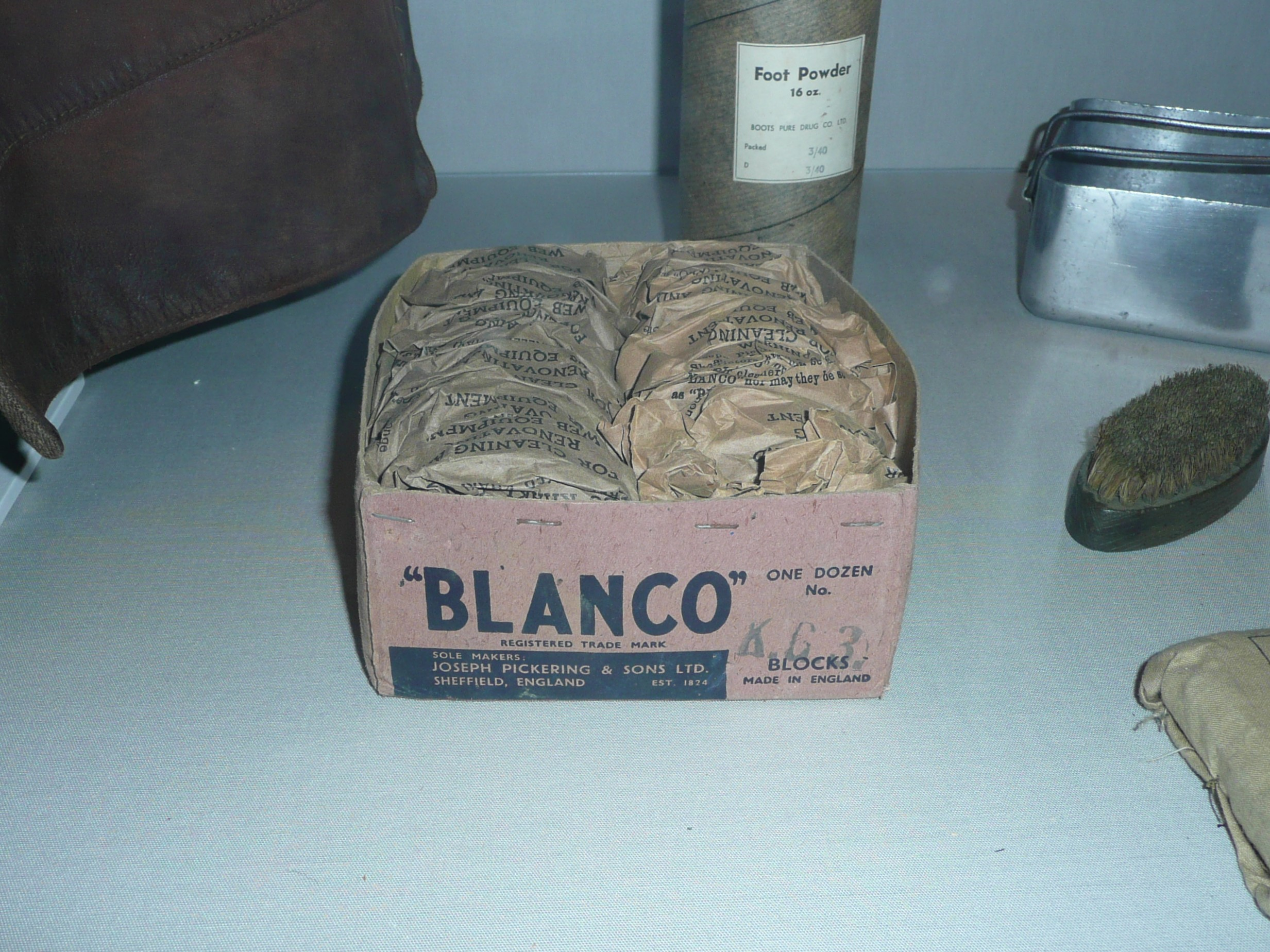
Box of Blanco blocks on display at the Imperial War Museum North

Blanco was a compound used primarily by soldiers throughout the British Empire and later the Commonwealth of Nations from 1880 onwards to clean, colour (and thus camouflage), and waterproof their equipment as well as reduce its stiffness. It was first used by the British Army to whiten Slade–Wallace equipment, and later adapted to coloured versions for use on the 1908 pattern web equipment. Blanco was also used on the 1937 pattern web equipment, though in this case it was primarily used for camouflage purposes since fitting instructions now permitted the use of conventional cleaning methods.

== Description ==
Blanco was initially developed in the 1880s by the family firm of John Needham Pickering, a Volunteer Force member who believed that the firm (then engaged in producing polishing compounds and rouges for the cutlery industry) could come up with an alternative to the traditional white pipe clay that was being used to whiten Slade Wallace equipment at the time. The firm produced a pure white compressed block which, once water was added, could be applied to infantry equipment with a sponge, cloth, or brush. The product was initially sold to the local Hillsborough barracks, with the whitening effect being such that the rest of the British military began to adopt it. By 1888, the product began being referred to by Joseph Pickering & Sons Ltd's tradename of "Blanco". Blanco would take the form of a circular "cake" block throughout its production life, and the method of application (adding water to the block and then rubbing the compound into equipment with a brush) would similarly remain constant. When handling ammunition pouches, only the exterior of the pouch was treated with Blanco. In Canada, the compound was manufactured under the "Capo" tradename. Blanco was not the only cleaning product adopted by the military; for instance, the Mills Equipment Company developed a powdered cleaner for use with its 1908 Pattern Webbing. Post-war experimental rectangular waxy blocks became available with greater waterproofing abilities, but after 1954 Joseph Pickering & Sons Ltd introduced a tinned "polish-type" paste product that did not need the addition of water and could be applied directly from the tin. The product was now referred to as "Pickering's Web Equipment Renovator", but the colour codes remained the same as for the original block versions. Other manufacturers made competing paste products until the 1980s. White Blanco continued to be produced in the traditional block form since a satisfactory paste equivalent could not be developed.

Despite being a required item of equipment, Blanco and its competitors were primarily acquired from NAAFI outlets at the service member's own expense as opposed to being issued from unit stores.

For military applications, Blanco was produced in the original white colour (which, in the era of cotton webbing, was used for ceremonial duties and by regimental and military policemen), "Khaki-Blanco" (later No. 64), British No. 61 Buff (which produced a tan shade compared to Khaki-Blanco), various green shades such as British No. 3 Khaki Green, and blue-grey (used by air force units and consequently known as "RAF Blue"). No black Blanco was produced; where a need for blackened webbing existed, the effect was achieved by a mixture of boot polish and candle grease as in the case of Irish-issue 1908 Pattern Webbing or by boot polish on its own as in the case of Royal Tank Regiment webbing and certain Royal Marine units. (Note: Incidentally, this boot polish method allowed the webbing to have a certain shine for parade purposes and generally worked to preserve webbing material, whereas the need to mix water with Blanco before it could be used meant that the latter had the potential to actually degrade webbing.) For civilian applications (mainly canvas shoes), white, beige "sunburn", grey, champagne, heliotrope, and green Blanco was available.

== Post-war use ==
A post-war Blanco colour adopted by at least one unit of the Parachute Regiment (5th - later renumbered 15th Scottish Battalion) was maroon, using the waxy form of Blanco to give a shiny scuff-resistant finish.

Later webbing equipment such as the 1944 and 1958 patterns was still made from cotton but now came pre-dyed in appropriate camouflage colours (the 1944 and 1958 equipments for instance being dyed in Standard Camouflage Colour (SCC) 19 and SCC 15 respectively) and could be cleaned through conventional methods (indeed, fitting instructions for the 1944 and 1958 equipments specifically forbade the use of Blanco, though the former could have the newer "polish-type" product applied to it); combined with a move away from brass fittings (the 1944 and 1958 equipments for instance using anodised dark green aluminium fittings instead), this reduced the need for Blanco and its complementary product Brasso in maintaining personal military equipment. Even legacy webbing gradually became permanently dyed in one colour or another, as in the case of Australian-issue 1937 Pattern webbing that was commonly (but not universally) dyed green during the Vietnam War. As the use of cotton webbing declined in favour of that made from nylon and other synthetic materials, the need for Blanco and Brasso disappeared entirely outside of certain ceremonial applications such as the whitened 1937 equipment used by the Presidential Motorcycle Escort of the Irish Defence Forces' 2nd Cavalry Squadron.

== Impact ==
The word "Blanco" itself also became used as a verb, as in "to blanco a piece of equipment". The past tense of blanco is usually seen in print as "blancoed".

It appears in the phrase "Bull, Blanco and Brasso" to refer to the methods used to bring uniform to immaculate condition.
