= Slade–Wallace equipment =

Webbing infantry equipment by the British Armed Forces

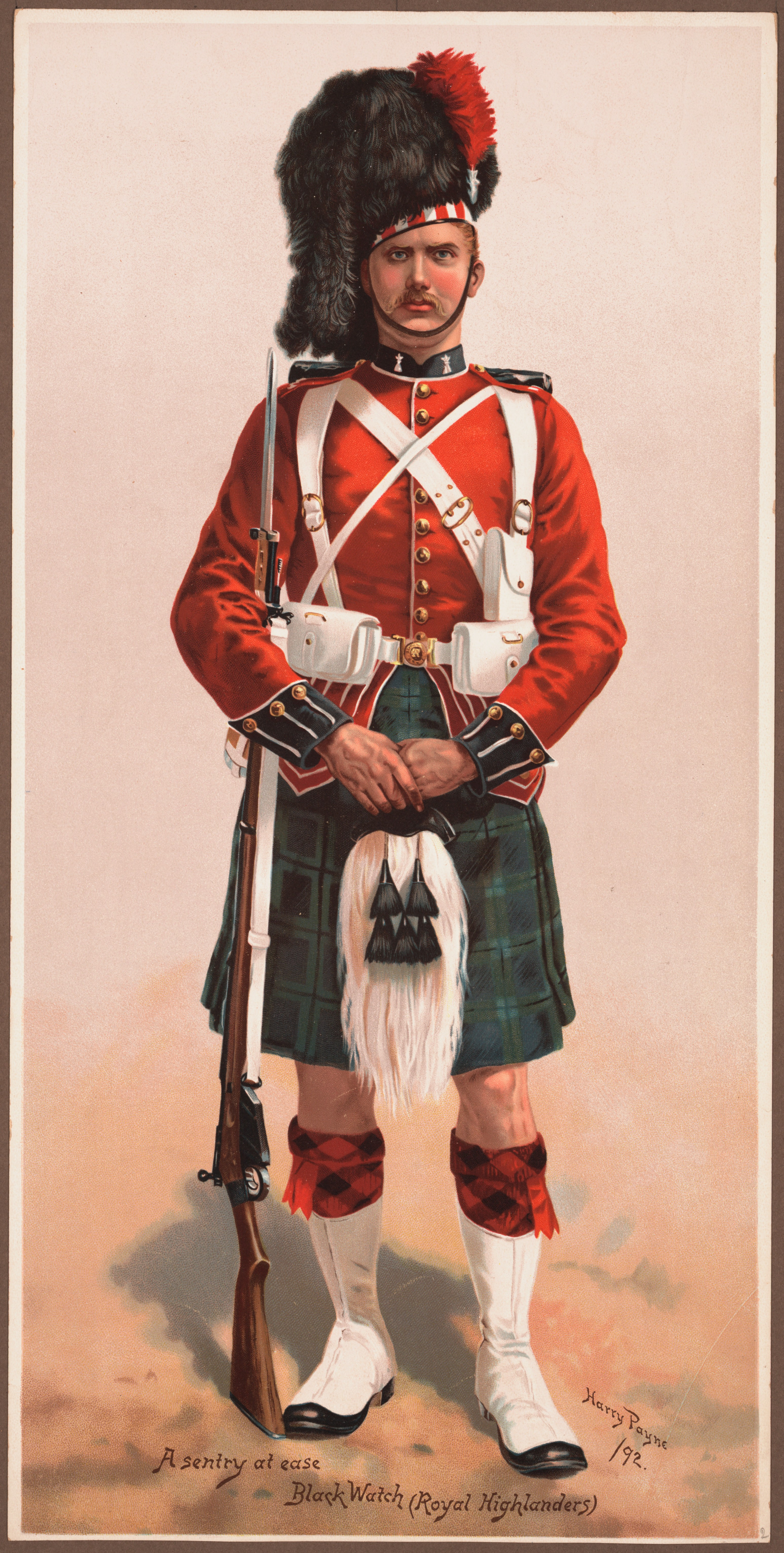
A soldier of the Black Watch (Royal Highlanders) in 1892, wearing whitened Slade–Wallace equipment.

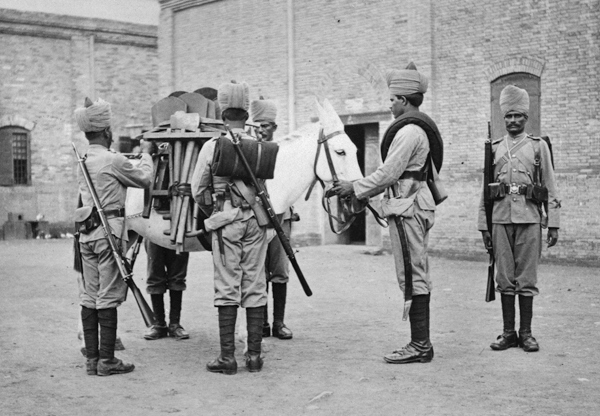
Soldiers of the British Indian Army wearing Slade–Wallace equipment in 1900.

Valise equipment, 1888 pattern, also known as Slade–Wallace equipment, was a leather harness used by the British Armed Forces.

== History ==
The equipment was designed in 1888 by Colonel Slade and Major Wallace for use with the first .303-inch calibre rifles, replacing the valise equipment, pattern 1870, which had entered service in 1871. The Slade–Wallace equipment weighed 25 pounds (11 kg), which was the lightest infantry equipment issued to British troops up to that time. The belts, straps and pouches were made from buff coloured leather, which was whitened with pipe clay; the haversack was made of white canvas, except for rifle regiments which had black.

It was the standard equipment worn by British and Imperial infantry during the Second Boer War. It proved unsuitable for holding modern ammunition, because the pouches had been designed before the introduction of the clip charger which allowed for rapid reloading, and could only accommodate individual rounds. The leather also tended to deteriorate during long periods in the field. After the war, review of the British Army's performance was conducted by the 1903 Royal Commission on the War in South Africa, which heard evidence that the Slade–Wallace equipment was "cumbersome, heavy and badly balanced" and "an absurdity". As a stop-gap measure, the leather 1903 Bandolier Equipment was issued, but it quickly proved to be unsuitable for infantry use and was itself replaced by the 1908 Pattern Webbing.

After the outbreak of the First World War, quantities of Slade-Wallace equipment sets were brought out of storage for the use of recruits in training, and was used on active service by some British colonial troops in the East African campaign. The whitened Slade–Wallace equipment continued to be worn for ceremonial duties by the Brigade of Guards until 1939, and other regiments in that era sometimes wore the whitened belt with Service Dress on formal occasions.

== Description ==
The complete equipment consisted of:

- one waistbelt
- two pouches
- a pair of braces with movable buckles and a keeper
- two greatcoat straps
- one mess tin strap
- one valise

Complementary equipment:

- one reserve magazine pouch

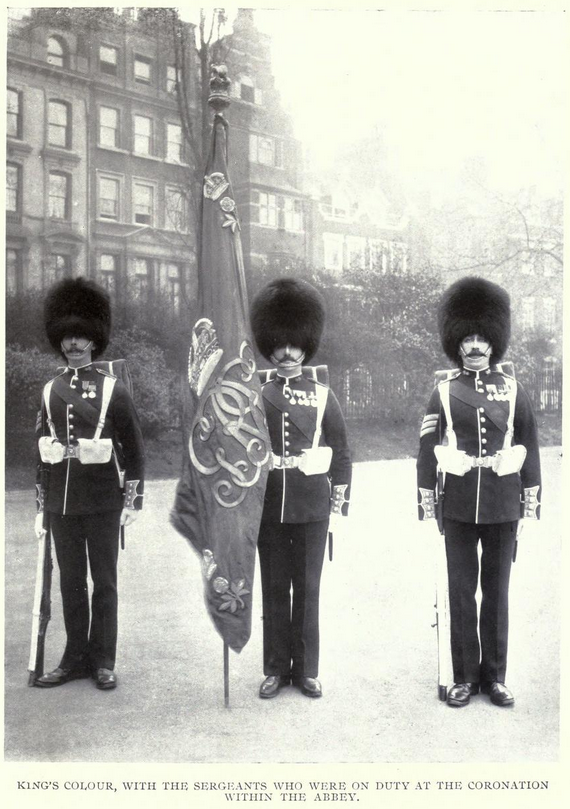
Grenadier Guards wearing whitened Slade–Wallace belt and pouches in 1911.

The leather was coloured according to regiment. It was left buff and then coloured black for rifle regiments, and whitened on the outer surfaces for infantry regiments. A pouch with a reserve magazine (for the Lee-Metford/Lee-Enfield rifle), like a spade, was worn only with the appropriate order. Outside of the marching order, one ammunuition pouch was worn (on the back, or on the right side). The special magazine pouch nominally was a possible element of equipment until the introduction of SMLE No. 1 Mk. I and 1903 Bandolier Equipment, but were not mass issued in practice, with some particular exceptions for some squads and positions. The supply of reserve magazines and pouches for issue as part of standard equipment was stopped in October 1890 and those already supplied to the troops should have been returned to storage (LoC 6235 of 10.03.1890 and LoC 6233 of 10.06.1890). There are examples of what is believed to be a magazine pouch, introduced around 1900, that match the pattern of Slade–Wallace equipment in fittings and materials, but were not strictly included in the set. They appear to have been put into very limited use only.
