= List of presidents of Brazil by age =

This is a list of presidents of Brazil by age. The first table charts the age of each president of Brazil at the time of taking office (first taking office if elected to multiple and consecutive terms), upon leaving office, and at the time of death. Acting presidents who are counted in the official numbering are included, while the military juntas of 1930 and 1969 and presidents-elect who never took office are not. Presidents who are still living have their lifespans and post-presidency timespans calculated through 25 September 2026.

== Age of presidents ==
Age of Brazilian presidents when assuming office

Article 14 of the Constitution of Brazil provides that candidates for president must be at least 35 years old. The average age of Brazilian presidents at the time of taking office is 57 years. The youngest person to become president was Fernando Collor, who took office in 1990 at age 40. He was the first president chosen by direct popular vote after the military dictatorship, and he is also the youngest person ever elected to the office. Nilo Peçanha, who succeeded to the office at age 41 after the death of Afonso Pena in 1909, is the youngest to have become president through succession. The oldest person to take office is Luiz Inácio Lula da Silva, at age 77 years, 2 months, for his nonconsecutive third term in 2023.

Nilo Peçanha was also the youngest president at the end of his tenure, leaving office at age 43 years, 44 days. Delfim Moreira had the shortest lifespan of any president, dying in 1920 at age 51. The oldest president at the end of his tenure is Michel Temer, who left office at age 78 years, 3 months. Venceslau Brás had the longest lifespan of any president, dying in 1966 at age 98 years, 78 days.

Artur da Costa e Silva had the shortest retirement of any president. He died 108 days after a stroke removed him from the exercise of the presidency in 1969. Venceslau Brás's retirement of 47 years, 181 days is the longest in Brazilian presidential history. José Sarney is the oldest of the seven living Brazilian presidents, at 96 years, 154 days. The youngest living former president is Jair Bolsonaro, age 71 years, 188 days.

== Presidential age-related data ==
No.	President	Born	Age at start of presidency	Age at end of presidency	Post-presidency timespan	Lifespan	
No.	President	Born	Age at start of presidency	Age at end of presidency	Post-presidency timespan	Died	Age
1	Deodoro da Fonseca	5 Aug 1827	62 years, 102 days 15 Nov 1889	64 years, 110 days 23 Nov 1891 (Note: Resigned from office)	274 days	23 Aug 1892	65 years, 18 days
2	Floriano Peixoto	30 Apr 1839	52 years, 207 days 23 Nov 1891	55 years, 199 days 15 Nov 1894	226 days	29 Jun 1895	56 years, 60 days
3	Prudente de Morais	4 Oct 1841	53 years, 42 days 15 Nov 1894	57 years, 42 days 15 Nov 1898	4 years, 18 days	3 Dec 1902	61 years, 60 days
4	Campos Sales	15 Feb 1841	57 years, 273 days 15 Nov 1898	61 years, 273 days 15 Nov 1902	10 years, 225 days	28 Jun 1913	72 years, 133 days
5	Rodrigues Alves	7 Jul 1848	54 years, 131 days 15 Nov 1902	58 years, 131 days 15 Nov 1906	12 years, 62 days (Note: Elected again in 1918, but died before taking office for a second term.)	16 Jan 1919	70 years, 193 days
6	Afonso Pena	30 Nov 1847	58 years, 350 days 15 Nov 1906	61 years, 196 days 14 Jun 1909	0 days (Note: Died in office)	14 Jun 1909	61 years, 196 days
7	Nilo Peçanha	2 Oct 1867	41 years, 255 days 14 Jun 1909	43 years, 44 days 15 Nov 1910	13 years, 137 days	31 Mar 1924	56 years, 181 days
8	Hermes da Fonseca	12 May 1855	55 years, 187 days 15 Nov 1910	59 years, 187 days 15 Nov 1914	8 years, 298 days	9 Sep 1923	68 years, 120 days
9	Venceslau Brás	26 Feb 1868	46 years, 262 days 15 Nov 1914	50 years, 262 days 15 Nov 1918	47 years, 181 days	15 May 1966	98 years, 78 days
10	Delfim Moreira	7 Nov 1868	50 years, 8 days 15 Nov 1918	50 years, 263 days 28 Jul 1919	339 days	1 Jul 1920	51 years, 237 days
11	Epitácio Pessoa	23 May 1865	54 years, 66 days 28 Jul 1919	57 years, 176 days 15 Nov 1922	19 years, 90 days	13 Feb 1942	76 years, 266 days
12	Artur Bernardes	8 Aug 1875	47 years, 99 days 15 Nov 1922	51 years, 99 days 15 Nov 1926	28 years, 128 days	23 Mar 1955	79 years, 227 days
13	Washington Luís	26 Oct 1869	57 years, 20 days 15 Nov 1926	60 years, 363 days 24 Oct 1930 (Note: Deposed)	26 years, 284 days	4 Aug 1957	87 years, 282 days
14	Getúlio Vargas	19 Apr 1882	48 years, 198 days 3 Nov 1930	63 years, 193 days 29 Oct 1945	5 years, 94 days (Note: This is the length of Vargas's first (1945–1951) post-presidency, between his two terms in office.)	24 Aug 1954	72 years, 127 days
15	José Linhares	28 Jan 1886	59 years, 274 days 29 Oct 1945	60 years, 3 days 31 Jan 1946	10 years, 361 days	26 Jan 1957	70 years, 364 days
16	Eurico Gaspar Dutra	18 May 1883	62 years, 258 days 31 Jan 1946	67 years, 258 days 31 Jan 1951	23 years, 131 days	11 Jun 1974	91 years, 24 days
17	Getúlio Vargas	19 Apr 1882	68 years, 287 days 31 Jan 1951	72 years, 127 days 24 Aug 1954	0 days	24 Aug 1954	72 years, 127 days
18	Café Filho	3 Feb 1899	55 years, 202 days 24 Aug 1954	56 years, 278 days 8 Nov 1955 (Note: Stepped aside for health reasons; declared impeded by Congress in November 1955.)	14 years, 104 days	20 Feb 1970	71 years, 17 days
19	Carlos Luz	4 Aug 1894	61 years, 96 days 8 Nov 1955	61 years, 99 days 11 Nov 1955	5 years, 90 days	9 Feb 1961	66 years, 189 days
20	Nereu Ramos	3 Sep 1888	67 years, 69 days 11 Nov 1955	67 years, 150 days 31 Jan 1956	2 years, 136 days	16 Jun 1958	69 years, 286 days
21	Juscelino Kubitschek	12 Sep 1902	53 years, 141 days 31 Jan 1956	58 years, 141 days 31 Jan 1961	15 years, 204 days	22 Aug 1976	73 years, 345 days
22	Jânio Quadros	25 Jan 1917	44 years, 6 days 31 Jan 1961	44 years, 212 days 25 Aug 1961	30 years, 175 days	16 Feb 1992	75 years, 22 days
23	Ranieri Mazzilli	27 Apr 1910	51 years, 120 days 25 Aug 1961	51 years, 133 days 7 Sep 1961	2 years, 208 days (Note: This is the length of Mazzilli's first (1961–1964) post-presidency, between his two acting presidencies.)	21 Apr 1975	64 years, 359 days
24	João Goulart	1 Mar 1919	42 years, 190 days 7 Sep 1961	45 years, 31 days 1 Apr 1964	12 years, 249 days	6 Dec 1976	57 years, 280 days
25	Ranieri Mazzilli	27 Apr 1910	53 years, 341 days 2 Apr 1964	53 years, 354 days 15 Apr 1964	11 years, 6 days (Note: This is the length of Mazzilli's second (1964–1975) post-presidency, after his second acting presidency.)	21 Apr 1975	64 years, 359 days
26	Castelo Branco	20 Sep 1897	66 years, 208 days 15 Apr 1964	69 years, 176 days 15 Mar 1967	125 days	18 Jul 1967	69 years, 301 days
27	Costa e Silva	3 Oct 1899	67 years, 163 days 15 Mar 1967	69 years, 332 days 31 Aug 1969 (Note: Incapacitated by illness and replaced by a military junta; the office was declared vacant on 14 October 1969.)	108 days	17 Dec 1969	70 years, 75 days
28	Emílio Garrastazu Médici	4 Dec 1905	63 years, 330 days 30 Oct 1969	68 years, 101 days 15 Mar 1974	11 years, 208 days	9 Oct 1985	79 years, 309 days
29	Ernesto Geisel	3 Aug 1907	66 years, 224 days 15 Mar 1974	71 years, 224 days 15 Mar 1979	17 years, 181 days	12 Sep 1996	89 years, 40 days
30	João Figueiredo	15 Jan 1918	61 years, 59 days 15 Mar 1979	67 years, 59 days 15 Mar 1985	14 years, 284 days	24 Dec 1999	81 years, 343 days
31	José Sarney	24 Apr 1930	54 years, 325 days 15 Mar 1985 (Note: Acting president during the illness of president-elect Tancredo Neves, who died without taking office; became president on 21 April 1985.)	59 years, 325 days 15 Mar 1990	36 years, 245 days	(living)	96 years, 205 days
32	Fernando Collor	12 Aug 1949	40 years, 215 days 15 Mar 1990	43 years, 139 days 29 Dec 1992 (Note: Resigned during impeachment proceedings; had been suspended from office since 2 October 1992.)	33 years, 321 days	(living)	77 years, 95 days
33	Itamar Franco	28 Jun 1930	62 years, 184 days 29 Dec 1992 (Note: Acting president since 2 October 1992.)	64 years, 187 days 1 Jan 1995	16 years, 182 days	2 Jul 2011	81 years, 4 days
34	Fernando Henrique Cardoso	18 Jun 1931	63 years, 197 days 1 Jan 1995	71 years, 197 days 1 Jan 2003	23 years, 318 days	(living)	95 years, 150 days
35	Luiz Inácio Lula da Silva	27 Oct 1945	57 years, 66 days 1 Jan 2003	65 years, 66 days 1 Jan 2011	12 years, 0 days (Note: This is the length of Lula's first (2011–2023) post-presidency, between his terms in office.)	(living)	81 years, 19 days
36	Dilma Rousseff	14 Dec 1947	63 years, 18 days 1 Jan 2011	68 years, 261 days 31 Aug 2016 (Note: Removed from office through impeachment.)	10 years, 76 days	(living)	78 years, 336 days
37	Michel Temer	23 Sep 1940	75 years, 343 days 31 Aug 2016 (Note: Acting president since 12 May 2016.)	78 years, 100 days 1 Jan 2019	7 years, 318 days	(living)	86 years, 53 days
38	Jair Bolsonaro	21 Mar 1955	63 years, 286 days 1 Jan 2019	67 years, 286 days 1 Jan 2023	3 years, 318 days	(living)	71 years, 239 days
39	Luiz Inácio Lula da Silva	27 Oct 1945	77 years, 66 days 1 Jan 2023	(Incumbent)	(Incumbent)	(living)	81 years, 19 days

== Graphical representation ==
This is a graphical lifespan timeline of the presidents of Brazil, listed in order of their first term. Presidential terms are colored according to the period of the Republic in which they took place.

The following chart shows presidents by their age (living presidents in green), with the years of their presidency in blue. The chart starts at 35 years as it is the minimum age to be president.
