= Rio Branco =

Rio Branco or Río Branco (Portuguese for "White River") may refer to:

== People ==
- José Paranhos, Viscount of Rio Branco (1819–1880), Brazilian statesman, journalist, diplomat, politician and educator
- José Paranhos, Baron of Rio Branco (1845–1912), Brazilian diplomat, lawyer, professor, politician and historian

== Geography ==
- Rio Branco, Acre, capital city of the Brazilian state of Acre
- Rio Branco, Mato Grosso, Brazil
- Rio Branco, Rio Grande do Sul, a neighbourhood in Porto Alegre, Brazil
- Río Branco, Uruguay, a city in the department of Cerro Largo, Uruguay
- Rio Branco do Ivaí, a municipality in Paraná, Brazil
- Rio Branco do Sul, a municipality in Paraná, Brazil
- Avenida Rio Branco, a major street in central Rio de Janeiro
- Branco River, a tributary of the Rio Negro, known in Brazil as Rio Branco
- Mount Rio Branco, Graham Land, Antarctica
- Visconde do Rio Branco, a city located in the Brazilian state of Minas Gerais
- The former name of the Brazilian territory, and later state, of Roraima

== Sports ==
=== Clubs ===
- Rio Branco Football Club, a Brazilian football team from Rio Branco, Acre
- Rio Branco Atlético Clube, a Brazilian football team from Cariacica, Espírito Santo
- Rio Branco Futebol Clube, a Brazilian football team from Venda Nova do Imigrante, Espírito Santo
- Clube Esportivo Rio Branco, a Brazilian football team from Campos dos Goytacazes, Rio de Janeiro
- Rio Branco de Andradas Futebol Clube, a Brazilian football team from Andradas, Minas Gerais
- Rio Branco Esporte Clube, a Brazilian football team from Americana, São Paulo
- Rio Branco Sport Club, a Brazilian football club from Paranaguá, Paraná

=== Tournaments ===
- Copa Río Branco, a national football team's competition between Brazil and Uruguay

== Other uses ==
- Instituto Rio Branco, Brazil's diplomatic academy
- Order of Rio Branco (Ordem de Rio Branco), an honorific order of Brazil

== See also ==
- Branco River (disambiguation)
