= British Army uniform and equipment in World War I =

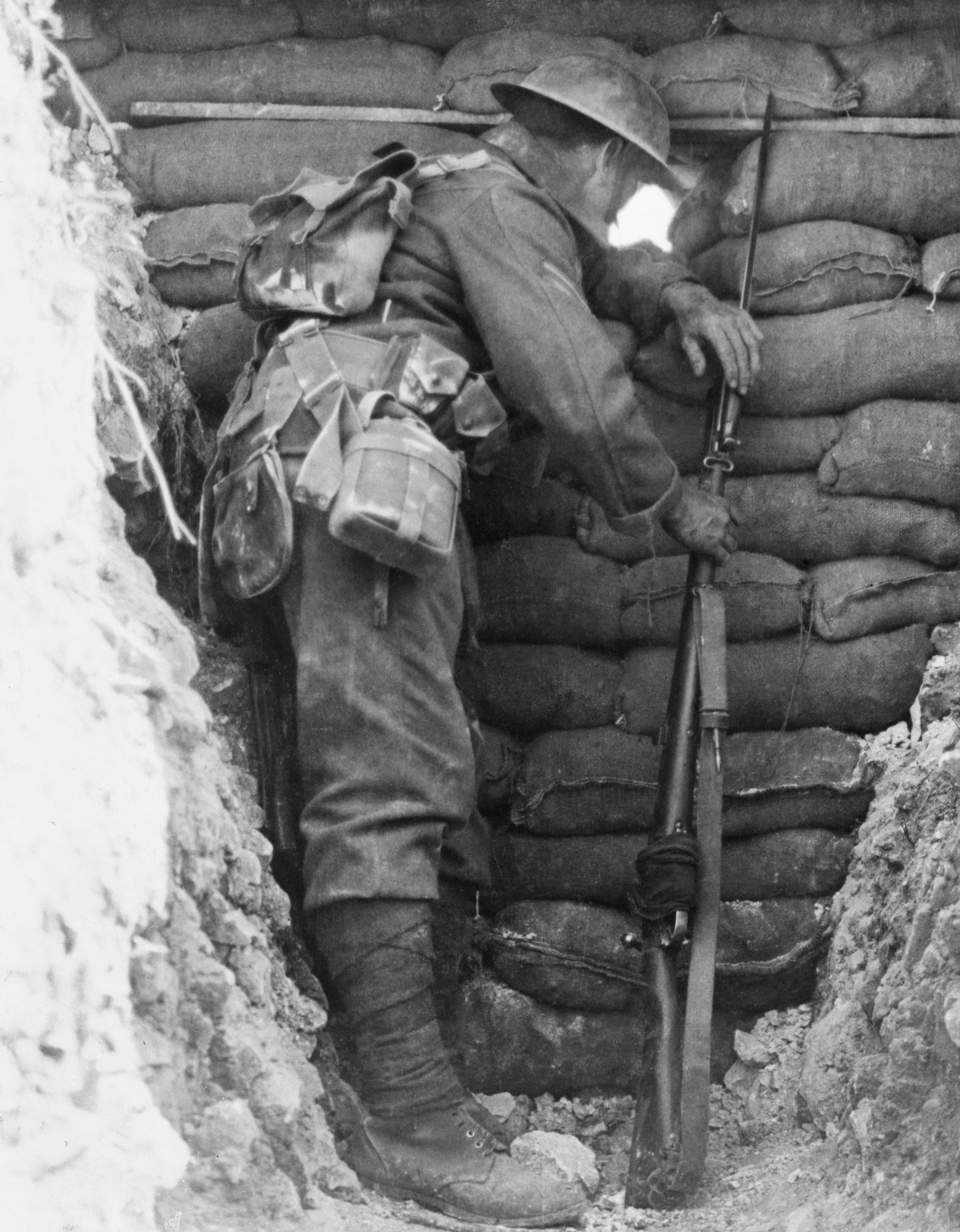
An infantryman of the Worcestershire Regiment on the Western Front in 1916, wearing the 1908 pattern webbing equipment, a Brodie helmet, and puttees

The British Army used a variety of standardized battle uniforms and weapons during World War I. According to the British official historian Brigadier James E. Edmonds writing in 1925, "The British Army of 1914 was the best trained best equipped and best organized British Army ever sent to war". The value of drab clothing was quickly recognised by the British Army, who introduced Khaki drill for Indian and colonial warfare from the mid-19th century on. As part of a series of reforms following the Second Boer War, a darker khaki serge was adopted in 1902, for service dress in Britain itself.

The classic scarlet, dark-blue and rifle-green uniforms of the British Army had been retained for full-dress and off-duty ("walking out") usage after 1902, but were put into storage as part of the mobilisation process of August 1914. In this the British military authorities showed more foresight than their French counterparts, who retained highly visible blue coats and red trousers of peacetime for active service until the final units received a new uniform over a year into World War I.

The British soldier was issued with the 1908 Pattern Webbing for carrying personal equipment, and he was armed with the Short Magazine Lee–Enfield rifle.

== Uniform ==
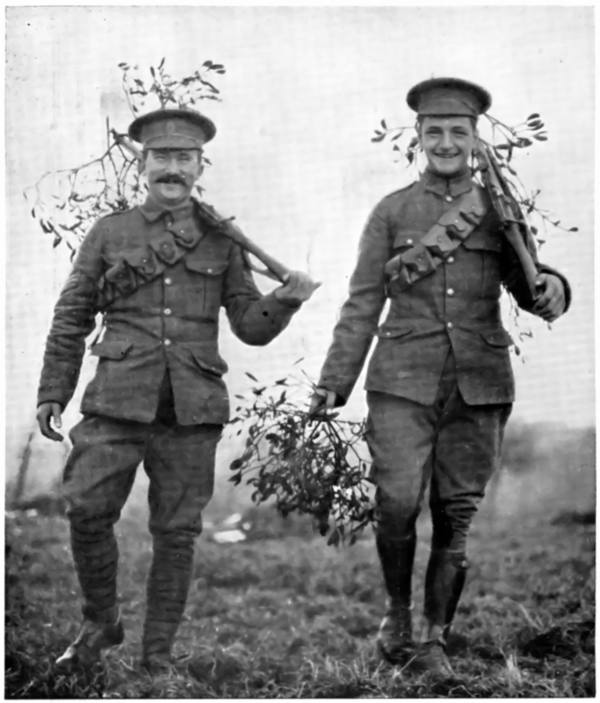
British soldiers at Christmas 1914 wearing the 1905 forage cap(Service Dress (SD) Cap.) and the 1902 Pattern service dress. Their bandolier equipment would suggest that these men are from a mounted unit.

The British soldiers went to war in August 1914 wearing the 1902 Pattern Service Dress tunic and trousers. This was a thick woollen tunic, dyed khaki. There were two breast pockets for personal items and the soldier's AB64 Pay Book, two smaller pockets for other items, and an internal pocket sewn under the right flap of the lower tunic where the First Field Dressing was kept. Rifle patches were sewn just above the breast pockets, to prevent wear from the webbing equipment and Enfield rifle. Shoulder straps were sewn on and fastened with brass buttons (black for rifle regiments), with enough space for a brass regimental shoulder title. Rank insignia was sewn onto the upper tunic sleeves, while trade badges and Long Service and Good Conduct stripes were placed on the lower sleeves. A stiffened peak cap was worn, made of the same material, with a leather strap, brass fitting and secured with two small brass buttons. Puttees were worn around the ankles and calves, and ammunition boots with hobnail soles on the feet.

=== Tropical Variation ===
There were also lightweight uniforms for wear in warmer climates, e.g. India known as Khaki drill. The Officers' uniform was a little different in cut, but the Other Ranks' tunic was distinguished from the temperate service dress by having only the breast pockets. Both were made from a lighter cloth (both in weight, and in shade).

=== Scottish Variations ===
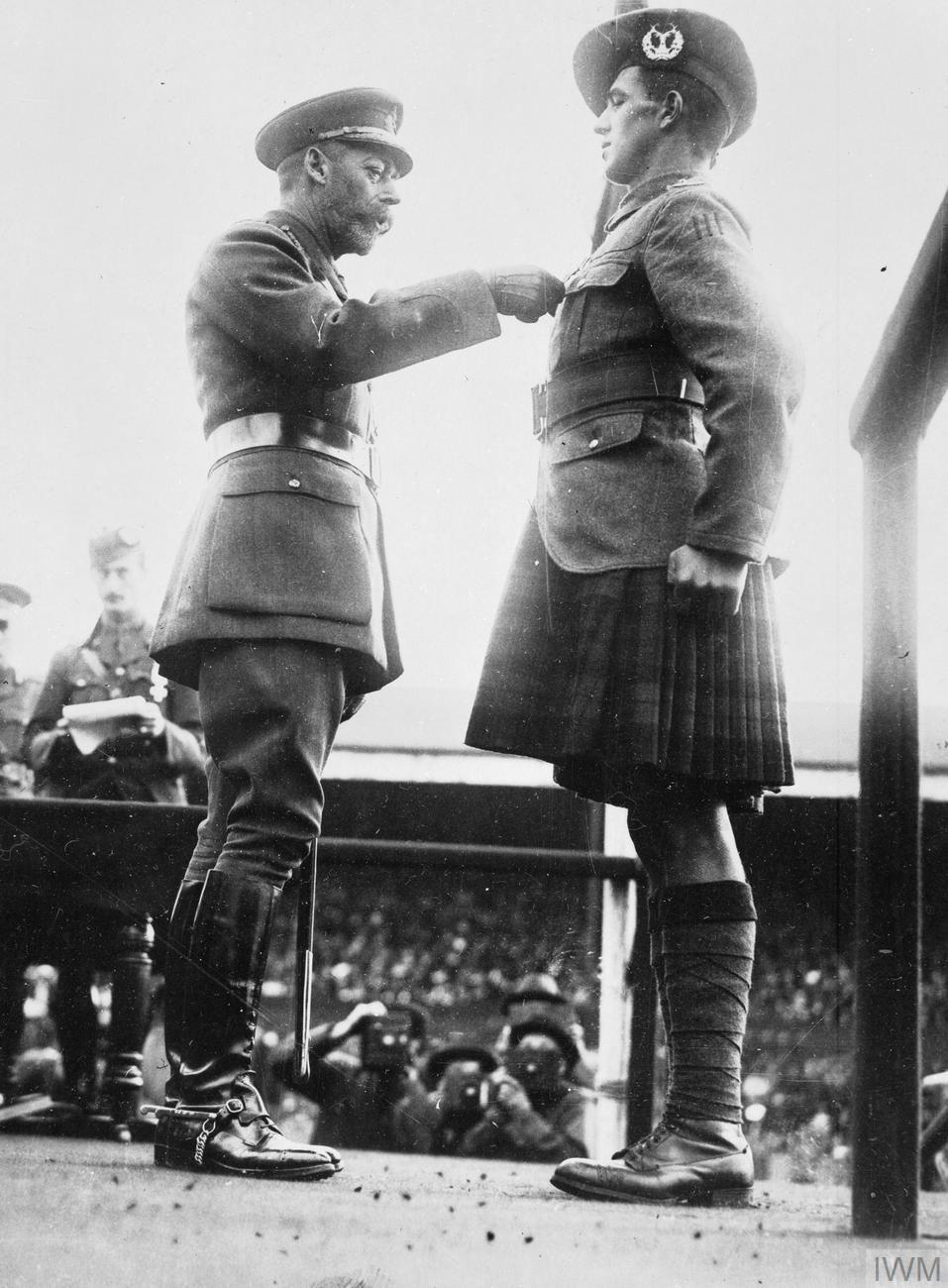
A soldier of the Gordon Highlanders being decorated by King George V in 1917. He wears the Balmoral bonnet, but not the khaki apron which would have covered the kilt in the field.

Uniform for Highland regiments differed in the design of the tunic, which was made to resemble the traditional Highland dress, notably in the cut-away front of the tunic to allow the wearing of a sporran. A kilt of the regimental tartan was covered by a khaki apron on active service; it had pockets since sporrans were not worn in the field. Puttees were worn over khaki hose (woollen sock tops). All Scottish units wore the Glengarry bonnet in 1914, but this was found to be impractical and was replaced during 1915 by the Balmoral bonnet, which resembled the civilian Tam O'Shanter.

== Personal Equipment ==
=== 1908 Pattern Webbing Equipment ===
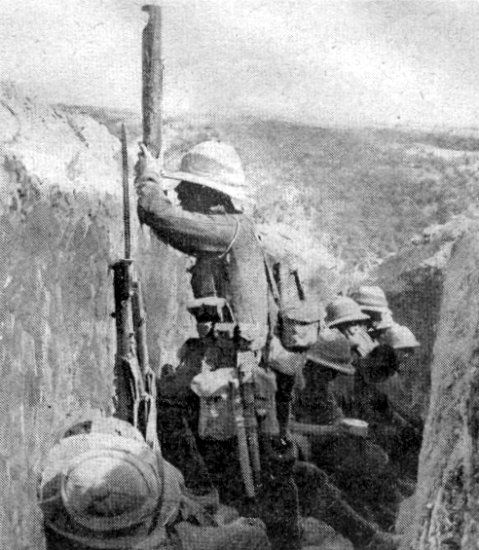
British troops at Gallipoli wearing 1908 pattern webbing and Pith helmets.

The British were the first European army to replace leather belts and pouches with webbing, a strong material made from woven cotton, which had been pioneered in the United States by the Mills Equipment Company. The 1908 Pattern Webbing equipment comprised a wide belt, left and right ammunition pouches which held 75 rounds each; left and right braces, a bayonet frog and attachment for the entrenching tool handle, an entrenching tool head in web cover, water bottle carrier, small haversack and large pack. A mess tin was worn attached to one of the packs, and was contained inside a cloth buff-coloured khaki cover. Inside the haversack were personal items, a knife, and, when on Active Service, unused portions of the daily ration. The large pack could sometimes be used to house some of these items, but was normally kept for carrying the soldier's Greatcoat and or a blanket. The full set of 1908 webbing could weigh over 70 pounds (32 kg).

=== 1903 Bandolier Equipment ===
The British personal equipment used in the Second Boer War had been found to be deficient for a number of reasons, and the Bandolier Equipment was introduced as a stop-gap replacement. The equipment was made of brown leather and consisted of five 10-round ammunition pouches worn over one shoulder on a bandolier, with an associated waist belt and pouches, and a haversack and water bottle. It soon proved to be unsuitable for infantry use, but was used throughout the First World War by cavalry and other mounted troops. The cavalry version of the 1903 Equipment had a further four ammunition pouches on the bandolier, worn on the soldier's back, giving a total of 90 rounds carried.

=== 1914 Pattern Leather Equipment ===
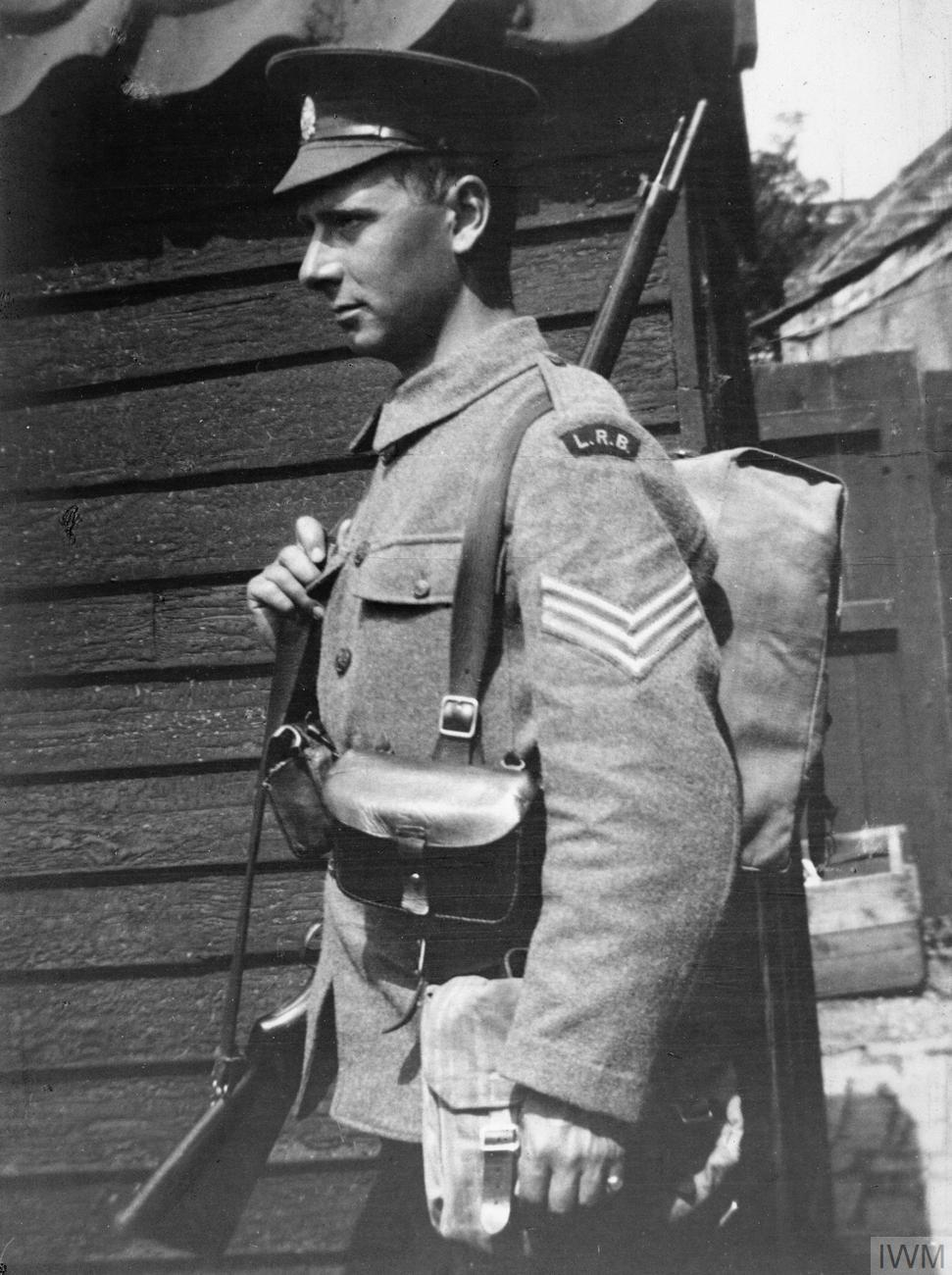
A sergeant of the London Regiment wearing the 1914 Pattern Leather Equipment

On the outbreak of war, it became clear that the Mills Equipment Company would be quite unable to keep up with the sudden demand for webbing. Therefore, a version of the 1908 equipment was designed to be made in leather, as both Britain and the USA had large leather working industries with excess capacity. The leather was coloured with either a brown or khaki finish, and the packs and haversacks were made from canvas. It was originally intended that the leather equipment would be used by units in training or on home service, and that it would be exchanged for webbing before going on active service. However, in practice, reinforcement drafts and sometimes whole battalions would arrive at the front line still with their leather equipment.

=== Pith helmet ===
The Pith helmet is a lightweight helmet made of cork or pith, with a cloth cover, designed to shade the wearer's head from the sun. The type used in the First World War was the 1902 Wolseley pattern helmet. They were widely worn by British Empire troops fighting in the Middle East and Africa. It had a wide pocket on the outer helmet.

=== Brodie Helmet ===
The first delivery of a protective steel helmet (the Brodie helmet) to the British Army was in 1915. Initially there were far from enough helmets to equip every man, so they were designated as "trench stores", to be kept in the front line and used by each unit that occupied the sector. It was not until the summer of 1916, when the first 1 million helmets had been produced, that they could be generally issued.

The helmet reduced casualties but was criticized by General Herbert Plumer on the grounds that it was too shallow, too reflective; its rim was too sharp, and its lining was too slippery. These criticisms were addressed in the Mark I model helmet of 1916 which had a separate folded rim, a two-part liner, and matte khaki paint finished with sand, sawdust, or crushed cork to give a dull, non-reflective appearance.

=== Gas helmets ===
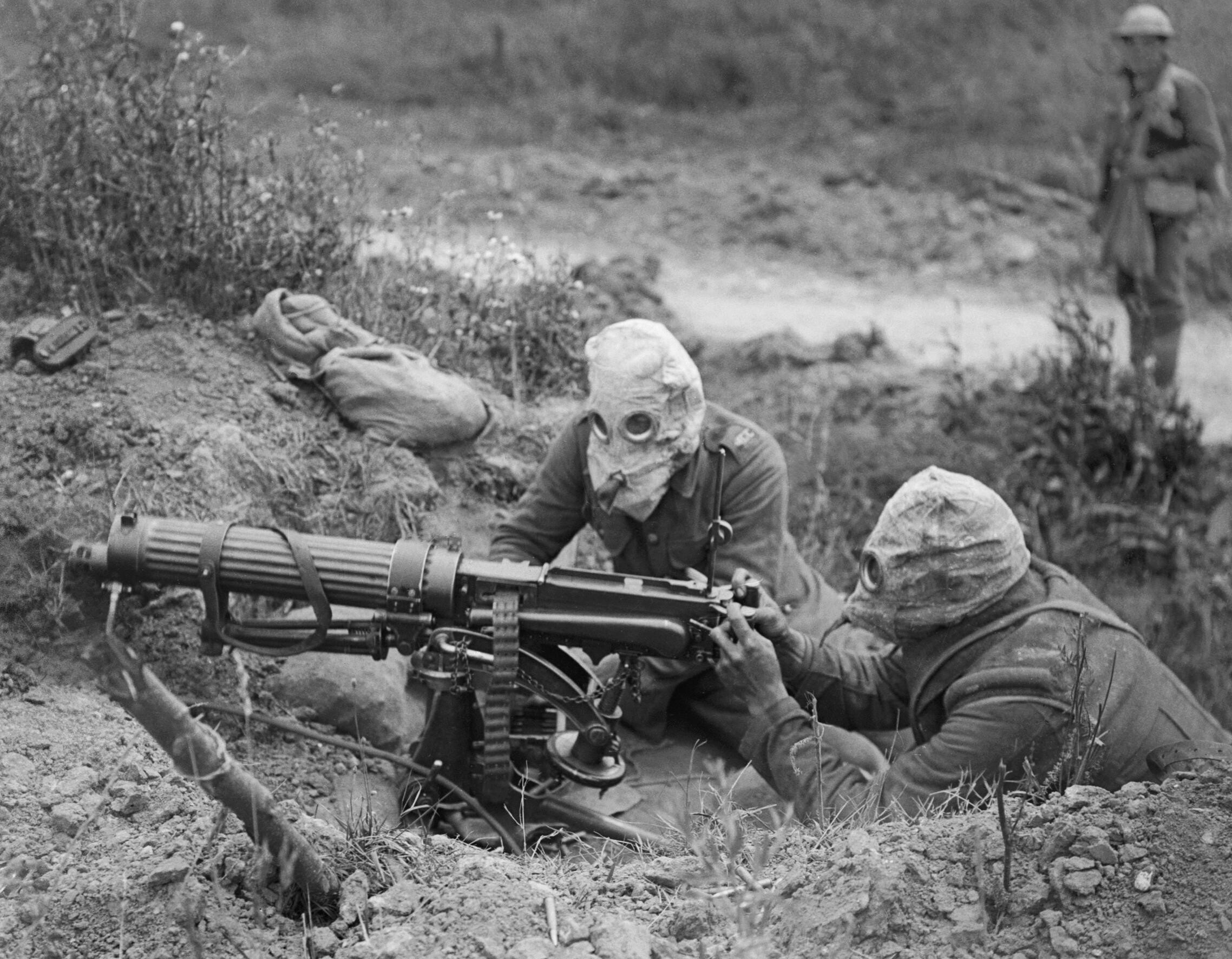
British Vickers machine gun crew wearing PH-type gas helmets during the Battle of the Somme, July 1916

The first use of poison gas on the Western Front was on 22 April 1915, by the Germans at Ypres, against Canadian and French colonial troops. The initial response was to equip troops with cotton mouth pads for protection. Soon afterwards the British introduced the Black Veil Respirator, which consisted of a long cloth which was used to tie chemical-soaked mouth pads into place. Dr. Cluny MacPherson of the Royal Newfoundland Regiment brought the idea of a mask made of chemical absorbing fabric and which fitted over the entire head to England, and this was developed into the British Hypo Helmet of June 1915. This mask offered protection to the eyes as well as to the respiratory system. One British officer described it as "a smoke helmet, a greasy grey-felt bag with a talc window certainly ineffective against gas". The following PH helmet had two celluloid eyepieces, but there was no way to expel the carbon dioxide build up inside the mask . This type of mask went through several stages of development before being superseded in 1916 by the canister gas mask the Small box respirator. This had a mask connected to a tin can containing the absorbent materials by a hose and an outlet valve to reduce the carbon dioxide build up inside the mask.

== Weapons ==
=== Revolvers ===
The standard-issue Webley revolver at the outbreak of World War I was the Webley Mk V (adopted 9 December 1913), but there were considerably more Mk IV revolvers in service in 1914, as the initial order for 20,000 Mk V revolvers had not been completed when hostilities began. On 24 May 1915, the Webley Mk VI was adopted as the standard sidearm for British troops and remained so for the duration of World War I, being issued to officers, airmen, naval crews, boarding parties, trench raiders, machine-gun teams, and tank crews. The Mk VI proved to be a very reliable and hardy weapon, well suited to the mud and adverse conditions of trench warfare, and several accessories were developed for the Mk VI, including a bayonet (made from a converted French Pritchard bayonet), a speedloader device ("Prideaux Device"), and a stock allowing for the revolver to be converted into a carbine. Nevertheless the British Government in 1915 was obliged to look overseas to purchase additional revolvers, which would be chambered in .455. These would be provided by Smith and Wesson with the .455 Triplelock and .455 Hand Ejector Mark II, Colt with the .455 New Service. In November 1915 Spanish makers would supply the .455 Trocaola which in British service was designated the "Pistol Old Pattern No2 Mark 1". These were then issued out as per the normal allocation to each unit requiring revolvers. As officers in the British Army at that time were required to purchase their own pistols, some opted for other weapons, or used weapons previously owned by them or their family before the war broke out such as the Webley "WG", the Webley-Wilkinson and even such as the Webley–Fosbery Automatic Revolver, but it was never service issue.

=== Rifles ===
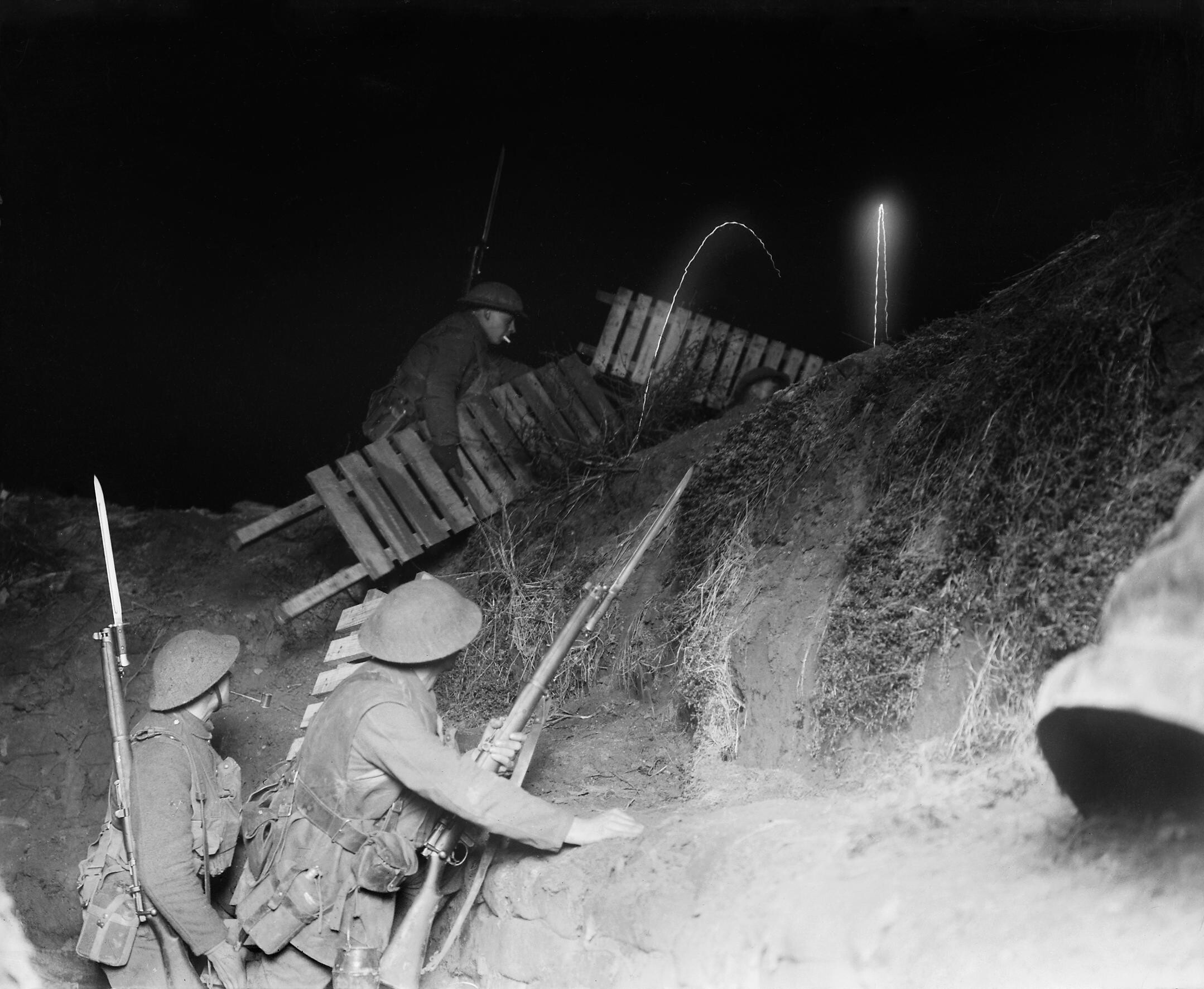
Soldiers armed with Lee–Enfield rifles and wearing Brodie helmets in a trench at night, Cambrai – 12 January 1918

==== Short Magazine Lee–Enfield Mk III ====
The Lee–Enfield rifle, the SMLE Mk III, was introduced on 26 January 1907, along with a Pattern 1907 bayonet (P'07) and featured a simplified rear sight arrangement and a fixed, rather than a bolt-head-mounted sliding, charger guide. The fast-operating Lee bolt-action and large magazine capacity enabled a trained rifleman to fire 20 to 30 aimed rounds a minute, making the Lee–Enfield the fastest military bolt-action rifle of the day. World War I accounts tell of British troops repelling German attackers who subsequently reported that they had encountered machine guns, when in fact it was simply a group of trained riflemen armed with SMLE Mk III rifles. During the war, the standard SMLE Mk III was found to be too complicated to manufacture (an SMLE Mk III rifle cost the British Government £3/15/-), and demand was outstripping supply, so in late 1915 the Mk III* was introduced.

==== Pattern 1914 ====
Developed from the Pattern 1913 experimental rifle, the Pattern 1914 was adapted to fire the standard .303 ammunition and manufactured in the United States by Winchester and Remington in an attempt to solve the shortage of SMLE rifles. They were issued to training and second-line units and late in the war, saw front-line service as a sniper rifle fitted with a telescopic sight.

=== Machine guns ===
==== Vickers Machine Gun ====
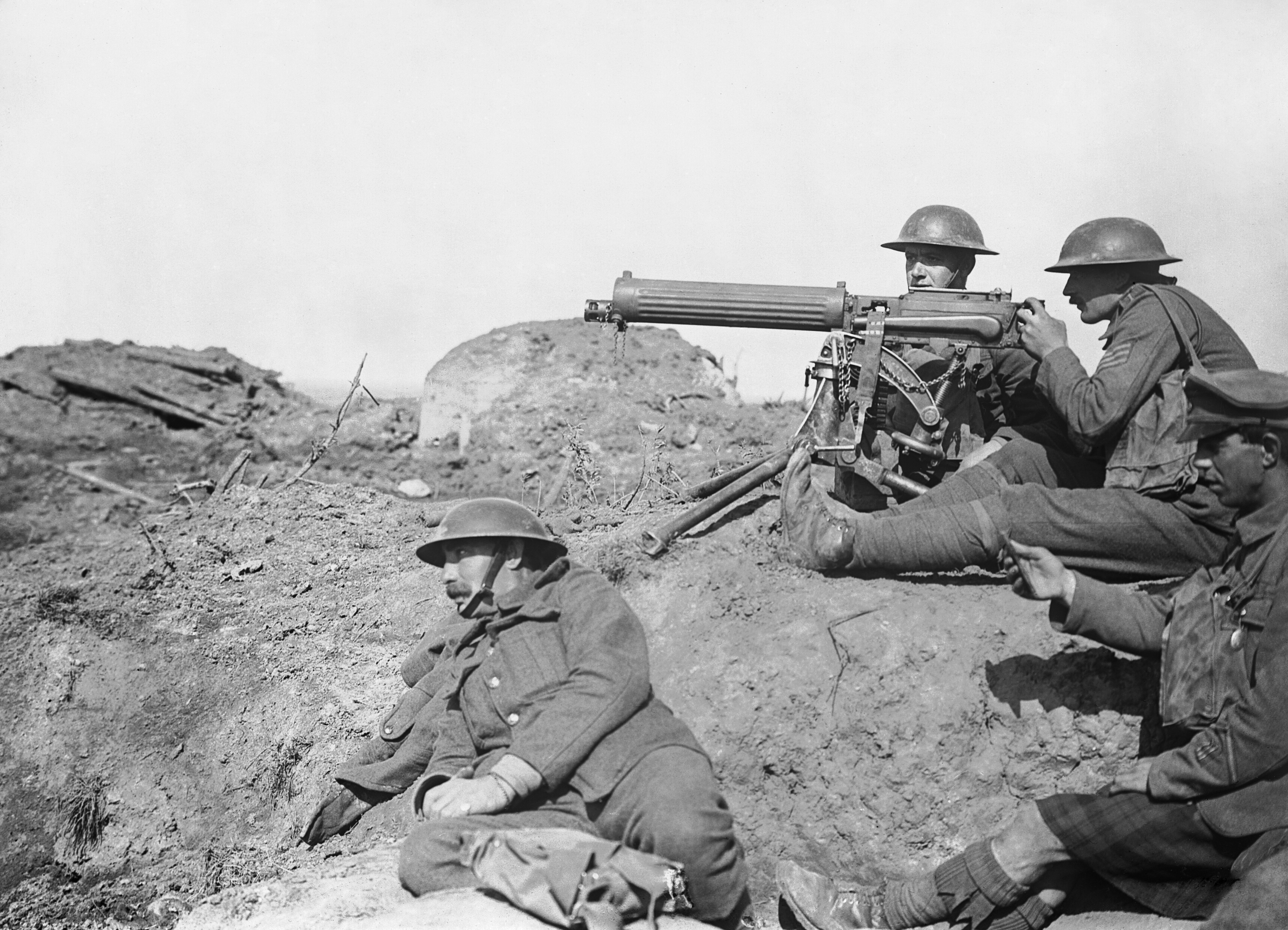
Vickers machine gun crew, Western Front.

The Vickers machine gun accompanied the BEF to France in 1914, and in the years that followed, proved itself to be the most reliable weapon on the battlefield, some of its feats of endurance entering military mythology. Perhaps the most incredible was the action by the 100th Company of the Machine Gun Corps at High Wood on 24 August 1916. This company had ten Vickers guns, and it was ordered to give sustained covering fire for twelve hours onto a selected area 2,000 yards (1,800 m) away in order to prevent German troops forming up there for a counter-attack while a British attack was in progress. Two companies of infantrymen were allocated as carriers of ammunition, rations and water for the machine-gunners. Two men worked a belt-filling machine non-stop for twelve hours keeping up a supply of 250-round belts. 100 new barrels were used up, and all the water, including the men's drinking water and contents of the latrine buckets, was used to keep the guns cool. In that twelve-hour period the ten guns fired a million rounds between them. One team is reported to have fired 120,000 from their gun to win a five franc prize offered to the highest-scoring gun. At the end of operation, it is alleged that every gun was working perfectly and that not one gun had broken down during the whole period. It was this reliability which endeared the Vickers to the soldiers that used it. It rarely broke down; it just kept on firing. Demand from the British Army for Vickers machine guns was so high that Vickers had to find new ways of increasing production and by 1915 Vickers had supplied the British armed forces with 2,405 guns. These increases continued throughout the war: 7,429 were supplied in 1916, 21,782 in 1917 and 39,473 in 1918.

Initially operated by a machine gun section within each infantry battalion and generally used in the direct fire role, the arrival of light machine guns in late 1915 allowed the Vickers guns to be withdrawn and issued to the Machine Gun Corps, which was formed in October of that year, and who deployed them in a supporting role from a rear or flanking position.

==== Lewis Machine gun ====
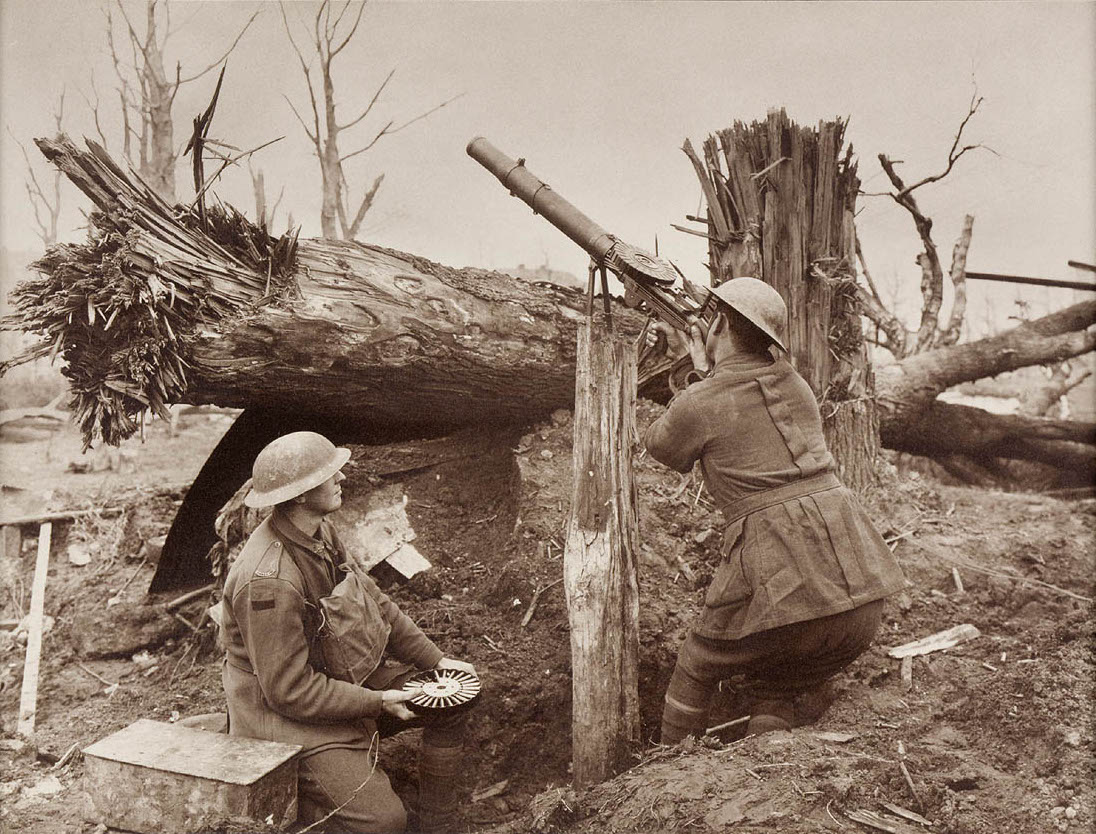
Lewis gun used in an anti aircraft role

The British officially adopted the Lewis machine gun in .303-inch calibre for Land and Aircraft use in October 1915. Despite costing more than a Vickers gun to manufacture, £165 against about £100 for the Vickers, Lewis machine-guns were in high demand with the British military during World War I. The Lewis had the advantages of being considerably more portable and about 80% faster to build than the Vickers gun Between August 1914 and June 1915 the British government placed orders for 3,052 Lewis guns. By the end of World War I over 50,000 Lewis Guns had been produced in the US and UK and they were nearly ubiquitous on the Western Front, outnumbering the Vickers gun by a ratio of about three to one.

The Lewis Gun utilised two different drum magazines, one holding 47 and the other 97 rounds of ammunition, and had a rate of fire of 500 to 600 rounds per minute. The gun weighed 28 pounds (13 kg), only about half as much as a typical medium machine gun of the era, such as the Vickers machine gun, and was chosen in part because, being more portable than the Vickers, it could be carried and used by a single soldier.

==== Hotchkiss Mark I ====
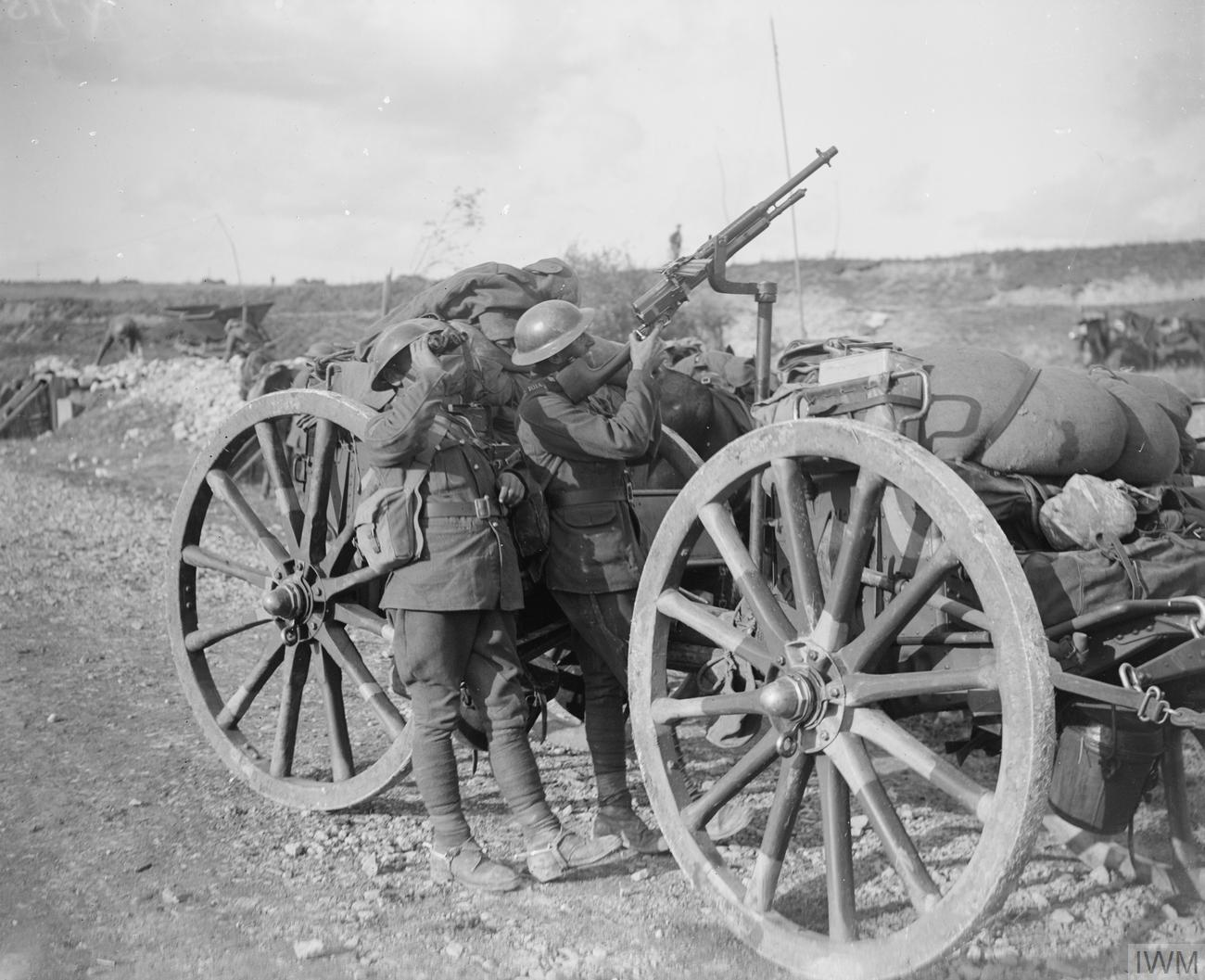
Royal Horse Artillery troops using a Hotchkiss Mk I in 1918

The Hotchkiss "Portable" was a version of the French light machine gun rechambered for British .303 ammunition and made at the invitation of the British government at a purpose-built factory in Coventry. It was chiefly issued to cavalry regiments. It was fed with 30-round metal strips. The later Mark I* version with a pistol grip instead of the original wooden stock was used in tanks.

=== Mortars ===
Mortars are curved trajectory weapons that can lob shells into trenches whose occupants would be unaffected by flat trajectory weapons but, compared to the standard artillery guns, mortars have a relatively short range. During the early years of the war it quickly became clear that some type of weapon was needed to provide artillery like fire support to the infantry. Such minenwerfer weapons were used to great effect by the German Army in 1914. A weapon that was fully man transportable yet could fire reasonably powerful shells at targets beyond the range of rifle- or hand-launched grenades was badly needed.

==== 2-inch mortar ====
The 2-inch Medium Mortar was designed and manufactured by the Royal Ordnance Factories in early 1915 and introduced along with the 1.57 inch mortar in March 1915. It incorporated what was known of the German pre war Krupp mortar. This was the first design to meet all the requirements, after modifications to simplify manufacture, it fired a spherical cast iron bomb of 42 lb (19 kg) which was considered the largest practical size for use from trenches, at ranges from 100 yards (91 m) to 600 yards (550 m) using a simple 2 inches (51 mm) tube as the mortar body. Drawbacks were that the steel tail was usually projected backwards towards the firer when the bomb detonated, resulting in occasional casualties; and the No. 80 fuse was also required by the 18 pounder field guns which were given priority, limiting mortar ammunition supply to the front until early 1916, when a special cheap trench mortar fuse was developed. The 2-inch mortar served in limited numbers in France in 1915, from March, with early mortars and ammunition made by the Royal Ordnance Factory, mass production finally began with an order in August 1915, for 800 mortars from several railway workshops and agricultural machinery makers, together with an order for 675,000 bombs from numerous small firms.

==== Stokes mortar ====
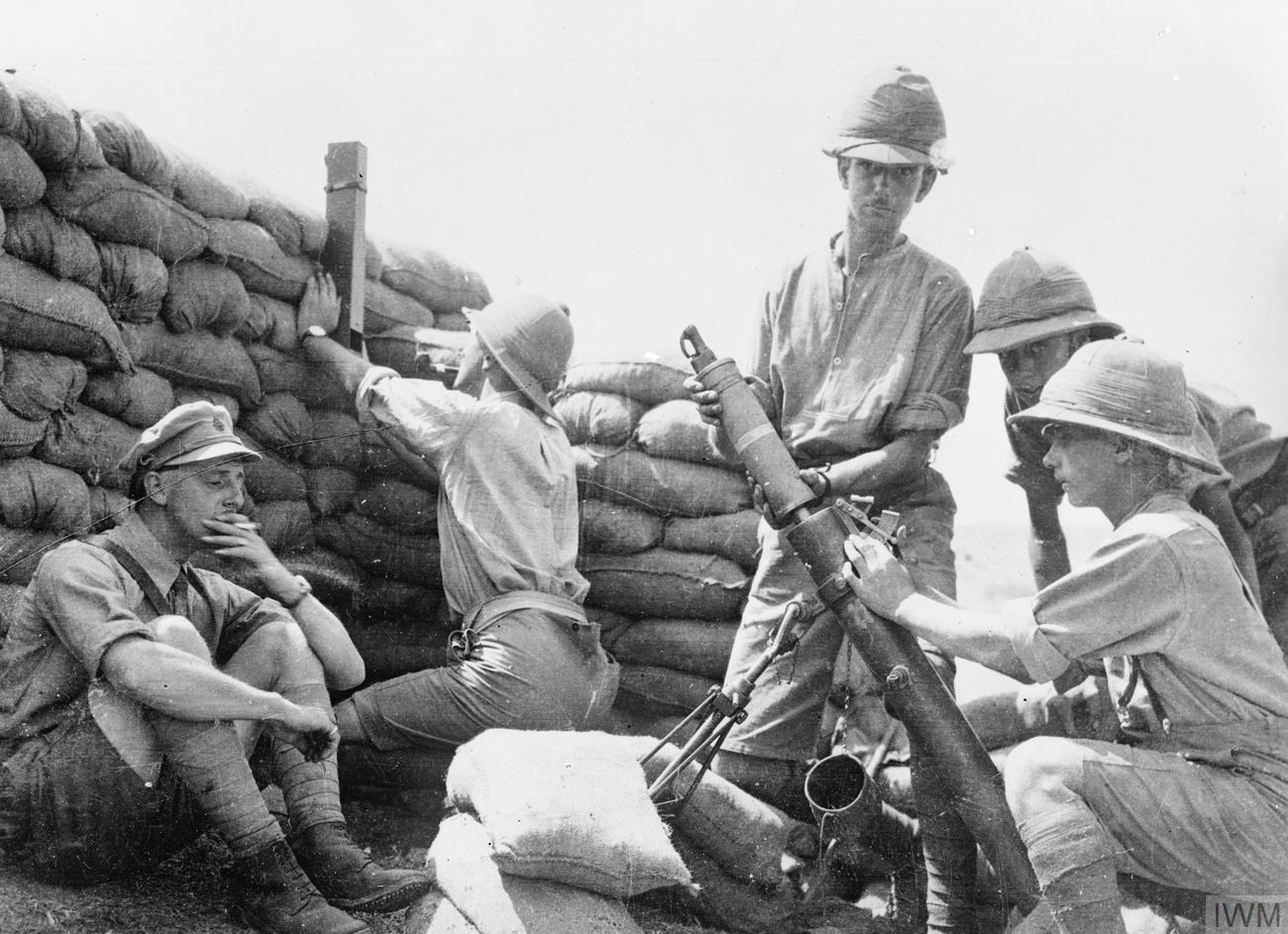
Stokes Mortar in action in the Middle East

The 2 inch medium mortar was superseded by the 3-inch Stokes Mortar, which was first issued at the end of 1915 which was later adopted by the French Army too. The Stokes Mortar was a simple weapon, that was easy to manufacture and use. The weapon was broken down into three sections for easy transport, the barrel ('tube') which weighed 43 pounds, the base plate weighed 28 pounds (13 kg) and bipod weighed 37 pounds (17 kg) for a total of 108 pounds (49 kg). The Stokes mortar could fire as many as 25 bombs per minute and had a maximum range of 800 yards (730 m). British Empire units had 1,636 Stokes mortars in service on the Western Front at the Armistice.

==== 9.45-inch mortar ====
The ML 9.45-inch (240 mm) mortar was a design based on the French 240 mm Trench Mortar and introduced in 1916, the British version differed from the French LT weapon in that the propellant charge was loaded through the muzzle In June 1916, following unsatisfactory trials with the French model, the army replaced them with 30 of its own model, firing a 150-pound bomb, followed by 200 more in December 1916. The 9.45 inch mortar also known as the "Flying Pig" was a corps level weapon.

=== Tanks ===
==== Mark I and later tanks ====
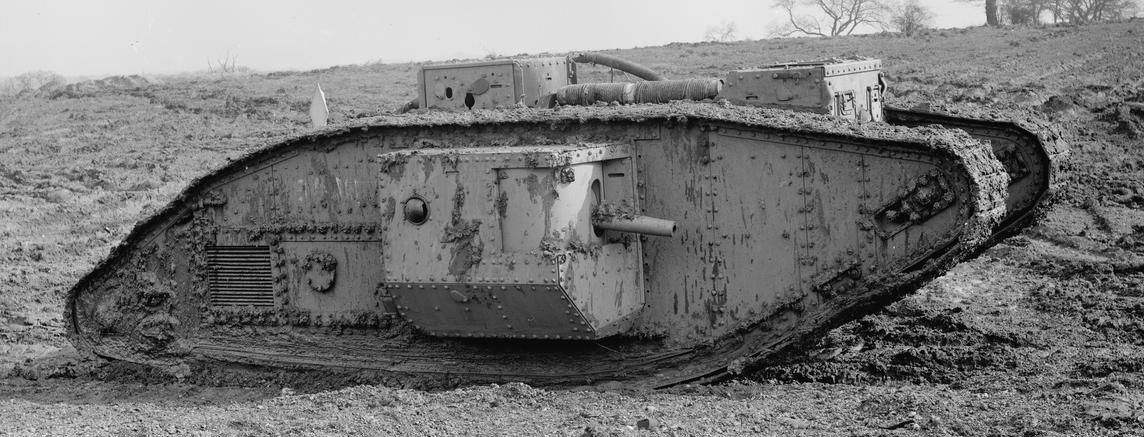
The Mark V (male tank armed with the 6 pounder gun here) was the most developed of the British heavy tanks, entering service in 1918.

The development of trench warfare based around obstacles such as trenches and barbed wire and covered by fast firing machine guns made attacking the enemy lines costly. There was a demand for a self-propelled and protected weapon which could move across any kind of terrain in support of the troops and that was effective against enemy machine gun emplacements, leading to the development of the tank. The great weakness of the armoured car was indeed that they required smooth terrain to move upon, and new developments were needed for cross-country capability. The Mark I tank was the first British tank to be used in battle; in February 1915, the First Lord of the Admiralty Winston Churchill created the Landship Committee to investigate a mechanical solution to the stalemate of trench warfare. The Mark I tanks, were operated by the Heavy Branch of the Machine Gun Corps and had a range of 23 miles (37 km) without refuelling and a speed of 3 miles per hour. The Mark I tank first saw service on the Somme in September 1916. The Mark I tank was available in two different configurations known as 'male' and 'female'. Male tanks mounted a 57mm six pounder gun in each sponson, plus three light Hotchkiss machine guns. Female tanks had two heavy Vickers machine guns in place of the six pounders. The tank evolved during the war and included developments such as the Mark IX tank which was for carrying troops (thirty infantrymen) or ten tons of cargo. The Mark IX was armed with two machine guns and had loopholes for the infantry to fire from.

==== Medium Mark A Whippet ====
Another tank in use was the Medium Mark A Whippet, while the heavy tanks had been designed to attack the German trenches the Tank Corps now wanted a lighter, faster tank to work with the cavalry over open country. The Whippet had a crew of four and was armed with three Hotchkiss machine guns, they weighed 14 tons and had a road speed of just over 8 miles (13 km) per hour and a radius of 80 miles (130 km). They were very fast by 1918, standards but tank crews found them difficult to drive and combat experience showed that it was not suitable for working with the cavalry. Whippets first saw service during the German Spring Offensive in 1918, by the end of the war the Whippet was responsible for more German casualties than any other British tank of the war.

=== Hand grenades ===
At the start of the war the only grenade in service with the army was the No 1 Grenade. Because of the problems associated with it, the Jam Tin Grenade was designed. It contained an inner can of explosive with an outer can of metal fragments or ball bearings. The fuses that were developed for the Jam Tin Grenade were activated by friction or a by lighted taper which was often replaced by a lighted cigarette. This was followed by the highly successful Mills bomb in 1915. It was oval in shape to fit into a clenched fist and time fused. The detonator was activated by a spring driven firing pin which was restrained by a lever that in turn was locked by a safety pin. The Mills bomb was a defensive grenade, but was also used in trench-raiding by assault troops. After throwing the user had to take cover immediately and a competent thrower could manage 20 yards (18 m) with reasonable accuracy. Adopted as the standard grenade, over 33 million Mills bombs were produced in the final three years of the war.

=== Artillery ===
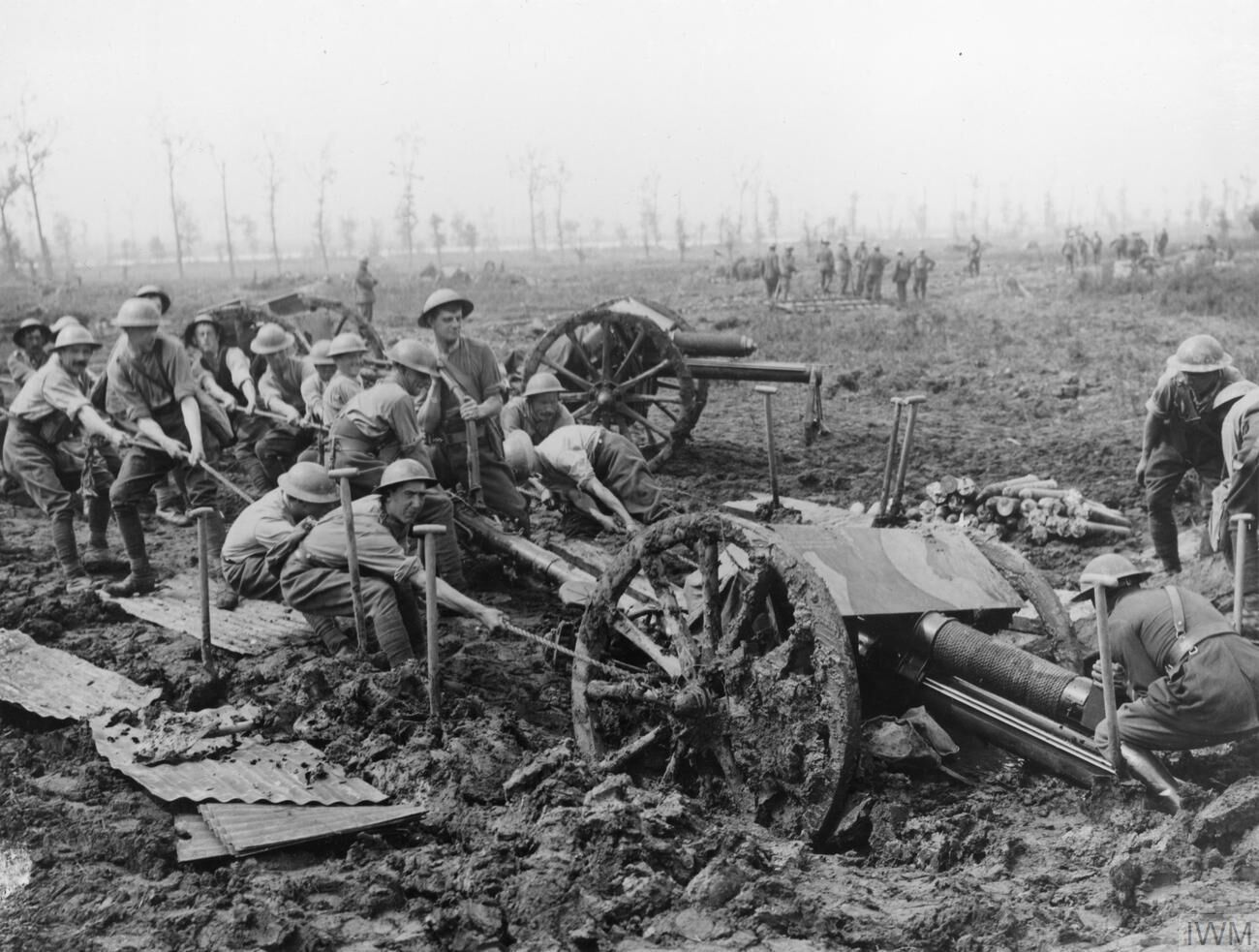
Soldiers haul an 18 pounder field gun out of the mud near Zillebeke August 1917

In 1914, the heaviest artillery gun was the 60 pounder gun, four in each of the heavy batteries. The Royal Horse Artillery had the QF 13 pounder gun and the Royal Field Artillery the QF 18 pounder gun. By 1918, the situation had changed and artillery were the dominant force on the battlefield. Between 1914 and 1918 the heavy and siege artillery of the Royal Garrison Artillery had increased from thirty two heavy and six siege batteries to 117 heavy and 401 siege batteries. With the increase in the number of batteries of heavier guns the armies need to find a more efficient method of moving the heavier guns around, (it was proving difficult to find the number of draught horses required) the War Office ordered over one thousand Holt 75 caterpillar tractors, which transformed the mobility of the siege artillery. The army also mounted a variety of surplus naval guns, on various railway platforms to provide mobile long-range heavy artillery on the Western Front.

==== Ordnance QF 18 pounder ====
The 18 pounder gun was the most important field gun of the war, with 8393 produced in Britain and 851 produced in the U.S by companies under contract by the end of the war and 113,000,000 rounds of ammunition issued. It was first introduced in 1904 and was made with a focus on shrapnel shells. It was made for flat trajectory and it’s purpose was for direct-fire missions, making it useless for trench warfare or if a soldier had a gun shield. Shrapnel rounds lose their effectiveness at long ranges, but it could fire up to 6500 feet. It could fire up to 43 rounds per minute. It was, as described by I.V Hogg and L.F Thurston on page 80 of British Artillery Weapons and Ammunition, “wire-wound, with a single-motion interrupted-screw breech and percussion firing gear. The carriage was a simple pole trail type, with a top carriage traverse and a hydro-spring recoil system giving a constant length of recoil.” Because this weapon was so important and heavily used, it saw a lot of wartime stress. This stress showed an issue with the carriage in 1916 where the recuperation springs were unable to put up with constant firing. In 1915, designs for a hydro-pneumatic recoil system was in the works that could be fitted over the existing hydro-spring so that it was able to be added by battery artificers in the field. The usual repair or periodic overhaul made the weapon into the MK1+ model. Later they would take the carriage cradle from the MK2 model and add an extension similar to the MK1 and that became the MK1C but when a MK2 cradle was added to the MK1 it became the MK1D.

==== BL 6-inch Mk VII naval gun ====
The 6-inch guns were first sent to France on 5 October 1914 with 7th Siege Battery, Royal Garrison Artillery, mounted on improvised field carriages. Following its successful employment in the battle of the Somme its role was defined as counter battery fire and also they "were most effective for neutralising defences and for wire cutting with a new fuse which reliably burst instantly above ground on even slight contact, instead of forming craters, they were also employed for long range fire against targets in depth. It was supposed to be replaced by the BL 6-inch gun Mk XIX, 310 of which were built during the war. This model gun served in all theatres, with 108 being in service on the Western front at the end of World War I.

==== BL 60 pounder gun ====
The 60 pounder guns were formed into "Heavy Batteries" in the First World War operated by the Royal Garrison Artillery and used mainly for counter-battery fire (i.e. suppressing or destroying the enemy's artillery). When the war began a single four gun battery was attached to each infantry division of the BEF. From early 1915, 60 pounder batteries moved from Division to Army control. From June 1916, the War Office adopted Major-General Birch's recommendations to increase heavy battery sizes to six guns, as more guns with better concentration of firepower were required on the Western Front, while minimising the administrative overhead of more batteries.

==== Railway guns ====
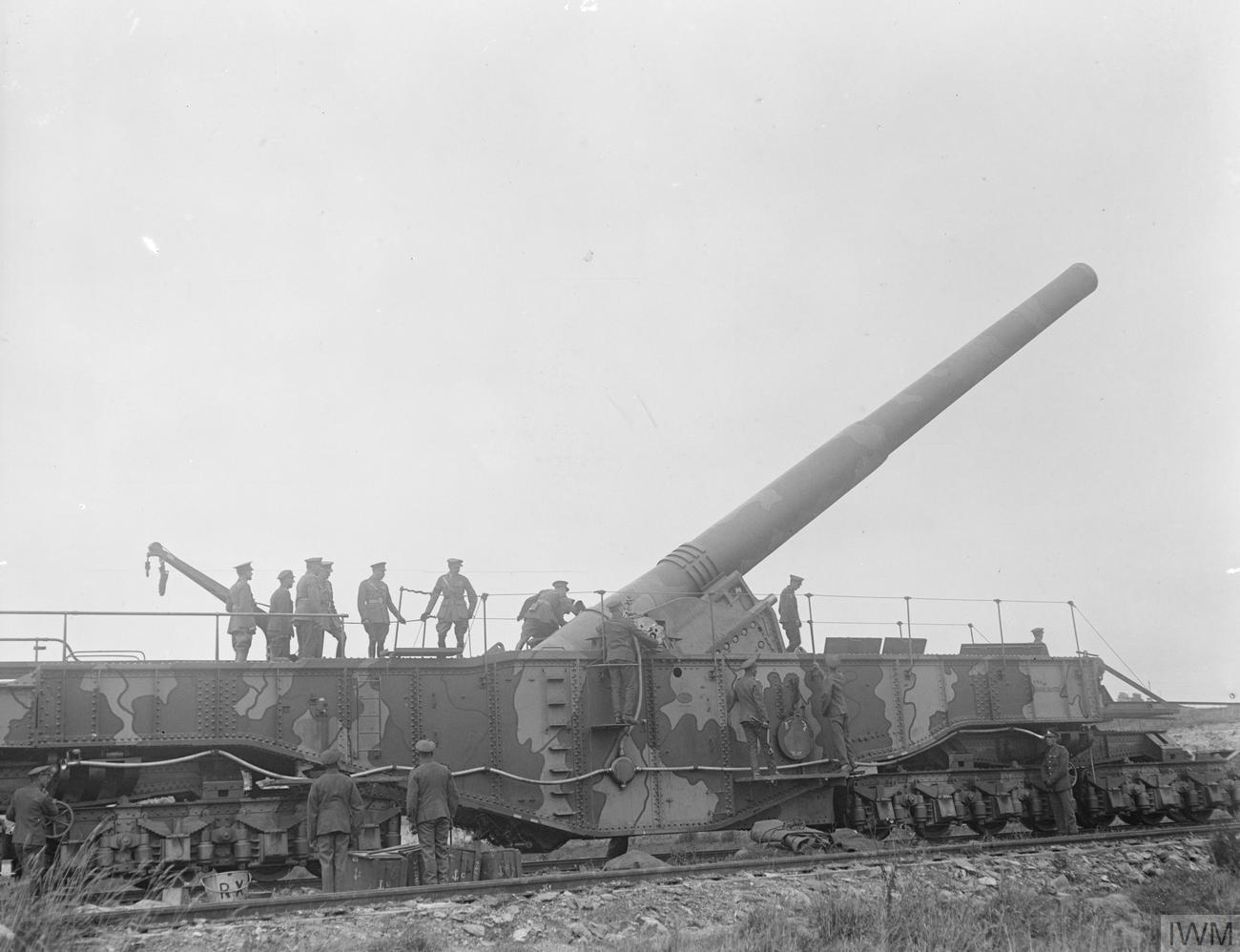
14-inch railway gun inspected by King George V August 1918

Some of the largest guns deployed were the Railway guns, there were sixteen of the smaller BL 9.2-inch Railway Guns in service by the end of the war, which together fired a total of 45,000 rounds. The BL 12-inch railway gun, had the ability to send a 850-pound (390 kg) shell 12 miles (19 km) into the German rear area and was used during the battle of Arras. The largest calibre Railway gun used was the BL 14-inch Railway Gun Boche Buster, which fired its first round in the presence of King George V and scored a direct hit on the Douai railway yards 18 miles (29 km) away.

== See also ==
- British Army during World War I
- List of aircraft of the Royal Flying Corps
- Recruitment to the British Army during World War I
