= Castelo Branco =

Castelo Branco is Portuguese for white castle, and may refer to:

== People ==
- João Rodrigues de Castelo Branco, physician, better known as Amato Lusitano and Amatus Lusitanus (1511–1568)
- Camilo Castelo Branco (1825–1890), Portuguese writer
- Humberto de Alencar Castelo Branco (1897–1967), president of Brazil between 1964 and 1967
- Sérgio Tertuliano Castelo Branco, see List of governors of São Paulo

== Places ==
=== Brazil ===
- Castelo Branco (João Pessoa), a neighbourhood in the municipality of João Pessoa, State of Paraiba

=== Portugal ===
- Castelo Branco (district), a district in the Centro Region
  - Castelo Branco, Portugal, a city in the municipality of Castelo Branco
- Castelo Branco (Mogadouro), a civil parish in Mogadouro Municipality

In the archipelago of the Azores

- Castelo Branco (Horta), a civil parish in the municipality of Horta, island of Faial

== Other ==
- Rodovia Castelo Branco (SP-280), a roadway in the State of São Paulo
- Castelo Branco cheese, a cheese named after the city of the same name in Portugal, the main city of the district where it is produced
- Clube Atlético Castelo Branco, a Brazilian football (soccer) club

== See also ==
- Presidente Castelo Branco (disambiguation)
