= Branco River (disambiguation) =

Branco River a principal affluent of the Rio Negro in South America.

Branco River (English: White River) may also refer to rivers in Brazil and Bolivia:

- Branco ou Cabixi River
- Branco River (Acre)
- Branco River (Aripuanã River)
- Branco River (Bahia)
- Branco River (Guaporé River)
- Branco River (Jaciparaná River)
- Branco River (Jamari River)
- Branco River (Mato Grosso do Sul)
- Branco River (Pará)
- Branco River (Paraná)
- Branco River (Roosevelt River)
- Branco River (São Paulo)

== See also ==
- Rio Branco (disambiguation)
