= Blanco, Ohio =

Unincorporated community in Ohio, U.S.

Coordinates: 41°05′08″N 80°57′34″W

Blanco is an unincorporated community in Mahoning County, in the U.S. state of Ohio.

== History ==
A post office called Blanco was established in 1887, and remained in operation until 1901. Besides the post office, Blanco had a country store.
