= 1908 pattern webbing =

Webbing infantry equipment by the British army

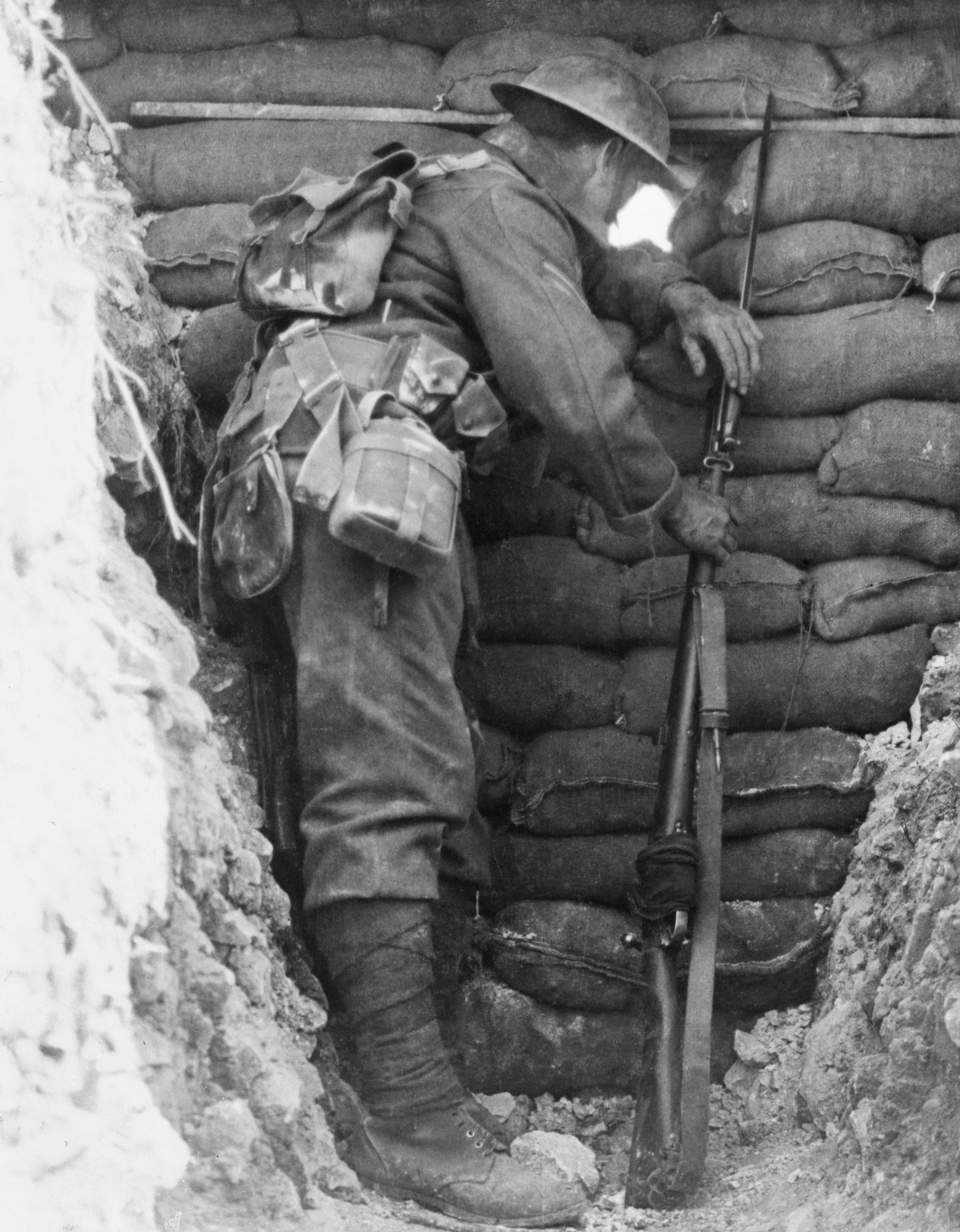
A British soldier in France during the Battle of the Somme, 1916. Visible parts of his 1908 webbing in Battle Order are the haversack, which is being worn on the back in place of the valise, the entrenching tool carrier, the water bottle, and the ammunition pouches towards the front of his waist.

The 1908 pattern web infantry equipment was an innovative type of webbing equipment adopted by the British Army before the First World War. It was devised in response to deficiencies reported in the existing leather personal equipment when used on extended campaigns. It was eventually replaced in the late 1930s, but remained in service with some second-line and British Empire units into the Second World War.

== Origins ==
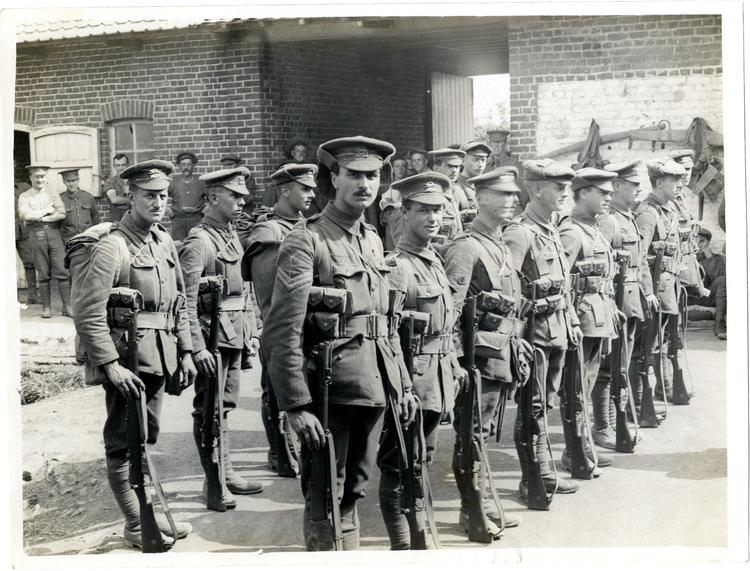
Soldiers of the Leicestershire Regiment in France in 1915, in Full Marching Order. The ammunition pouches can be clearly seen.

During the Second Boer War of 1899–1902, the standard British Army set of personal equipment, comprising a belt, haversack and ammunition pouches, was the leather Slade–Wallace equipment, which had been introduced in 1888. It proved unsuitable for holding modern ammunition, which was carried in stripper clips instead of as individual rounds, and its buffalo-hide leather tended to deteriorate during long periods in the field. A review of British shortcomings during the war was conducted by the 1903 Royal Commission on the War in South Africa, which heard evidence that the Slade–Wallace equipment was "an absurdity" and "cumbersome, heavy and badly balanced". As a stop-gap measure, the leather 1903 Bandolier Equipment, based on that used by the Boer Commandos, was issued, but it quickly proved to be unsuitable for infantry use.

In 1906, Major Arnold R. Burrowes of the Royal Irish Fusiliers, working with the Mills Equipment Company, presented a design for a new set of equipment. Mills' American parent company had previously produced woven cotton webbing equipment for the US Army, but no European army had yet adopted it. The new Mills-Burrowes equipment, initially known as "the Aldershot design", was presented to a committee chaired by the Surgeon-General, which in turn recommended trials at home and abroad. Following the success of these trials, the webbing equipment was accepted by the Army Council in December 1907.

== Description ==
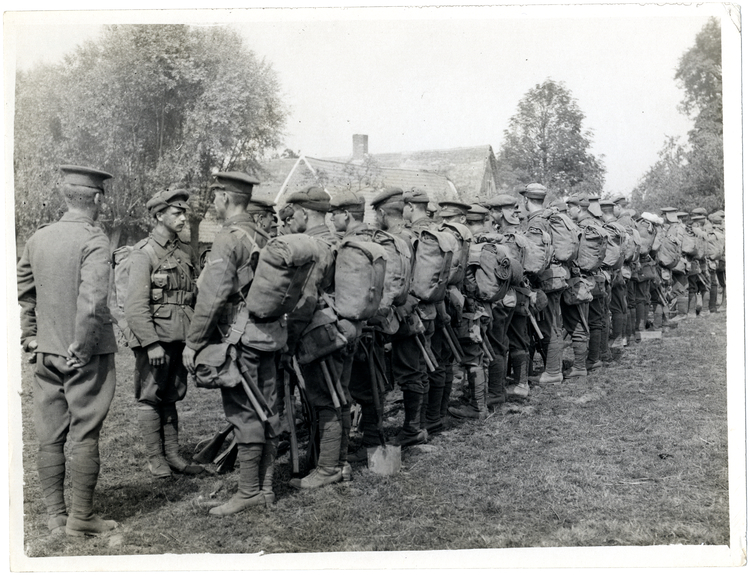
Soldiers from the Leicestershire Regiment in Full Marching Order. The valise or large pack is being worn and the haversack can be seen on the left side. The entrenching tool helve and bayonet scabbard can also be seen.

The 1908 equipment, when fully assembled, formed a single piece, and could be put on or taken off like a jacket. Ammunition was stored in two sets of pouches attached to the belt at the front, and the straps from these passed over the shoulders, crossing diagonally at the back. The large pack, or "valise", or the haversack could be attached to these diagonal straps, thus spreading their weight. The D-shaped buckles and the strap ends were made of brass. The Haversack would have carried: rations, a mess tin, a white towel, wool shirt, wool socks, a holdall, and a rifle cleaning kit. The holdall would have carried a spoon, knife, fork, button stick, shaving brush, hair comb, toothbrush, razor, a bar of soap, and spare boot laces. The whole set consisted of:

- One belt, three inches (76 mm) wide
- Two braces, two inches (51 mm) wide
- Two cartridge pouch sets, each set consisting of five pouches and each pouch holding three five-round stripper clips; 150 rounds of rifle ammunition in total.
- One bayonet frog (a tubular carrier which connected the bayonet scabbard to the belt)
- One water bottle and carrier
- One haversack
- One valise
- Two valise straps
- One entrenching tool with separate carriers for the head and helve

The equipment could be configured in two different ways; for "Full Marching Order" the valise was worn on the back and the haversack was worn hanging at the left hip. In "Battle Order" which was intended to be worn in combat, the valise was detached and the haversack was attached to the back in its place, connected to the ammunition pouches by separate straps. In 1917, an additional haversack in khaki webbing was introduced to hold the Small Box Respirator; it was worn high-up on the chest.

In theory, an infantryman's Full Marching Order weighed 57 pounds 2 1/2 ounces (25.93 kilograms), and the Battle Order weighed 49 pounds 2 ounces (22.3 kilograms), both including the bayonet and 150 rounds of ammunition but excluding the Lee-Enfield rifle. However, in wartime conditions, the addition of new equipment such as the gas mask, steel helmet and hand grenades, together with the need to carry extra ammunition, rations and defence stores, meant that infantrymen could sometimes go into battle carrying loads estimated at up to 114 pounds (52 kilograms).

== Service ==
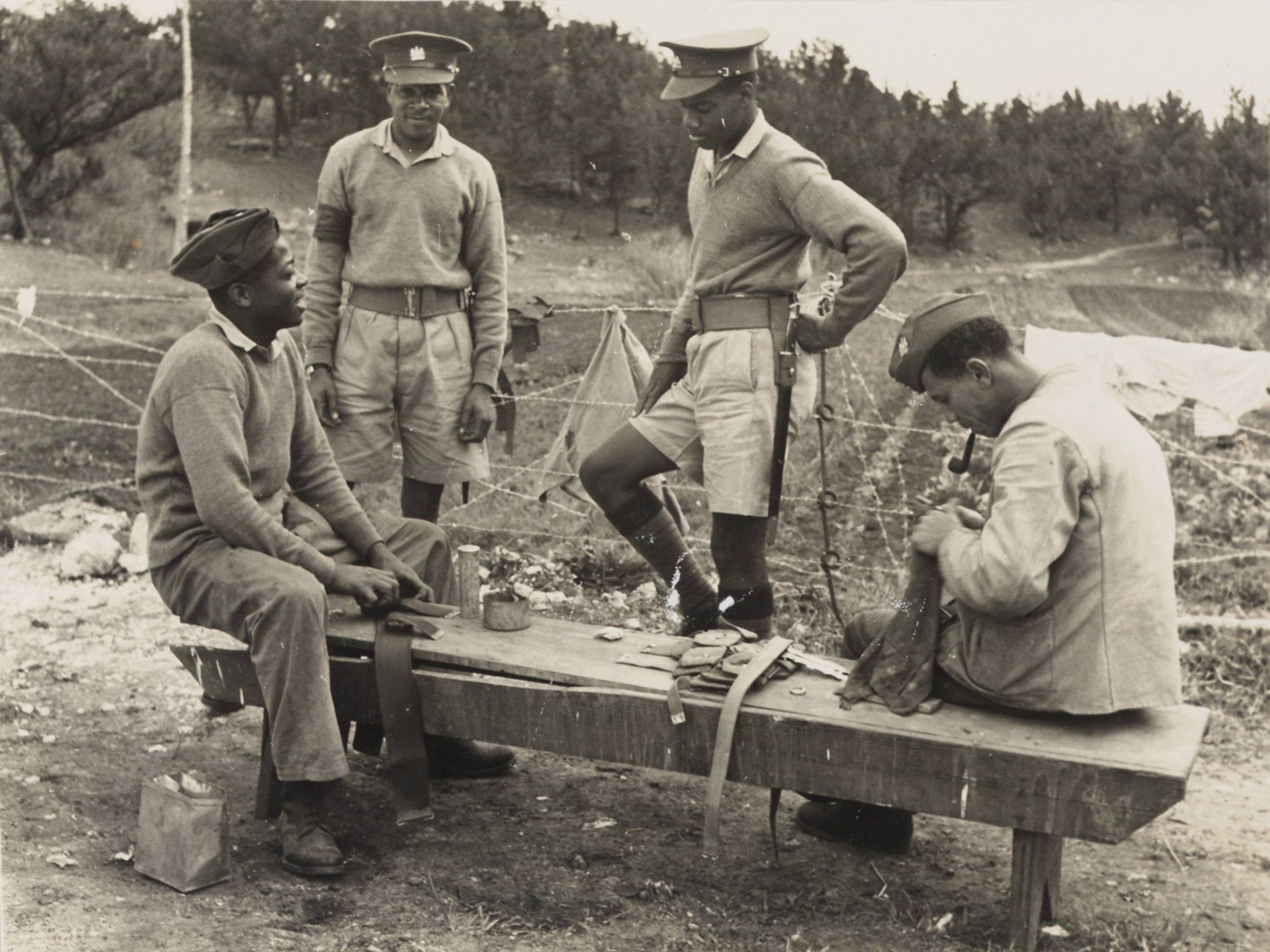
Bermuda Militia Infantry soldiers cleaning 1908 pattern equipment during the Second World War

The 1908 pattern web equipment was the main equipment with which the British and Imperial armies fought the First World War. The inability of the Mills factory to keep up with demand led to the introduction of a leather version, the 1914 Pattern Leather Equipment, which was intended for training and second line troops, but often found its way into the front lines. Twenty years after the end of that conflict, the 1908 webbing was replaced by the 1937 pattern web equipment. However, the massive expansion of the British and Commonwealth armed forces immediately before and after the outbreak of World War II meant that the 1908 webbing continued in front line use for some time. Some British infantry units in India and Hong Kong were still using the 1908 webbing in 1941. The valise from the 1908 webbing continued to be used in the 1937 webbing.
