= Castello Branco =

The name Castello Branco may refer to

- Camilo Castelo Branco (1825–1890); Portuguese writer, publishing over 260 works in this time; committed suicide in 1890.
- Carlos Castello Branco (1920–1993); Brazilian journalist and writer.
- Humberto de Alencar Castelo Branco (1900–1967); Brazilian marshal, involved in the 1964 coup d'état, and President of Brazil from 1964 to 1967.
  - Rodovia Castelo Branco, a Brazilian highway named after him.
