= Presidente Castelo Branco =

Presidente Castelo Branco can refer to:

- Presidente Castelo Branco, Paraná, municipality in the state of Paraná of Brazil
- Presidente Castelo Branco, Santa Catarina, municipality in the state of Santa Catarina in the South region of Brazil

== See also ==
- Humberto de Alencar Castelo Branco, president of Brasil in 1964—1967
