= Mount Rio Branco =

Mountain in Graham Land, Antarctica

Mount Rio Branco (65°25′S 64°0′W) is a mountain, 975 m, standing 2.5 nautical miles (4.6 km) east of Cape Perez on the west coast of Graham Land. Discovered by the French Antarctic Expedition, 1908–10, and named by Charcot for José Paranhos, Baron of Rio Branco, at that time Minister of Foreign Affairs of Brazil.
