= Los Blancos, Salta =

Coordinates: 23°36′S 62°36′W

Los Blancos
- Municipality and village
- Interactive map of Los Blancos
- Country: Argentina
- Province: Salta Province
- Time zone: UTC−3 (ART)

Los Blancos is a village and rural municipality in Salta Province in northwestern Argentina.
