= Brasso =

Metal polish

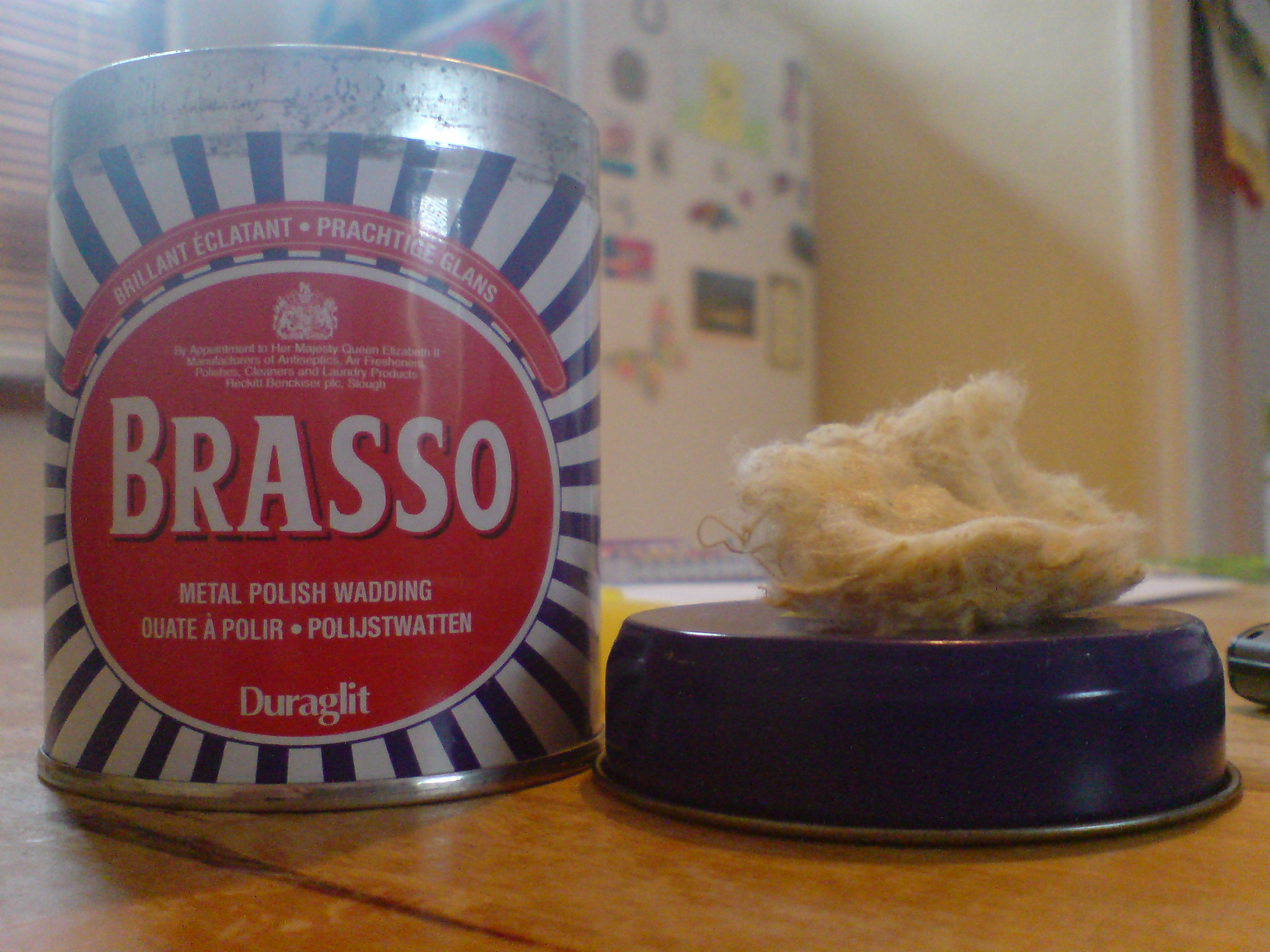
A tin of Brasso Duraglit polish wadding

Brasso is a metal polish designed to remove tarnish from brass, copper, chrome and stainless steel. It is available either directly as a liquid or as an impregnated wadding pad also known as Duraglit.

== History ==
Brasso originated in Britain in about 1905. Reckitt & Sons' senior traveller, W. H. Slack, visited the company's Australian branch, where he discovered such a product in use. Samples from Australian and US producers were then analysed by Reckitt's chemists, and by 1920 liquid polish under the trademark "Brasso" was being sold, initially to railways, hospitals, hotels, and large shops.

Due to the hydrocarbon components in the mixture, it had a flash point of 72 °F (22 °C) (Abel Close test) and so was classified as a dangerous good by Britain's railway companies. This classification allowed them to charge more for transporting Brasso around the country. Reckitt's appealed to the companies asking for the polish to be recategorised in the hope of reducing costs, but the railways disagreed. As a result, in 1913 the case was taken to the Railway and Canal Commissioners for a decision; after a two day hearing, the commissioners decided in favour of the railways, and Brasso remained classed as a dangerous substance for the purposes of railway transport.

The polish grew in popularity in Britain, becoming widely available, eventually replacing the previous paste-style polishes. It has undergone very few changes in either composition or package design over the past century. Cans are often collected as a typical example of classic British advertising design.

In the US, the current Brasso product is not the same as the legacy product. The manufacturer, Reckitt Benckiser, has not produced the impregnated wadding version of the product for many years. The formula changed in 2008 to comply with US volatile organic compounds law, and the metal bottle was replaced by a plastic one.

In 2010, Brasso brought out a new product, Brasso Gadgetcare. Gadgetcare is a versatile, non-abrasive gel that can be used on everything from LCD TV screens, laptop screens, computers, smart phones, and PDAs. The plastic bottle is 50 ml (1.7 US fl oz) and is sold with a microfibre cloth.

== Ingredients ==
The label of Australian Brasso lists "Liquid Hydrocarbons 630g/L; Ammonia 7g/L", whereas the material safety data sheet for Brasso in North America lists: isopropyl alcohol 3–5%, ammonia 5–10%, silica powder 15–20% and oxalic acid 0–3% as the ingredients. The Australian version also contains silica (silicon dioxide) for abrasives.

The online data sheet for Brasso wadding in the UK lists the ingredients as C8–10 Alkane/Cycloalkane/Aromatic Hydrocarbons, Quartz, C14–18 and C16–18 unsaturated Fatty acids, Kaolinite, Aqua, Ammonium Hydroxide and Iron Hydroxide. Brasso liquid lists a slightly different mix; C8–10 Alkane/Cycloalkane/Aromatic Hydrocarbons, Quartz, Kaolin, C12–20 Saturated and Unsaturated Monobasic Fatty Acids, Aqua and Ammonium Hydroxide. Also available are ingredients in a discontinued recipe for Brasso. Wadding: C8–10 Alkane/Cycloalkane/Aromatic Hydrocarbons, Quartz, Ammonium Tallate and Colorant. Liquid: C8–10 Alkane/Cycloalkane/Aromatic Hydrocarbons, Quartz, Kaolin and Ammonium Tallate.

Brasso is abrasive and will wear metal over time. The National Trust recommend alternative cleaners.

== Other applications ==
Brasso has also been used to polish out scratches in plastics:

- It has been used to polish CDs, DVDs, screens, and pools to repair scratches. It is a mild solvent and an extremely fine abrasive, so when applied to the reflective surface of the disc and rubbed radially (in straight lines between the edge and centre), it can smooth scratches and reduce their effect.
- Brasso has been used on Lego minifigures to remove markings.
- Brasso has been used by watch enthusiasts to polish scratches out of acrylic crystals on watches.
- Brasso can also be used to restore Bakelite (telephones, old radios, etc.)

Brasso has been successfully used to take minor (white) heat marks out of French polished wooden surfaces. The fine abrasive cuts through the surface and allows the solvent into the wax and lacquer layer. The surface should be properly cleaned and waxed after this treatment.

Brasso, on account of its ammonia content, has been used as a de-coppering agent in rifle barrels to remove copper fouling.

== See also ==
- List of cleaning products
- "Shine Your Buttons with Brasso", a bawdy popular song
