= White pipe clay =

White-firing clay to make smoking pipes

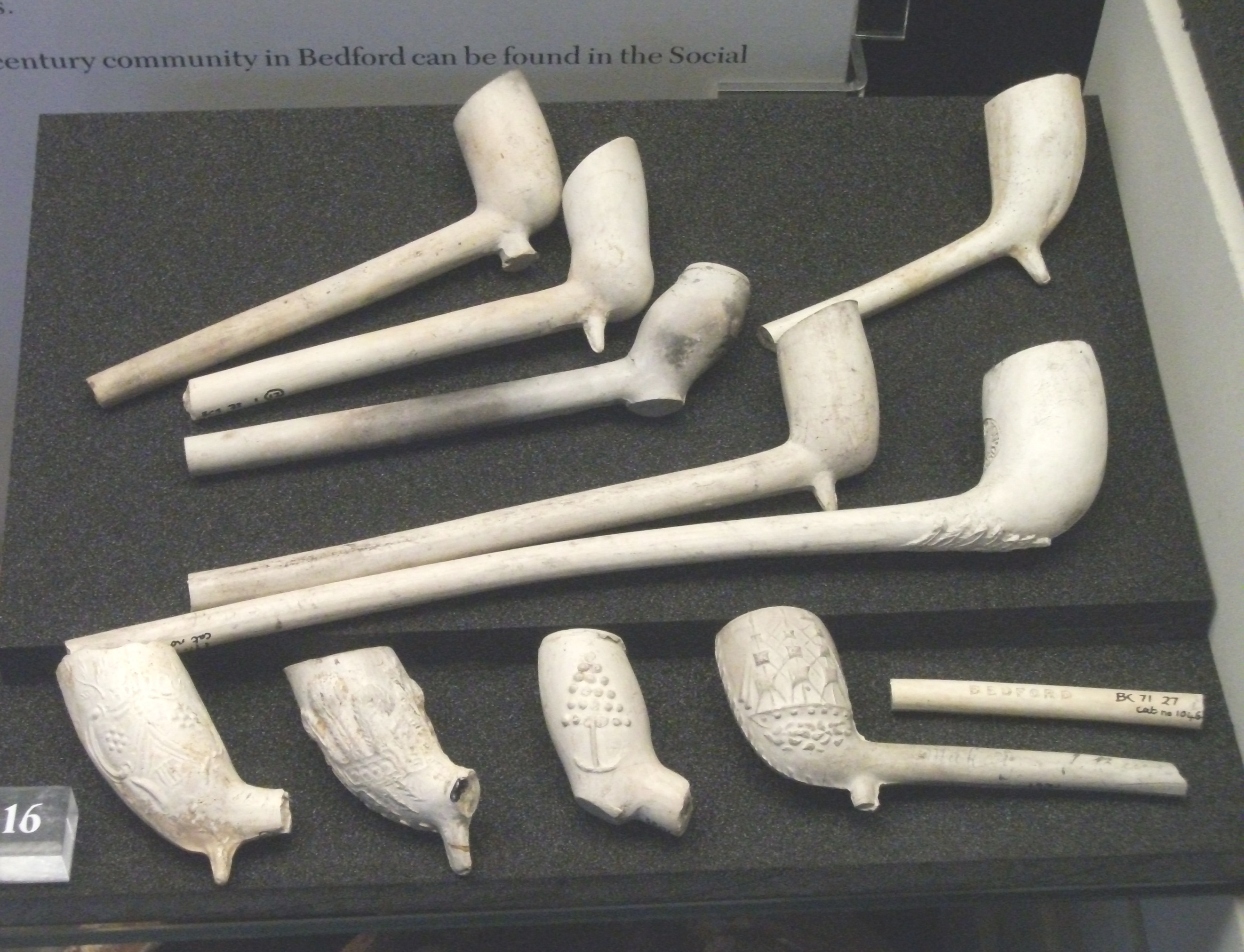
A group of English clay pipes, from the early 17th to late 19th century, none complete, Bedford Museum, 2010

White pipe clay is a white-firing clay of the sort that is used to make tobacco smoking pipes. The clay was originally used to make small white devotional figurines in the Low Countries of Europe.

== Distribution ==
The clay was found in deposits of the Rhine and Meuse rivers, and in the 16th-century centres of production for white pipe clay objects were Cologne, Utrecht, Liège, and Gouda, South Holland (known as pijpaarde in Dutch).

In England, pipe clays are found in Devon and Dorset,

== Uses ==
=== Devotional figures ===
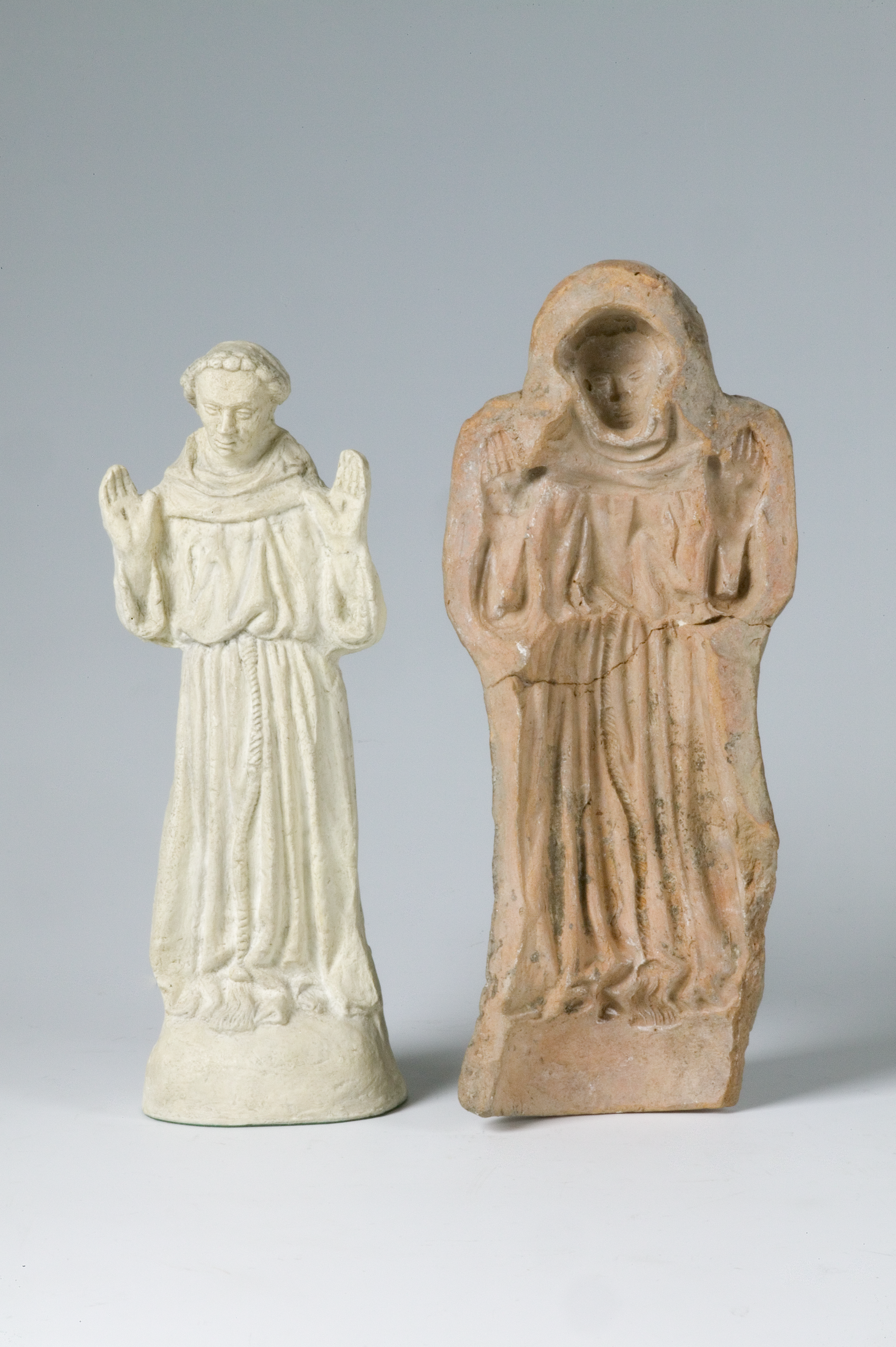
Small St. Francis figurine with mould, from the Oude Varkenmarkt dig in Leiden, ca. 1475–1499, Museum Catharijneconvent

In archaeological digs in the Netherlands, small white devotional figurines have been found, and several digs in cities have uncovered the moulds used to press these small figurines. Forty figurines and twenty-eight parts of figurines were discovered on the Oude Varkenmarkt in Leiden in a cesspit dating to the middle of the 15th century.

=== Pipes ===
The name comes from the most common usage of white pipe clay, tobacco pipes.

The Gouda pipe (Goudse pijp) was a long-stemmed white tobacco pipe made in Gouda in the same way as the old figurines in a pressed mould. They became popular with the import of tobacco through the Dutch East India Company and later the Dutch West India Company. The pipes can be seen in a number of 17th-century paintings and are regularly found in archaeological digs in the Netherlands. They were continuously produced up to the 20th century.

Dutch film demonstrating how Gouda pipes were made in 1951

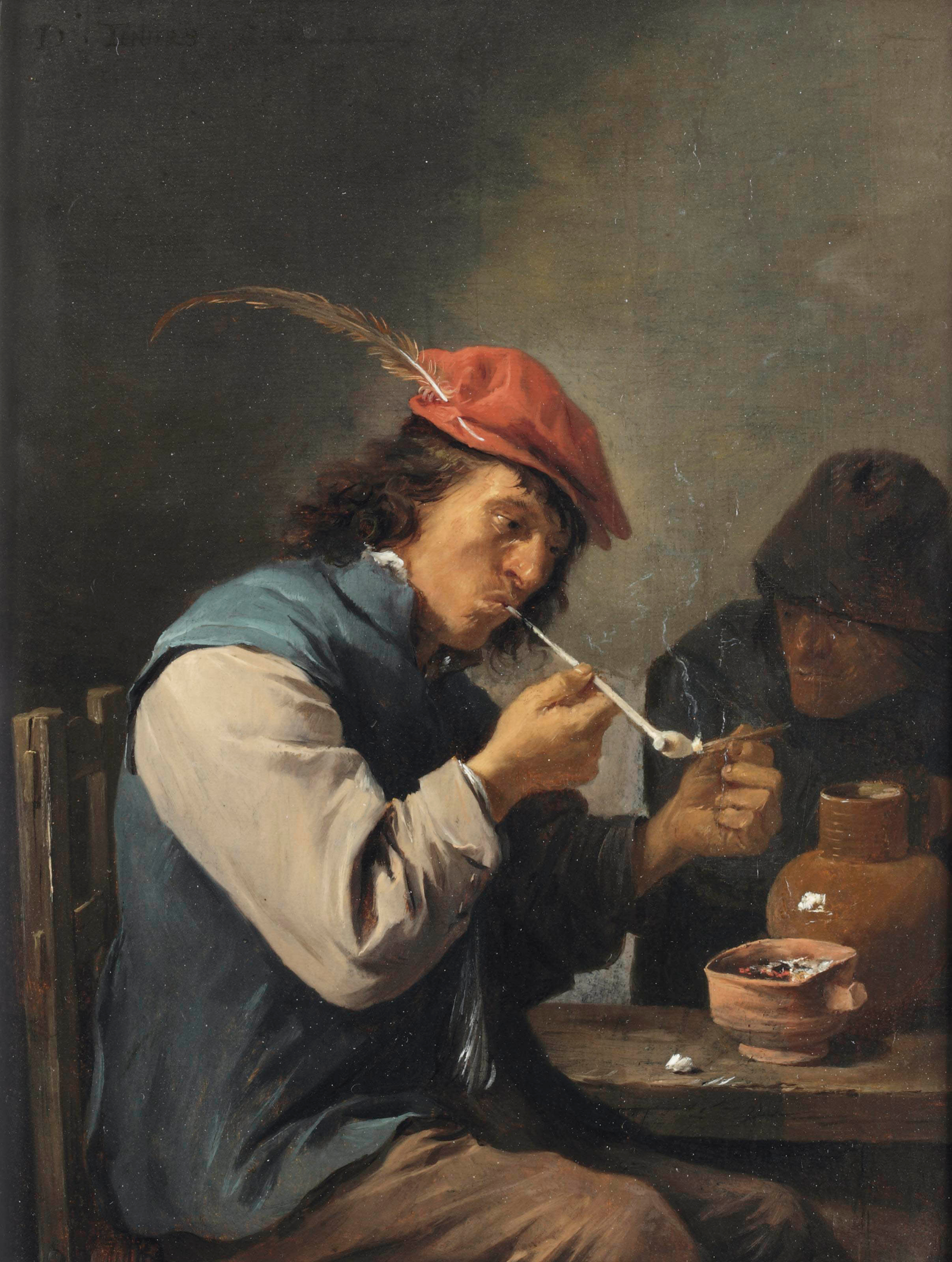
One of many paintings of smokers by David Teniers the Younger

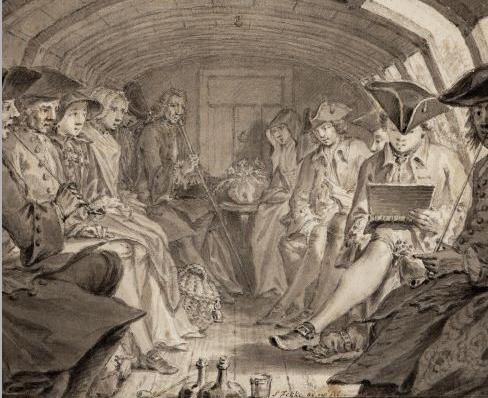
Passengers in a trekschuit smoking on the Haarlemmertrekvaart to avoid the stench of the canals, dated 1760 drawing by Simon Fokke

In the 1911 Encyclopædia Britannica, Gouda was still known for its churchwarden pipes and even mentioned a winter pastime of skating while smoking from Rotterdam to Gouda without breaking such pipes.

== See also ==
- Clay pipe dating
