= Mercury Stardust =

American TikToker, activist, and educator

- Born: December 8, 1987 (age 38); Madison, Wisconsin, U.S.
- Other name: "Trans Handy Ma'am"
- Occupations: Home repair educator, TikToker, activist, burlesque performer
- Years active: 2021–present

TikTok information
- Page: Mercury Stardust
- Years active: 2021–present
- Genre: Educational
- Followers: 2.6 million

YouTube information
- Channel: Mercury Stardust
- Genre: Educational
- Subscribers: 270 thousand
- Views: 38 million
- Last updated: October 12, 2025
- Website: mercurystardust.com

Mercury Stardust (born December 8, 1987) is an American author, TikToker, transgender activist, burlesque performer, and home repair educator. Known on TikTok as the "Trans Handy Ma'am", she provides advice on DIY home repair.

== Life ==
Stardust grew up on a farm in northern Wisconsin, where she learned maintenance skills from her father, a truck driver and farmworker. In college, she studied theater and became a cabaret performer. Stardust took an internship as a maintenance technician at the age of 19, while traveling and performing in gay bars on weekends. In 2015, Stardust founded the Wisconsin Burlesque Association.

Stardust chose her name in 2014. She came out as a trans woman in 2019. Her spouse, Ari, is non-binary.

== Career ==
Stardust began posting on TikTok in March 2021. Initially using the platform to promote her weekly burlesque show in Madison, she shifted her focus after going viral in April 2021 for a video explaining how to use a ratchet strap. Her content largely focuses on home repair and DIY solutions to common household problems, earning her the nickname "Trans Handy Ma'am". She reached one million followers by July 2021 and 1.5 million by February 2022, at which point online content creation became her full time job. As of September 2023, Stardust had over two million followers. She received the 2021 Trans* Activist of the Year award from the OutReach LGBTQ Community Center.

In March 2022, Stardust hosted the first TikTok-a-Thon for Trans Healthcare, coinciding with International Transgender Day of Visibility, during which she raised more than $120,000 for Plume, an organization which funds gender-affirming care. During the event's second iteration in March 2023, she co-hosted a 30-hour livestream on both TikTok and Twitch to raise money for Point of Pride, another organization which funds gender-affirming care for transgender individuals. Guests for the event included V Spehar. The livestream raised over $100,000 in its first hour and $1 million in its first six hours. In total the event raised over $2 million. In March 2024, the event's third iteration aimed to raised $4 million for Point of Pride, with appearances from guests including Ve'ondre Mitchell and Dylan Mulvaney. However, within the first ten hours of the event, Stardust's and co-host Jory (Alluring Skull)'s TikTok accounts were banned nine times due to mass reporting from trolls, resulting in multiple interruptions.

Since November 2022, Stardust has hosted the podcast Handy Ma'am Hotline, where she discusses home maintenance. In April 2023, Stardust announced that she had authored a book, Safe and Sound: A Renter-Friendly Guide to Home Repair, set to be published on August 29, 2023 by Penguin Random House. Within a few days of its presale, the book became a #1 bestseller in Amazon's Home Repair category. In August 2023, the book became a New York Times Best Seller. Stardust went on a 52-city book tour in the United States in fall 2023.
