= Strap =

Strip of flexible material

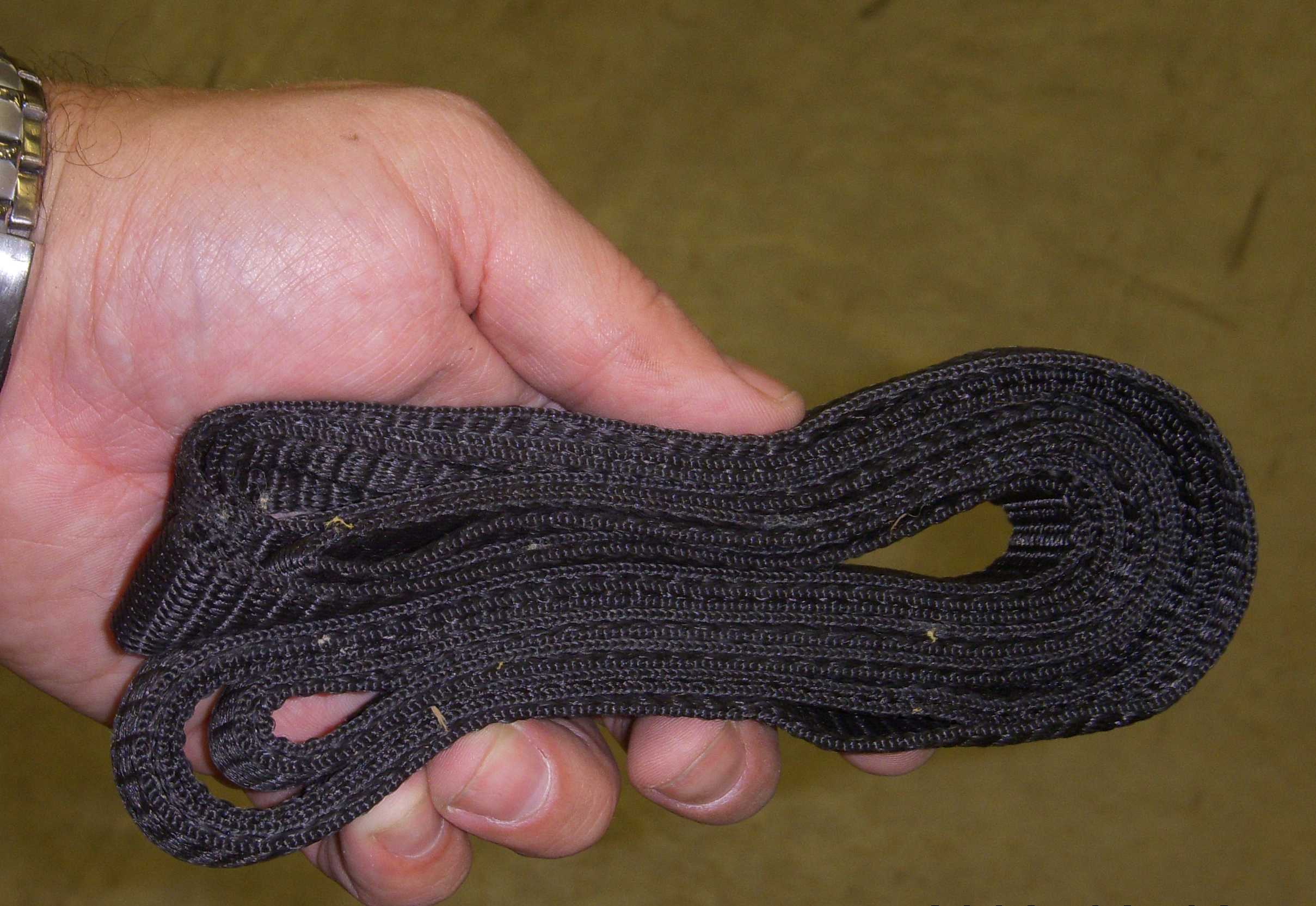
Folded strap

A strap, sometimes also called strop, is an elongated flap or ribbon, usually of leather or other flexible materials.

Thin straps are used as part of clothing or baggage, or bedding such as a sleeping bag. See for example spaghetti strap, shoulder strap. A strap differs from a belt mainly in that a strap is usually integral to the item of clothing; either can be used in combination with buckles.

Straps are also used as fasteners to attach, secure, carry, or bind items, to objects, animals (for example a saddle on a horse) and people (for example a watch on a wrist), or even to tie down people and animals, as on an apparatus for corporal punishment. Occasionally a strap is specified after what it binds or holds, e.g. chin strap. Webbing is a particular type of strap that is a strong fabric woven as a flat strip or tube that is also often used in place of rope. Modern webbing is typically made from exceptionally high-strength material and is used in automobile seat belts, furniture manufacturing, transportation, towing, military uniform, cargo fasteners, and many other fields.

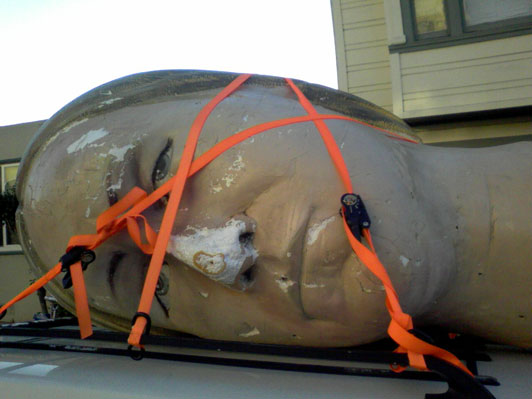
On car roof

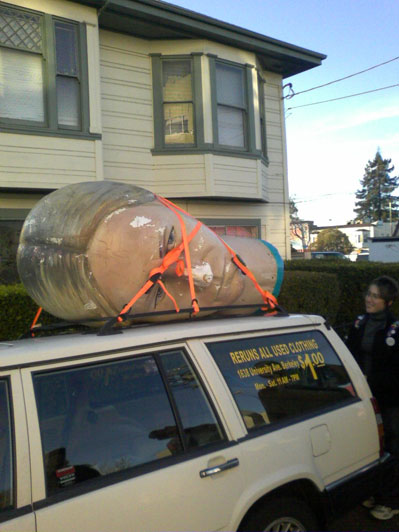
Strap-down method

== Components ==
- Strap loop
- Strap union
- Strap fitting

== Packaging ==
The strap is commonly used in the packaging industry to secure or fasten items. It may be made from a wide range of materials, such as plastic, steel, paper, or fabric. Usually, the strap is secured to itself through various means, but it may also be secured to other items, such as pallets.

== Gallery ==
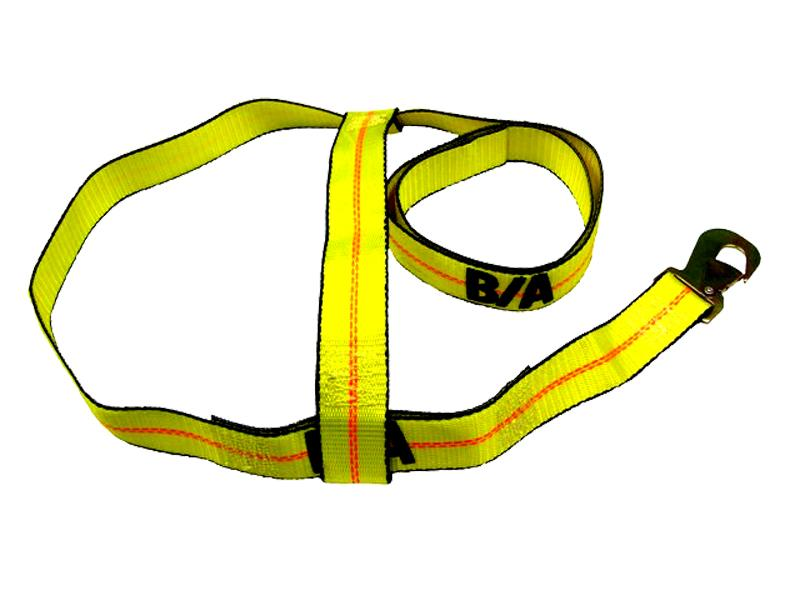
Basket strap

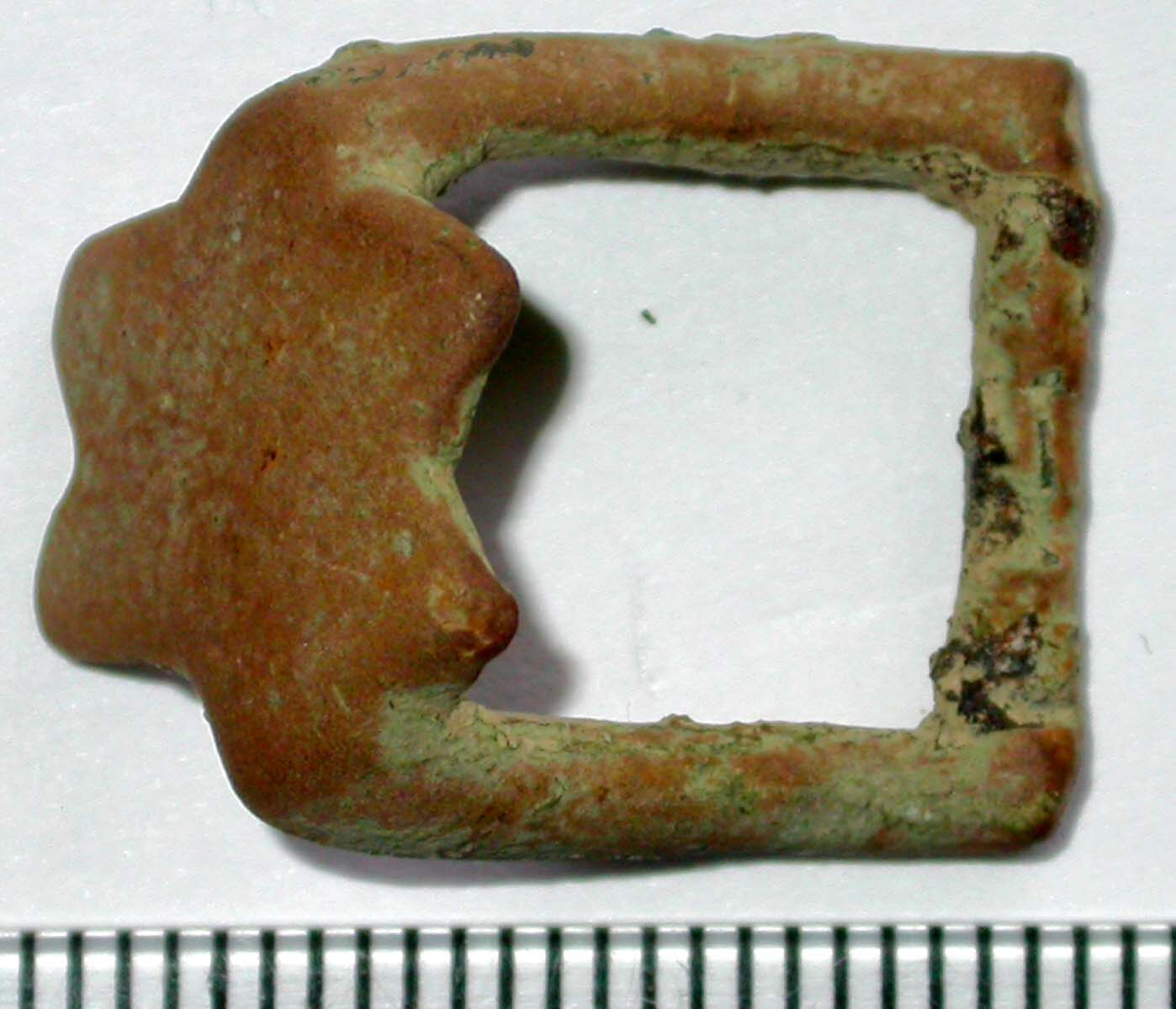
Medieval strap loop

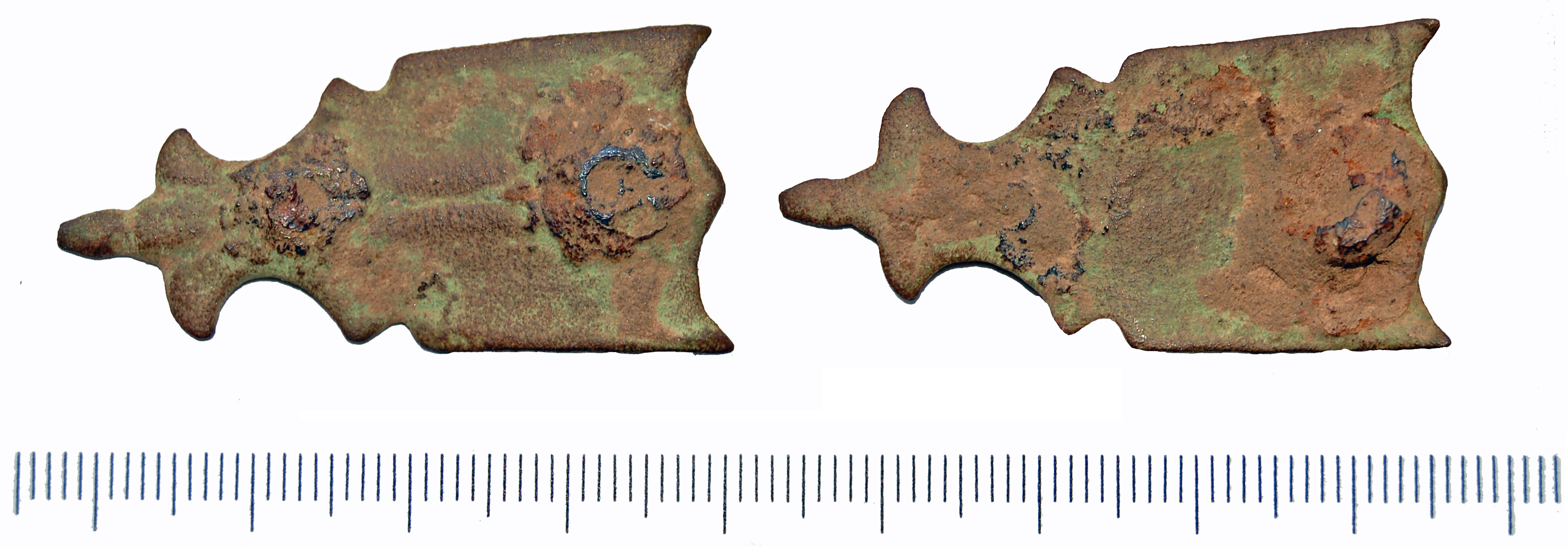
Post-Medieval strap fitting

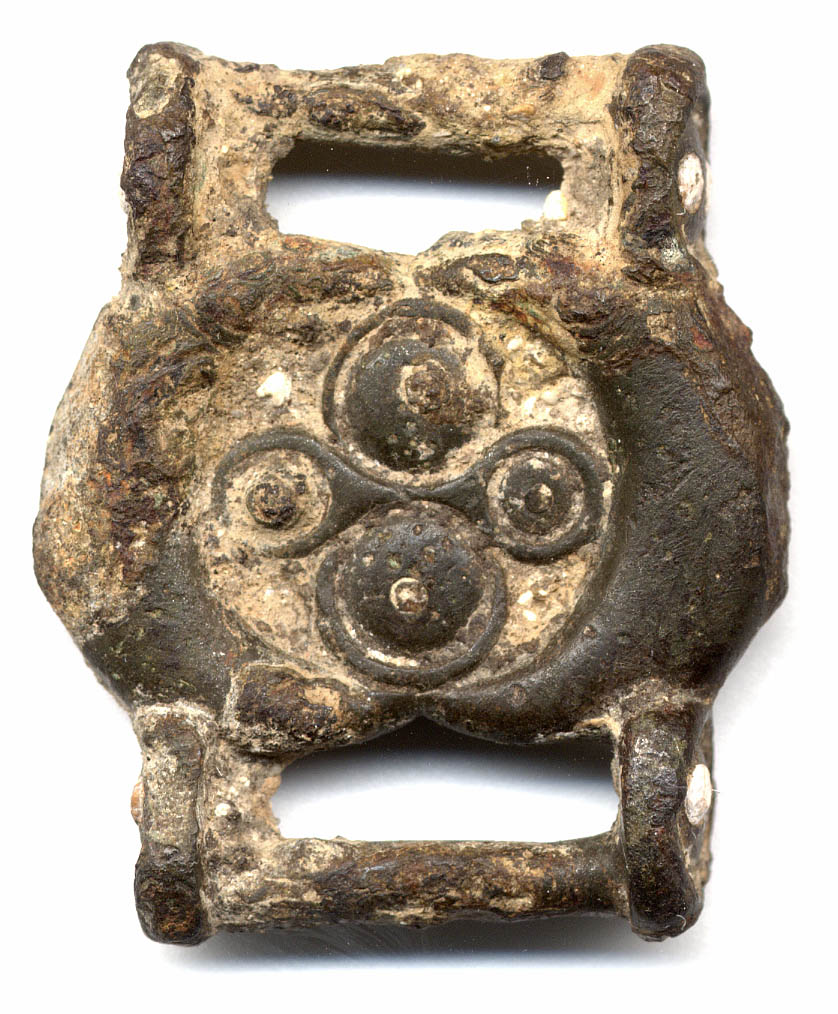
Iron Age strap union

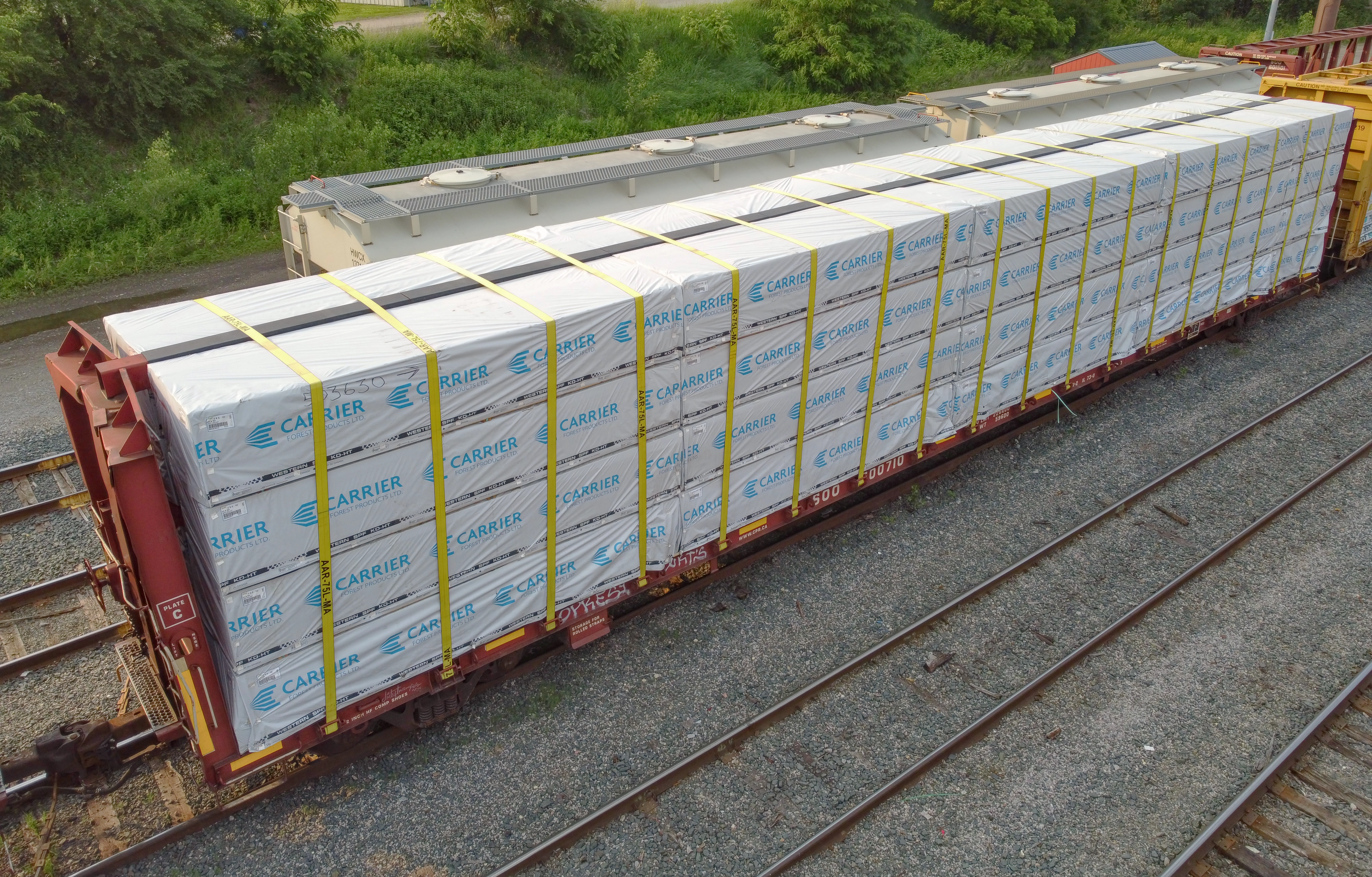
Centerbeam flatcar with polyester rolled straps

== See also ==
- Buckle
- Drawstring
- Watch strap
- Phone strap
- Snap fastener
- Strapping (punishment)
- Hook and loop fastener
- Ratchet strap
