= Webbing =

Strong fabric woven as a flat strip or tube used instead of rope

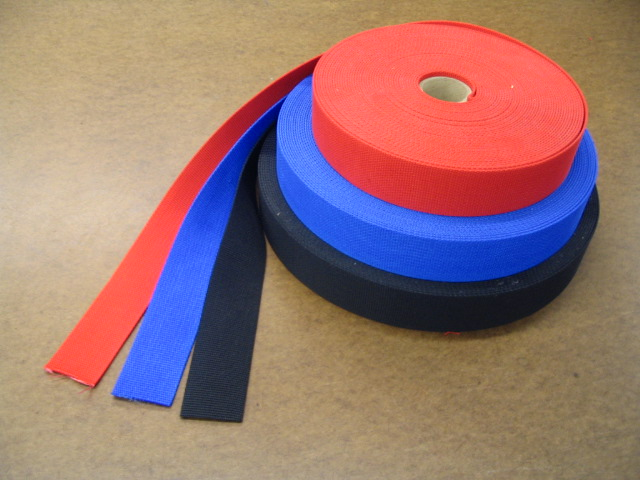
50 mm (2 in) red, blue and black nylon webbing as used in auto racing harnesses

Webbing is a strong fabric woven as a flat strip or tube of varying width and fibres, often used in place of rope. It is a versatile component used in climbing, slacklining, furniture manufacturing, automobile safety, auto racing, towing, parachuting, military apparel, load securing, and many other fields.

It may be made of hemp, cotton or linen, but also synthetic fibers such as nylon, polypropylene or polyester. Webbing is also made from exceptionally high-strength material, such as Dyneema, and Kevlar. Webbing is both light and strong, with breaking strengths readily available in excess of 10,000 pounds-force (44 kilonewtons).

There are two basic constructions of webbing. Flat webbing is a solid weave, with seat belts and most backpack straps being common examples. Tubular webbing consists of a flattened tube, and is commonly used in climbing and industrial applications.

== Materials ==
Some examples of common webbing materials are:

- Polypropylene, a lightweight and economical material with a soft feel. Typically with a thickness of about 2 mm (3/36 in).
- Cotton reinforced with nylon ("extra strength cotton"), a thicker and stronger webbing. Typically with a thickness of about 1.5 mm (1/16 in).
- Ultra abrasion resistant nylon, a very dense weave which requires more advanced tools to work with. Typically with a thickness of about 2 mm (3/36 in).

== Uses ==
=== Sporting goods ===
In rock climbing, nylon webbing is used in slings, runners, harnesses, anchor extensions, and quickdraws. Webbing is used in many ways in hiking and camping gear including backpacks, straps, load adjusters and tent adjusters. There are two types of webbing: tubular and flat.

The most popular webbing width is 25 mm (1 in) but 38 mm (1.5 in) and 50 mm (2 in) are also very common. Narrower webbing is frequently looped through chock stones, which are jammed into cracks as safety anchors. In other cases, webbing is looped over rock outcroppings. Webbing is less likely to loosen itself off the rock than tubular rope. Note that webbing construction is either utterly flat or flat-tubular; the latter tends to handle better but knots are more likely to jam.

The most popular knots in webbing are the water knot and the grapevine knot. The latter is stronger, but uses more webbing for the knot. It is customary to leave a few centimetres extending from the knot, and in many cases climbers tape the ends down onto the main loops.

Webbing is also less expensive than rope of similar size, particularly kernmantle rope, which requires elaborate and expensive manufacturing. Unlike climbing rope, which is generally sold with recognizable brand names, webbing manufacture is typically generic. Climbing shops sell it off of a spool on a per yard or per foot basis.

Webbing is cut with a hot wire as is nylon rope, which prevents fraying and unravelling. However, when webbing does fray and unravel, the result is less disastrous than with rope, providing a modest advantage. Webbing suffers the drawback of less elasticity than perlon rope, and it may be more difficult to handle with gloves or mittens on.

Slacklines often use flat or tubular 25 mm (1 in) webbing, or flat 50 mm (2 in) webbing. Other widths are used, but are less common.

White water rafting boats use tubular webbing for bow lines, stern lines, "chicken lines" (around the exterior perimeter of the boat), equipment tie down, or floor lacing for self-bailing rafts. Rafters call tubular webbing "hoopie" or "hoopi". Rafters also use camstraps with flat webbing for equipment tie down.

Life preservers are also crafted using nylon or cotton webbing that conforms to federal standards and guidelines.

=== Automotive and racing safety ===
Seat belts are an obvious example of webbings used in auto safety but there are myriad other uses. Nylon and polyester webbing are used a great deal in auto racing safety for a large variety of items. Racing harnesses restraining the driver have used nylon webbing for years, but since the death of Dale Earnhardt, polyester webbing is becoming more popular due to its increased strength, and lower rate of elongation under load. The nylon commercial type 9 webbing generally used in racing harnesses stretches approximately 20 to 30 percent of its initial length at 11 kN (2,500 lbf) while polyester only stretches 5 to 15 percent. Window nets to prevent objects from entering the driver compartment are constructed of polypropylene webbing, as are helmet nets used to reduce side loads to the head in Sprint cars. The HANS device uses webbing tethers to attach the helmet to the collar, and the Hutchens device is made almost entirely of webbing.

=== Furniture ===
Webbing is used in couches and chairs as a base for the seating areas that is both strong and flexible. Webbing used as a support is often rubberised to improve resilience and add elasticity. Many types of outdoor furniture use little more than thin light webbing for the seating areas. Webbing is also used to reinforce joints and areas that tend to flex.

=== Military ===
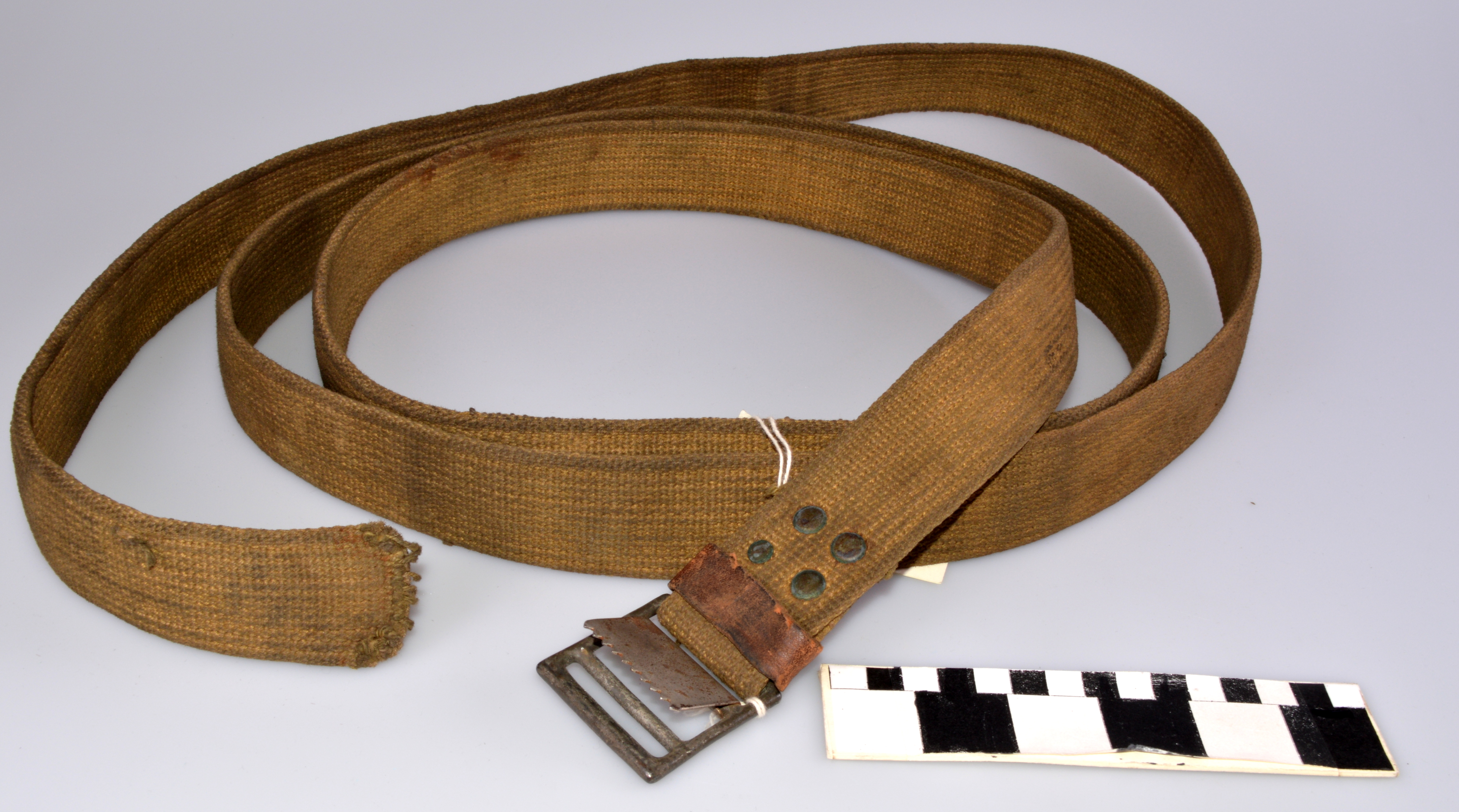
World War I canvas webbing strap

Pattern for PALS and MOLLE grids of webbing, which are based on 25 mm (1 in) wide webbing with 38 mm (1.5 in) spacing between each sewing point.

Military webbing, or web gear otherwise known as Mil-Spec webbing, is typically made of strips of woven narrow fabrics of high tensile strength, such as nylon, Kevlar, and Nomex. When these materials are used for parachute and ballooning applications, they must also conform to PIA (Parachute Industry Association) standards.

Mil-Spec webbing is used to make military belts, packs, pouches, and other forms of equipment. The British Army adopted cotton webbing to replace leather after the Second Boer War although leather belts are still worn in more formal dress. The term is still used for a soldier's combat equipment, although cotton webbing has since been replaced with stronger materials. The webbing system used by the British Army today is known as personal load carrying equipment. Americans use modular lightweight load-carrying equipment (MOLLE).

Typical contents of military webbing equipment include cooking equipment, 24 hours' worth of rations, water, ammunition, first aid or survival supplies, cold weather/rain gear, anti-gas/CBRN gear and sheltering equipment (such as a tent quarter/shelter half, poles, rope, etc.). Items are generally stored in an ordered fashion in a combination of ammo and utility pouches.

It is unusual for western armies to fight while wearing a pack, and so prior to anticipated contact with the enemy the pack is usually stowed away from the forward edge of the battle area and webbing is used instead. Webbing belts are also used frequently by modern cadet and scout groups, as well as police and security forces.

=== Transportation ===
The transportation industry uses webbing to secure cargo. Examples include Tie downs, tie straps, cargo straps, E-track straps, cargo hoist straps, tow ropes, winch straps and cargo nets.

=== Apparel ===
Belts, suspenders/braces, sandals and handbags/purses are woven from various forms of webbing. Corset-style back braces and other medical braces often incorporate straps made from webbing.

=== Pet harnesses and leashes ===
Pet harnesses and leashes frequently utilize webbing. These products are often sewn together with cotton fabric.

=== Hardware ===
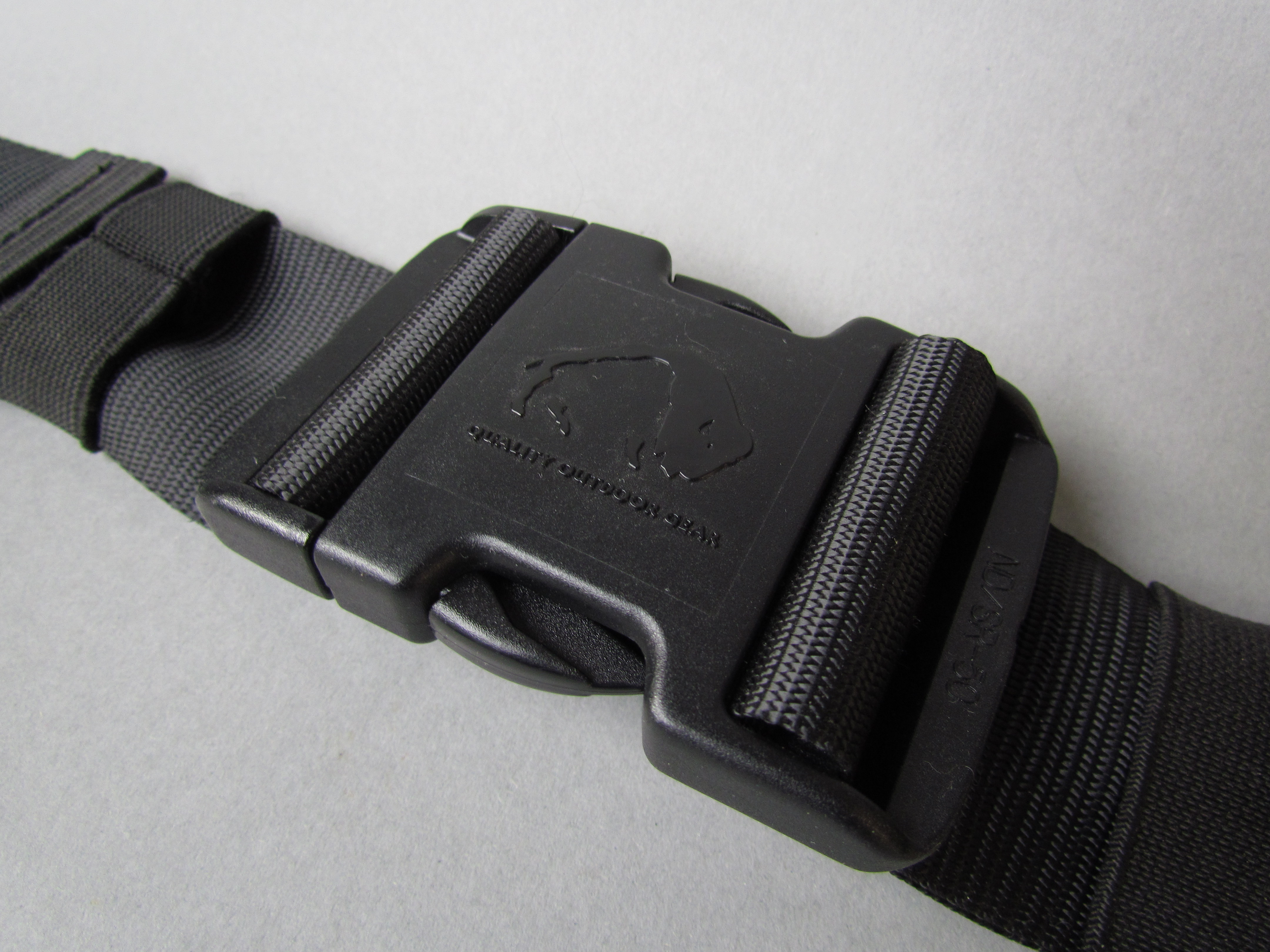
A buckled side release buckle attached to webbing

Webbing is often outfitted with various forms of tie down hardware to extend its range of abilities (and create tie down straps). This hardware can take the form of:

- End fittings (S-hooks, snap hooks, bolt/anchor plates, J-hooks, flat hooks, etc.)
- Fasteners (over-center, cam, ratchet, etc.)
- Buckles (slide buckles, snap buckles, etc.)

There is also hardware associated with the various end fittings to attach them to a surface, such as footman loops, brackets and E-track fittings.

While webbing sizes in general are standardized, buckles in general are proprietary. Therefore, if one part of a buckle breaks (i.e. female or male end) both parts usually have to be replaced (female and male end).

=== Construction ===
In the construction industry, webbing is typically made from high-tenacity polyester or nylon fibers. It is used to lift and move heavy objects like steel beams, concrete blocks, and other building materials. In particular, flat webbing slings are commonly employed for lifting equipment.

== See also ==
- Blanco (compound)
- List of webbing equipment
- MOLLE
- Personal load carrying equipment
- Safety harness
- Seat belt
- Strapping
- Tie down straps
- Tie down hardware
