= TikTok-a-Thon for Trans Healthcare =

Annual virtual fundraiser

- Founded: 2022
- Founder: Mercury Stardust
- Type: Fundraiser
- Purpose: Transgender health care
- Location: TikTok
- Region served: Worldwide
- Method: Fundraiser on TikTok and Twitch
- Website: www.pointofpride.org/keepup

The TikTok-a-Thon for Trans Healthcare is a yearly fundraiser to raise money for transgender health care. The fundraiser is a livestream organised by trans TikTok influencers Mercury Stardust and alluringskull to fundraise for the mutual aid nonprofit Point of Pride. The fundraiser is organised for March 31, International Transgender Day of Visibility and has raised over $4 million.

== Description ==
The fundraiser is hosted by Mercury Stardust, known as the Trans Handy Ma'am, and a TikToker named Jory, known as alluringskull. The TikTok-a-Thon for Trans Healthcare guests has included the Point of Pride cofounder Aydian Dowling, Dylan Mulvaney, Mama Tot, V Spehar, makeup artist Darius Hall, Ve'ondre Mitchell, and Zaya Perysian.

The campaign raises funds for transgender healthcare provided by the nonprofit organization Point of Pride, an organization that provides gender-affirming care. The care funded by the fundraiser includes; chest binders, femme shapewear, hormone therapy, telehealth access, permanent hair removal and gender-affirming surgery. 90% of funds are used to support trans healthcare through Point of Pride's Gender Affirming Care Access scholarships and grants. Stardust has said about the event: "In a time that often feels like it is hard for us to even exist publicly, it's nice to have a refreshing moment of hope."

In 2022, Stardust and Jory hosted the first "TikTok-a-thon" to coincide with International Transgender Day of Visibility on March 31. Originally aiming to raise $24,000, it raised more than $120,000. The 2023 fundraiser was a 30-hour livestream on both TikTok and Twitch. The livestream raised more than $100,000 in its first hour and $1 million in its first six hours. In total, the event raised more than $2 million from 57,500 donors. For 2024, Point of Pride set a fundraising goal of $4 million. Within the first ten hours of the event, Stardust's and Jory's TikTok accounts were banned nine times due to mass reporting from trolls, resulting in multiple interruptions. As of April 9, 2024, the fundraiser has raised $2 million.
