= Transit bolt =

Type of bolt

Transit bolts are a type of bolt used to secure part of a mechanical appliance during transit. They are typically 4 to 12 in (100 to 300 mm) in length, although any size is possible as it depends on the type of device being transported.

The most common example of transit bolts is the securing of the drum of a washing machine while it is transported from shop to property (or property to property). The drum of a washing machine is weighted and would damage the electronic internals if it were to swing into them while being transported.

Failing to remove transit bolts before using the machine can also damage the machine.

== See also ==
- Load securing, fasteners
- Cargo, stabilisation
