= Web lashing assembly =

Load securing webbing

A web lashing assembly (commonly referred to as a tie-down strap, ratchet strap, or lashing strap) is a device used to secure cargo or equipment on road vehicles. Such assemblies are made from man-made fibre webbing and include end fittings that allow the assembly to attach to anchor points, loop over cargo, or connect directly to the cargo. They typically incorporate a tensioning mechanism, such as a ratchet, to apply pre-tension and maintain the load securely during transport. EN 12195-2 specifies the strength, construction, marking, and testing requirements for these assemblies to ensure safe load restraint.

In the US, regulations establish requirements for the identification, condition, and safe use of tie-down devices, and requires that tie-down assemblies, including synthetic web tie-downs such as ratchet straps, have a manufacturer-assigned working load limit (WLL) that is permanently marked or otherwise identifiable.

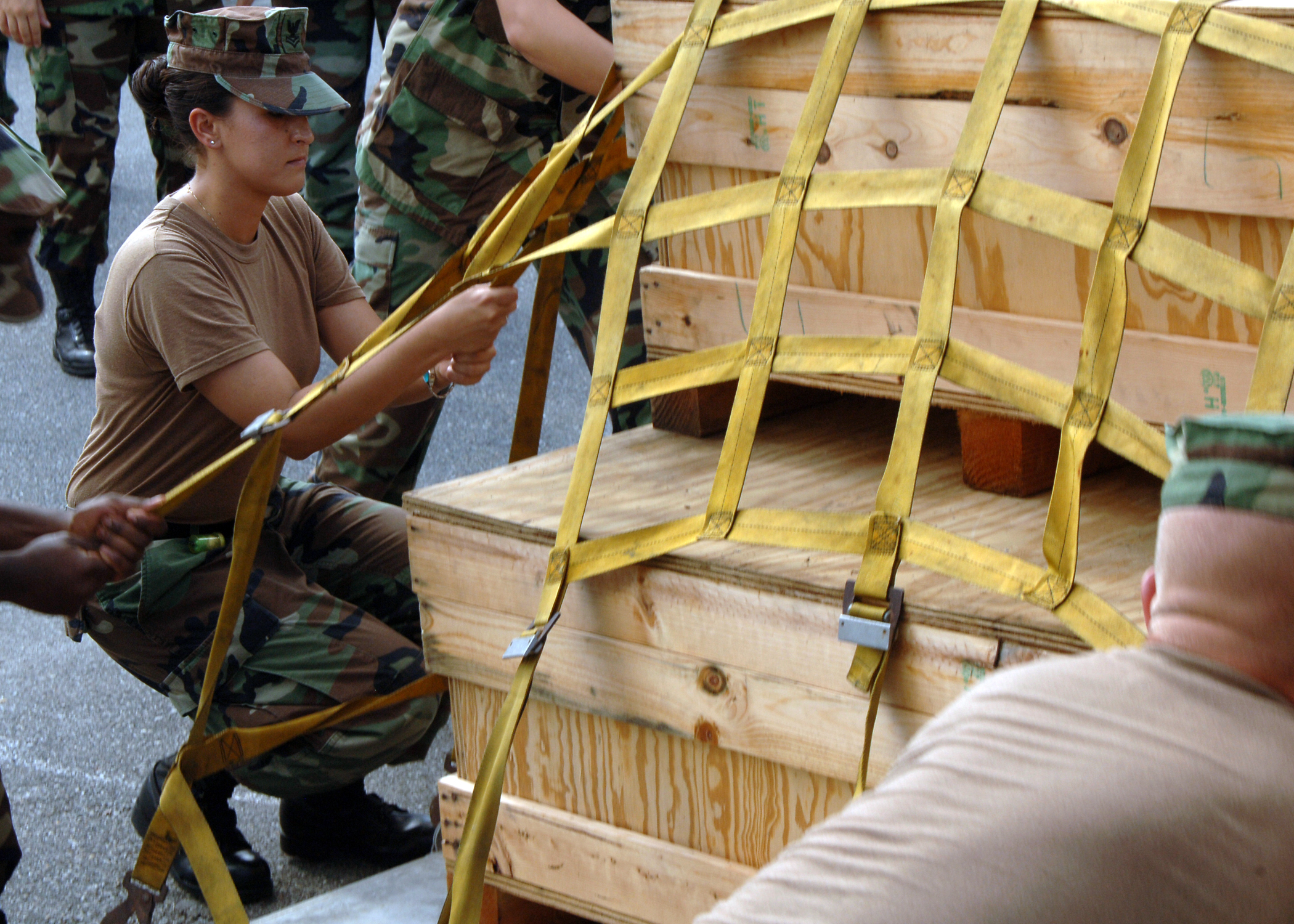
Member of the US Navy secures the strap of a pallet during a training exercise.

Webbing with a linking device is used for the fastening of goods with trucks, trailers, pallets, boxes, and containers. This is also known as ratchet lashing, ratchet straps, ratchet tie downs, tie down straps and lashing with webbing.

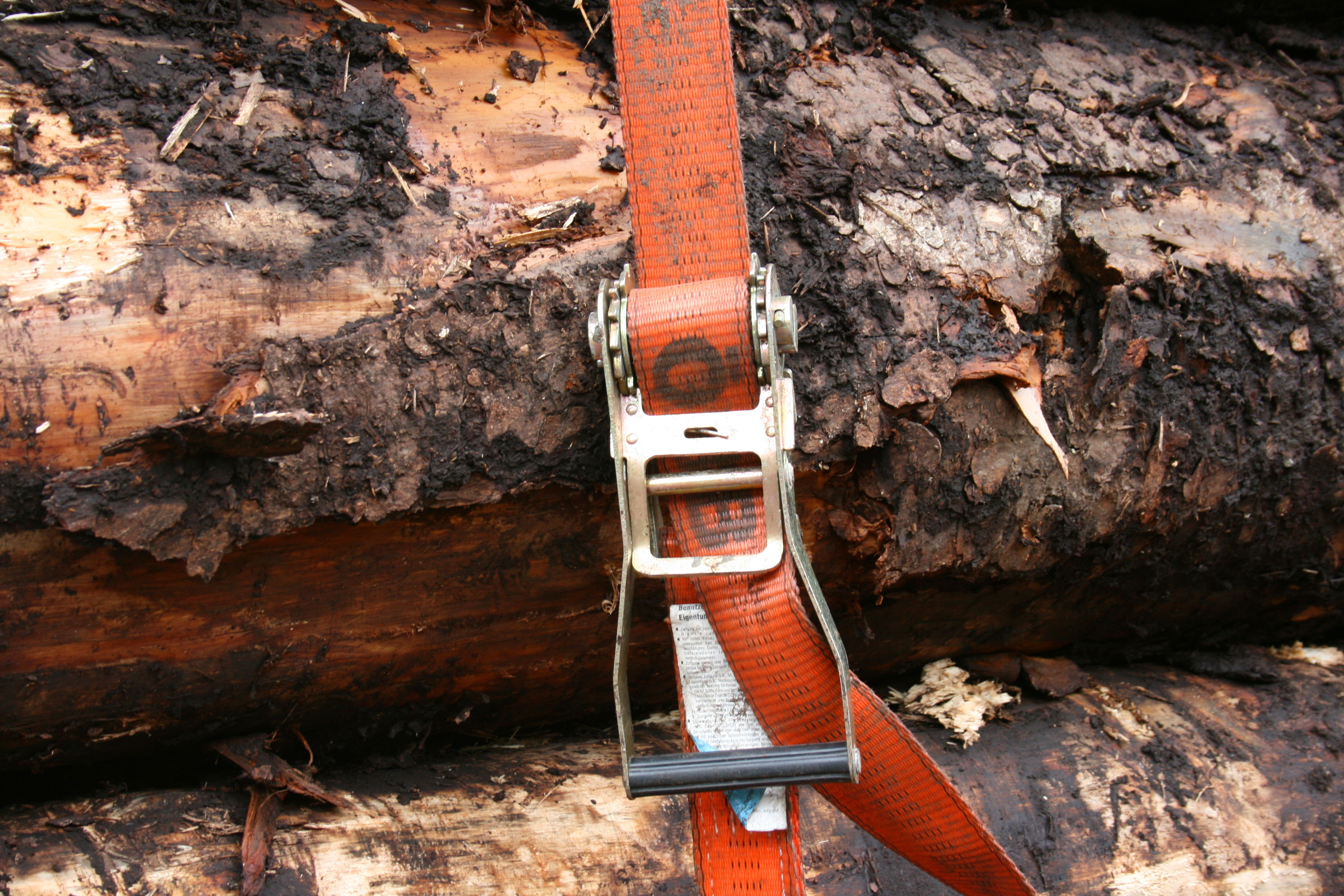
A ratchet tie-down strap

Custom ratchet straps can have hooks such as J hooks, D hooks, E track fittings, and with S hooks being the most popular industry-standard.

== Common types ==
Loop straps
a single piece of webbing that is looped around the item to be protected and the two endpoints are brought together at the tie-down fastener for fastening and providing tension.
Two-piece tie-down strap
a single assembly that is constructed out of two separate pieces of webbing each with their own hardware that is fastened at one end to the area surrounding the equipment to be protected and connected to each other, typically at the fastener.

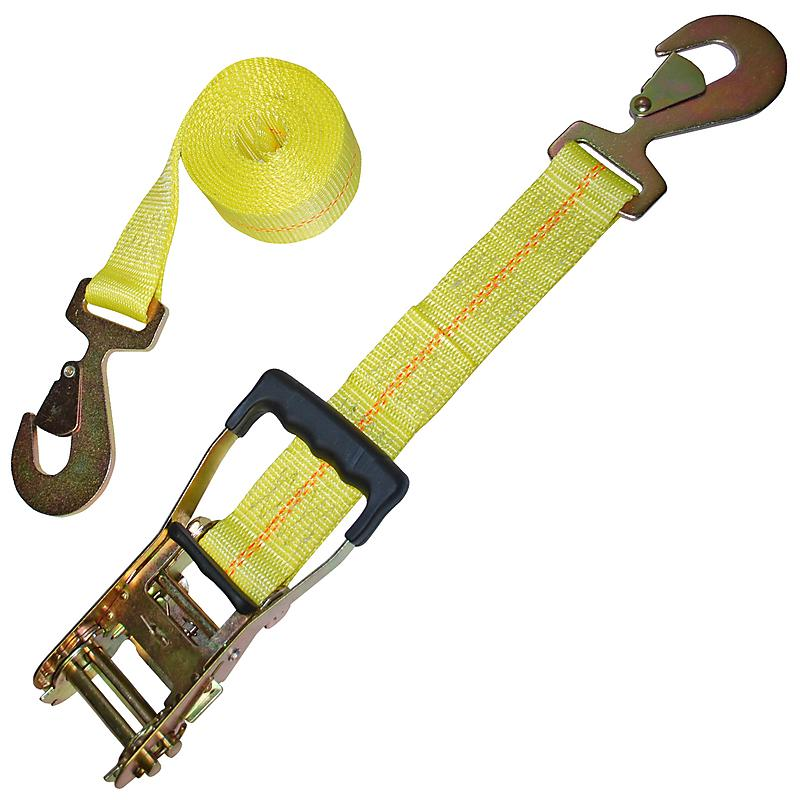
A custom made ratchet strap

== See also ==
- Trucker's hitch
- Load securing
- Strapping
- Webbing
- Chain
