= Ve'ondre Mitchell =

American internet personality

- Born: April 13, 2004 (age 22); Snohomish County, Washington, U.S.
- Education: Glacier Peak High School
- Occupations: Influencer; Recording artist; Activist
- Years active: 2018–present

TikTok information
- Page: veondre
- Followers: 6.8 million
- Last updated: January 26, 2026

Ve'ondre Mitchell (born April 13, 2004) is an American influencer, activist and recording artist. She co-created the 2024 song "It Girl (Fan Remix)" with Aliyah's Interlude, which received over 3.5 million streams on Spotify. Mitchell served as a Youth Ambassador for the Human Rights Campaign in 2021 and was featured in GLAAD's 20 Under 20 List. She was nominated for "TikTok Queer Advocate of the Year" at the 32nd GLAAD Media Awards.

== Early life ==
Ve'ondre Mitchell was born in Snohomish County, Washington. She is of Latin American and African-American heritage. Mitchell came out to her mother as transgender when she was seven years old.

She attended Glacier Peak High School in Snohomish, where she led the school's Black Student Union. Mitchell has said she grew up in a small town that was majority white, and sometimes felt she needed to hide her Black identity.

== Career ==
In 2018, Mitchell appeared in the documentary The Most Dangerous Year which focuses on transgender issues, it received favorable reviews from critics.

Beginning in 2019, Mitchell began cultivating an online following, and had 4.6 million followers on TikTok by November 2021 and 6.6 million followers by June 2023. Mitchell often discussed LGBT issues on her social media.

In 2021, Mitchell was announced to be a Youth Ambassador for the Human Rights Campaign. In the same year, Mitchell was featured on GLAAD's second annual 20 under 20 list and nominated for the "Tiktok Queer Advocate of the Year" award at the 32nd annual GLAAD Media Awards.

In 2022, Mitchell began working on an HIV prevention initiative called Me in You, You in Me.

In 2023, she worked on Chrissy Chlapecka's music video for the single "I'm So Hot."

On January 30, 2024, Aliyah's Interlude and Ve'ondre Mitchell released "It Girl (Fan Remix)". She made her live performance debut of the song at Jewel's Catch One in Los Angeles in June 2024. As of June 2024, "It Girl (Fan Remix)" had amassed over 3.5 million streams on Spotify.

On March 8, 2024, Mitchell released her debut single "Block Em' Anthem." The song used the instrumental for "Hollaback Girl" by Gwen Stefani.

On March 13, 2024, Mitchell appeared in the music video for Dylan Mulvaney's debut single "Days of Girlhood". That same month, she fundraised for the TikTok-a-Thon for Trans Healthcare.

== Discography ==
- "It Girl (Fan Remix)"
- "Block Em' Anthem" (Single)
- "Doll" (Single)
- "Mother" (Single)
- "Secret" (EP)
