= Zaya Perysian =

American TikToker, actress, and activist

- Born: April 30, 2002 (age 23); United States
- Other names: Zaya Perysian
- Occupations: TikToker; Actress; Activist

TikTok information
- Page: zayaperysian
- Followers: 4.9 million
- Last updated: May 11, 2025

Zaya Perysian is an American TikTok personality, actress, and activist. She has been publicly documenting her gender transition through social media since 2019. In 2022, she played the character Asha in the web series Hidden Canyons. In 2025, she identified herself as a plaintiff in a lawsuit against the United States after Executive Order 14168 led to her being issued a passport listing her as male.

== Early life ==
Perysian was born in Lowell, Michigan in 2002. Although she knew she was a trans woman at a young age, she struggled to come to terms with her identity because of unsupportive parents and a lack of role models. She began using TikTok at the age of 19 to document her experiences.

== Career ==
In February 2022, Perysian was featured in 8 episodes of the web series Hidden Canyons. Later that year, in honor of Pride Month, Perysian was featured as one of TikTok's LGBTQ Trailblazers.

In 2023, she was featured in Chrissy Chlapecka's "I'm So Hot."

In March 2024, Perysian participated in the TikTok-a-Thon for Trans Healthcare alongside other LGBTQ content creators. At the same time, she also became an ambassador for Lyft's Women+ Connect feature.

== Lawsuit ==
In January 2025, Perysian began to raise awareness for transgender issues under the Trump Administration after being issued a passport listing her as male, and she later announced the intention to take legal action. On February 7, 2025, the American Civil Liberties Union filed a federal lawsuit on behalf of 7 people, including Perysian. The preliminary injunction of Orr v. Trump, scheduled for March 25, took place in the United States District Court for the District of Massachusetts. On April 18, District Judge Julia Kobick ruled in favor of the plaintiffs, allowing Perysian's federal documents to reflect her current gender identity rather than her sex assigned at birth.

== See also ==
- Hunter Schafer
- Executive Order 14168
