= It Girl (Aliyah's Interlude song) =

2023 single by Aliyah's Interlude

Single by Aliyah's Interlude
- Released: September 30, 2023
- Recorded: 2023
- Genre: House; pop; hip hop
- Length: 2:42
- Label: Interlude
- Songwriter: Aliyah Bah
- Producer: Lxnely Beats

Music Video
- "It Girl" on YouTube

"It Girl" is the debut single by American social media personality Aliyah's Interlude. It was produced by Lxnely Beats and released on September 30, 2023 through Interlude Records. The house-pop song with hip hop influences garnered success on TikTok upon its release and soundtracked more than 990,000 videos on the platform as of November 2023.

A music video for the song was released on November 12, 2023.

== Background, release, and composition ==
Before the release of "It Girl", Aliyah's Interlude had become popular on TikTok for her fashion style, which became known as AliyahCore. She was inspired by listening to Beyoncé's 2022 album Renaissance and her love of house music to "hop on a house beat". After finding one on YouTube, she recorded a rap over it and, after finding the Instagram account of its producer, Lxnely Beats, paid him for exclusive rights to it. Upon the release of "It Girl" on September 30, 2023, it went viral on TikTok, where it soundtracked more than 912,000 videos by November 2023. The pop-house and hip hop song features her rapping about being an "it girl", spelling the phrase out in its chorus, over a "booming" house beat.

== Critical reception ==
For Girls United, Kenyatta Victoria described her energy on the song as "bubbly yet cocky", while Moises Mendez II of Time called the song "bouncy" and compared her flow on it to that of rappers Azealia Banks and Nicki Minaj.

== Commercial performance ==
As of June 2024, the original song has since garnered over 115 million streams on Spotify. As of June 2024, the remix has since garnered over 3.5 million streams on Spotify.

== Music video ==
The official music video for "It Girl" premiered on YouTube on November 12, 2023. The video features her dancing with her friends on the train station MARTA and various other places wearing harajuku and streetwear Y2K inspired fashion. A video of a fan remix with TikTok star Ve'ondre Mitchell premiered a month later and was officially released on January 30, 2024.

== Track listings ==
- Streaming/digital download
1. "It Girl" – 2:42
- Streaming/digital download – sped up
1. "It Girl" (sped up version) – 2:36

== Charts ==
Chart performance for "It Girl"
Chart (2023–2024)	Peak position
Canada (Canadian Hot 100)	77
New Zealand Hot Singles (RMNZ)	20
Poland (Polish Streaming Top 100)	48
UK Singles (OCC)	57
US Bubbling Under Hot 100 (Billboard)	11

== Certifications ==
Certifications for "It Girl"
Region	Certification	Certified units/sales
New Zealand (RMNZ)	Gold	15,000^{‡}
^{‡} Sales+streaming figures based on certification alone.
