= Tie down hardware =

Tie down hardware is used to turn webbing into a tie down strap. There are various categories of tie down strap hardware that allow for the creation of a virtually unlimited number of different types of tie down straps. These pieces of hardware fall into several categories including fasteners, end fittings, and buckles.

== Fasteners ==
There are three major types of fasteners: cam, over-center, and ratchet.

Cam fasteners are a simple type of fastener that use a cam to push down on the webbing that is passed through the cam and prevent the webbing from slipping back through the fastener. The edge of the cam lever that faces the webbing is usually knurled to provide a firmer grip on the webbing. Tension is added by pulling the excess webbing through the fastener until the necessary tension is achieved and then releasing the cam lever to lock the webbing in place.

Over-center fasteners require a slightly more complex threading procedure to start the webbing through the fastener. The tensioning method provided by this fastener makes it easier than the cam fastener to get more tension into the strap and to keep it there. When the fastener is “open” you can feed the excess webbing through the fastener. When all of the slack is removed, the act of “closing” the fastener will add tension to the webbing and hold the tension tightly in place.

Ratchet fasteners are the most complex of the three fasteners to thread, but offer advantages in taking up the slack in the webbing and tensioning the assembly. Once the webbing is threaded through the fastener, the ratcheting mechanism is employed to take up the slack and tension the assembly to the necessary level. The ratcheting mechanism functions similarly to a socket wrench; you open and close the fastener repeatedly to pull the webbing through the fastener. Releasing the tension is a simple matter of depressing the release lever and pulling the webbing back through the fastener.

== Buckles ==
There are several types of buckles found in tie down straps. The two most common are threaded buckles and snap buckles. Threaded buckles work like those found on backpacks and duffel bags for the purpose of adjusting the length of the tie down strap. Snap buckles are also commonly found on backpacks and duffel bags to allow fastening of the strap. These two components are often used in conjunction with the threading buckle providing tension and the snap buckle providing fastening. While threading buckles come in metal varieties for use with tensioning fasteners like over-center and ratchet fasteners, snap buckles are often plastic and are not designed to withstand a great deal of tension.

== See also ==
- Tie down straps
