= Aliyah's Interlude =

American influencer and rapper (born 2003)

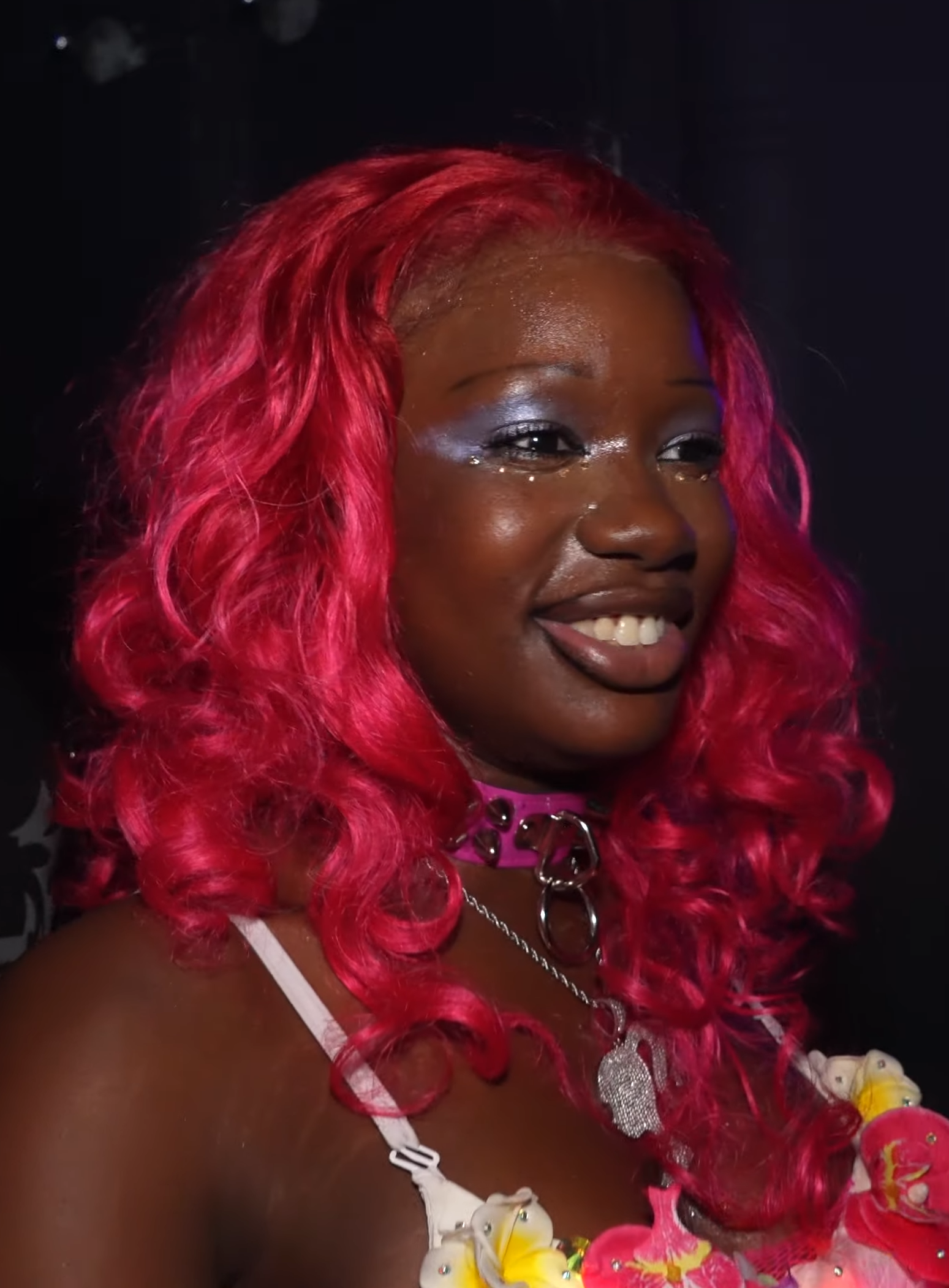
- Bah in 2024
- Born: Aliyah Bah; May 10, 2003 (age 23); Atlanta, Georgia, U.S.
- Occupations: Influencer; rapper; actress
- Years active: 2020–present

TikTok information
- Page: Aliyah's Interlude
- Followers: 2.9 million
- Musical career
- Instruments: Vocals
- Label: RCA
- Last updated: June 13, 2025

Aliyah Bah (born May 10, 2003), known professionally as Aliyah's Interlude, is an American influencer and rapper. After starting her TikTok account in 2020, she became popular on the platform in 2022 for her fashion aesthetic, which became known as AliyahCore online. Her debut single, "It Girl", was released in 2023 and went viral on TikTok.

== Life and career ==
Aliyah Bah was born on May 10, 2003, in Atlanta, Georgia, and raised in Fayetteville. Her parents are Sierra Leonean immigrants who opened a clothing recycling business upon moving to the United States. Her mother, Zainab Kadie Bah, also worked at a hair salon. Bah began thrift shopping at age 15 and has stated that she was bullied for her clothing style in high school.

While a freshman at Georgia State University, Bah began posting GRWM videos on TikTok in 2020 during the COVID-19 pandemic. She became known on the platform for her maximalist, "cute-but-tough" style inspired by Harajuku fashion and Y2K fashion, consisting primarily of pink items, Hello Kitty memorabilia, belts, fur, boots, garters, bikini tops, leg warmers, earmuffs, miniskirts, necklaces, and fishnets, which she dubbed "AliyahCore" in late 2022. Her tweet featuring a picture of her wearing a bikini and Moon Boots together also went viral in November 2022. By November 2023, the hashtag #Aliyahcore had over 400 million views on TikTok.

As a model, Bah made her runway debut at Mowalola's Autumn/Winter 2023 show during London Fashion Week in February 2023 and later walked the runway at Dominnico's Autumn/Winter 2023 show in May 2023 for Barcelona Fashion Week. In September 2023, she appeared in the music video for Doja Cat's song "Agora Hills". Also that month, she self-released her debut single, "It Girl". The house-pop song quickly went viral on TikTok, where it soundtracked more than 912,000 videos by November 2023. Her follow-up singles, "Fashion Icon" and "Love Me", were released in February and June 2024, respectively. She was also included on TikTok's Black Visionary Voices list for 2024. She made her acting debut playing a high schooler in FX's comedy television series English Teacher, which premiered in September 2024. Also that month, she released her single "Moodboard".

She released her debut extended play, Kuntology 101, on January 16, 2026.

In 2026, Bah collaborated with the K-pop group Le Sserafim on their second full album Pureflow Pt. 1, appearing on the track "Saki", for which she is also credited as a writer.

== Personal life ==
Bah has referred to Grace Jones, Vivienne Westwood, Zendaya, and Avril Lavigne as her biggest style icons. She has also named Issa Rae and Keke Palmer as influences. As of 2023, she lives in New York City. She is pansexual.

== Discography ==
=== Extended plays ===
Title	Details
Kuntology 101	Released on: January 16, 2026; Label: RCA; Format: Digital download, streaming

=== Singles ===
==== As lead artist ====
List of singles, with selected chart positions
Title	Year	Peak chart positions						Album
Title	Year	US Bub.	CAN	NZ Hot	POL Stream.	UKR Air.	UK	Album
"It Girl"	2023	11	77	20	48	—	57	Non-album singles
"Fashion Icon" (solo or featuring Ayesha Erotica)	2024	—	—	—	—	—	—	Non-album singles
"Love Me"	2024	—	—	—	—	—	—	Non-album singles
"Moodboard"	2024	—	—	—	—	—	—	Non-album singles
"Haute Couture" (with Rhea Raj)	2025	—	—	—	—	—	—	Commotion
"WTF My Drink @?"	2025	—	—	—	—	—	—	Non-album singles
"Brand New"	2025	—	—	—	—	67	—	Non-album singles
"Kryptonite"	2025	—	—	—	—	—	—	Kuntology 101
"Miniskirt"	2025	—	—	—	—	—	—	Kuntology 101
"—" denotes a recording that did not chart or was not released.

==== As featured artist ====
List of singles, with selected chart positions
Title	Year	Album
"Babydoll" (Grace VanderWaal featuring Aliyah's Interlude)	2025	Childstar
"Fly Gurl" (Kitty Ca$h featuring Aliyah's Interlude & OGMarlynMonROLLUP)	2025	Non-album singles
"Booboo2" (Yaeji with Underscores and Aliyah's Interlude)	2025	Non-album singles
"Cunt Mix" (Maleigh Zan with Infinite Coles, Brooke Candy, and Aliyah's Interlude)	2025	Non-album singles

=== Guest appearances ===
List of non-single guest appearances, showing year released and album name
Title	Other artist(s)	Year	Album
"Angels in Tibet" (Aliyah's Interlude remix)	Amaarae	2024	Angels in Tibet (Remix Pack)
"Saki"	Le Sserafim	2026	Pureflow Pt. 1
