= V Spehar =

American TikTokker

- Spehar in 2026
- Born: 1982 (age 43–44)
- Years active: 2021–present
- Known for: Political activism, news
- Spouse: Natalie Spehar

Instagram information
- Page: V Spehar
- Genre: Journalism
- Followers: 1 million

TikTok information
- Page: UnderTheDeskNews
- Years active: 2020–present
- Genre: Journalism
- Followers: 3.7 million

YouTube information
- Channel: Under The Desk News
- Years active: 2022–present
- Subscribers: 211 thousand
- Views: 15 million
- Last updated: October 13, 2025

Vitus Spehar, better known as V Spehar, is an American journalist and podcast host best known for their TikTok account, UnderTheDeskNews.

== Career ==
A graduate of Wagner College on Staten Island, before entering journalism, Spehar worked in the culinary and hospitality industries in New York City, Tampa, Florida, and Washington DC. This included working at catering companies, the James Beard Foundation and Hungry Harvest, an organization which addresses food insecurity. Their first TikTok videos focused on preparing and cooking food during the early months of the COVID-19 pandemic.

During the January 6 Insurrection in 2021, Spehar created a short video addressed to then-Vice President Mike Pence while lying under a desk. The video took off, and Spehar continued to make videos focusing on explaining current events simply.

After UnderTheDeskNews gained popularity, Spehar was hired to oversee the Los Angeles Times' TikTok account for six months. They also signed with Lemonada Media to produce V Interesting, a weekly podcast which expanded Spehar's news coverage, which launched in 2022.

Spehar attended VidCon in June 2022. The following month, they received a New York Commendation Award for their journalistic efforts. In September 2022 Spehar appeared on the Today Show. By October 2022, Spehar's TikTok had 2.7 million followers. That same month, Spehar was one of several TikTok influencers to be invited to attend briefings at the White House on the Inflation Reduction Act and on encouraging voter turnout for the 2022 Midterm Elections. Barack Obama worked with the invitees to create videos encouraging voter turnout. In November 2022 Spehar covered the Macy's Thanksgiving Day Parade on their and NBC's TikTok accounts. In March 2023 Spehar attended the congressional hearing on the RESTRICT Act, during which they sat directly behind Shou Zi Chew, the CEO of TikTok. Spehar criticized the proposed act both on their TikTok account and in-person at a press conference hosted by Rep. Jamaal Bowman the day before the hearing.

In late March 2023, Spehar appeared as a guest of Mercury Stardust's 30-hour livestream, which in total raised more than $2 million for transgender healthcare.

== Awards and recognition ==
- 2023 Webby Special Achievement Award
- 2025 Shorty Awards News Creator of the Year
- 2025 TIME100 Creators List

== Personal life ==
Spehar, who is originally from Shelton, Connecticut, has lived in Rochester, New York since 2020. Spehar is a nonbinary lesbian, uses they/them pronouns, and has dyslexia.
