= Strapping =

Fastening a strap around item or bundle

Strapping, also known as bundling and banding, is the process of applying a strap to an item to combine, stabilize, hold, reinforce, or fasten it. A strap may also be referred to as strapping. Strapping is most commonly used in the packaging industry.

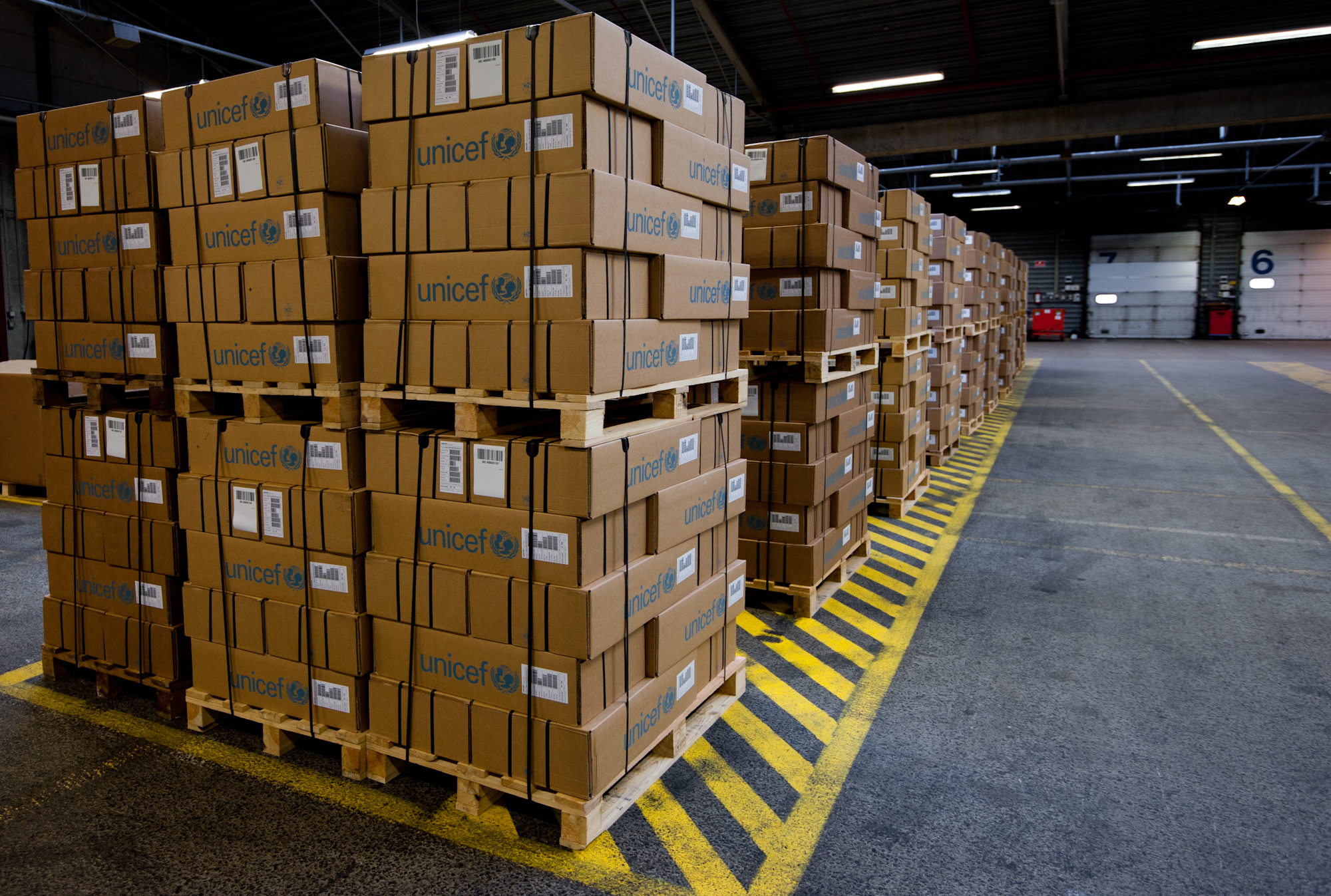
Telescope corrugated boxes closed with strapping. Boxes are attached to pallet with bands of strapping, with edge protectors at the top of the load.

== Types of strap ==
Strap is a flat, flexible material, most commonly made from steel or various types of plastic.

=== Steel ===
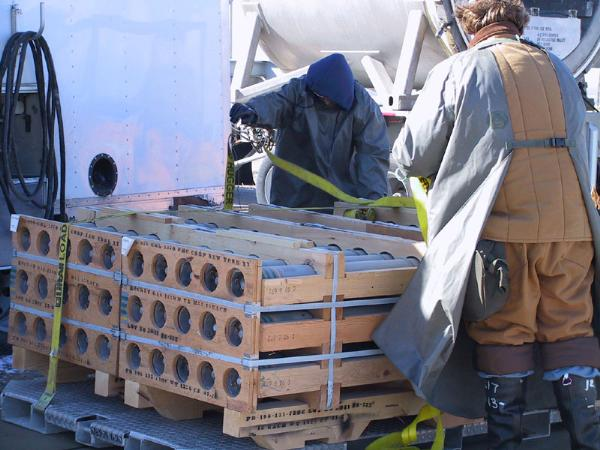
Strapping used on a shipment of chemical weapons slated for destruction

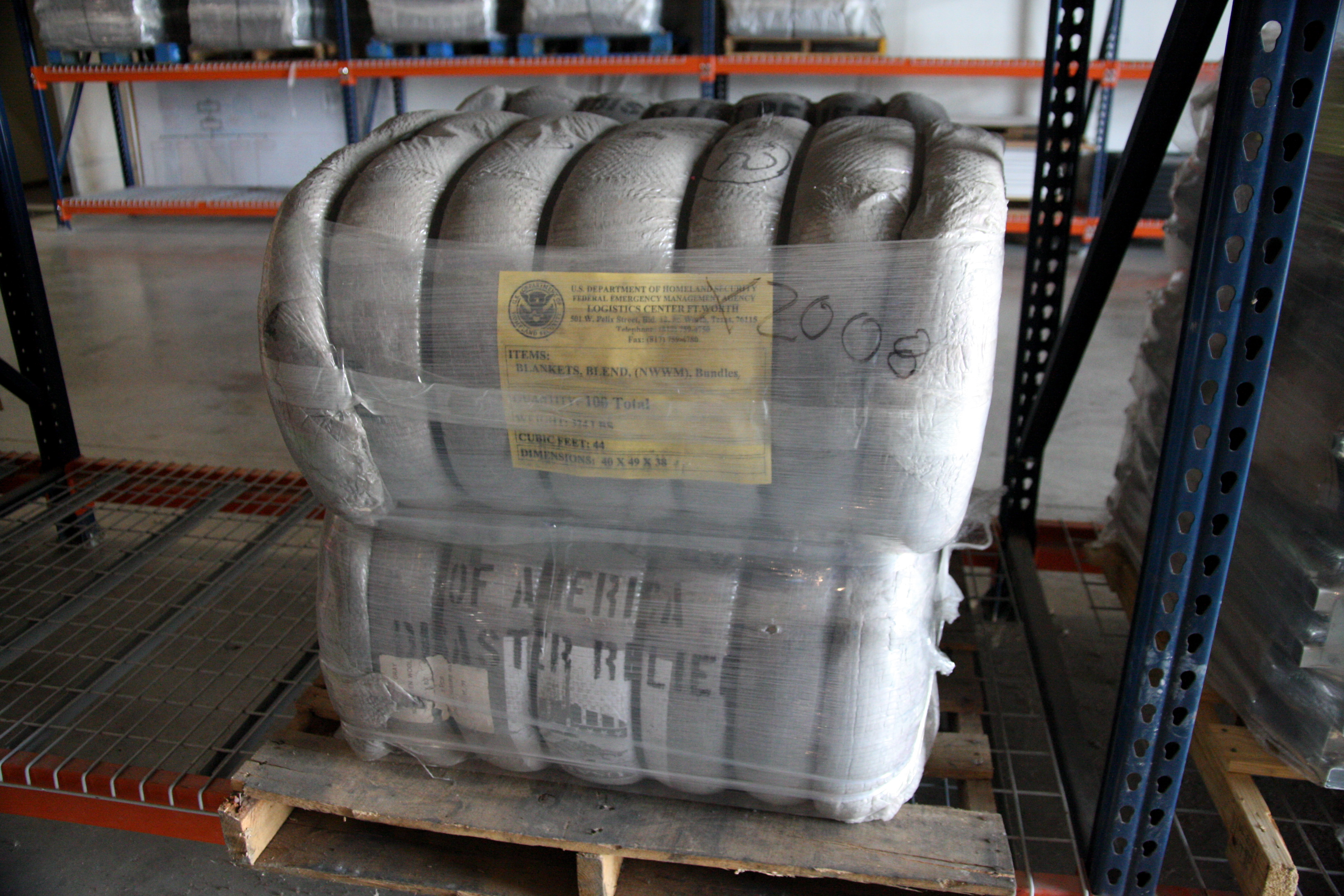
Soft goods strapped in a bale or bundle

Steel is the oldest and highest tensile strength strapping. It is available in a variety of widths and thicknesses as well as variations in the grade of steel. Steel is used for heavy duty holding where high strength and minimal stretch are desired. Surface finishes for steel strap include: paint, paint and wax, bluing, or zinc and wax. The wax is used to better transmit the tension around the bundle and for use with certain types of tensioners. Common applications include steel coils, bundles of metal, baling wire, bricks and other pavers, and roll end-binding.

Steel strapping is sold by weight rather than length due to the natural expansion and contraction of steel in the manufacturing process. A 3/4 x .020 steel strapping coil yields approximately 19.6 feet per pound.

=== Polypropylene ===
Polypropylene strap (oriented or tensilized) is an economical material designed for light to medium duty unitizing, palletizing, and bundling. It is available in various widths, thicknesses, and polymer variations (e.g., copolymers). Most polypropylene is embossed, and some is also printed. This product offers higher elongation at break, but tends to have irrecoverable dead stretch with constant stress. What is not generally known to end users is that polypropylene strapping will lose about 50% of the applied tension within one hour, and that this tension loss is accelerated with increases in ambient temperature. Consequently, although it is suitable for packs due to a degree of stored energy that will take up any relaxation that occurs in the strap, unacceptable strap slackness may occur after time if used on solid product, such as brick or concrete. Furthermore, polypropylene strapping is susceptible to UV degradation and can degrade quickly if left exposed to the elements. UV degradation can be mitigated by specifying the use of black strap or a UV inhibitor.

Polypropylene strapping can be printed. For the highest quality and precision, printing occurs during production (and pre-embossing). Printing can also occur post-production over the embossing, at the cost of reduced quality. Both options offer security and marketing advantages to the strapped product.

=== Polyester ===
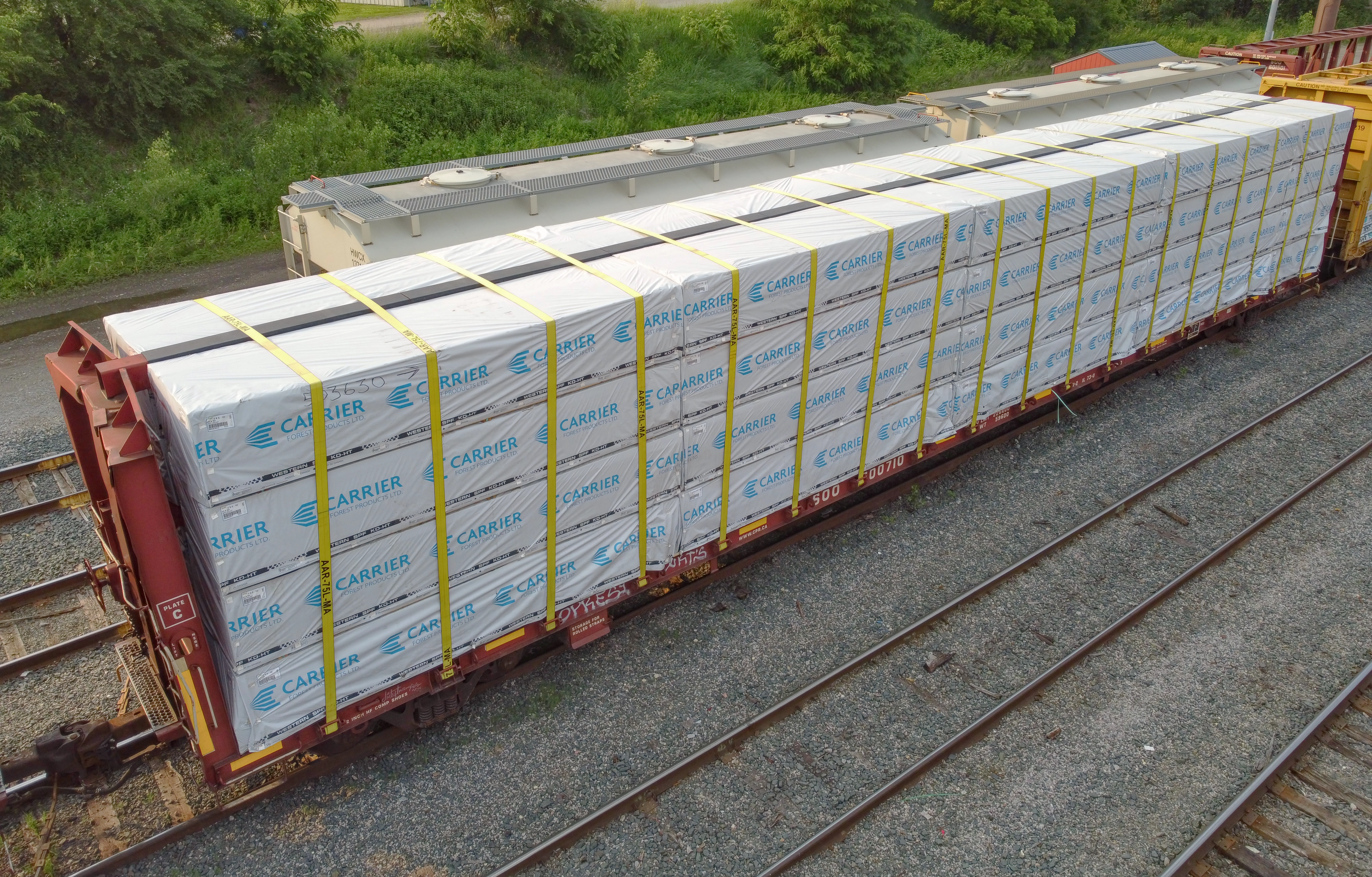
Centerbeam flatcar with polyester tie-down rolled straps

Oriented or tensilized polyester and nylon are the strongest plastic strapping materials and are used as a viable alternative to steel strapping in some industries. Polyester provides retained tension on rigid loads and its recovery properties help a load absorb impact without strap breakage.

There are specialized types available for specific applications. For instance, in cold climates a strap bonded in hot melt glue is used because it is weather-proof.

=== Nylon ===
Nylon strap has the greatest specific strength of the three plastics, but it is rarely used due to its high price. Nylon strap used to be very popular, but over time polyester strap has almost completely replaced nylon. Nylon strap is still used in cold room applications, however, because it does not creep as much as the other types of plastic.

=== Corded and woven ===
Corded and woven strapping are available in several constructions, primarily involving polyester and rayon. Some types are reusable. Because this system uses a buckle for a joint, corded and woven strapping can have a larger system strength than steel banding. Corded polyester strapping also has a higher elongation than other strapping systems, which gives it an ideal memory for sea and rail shipments. Because corded and woven polyester straps are light and soft, they are also a safer alternative to steel banding.

=== Paper ===
Paper strap is used to strap paper products between industrial processes. This allows the bundle to be introduced into the process without cutting the straps, which can lead to the product falling apart prematurely.

=== Composite ===
Composite strapping has polyester filaments embedded longitudinally down the length of the strap that provides the tensile strength. These polyester yarn fibers are embedded within a polypropylene coating. The polypropylene provides foam to the strap, but also improves the non-slip characteristic when combined with the wire buckle. In the load securing industry, composite is often referred to as "synthetic steel". It is very abrasion-resistant and has the highest joint efficiency when used with a buckle. Both advantages are not affected by climate.

== Uses of strapping ==
Examples include:

- Bundling items together for handling and shipment: newspapers, pipe, lumber, concrete block, etc.
- Attaching items to pallets, skids, and crates
- Attaching items to flatcars, flatbed semi-trailers,
- Securing a unit load of bricks, packaged glass, metal parts, etc.
- Closing corrugated boxes and shipping containers
- Securing coils of steel or paper
- Holding bales of agricultural products or textiles
- Load securing items within intermodal containers, boxcars, and semi-trailers

Strapping is most often used in complete horizontal or vertical bands. Edge protectors are used to help distribute the load at corners and reduce damage done to the load by the tensioned strap. Strapping can also be used in loops attached to holding locations on rail cars, skids, etc.

== Joining methods ==
After the strap is tensioned, the strap is often sealed to itself. Steel strap is sealed with a seal and notch joint, a seal and crimp, seal-less joint, or via welding. Seals come in various shapes depending on the application; some can be put on after the strap is tensioned, while others must be installed before tensioning. To create the seal, the seal and strap are notched on both sides; if one set of notches are created then it is called a single notch joint, if two sets of notches are created then it is called a double notch joint. Crimp joints also use a seal, but crimp undulations are used instead of formed notches. These crimps form great frictional forces which keep the joint from seeping. Seal-less joints are created by forming interlocking keys into the middle of the strap.

Plastic strap is most commonly joined by melting the straps together by adding heat to the joint. For lighter gauge strap, usually 16 mm (0.63 in) and narrower, heat is introduced with a hot knife system. First, the hot knife moves in between the straps. Then a platen comes up and compresses the straps and hot knife against an anvil on the order of tens of milliseconds. The platen then drops and the hot knife is removed. After the hot knife is completely clear of the straps the platen comes back up and compresses the joint so that the melted portions of the strap mix and harden.

For thicker plastic strap, usually 0.73 mm (0.029 in) and thicker, friction is used to create heat within the joint. The process starts with the strap compressed between the platen and the anvil. There is a vibrator built into either the platen or the anvil, which has teeth; there are also teeth on the opposite component, which does not move. The vibrator is quickly vibrated, which creates enough heat to melt the interface between the two strap, because of friction. To complete the weld the vibrator is stopped and the pressure held until the joint has solidified. Polypropylene and Polyester strapping can also be sealed in a similar manner with the heat being produced by sound in the form of Ultrasonic waves passing through the materials and exiting the molecular structure. They are then compressed as in a heat seal. In ultrasonic welding of plastics, high frequency (15 kHz to 40 kHz ) low amplitude vibration is used to create heat by way of friction between the materials to be joined. The interface of the two parts is specially designed to concentrate the energy for the maximum weld strength.

It may also be joined manually by crimping a seal or via a buckle.

The joint is the weakest part of the system, therefore the type of joining method used is very important if strength is an issue. The strength of a joint is defined as the force required to break the strap in uniaxial tension. This is then compared to the uniaxial strength of the strap and recorded as the percent difference (e.g., a sample of steel strap may have a 5,000 lb (2,300 kg) break strength and the seal may fail at 3,000 lb (1,400 kg), so the seal is said to have a 60% strength). Hot knife welds have a minimum break strength of 55%. Friction welds have a minimum break strength of 65%. Well set up strapping machines or friction weld tools will aim for around 80% of break strength. Metal clips/seals are surprisingly low with about 100 – 120 kg slip resistance.

For pallets strapping based on norm ASTM D3953 Standard Specification, the number of the strapping procedure is around 10 times for a minimal.

== Equipment ==
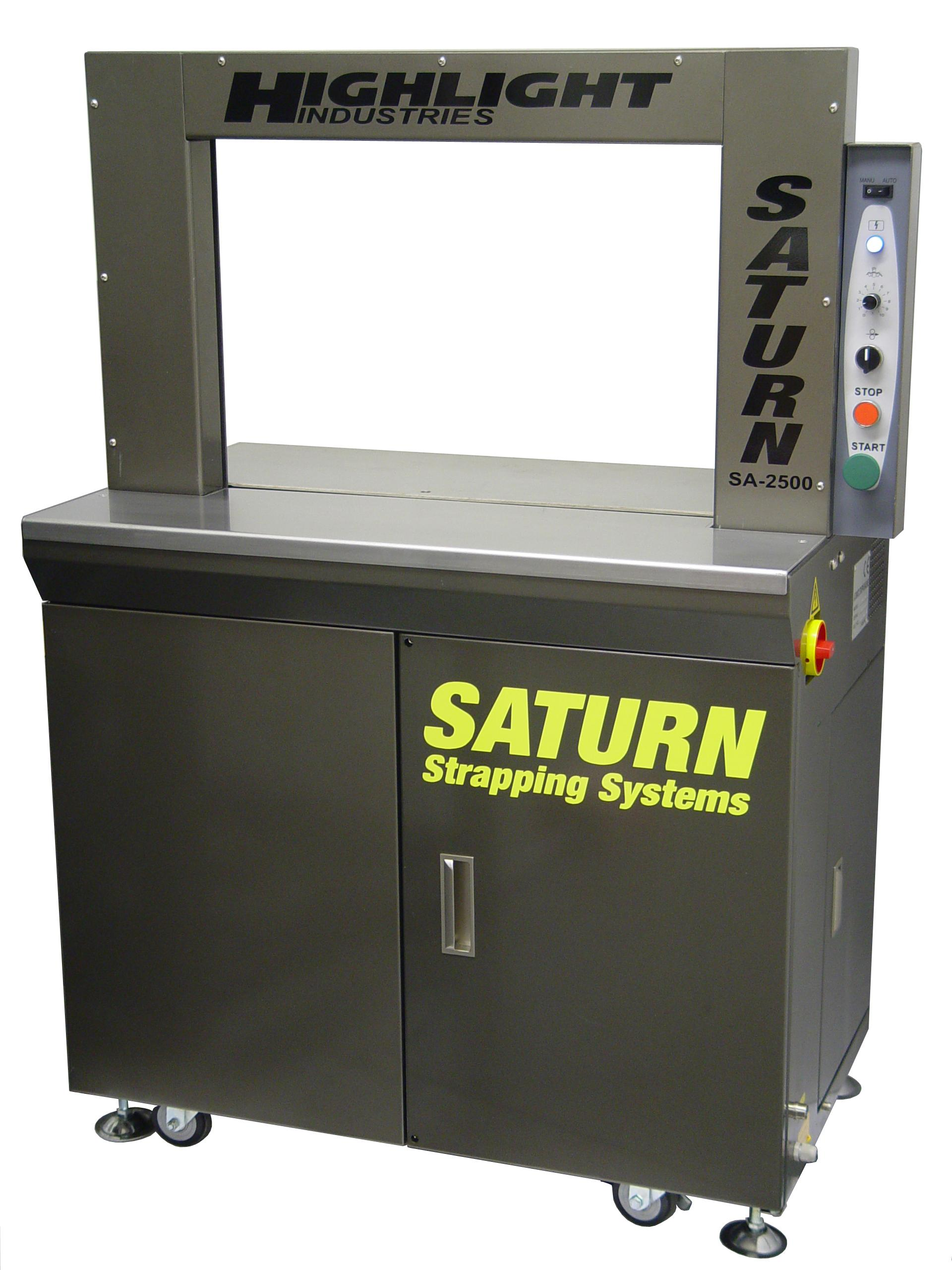
A tabletop arch strapper.

There are two major types of equipment available for strapping: hand tools, and strapping machines or banding machines. A dispenser is used with both types of equipment to dispense the strap. Some strapping machines have the dispenser built-in; others (typically those on large arch machines) have a separately powered dispenser, which can automatically load or thread new coils. Non-powered separated dispensers have a pulley which releases and activates a brake to stop the inertia of the coil and keep the strap from over-running onto the floor. Typically, dispensers used on large arch strapping machines have multiple pulleys to act as a way to store strap in a way that can be quickly dispensed. Smaller arch machines, such as tabletop machines, will feed strap into a pool box/accumulator instead. In both cases this is required; otherwise, the strapping machine will draw the strap faster than the dispenser can pay off.

=== Hand tools ===
There are two types of hand tools: manual, and automatic.

Both manual and automatic tools are available as combination tools, which perform the tensioning, sealing and cutting, or as separate tensioners, sealers, and cutters. Manual and automatic hand sealers for steel can use either a seal or a seal-less joint.

Manual tensioners and crimping systems are available for low-volume applications. Manual sealers for plastic strap always use a seal and a compression (serrated seals) or crimp joint (smooth-faced seals).

Automatic hand tools are used for higher-volume applications. Automatic tools can be powered by an electric battery, or by compressed air. Automatic hand tools for plastic strap use a friction weld.

=== Strapping machines ===
Strapping machines, also known as bundlers or banders, are used for higher-volume applications or special applications. They are available in horizontal and vertical orientations (with the vertical orientation being far more common). They are also available in bottom seal, side seal, and top seal orientations, which define where the joint is located on the bundle.

Strapping machines are available in semi-automatic and automatic varieties. The automatic machines can additionally be used inline with conveyor systems. A photocell is used to detect when the bundle is in the correct location, stop the conveyors, and activate the strapping machine. Most, however, will be found in standalone applications. Semi-automatic and fully automatic strapping machines substantially improve efficiency in a warehouse and also the overall presentation of a packaged product. The saved labor can often easily cover the relatively low cost of the strapping machine.

Both semi- and fully-automatic strapping machines can easily be included in a packing production line where packing tables and strapping machines are positioned at workable heights.

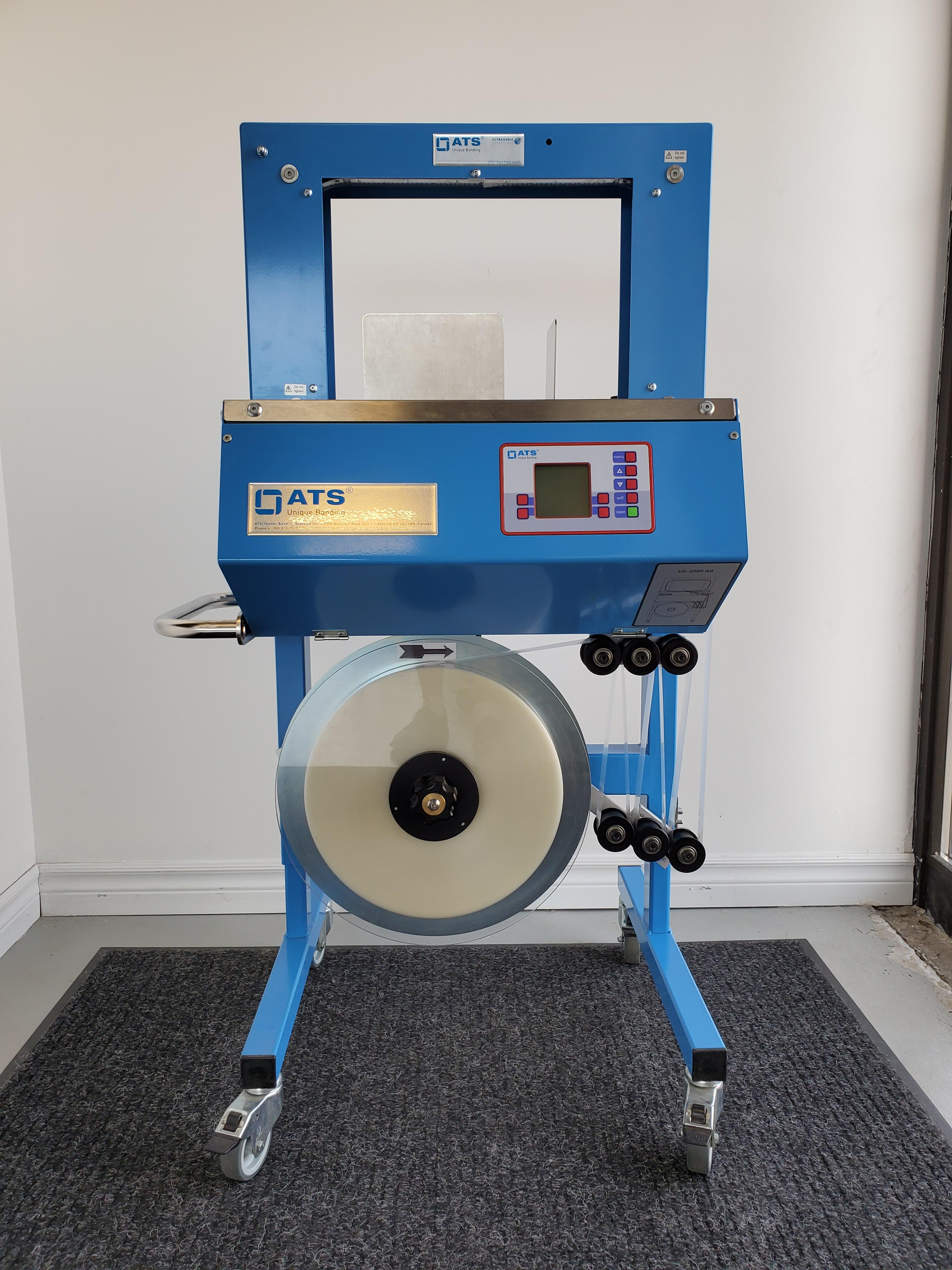
Banding Machine

Banding machines like strapping machines allow the unitization and securing of products with a variety of different shapes and sizes.

Banding machines, however, are less damaging to the product being strapped, since the larger widths of bands available (20mm - 100mm) allow greater surface area that minimizes the harm on sensitive products. Banding machines can also run on paper straps for a more eco-friendly alternative to plastic strapping.

Operation is by photo-sensor, foot pedal, or a PLC, allowing these machines to be integrated into production lines or for standalone operation.

Automatic strapping machines allow hands-free securing of parcels with automatically tensioned, sealed, and cut polypropylene strapping.

These machines are operated either by foot pedal or parcel sensor, which makes them ideal for volume throughput.

Semi-automatic strapping machines will allow one operator to automatically tension, seal, and cut polypropylene strapping to give neat and secure fastening on any size box.

Adjustable strap tensioning to suit each package prevents strap damage to softer boxes.

== See also ==
- Cable tie
- Packaging and labeling

== Standards ==
- ASTM D3953 Standard Specification for Strapping, Flat Steel and Seals
- ASTM D3950 Standard Specification for Strapping, Nonmetallic (and Joining Methods)
- ASTM D4675 Standard Guide for Selection and Use of Flat Strapping Materials
- BS EN13891:2003 Tensional Strapping – Guide to selection and use of tensional strapping
- BS EN13394:2001 Packaging Specification for non-metallic strapping
