= Load securing =

Securing of cargo for transportation

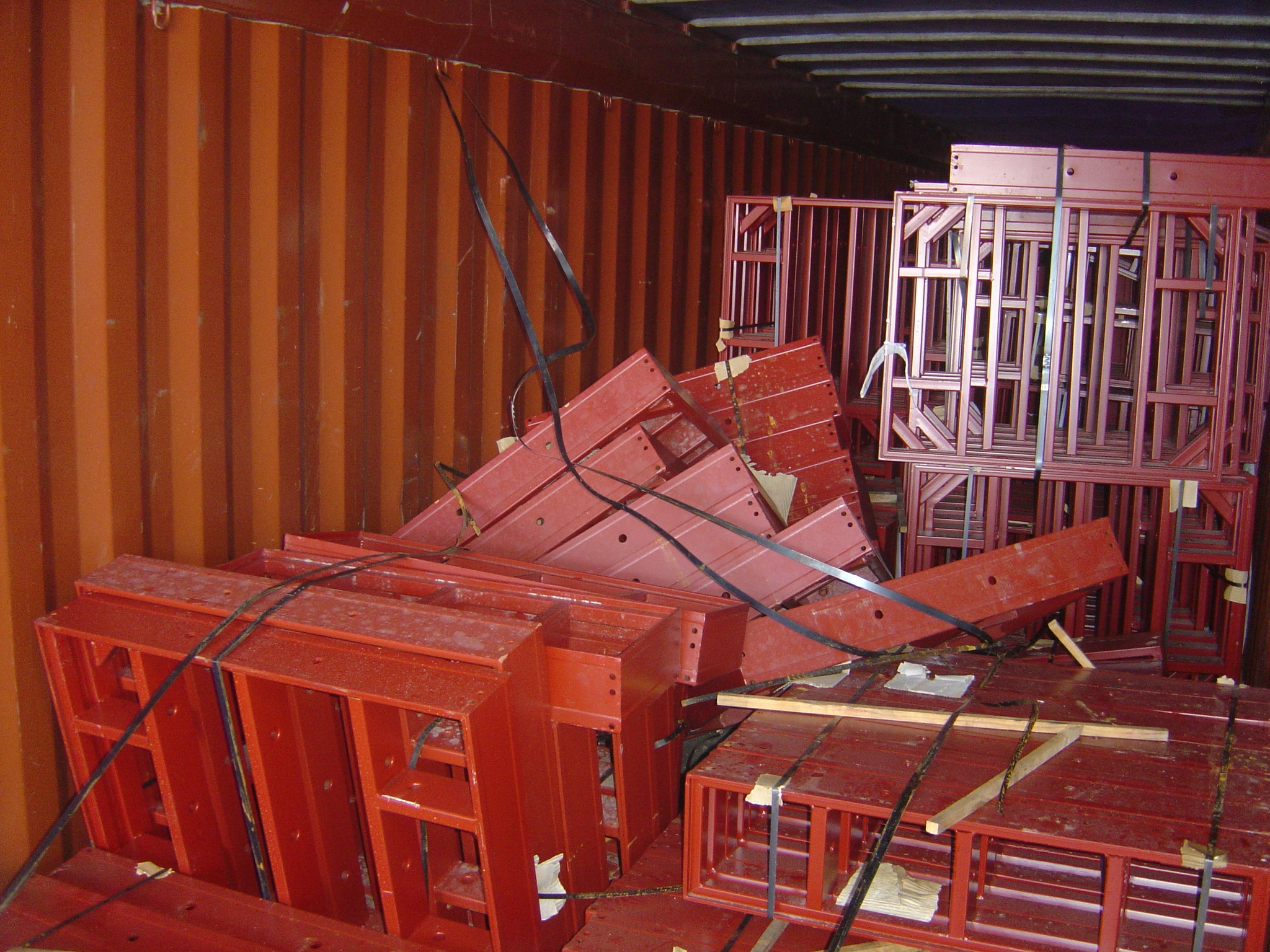
Cargo damage because of improperly secured cargo

Load securing, also known as cargo securing, is the securing of cargo for transportation. According to the European Commission Transportation Department "it has been estimated that up to 25% of accidents involving trucks can be attributable to inadequate cargo securing". Cargo that is improperly secured can cause severe accidents and lead to the loss of cargo, lives, and vehicles, or cause environmental hazards.

== Background ==
Because of globalization, the subsequent flow of goods that are transported over greater distances, containerization and new regulatory measures has led to a greater demand for efficient, cost effective and environmentally friendly cargo restraint products.

Many types of cargo such as corrugated fiberboard boxes are often formed into a unit load. This often consists of items on a pallet unitized by stretch wrap, shrink wrap, pressure-sensitive tape, or strapping. Larger shipping containers such as crates are often on skids and are ready for loading. These unit loads are placed in intermodal containers, trucks, or railroad cars for shipment. Some large bundled items or large machinery are placed directly into or onto the transport vehicle for shipment.

Load securing functions to hold the unit pallet loads, crates, or other items immobile and secure. An unsecured load can shift in transit and create dangerous dynamics, damaging the cargo and the structure of the vehicle or intermodal container.

== Methods ==
There are many different ways and materials available to stabilize and secure cargo in vehicles and intermodal containers. Often combinations of load securing methods are use. For example a load can be blocked against the headboard of the truck and have webbing restraints tying it down.

=== Blocking and bracing ===
Blocking and bracing is a load securement method using lumber and metal bars to reduce or inhibit front to rear shifting of freight/cargo. Plastic forms are also used.

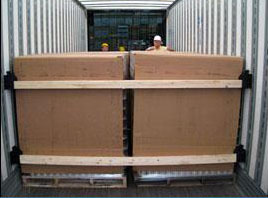
Blocking and Bracing with timber

=== Fasteners ===
Depending on the type of load and the particular vehicle, large bolts and nails may be used. These may be on the load itself or on wood blocks used to brace the load. Fasteners rely on the constructional strength of the Cargo Transport Unit (CTU).

=== Dunnage ===
Dunnage for securing cargo includes scrap wood to fill voids in cargo, wooden boards forming "cribs", blocking and bracing, and modern mechanical, spring-loaded post-and-socket systems, Dunnage segregates cargo in the hold and prevents shifting of the cargo in response to ship or vehicle motions. Dunnage stresses the constructional strength of the Cargo Transport Unit (CTU).

=== Strapping ===
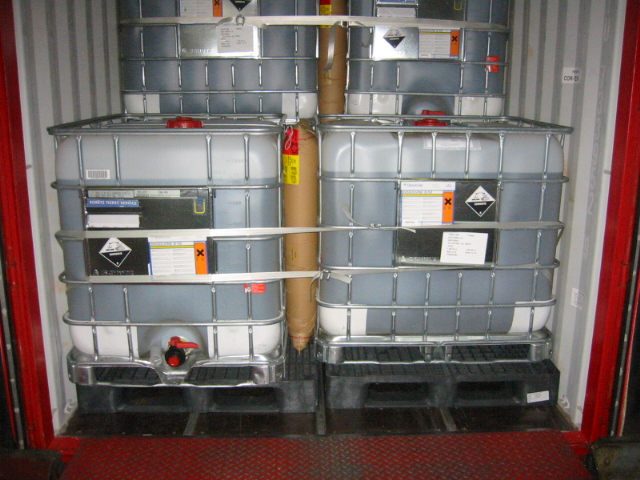
Polyester strapping and dunnage bag application

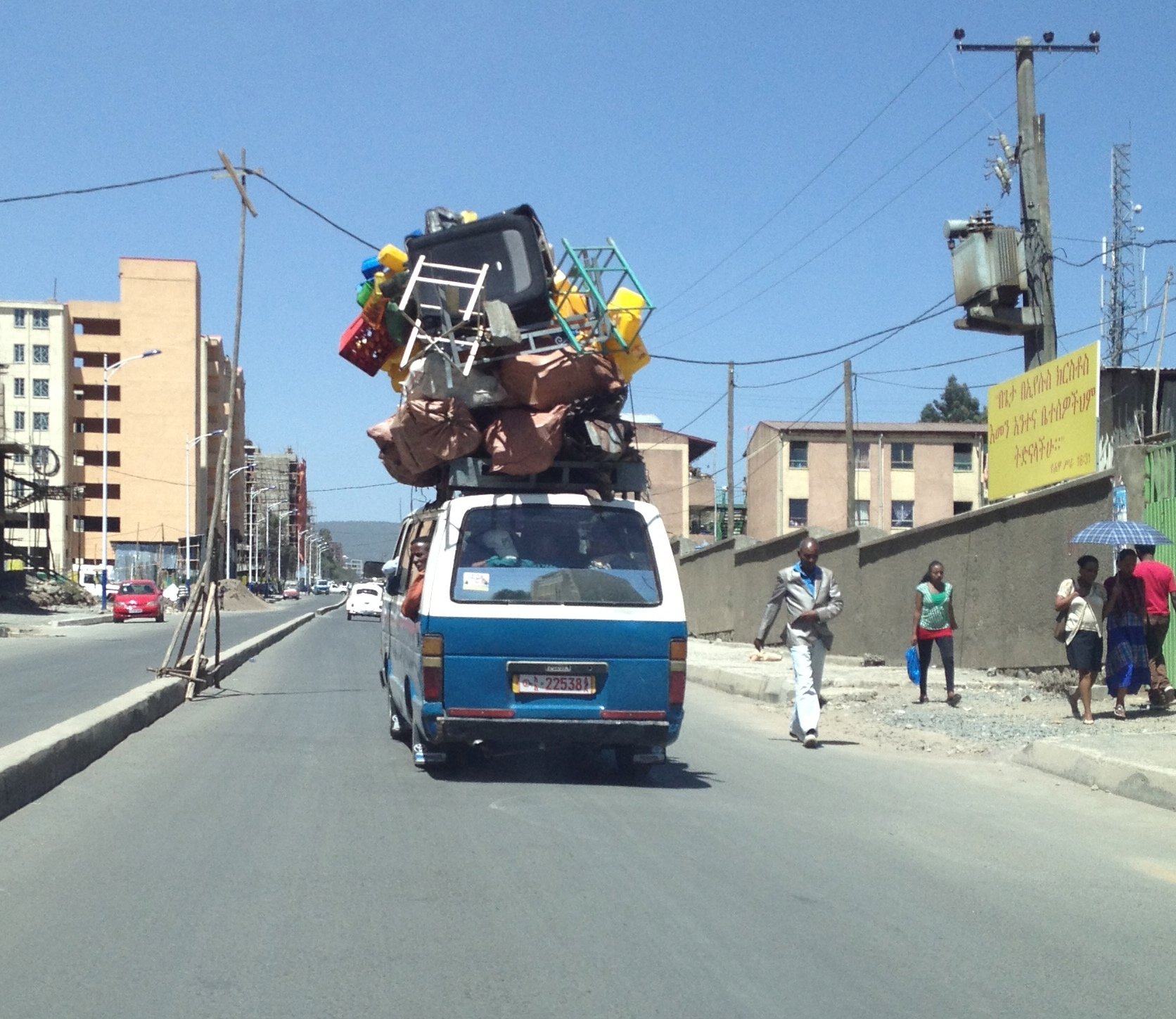
Car in Addis Ababa tying cargo down with straps.

Strapping is used to create a transportable unit. Types of strapping include steel, polyester, polypropylene, nylon, paper, and composites. The type of strap used depends on the requirements, for example, strength, elasticity, ability to withstand various environments, ease of use, safety, and cost. Strapping methods and limits should be according to valid standard, for example EN12195.

All types of tensioned strapping, particularly steel, need to be handled carefully because of potential injury.

=== Lashing ===
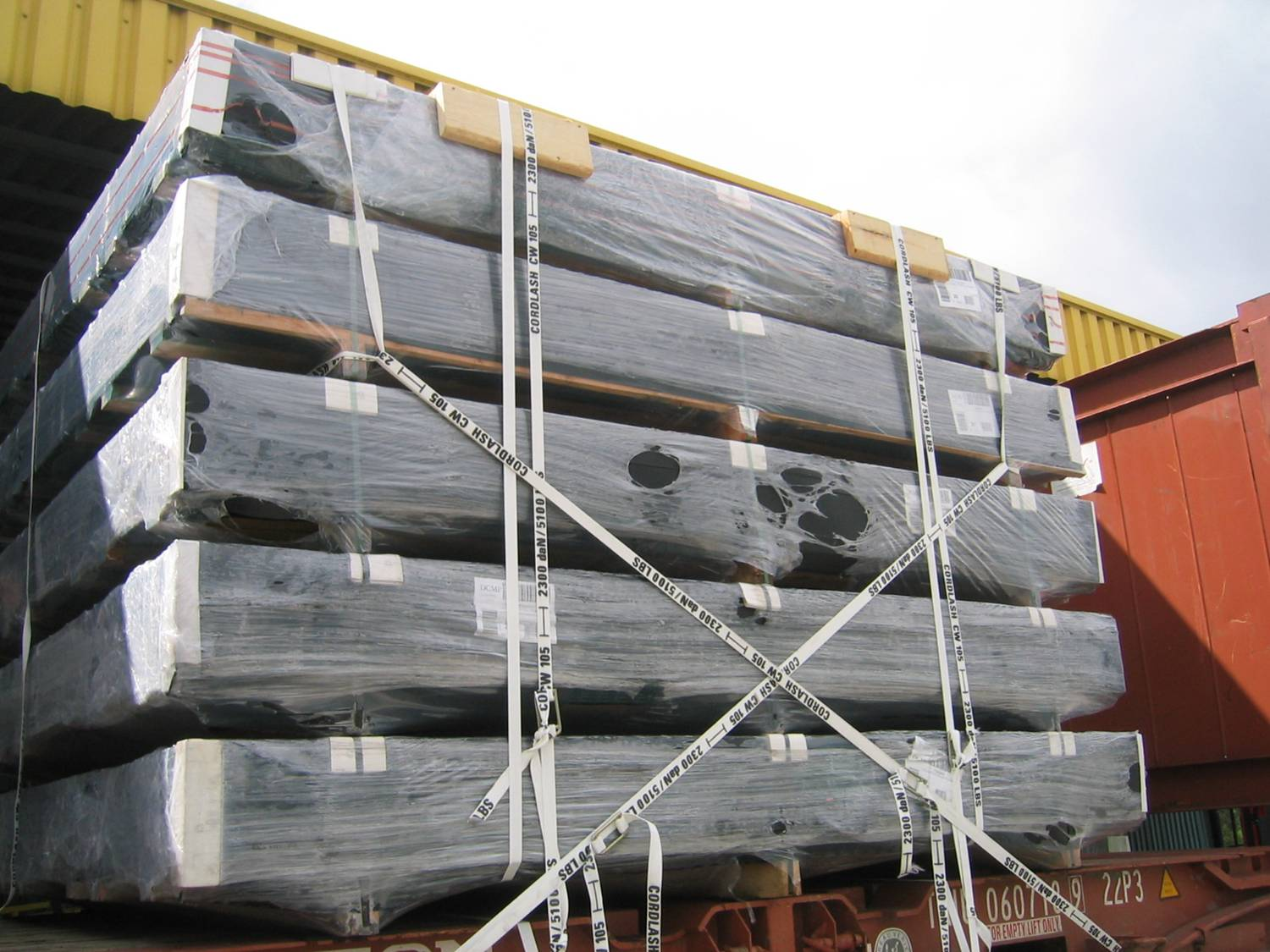
Polyester Lashing application

Lashing is the securing of cargo for transportation with the goal of minimizing shifting. Items used for lashing include ropes, cables, wires, chains, strapping, and nets. These items are anchored to the Cargo Transport Unit (CTU) and tensioned against the cargo. Another form of lashing used four devices attached to the top of each corner of a container. Lashing products and methods are governed by various authorities such as the Association of American Railroads (AAR) for rail transportation in North America, the international Maritime Organization (IMO) for ocean transportation, and the National Motor Freight Traffic Association (NMFTA) and European Union standard EN12195.

=== Dunnage bags ===
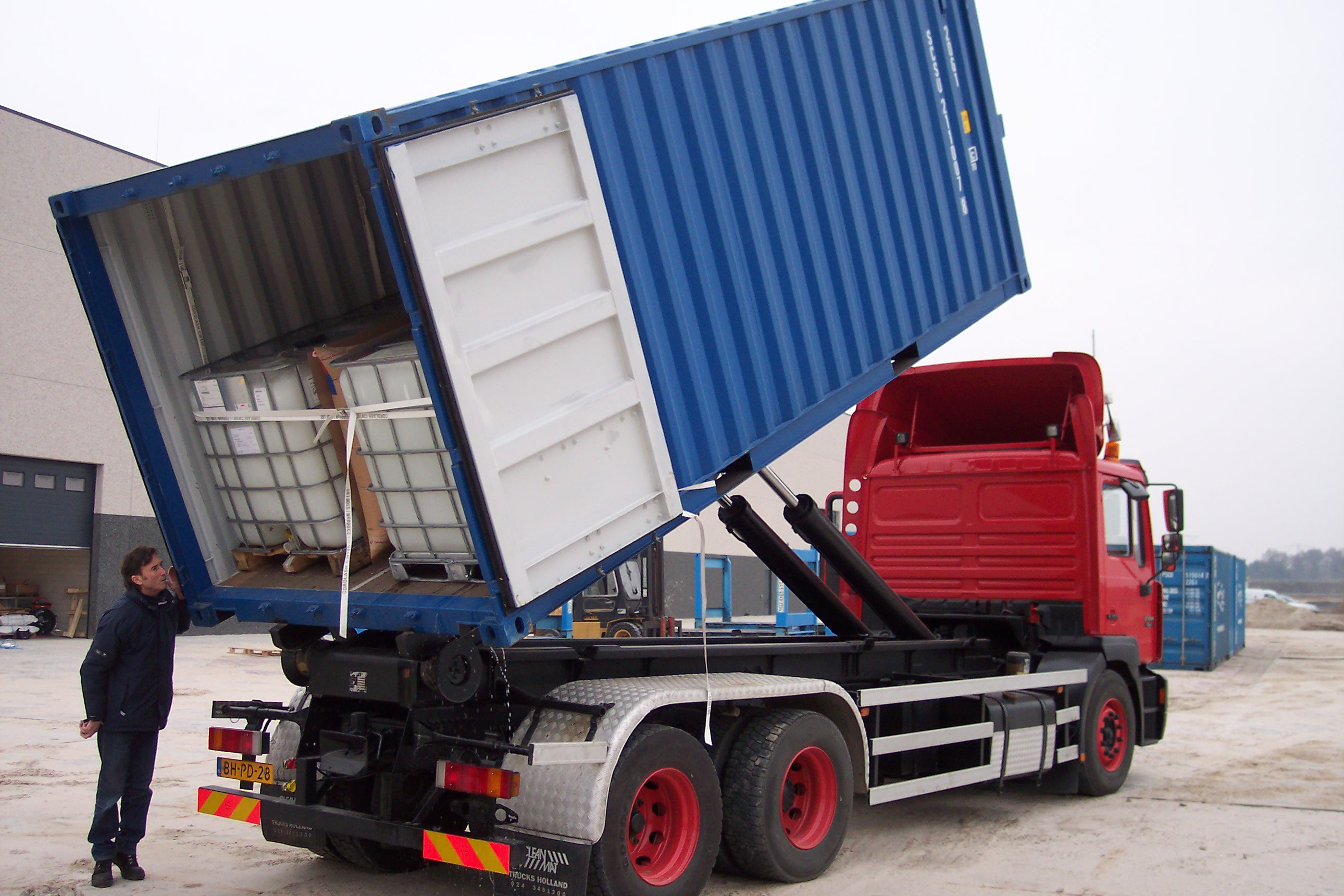
Dunnage bag application in container

Whereas strapping and lashing is often used to secure odd-shaped cargo such as machinery, structures, and vehicles. Dunnage bags are mostly used for homogeneous shaped cargo such as food & beverage products, electronics and appliances and roll paper. Often, strapping/lashing and dunnage bags are used in combination to secure chemical products. Dunnage Bags are not approved for rail transportation of hazardous materials in the United States.

Dunnage bags, also known as air bags, were introduced some 40 years ago as a convenient, fast and cost effective alternative to secure and stabilize cargo in ISO sea containers, closed rail cars, trucks and (ocean-going) vessels. The purpose of dunnage bags is often misunderstood when they are considered as a void filler only to prevent lateral movement of cargo. When properly applied however, dunnage bags form a 3-dimensional bulkhead of the cargo itself preventing both lateral and longitudinal movement. Dunnage bags rely on the Cargo Transport Unit (CTU) construction, which is to be noted when planning. All cargo movements will therefore stress the construction.

=== Tie downs ===
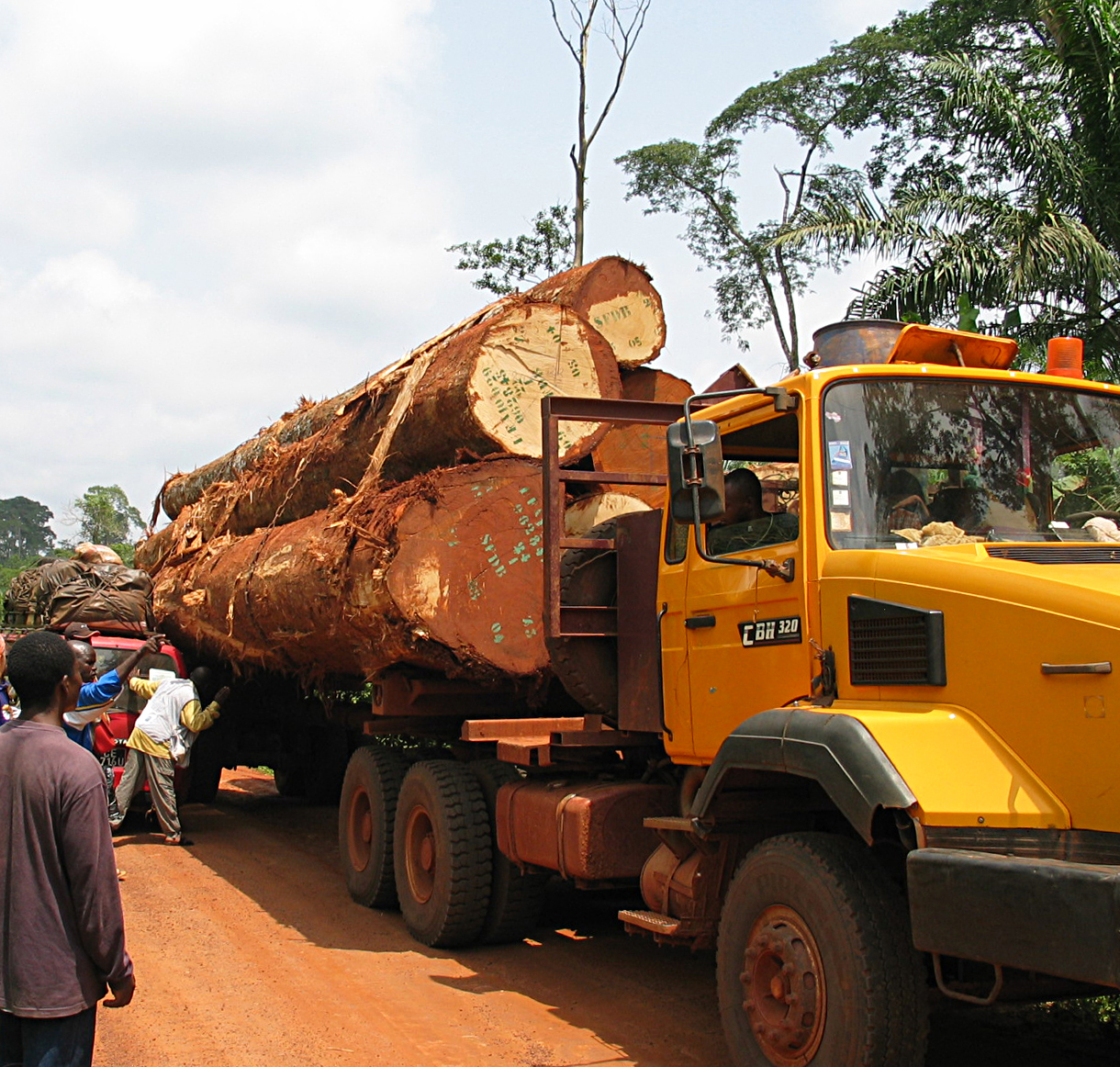
Chains used on logging truck

Heavy loads are sometimes secured to vehicles with tie down straps, heavy duty strapping, or tensioned chains. Heavy objects with round shape like paper rolls can be difficult to secure. Strong woven tarpaulins manufactured to this purpose can then be used. They work in several ways: first of all the ends of the tarpaulin can be used to block the horizontal movement in longitudinal direction as direct spring lashing, secondly the mid part of the tarpaulin work as a top over lashing where the surface pressure caused by tensioning the strapping is evenly distributed over the entire load and thirdly the tarpaulin forms itself according to the cargo form and prohibits horizontal movements of single cargo items.

== See also ==
- Break bulk cargo
- Haulage
- Intermodal freight transport
- Stevedore
- Unit Load Device

== Standards ==
- ASTM D3953 Standard Specification for Strapping, Flat Steel and Seals
- ASTM D3950 Standard Specification for Strapping, Nonmetallic (and Joining Methods)
- ASTM D4649 Guide for Selection and Use of Stretch Wrap Films
- ASTM D4675 Standard Guide for Selection and Use of Flat Strapping Materials
- ASTM D5728 Standard Practices for Securement of Cargo in Intermodal and Unimodal Surface Transport
- EN 12195-1:2010 en - Load restraining on road vehicles - Safety - Part 1: Calculation of securing forces
- EN 12195-2:2000 en - Load restraint assemblies on road vehicles - Safety - Part 2: Web lashing made from man-made fibres
- EN 12195-3:2001 en - Load restraint assemblies on road vehicles - Safety - Part 3: Lashing chains
- EN 12195-4:2004 en - Load restraint assemblies on road vehicles - Safety - Part 4: Lashing steel wire ropes
- EN 12195-1:2010/C1:2013 en - Load restraining on road vehicles - Safety - Part 1: Calculation of securing forces
- EN 12195-1:2010/C2:2014 en - Load restraining on road vehicles - Safety - Part 1: Calculation of securing forces
