= List of webbing equipment =

There are many present and past designs of webbing equipment – load-carrying aids mainly of military application.

== 0–9 ==
- 1908 pattern webbing
- 1937 pattern webbing – UK, 1937 onwards
- 1942 battle jerkin
- 1970 pattern webbing
- 44 pattern webbing
- 58 pattern webbing - UK, 1958 to 1990s
- 61 pattern webbing
- 72 pattern webbing
- 85 pattern Personal load carrying equipment (PLCE)
- 90 pattern PLCE
- 95 pattern PLCE

== A ==
- All-purpose lightweight individual carrying equipment (ALICE) – US, 1973
- ARVN rucksack

== B ==
- Bataleur 90
- Buzo Tactico Assault Vest

== C ==
- Correaje argentino de cuero
- Correaje Tempex

== F ==
- Fireforce webbing

== I ==
- Improved load-bearing equipment
- Individual integrated fighting system

== M ==
- M-1956 load-carrying equipment
- Modernized load-carrying equipment (M-1967)
- MOLLE (modular lightweight load-carrying equipment)

== N ==
- Niemoller battle vest

== O ==
- One Zero assault vest

== P ==
- Personal load carrying equipment
- Pouch Attachment Ladder System

== R ==
- Recce battle vest

== U ==
- UTV webbing

== See also ==
- Load-bearing vest
