= 39 pattern webbing =

British military equipment

The 1939 pattern webbing was an item of military load-carrying equipment used in the Second World War. It was a leather variant of the 1937 pattern web equipment.

== History ==
In 1939, at the beginning of the Second World War, the number of troops in the British Army stood at roughly 200,000. This number rose to 2,000,000 with the introduction of National Service and the activation of reservists. The rapid increase resulted in a lack of proper equipment. Manufacturers of the webbing product—at the time a treated cotton variant, pattern 37—could not keep up with demand. This led the British government to commission the leather industry to design an alternative. The British army had faced the same problem in the First World War, when troops were deployed with the 1908 pattern webbing. The issue was resolved by introducing the 1914 pattern web.

The difference between 1937 and 1939 pattern webbing, besides materials used in manufacturing, came down to the latter not being issued with a backpack. If troops needed a backpack, pattern 37 haversacks and packs were used.

The government placed an initial order of one million sets of leather infantry equipment pattern 39. Unlike the pattern 14 design used in World War I, pattern 39 was never used at the front line. It was employed only for training purposes and by rear line troops, including troops in the UK Home Guard.

Once the 1937 pattern webbing production numbers could meet the needs of the British troops again, pattern 39 was withdrawn and reissued to the Belgian, Dutch, Czech and Polish armies. The Belgians and Dutch carried on using it post-war.

== See also ==
- 1908 pattern webbing
- 1914 pattern webbing
- 1937 pattern webbing
- 1958 pattern webbing
