= Fireforce webbing =

Fireforce webbing was a webbing used by Fireforce of the Rhodesian Army during the Rhodesian Bush War. A battle jerkin and chest rig were known items. It was made by Fereday & Sons of Salisbury.

== Battle jerkin ==
The battle jerkin was an assault vest, similar to that used by the British during WW2. It first came in olive green, later in disruptive camouflage.

== Chest rig ==
The chest rig was not an issue item, soldiers would purchase a variety of different styles from civilian manufacturers such as North or Feredays. The main use of the chest rigs was as a platform for the carriage of rifle magazines. The main inspiration for these items is clearly seen in Chinese Communist chest rigs of the Vietnam war era. These in turn influenced European models of the early 1980s and the Pattern 83 chestrig is also very similar.

== See also ==
- List of webbing equipment
