= 61 pattern webbing =

The 1961 pattern webbing equipment, also referred to as the 63 pattern and 61/64 pattern, was the first load-bearing equipment system of the Republic of South Africa, issued to the South African army. The system was copied by the Rhodesian army as the 69 pattern webbing.

== 61 pattern ==
In May 1961 South Africa changed from being a Union to a Republic. During the same period, the newly renamed SADF adopted the R1, an FAL variant. To accompany the new rifle, a webbing system was developed, based on the British 1958 pattern, which had seen use in nearby Malawi by British forces.

This set differed from the original in a number of ways. Generally, the materials were thinner and of an inferior quality than the British version, being non-preshrunk and faster fading. There were a number of differences in certain pouches, particularly the ammunition pouches. The yoke also had extra hardware for fastening additional magazine pouches or 37 pattern small packs. As the SADF adopted a water bottled patterned on the one then issued by the Bundeswehr, its pouch differed significantly from the 58 pattern equivalent.

== 64 pattern ==
After receiving feedback regarding the new webbing sets, a modified version referred to as the 64 pattern after its year of introduction replaced the 61 pattern, although both served concurrently until 61 pattern stocks were worn through. The canvas quality was improved and was now preshrunk and color fast dyed, as well as being somewhat greener in shade compared to previous production. A redesigned water bottle pouch was issued, resembling the British pattern 44 design. In official documentation, both the term Pattern 63 as well as 61/64 were used t refer to the systems.

== 70 pattern ==
A further, more radical revision of the system came with the 1970 pattern, which marked the final evolution of the system. The universal large front magazine pouch design, inherited from the 37 pattern was replaced with smaller magazine pouches for two R1 magazines, or larger pouches which held two Bren magazines. The previously separate rear "kidney pouches" were now joined by a strip of webbing belt and each had two magazine pockets added, one on top and one on the outer side. The main belt of the system was split and intended to be joined by the kidney pouches, leading many soldiers to continue using older belts. Finally, the backpack was significantly redesigned.

== Replacement ==
The 61 pattern and its derivatives, as well as the 58 pattern it was derived from proved to be very poorly suited for the types of combat the SADF found itself engaged in. One of the biggest problems was that the main backpack could not be worn independently but had to be worn in conjunction with the yoke. It was also very difficult to put on and take off. Besides that, seeing that the back pack was attached to the yoke, balance was a major issue. As the SADF engaged in unconventional warfare in Rhodesia, Southwest Africa and Angola, it turned to the equipment of its foes and took inspiration from developments within the Rhodesian security forces that resulted in the highly modern 84 Pattern system. Surplus 61/64 and 70 pattern webbing was supplied to UNITA forces, and to a lesser degree, RENAMO.
