= Personal Load Carrying Equipment =

Tactical webbing systems of the British Armed Forces

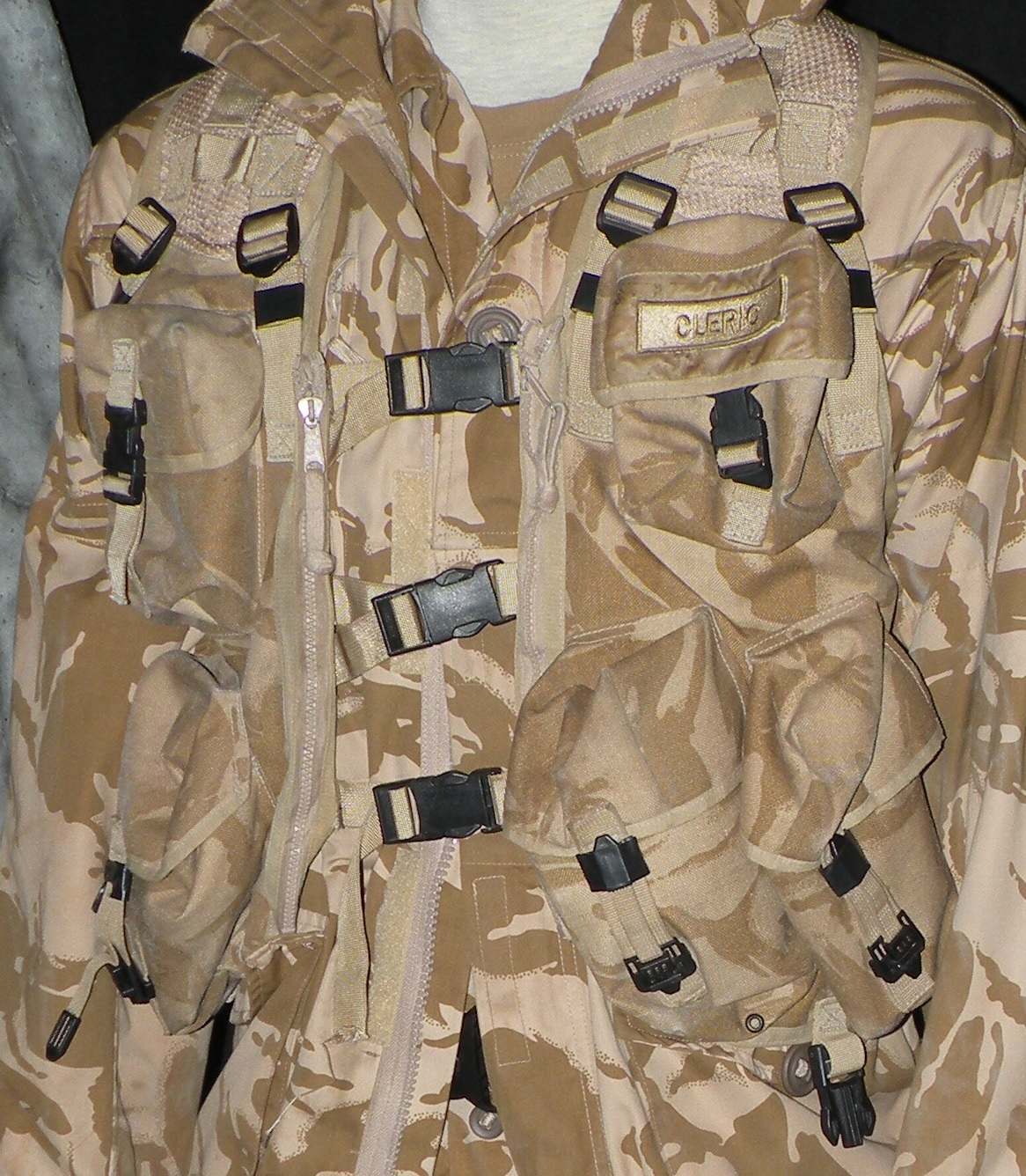
- Desert DPM version of the PLCE vest.
- Type: Web Gear
- Place of origin: United Kingdom

Service history
- Used by: See Users

Production history
- Variants: See Variants

Personal load carrying equipment (PLCE) is one of several tactical webbing systems of the British Armed Forces. Dependent upon the year of design, and the decade of introduction, the webbing system was named and is commonly referred to as the 85 Pattern, the 90 Pattern or the 95 Pattern webbing.

The basic configuration consists of a belt, a shoulder harness and a number of pouches. Associated with the PLCE webbing system is a series of other similar load carrying equipment, individual items and rucksacks that are produced of the same materials and which are compatible.

== Purpose ==
The purpose of the PLCE webbing system is to retain the means by which a soldier may operate for 48 hours or conduct a mission-specific task. Items and components may include a variety of munitions and weapon ancillaries, a three-fold entrenching tool, a bayonet, food and water (including a means to heat water and prepare food), chemical, biological, radiological, and nuclear (CBRN) protective clothing and communications equipment. Soldiers often carry other personal items such as waterproof clothing and spare socks.

== History ==
The PLCE webbing system replaced the 58 pattern webbing, which was olive drab/olive green (OD/OG) in colour and made of canvas. This system, after having been introduced to the forces in 1960 and considered long obsolete by 1980, was still part of the standard-issue equipment of the British Armed Forces during the Falklands War in 1982.

To address the common issues with canvas materials, such as shrinking and accelerated degradation in damp climates, arctic conditions, or prolonged exposure to wet terrain, military load-bearing systems—beyond those used by the British Armed Forces—have been redesigned to include or be made from newer and more durable synthetic materials.

During the Vietnam War, the United States Armed Forces had introduced and serviced the M-1967 modernized load-carrying equipment (MLCE) in 1968 and later the all-purpose lightweight individual carrying equipment (ALICE) in 1974. Both systems had incorporated non-decomposing synthetic fabrics and were produced of highly durable nylon.

Following this influential lead and reconsidering the progression and renewal of military load bearing systems around the world, Britain developed 72 pattern webbing, which mainly consisted of two ammunition pouches, to be worn on the front and a field pack, to be worn on the back, made of Polyurethane-coated nylon and Butyl rubber. This system was never generally issued but was a Troop Trials Equipment.

The National People's Army (Nationale Volksarmee) of the German Democratic Republic designed and introduced the Uniformtrageversuch 85–90 (UTV 85–90), resembling, with the exception of the clothing system, a modified duplicate of the British Type 58 Pattern webbing, inheriting very similar features in appearance and function. The shoulder harness was of identical design, the belt had featured the use of identical buckles and 58 Pattern C-hooks had been incorporated in all components. Complementary items, such as pouches, had been changed in design and size, to meet Warsaw Pact requirements. The webbing system and components were produced of more robust nylon and featured the Strichtarn camouflage pattern. Whilst this late improvement was observed by the British Armed Forces and being found to be an affront, especially against the British Army of the Rhine (BAOR), no further considerations have been made, as the testing of prototypic PLCE equipment was already underway.

== Variants ==
=== 85 pattern ===
Developments resumed with the progression of the firearms development and introduction of the SA80 family of British small arms. Trials of experimental PLCE webbing and combat body armour (CBA) were conducted with selected units in 1984 and 1985. Being very similar to the first standard issue PLCE webbing system, it used snaps of proprietary design for closure on all pouches.

=== 90 pattern ===
Seven years after the Falklands War, the first standard issue PLCE webbing was introduced in 1989 as the 90 pattern webbing and was olive (OD/OG) in colour.

The original components used Type 58 pattern C-hooks for the belt attachment, and angled D-rings for the shoulder harness attachment on the ammunition pouches. There were separate left and right pouches. The first utility pouches in production had additional belt attachments for high mounting, similar to the ammunition pouches of the 1937 pattern web equipment or 44 pattern. Later produced PLCE webbing of the 90 pattern incorporates ambidextrous yoke fittings and the standard PLCE webbing belt attachments (see below).

The PLCE webbing system was also adopted by the Danish Defence Forces (Forsvaret) in the M84 camouflage pattern and by the Defence Forces of Ireland (Óglaigh na hÉireann) in olive drab. The permanent and reserve defence forces now employ the integrated protection and load-carrying system (IPLCS).

Many other countries still issue or have issued similar load bearing systems. By way of example, in its year of introduction to the forces, the United States Armed Forces have adopted the individual integrated fighting system (IIFS).

The newest variant of the PLCE webbing system, of the 90 pattern, has been in production since 1992 and has the Disruptive Pattern Material (DPM) camouflage pattern of the partially obsolete Combat Soldier 95 ("Soldier 95") clothing system. The official name remained unchanged.

=== 95 pattern ===
With the introduction of the Combat Soldier 95 (CS95 or "Soldier 95") clothing system in 1995, the common misconception arose that a complete revision of the 90 Pattern PLCE webbing system was taking place. The clothing system underwent final development and entered troop trials in between 1992 and 1995. Garments were manufactured for the trials, yet the PLCE webbing system issued, officially remained of the 90 Pattern.

Due to confusion, or for the sake of convenience, individual components of the webbing system, were by 1995, unofficially named, described and specified as the Type 95 pattern webbing, as having been widely understood to be part of the Combat Soldier 95 clothing system. No official name change had taken place. The only array of PLCE components that could be considered of the unofficial 95 pattern, are those components produced during or after that year.

== Construction ==
The PLCE webbing system is produced from double-layered 1,000 Denier internally rubberised Cordura Nylon, a long lasting and hard wearing fabric. Olive webbing of the same material ("1000 D") is being incorporated, along with a variety of hard wearing plastic fasteners (ITW Nexus), Hook and loop fasteners (Velcro) and anti-magnetic press stud fasteners ("pull the dot").

The pouches are opened and closed with Spanish tab fasteners, they can be closed in two ways, quick release or secure. Small sections of Velcro, sewn on the inside of the lids of the pouches and the top front section of the pouches, allow for easy and effortless fastening. Added silencer strips allow them to be covered when not needed.

A standard ammunition pouch as issued ("pouch, ammunition, universal, DPM, IRR") has two pockets; single pocket versions ("pouch, ammunition (other arms), DPM, IRR") are available for those not required to carry as much ammunition. Pouches designated to hold ammunition initially contained a dividing strip to hold two magazines in separate compartments and eliminate rattle. Some soldiers, especially infantry soldiers, often removed these dividing strips to make it easier to insert and remove magazines. They also found that three magazines would then fit comfortably and without excessive noise, giving a total capacity of twelve magazines per person in a standard fighting configuration. Later issue ammunition pouches were manufactured without dividers, as eight magazines was not thought to be sufficient for sustained firefights. Without dividers, each pouch can alternatively contain one grenade.

Infrared reflective (IRR) coating and dyes are incorporated in all fabric and webbing of the PLCE webbing system, which replicates the near-infrared reflectance of natural foliage. For example, green foliage is highly reflective to near-infrared light and thus appears white when viewed through IR optics (or bright green through night vision). The IRR camouflage pattern therefore works correctly when viewed through infrared night vision optics just as it does in visible light. Non-IRR fabric would appear as a solid colour dependent on its reflectance and the camouflage pattern would be lost.

== Order of dress ==
The Infantry Trials and Development Unit (ITDU), based in Warminster, conducted trials with the PLCE webbing system. It had decided for the system to be fit for purpose, and divided the system into three orders of dress:

- Assault Order.

The Assault Order consists of the essentials needed to conduct a military task in the theatre of war. Ammunition, the water bottle, the entrenching tool, the bayonet, the helmet, and CBRN (chemical, biological, radiological, and nuclear) protective clothing (stowed in one of the detachable side pouches of the rucksack) is to be carried on operations and patrols of only short duration.

- Combat Order.

The Combat Order is the Assault Order in addition to the means of stowage for rations and personal equipment, that enable the British soldier to live and fight for a period of 24 hours. The second side pouch of the rucksack is now carried. In practice, the patrol packs are used by many units and individual soldiers instead of the side pouches, as they are to be found larger in size and more convenient.

- Marching Order.

The Marching Order is the Combat Order in addition to the carrying of the rucksack (Bergen) and is the fighting load required for operations of up to the duration of two weeks, without means of resupply, except for ammunition, rations and water. The complete Bergen (with side pouches attached) is being carried.

== Configuration ==
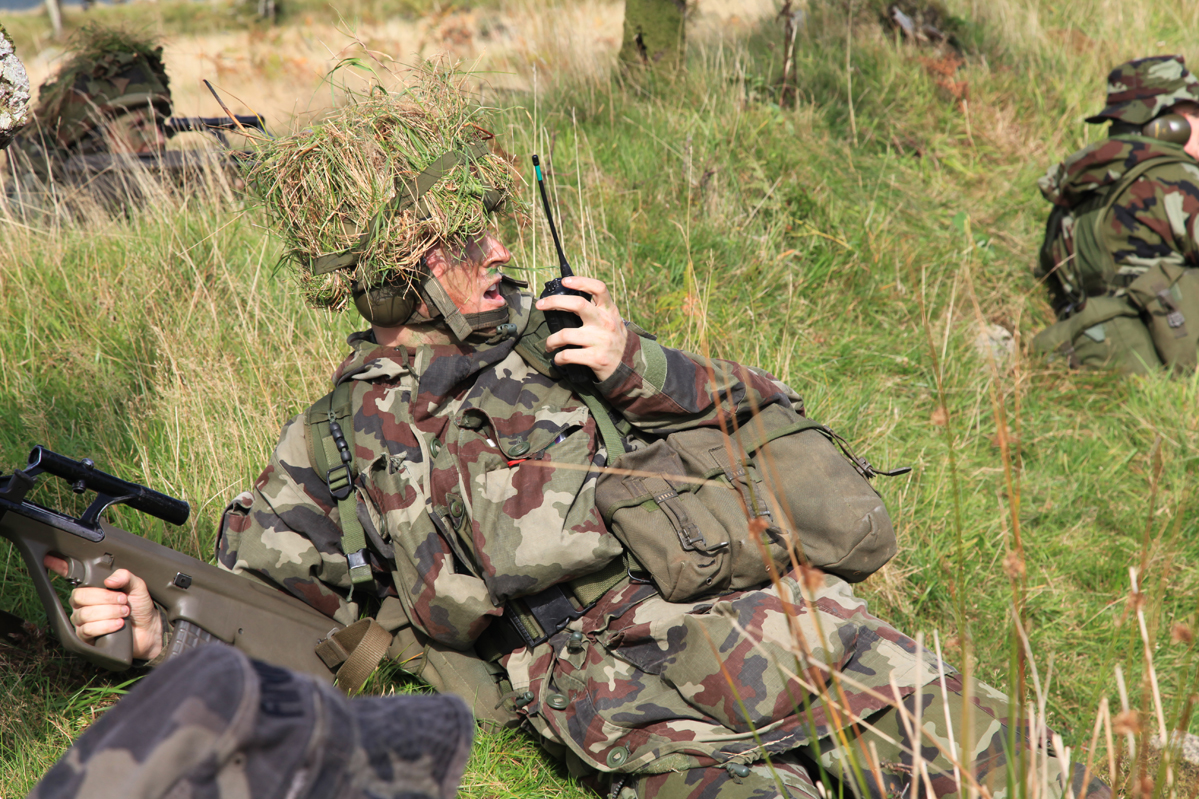
Irish Army Reserve soldier wearing an olive-green PLCE set in 2010; this style of set is essentially identical to initial British Armed Forces sets. Visible are the left-hand-side ammunition pouch and a utility or water bottle pouch.

The initial basis of the PLCE webbing system is the belt; it features two D-rings at the back to attach to the shoulder harness, and many rows of narrow vertical slots sewn into the fabric. Two or more front pouches (ammunition or utility) attach to the belt; these have belt loops and feature T-Bar plastic tab attachments to provide more stability and security when connected to the belt. Every major component of the PLCE webbing system features two T-Bar plastic tab attachments.

The six-point shoulder harness attaches to the two D-rings on the belt and the two A-rings on each front pouch chosen. This benefits the distribution of weight and allows for a more comfortable carry, than provided with the use of a four-point shoulder harness. Pouches that are to be worn on the back (field pack, utility, water bottle, respirator, wire cutter, entrenching tool) attach to the belt using the same loop and tab system.

The detachable side pouches of a Bergen (pouch, side, rucksack, DPM, IRR) can be attached to the dedicated shoulder harness (yoke, pouch side, rucksack, DPM, IRR) to construct a day-sack.

== Scaling ==
In 1997, the Defence Clothing and Textile Agency had decided that the issue of 1990 pattern (infantry)-type PLCE to individual soldiers was to be scaled as follows:

- 01. 1x carrier, entrenching tool
- 02. 2x pouch side, rucksack
- 03. 1x carrier, water canteen
- 04. 2x pouch, ammunition, universal
- 05. 1x pouch, utility
- 06. 1x haversack, respirator
- 07. 1x yoke, main
- 08. 1x yoke, pouch side, rucksack
- 09. 2x strap, pouch side, yoke
- 10. 1x belt, waist (of appropriate size)
- 11. 2x strap, utility, O/D, IRR
- 12. 1x bayonet, frog, DPM, IRR
- 13. 1x rucksack (infantry) (of appropriate size)
- 14. 1x bag, insertion, rucksack
- 15. 2x bag, insertion, pouch, side, rucksack
- 16. 1x bag, transparent, PLCE, rucksack
- 17. 2x bag, transparent, PLCE, pouch, side, rucksack

The standard-issue accoutrement today, dependent upon the branch of service, was changed to the capacity of two front pouches (pouch, ammunition, universal, DPM, IRR) instead of one. To this, privately purchased water bottle or utility pouches and hip pads are often added. The entrenching tool pouch (carrier, entrenching tool case, DPM, IRR) is sometimes used as an alternative water bottle pouch.

Multi Terrain Pattern (MTP) PLCE is replacing all Disruptive Pattern Material (DPM) PLCE as the core issued webbing equipment for the British Armed Forces, this program started in 2015.

== Components ==
The following example of individual components, are all current issue items of the British Armed Forces, however many commercial variants are available.

- Webbing:
  - yoke, main, DPM, IRR. [NSN 8465-99-132-1560]
  - belt, waist, small, OD, IRR. [NSN 8465-99-132-1563]
  - strap, utility, OD, IRR. [NSN 8465-99-132-1566]
  - strap, waist, O/A. [NSN 8465-99-730-2314] (OD)
  - pad, hip protection, DPM, IRR. [NSN 8465-99-869-0392]
  - pouch, ammunition, universal, DPM, IRR. [8465-99-132-1557]
  - pouch, ammunition (other arms), DPM, IRR. [NSN 8465-99-978-5367]
  - pouch, utility, DPM, IRR. [NSN 8465-99-132-1558]
  - pouch, radio, DPM, IRR, N.I. [NSN 8465-99-978-7651]
  - haversack, respirator, DPM, IRR. [NSN 8465-99-132-1559]
  - carrier, water canteen, DPM, IRR. [NSN 8465-99-132-1556]
  - carrier, entrenching tool case, DPM, IRR. [NSN 8465-99-132-1554]
  - frog, bayonet, DPM, IRR. [NSN 8465-99-132-1567]
  - frog, bayonet, IRR. [NSN 8465-99-011-2306] (OD)
  - sheath, jungle knife, DPM, IRR. [NSN 8465-99-341-8350]
  - sheath, machete, DPM, IRR. [NSN 8465-99-495-9250]
  - holster, pistol (other arms), DPM, IRR. [NSN 8465-99-978-5365]
  - holster, O/A, R/H, DPM, IRR. [NSN 8465-99-306-0049]
  - harness, holster, other arms, DPM, IRR. [NSN 8465-99-978-5366]
  - bag, ammunition. [NSN 8465-99-679-8281] (Manufactured to hold 200 rounds of ammunition for the FN Minimi light machine gun.)
  - yoke, pouch side, rucksack, DPM, IRR. [NSN 8465-99-132-1561]
- Ancillaries:
  - plain other arms scabbard for bayonet (fits inside frog)
  - SA80 infantry scabbard for bayonet with sharpening stone and saw/wire cutters (fits inside frog)
- Auxiliaries:
  - harness panel, drop leg, desert DPM. [NSN 8465-99-562-6399]
  - holster, pistol, L/H. [NSN 1095-99-869-2071] (BLK)
  - water bottle pouch. [NSN 8415-99-461-4942] (DDPM)
  - pouch, knife/torch. [NSN 8415-99-461-4936] (DDPM)
  - individual hydration system. [NSN 8465-99-842-7034] (DPM) (Camelbak Products, LLC)
  - individual hydration system. [NSN 8465-99-687-2284] (DDPM) (Camelbak Products, LLC)
  - field pack. [NSN 4240-99-800-9601] (DDPM)
  - field pack. [NSN 8465-99-434-6734] (MTP)
- Tactical equipment:
  - chest webbing, DPM, IRR, N.I. [NSN 8465-99-978-7650] (Chest Rig with three ammunition pouches, two utility pouches and a map pocket.)
  - pouch, rifle grenade, G.S., DPM, IRR. [NSN 8465-99-616-7708] (Now technically obsolete, with the adoption of the SA80 with UGL.)
  - bandolier, G.P., DPM, IRR. [NSN 1305-99-701-8285]
  - underslung grenade launcher (UGL) Bandolier. [NSN 1310-99-246-1848]
  - 11 round 40 mm grenade, bandolier, Woodland DPM. [NSN 1305-99-371-1332] (BCB International Limited)
  - waistcoat, mans, general purpose ops. [NSN 8405-99-527-1800] (All arms waistcoat with two ammunition pouches, four utility pouches, two general purpose pouches and two pockets.)
- Medical equipment:
  - pack medical, battlefield ambulance, DPM, IRR. [NSN 6545-99-131-3964]
  - pouch medical, DPM, IRR. [NSN 8465-99-978-4567] (First-Aid Trauma Pack)
  - pouch medical, side rucksack, DPM, IRR. [NSN 8465-99-130-9326]
- Rucksacks:
  - patrol pack, 30 Litre, DPM, IRR. [NSN 8465-99-869-3875]
  - rucksack and frame, (INF) long convoluted back, DPM, IRR. [NSN 8465-99-978-9220] (Bergen) (Rucksack, infantry, or all arms in later manufacture.) (100 Litres)
  - rucksack and frame, (INF) short convoluted back, DPM, IRR. [NSN 8465-99-978-9221] (Bergen)
  - pouch, side, rucksack, DPM, IRR. [NSN 8465-99-132-1555]
  - rucksack and frame, (INF) long convoluted back, MTP, IRR. [NSN 8465-99-361-7307] (Bergen)
  - rucksack, radio carrier, DPM, IRR. [NSN 5820-99-869-211] (Allows comfortable carry of Model 320, 350, 351, 352 and Cougar radios.)
  - rucksack, other arms, DPM, IRR. [NSN 8465-99-978-5364] (A smaller Bergen with holdall-style carrying handles and pack-away shoulder straps, designed to be carried in vehicles.)
  - field pack, air support back, DPM, IRR. [NSN 8485-99-380-6492] (Large rucksack with 6 external pouches on the rear, and provision for an extra side pouch to be attached across the top. This item has been issued to some SF, pathfinder and STA patrol troops of the British Armed Forces.)

== Assault vest ==
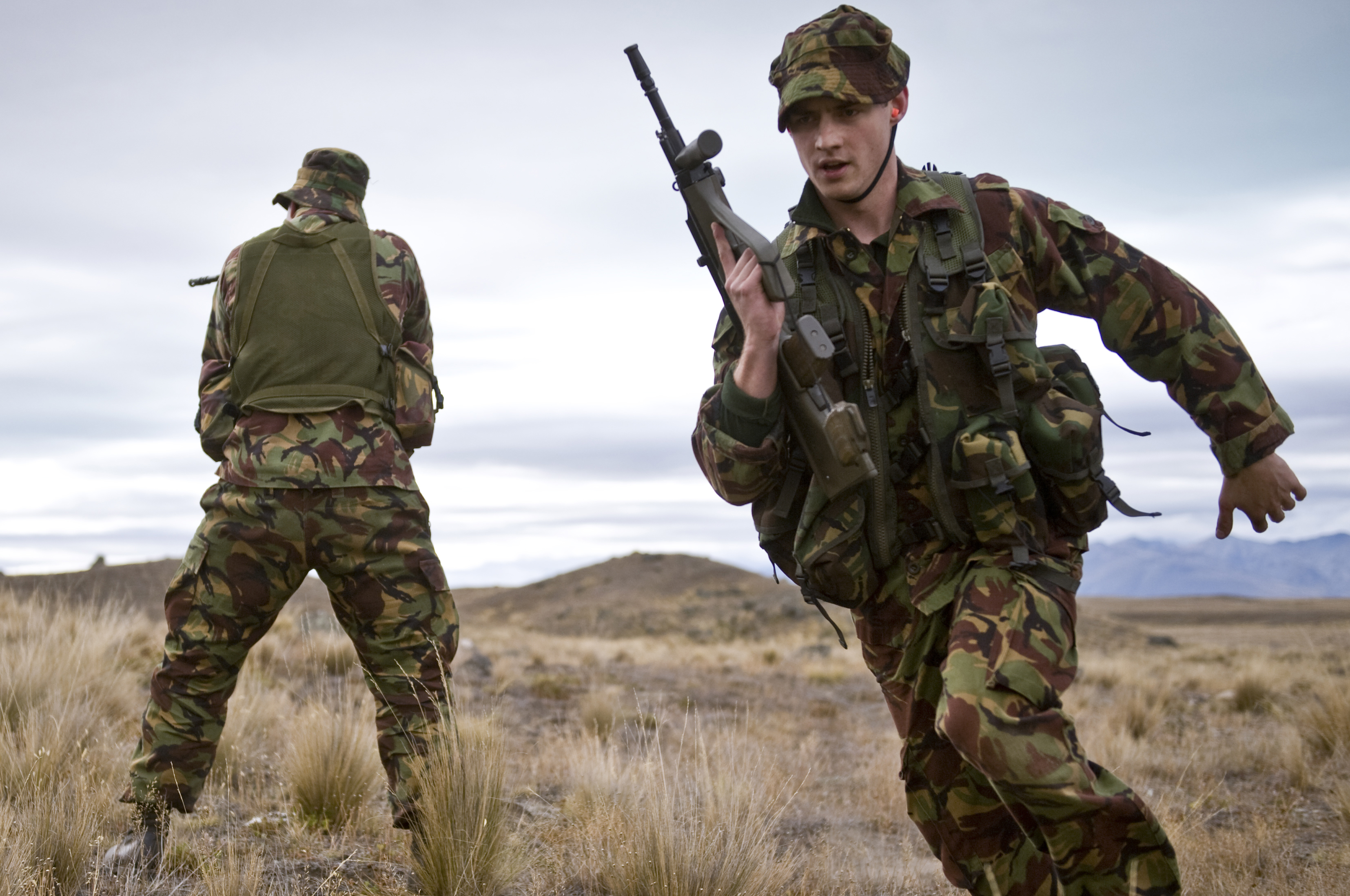
Assault vest as worn by a Queen Alexandra's Mounted Rifles soldier

A new standard-issue piece of equipment (Waistcoat, Mans, General Purpose Ops.) that was designed for carrying essential items on a more secure platform than the original webbing system.

This consists of a typical waistcoat design, fastened with three ITW Nexus clips. Two triple ammunition pouches are situated on the left hand side of the coat, along with a utility pouch, small utility pouch and a zippered pocket with an internal holster. The right side is similar but with three large utility pouches, along with a small utility pouch and again a zippered pocket with notepad holder. All pouches open and close with ITW Nexus clips as well as having storm seals.

The vest is adjusted through four ladderlock fasteners and webbing, the shoulders are adjustable with Velcro material. The concept is to gain a secure load carrying system that fits over body armour comfortably. There are various types of this vest depending upon the year of manufacture. The originals are as described above but newer models have loops on the left side for the bayonet frog, clips for a large hydration pouch, name patches on the left side, and a small utility pouch. Most recently, the Spanish tab fasteners are being incorporated again, instead of the ITW Nexus clips.

The standard-issue assault vest, depending on the operational requirements, is available in either the Disruptive Pattern Material (DPM) camouflage pattern, or the Desert DPM (DDPM) camouflage pattern. Commercial variants are available in multiple colours, such as Black, Green, or the American Desert Camouflage Uniform (DCU) camouflage pattern.

== Criticism ==
The main criticism of the PLCE webbing system amongst members of the British Armed Forces is that the belt is prone to slipping. Some soldiers opt to change the plastic buckle for a Roll-Pin type, whereby the belt is threaded and tightened each time it is put on.

== Future ==
In 2015, VIRTUS, the Personal Protective Equipment and Load Carriage System, began being issued to high readiness units.

Due to the introduction and constant improvement of protective equipment, such as the Osprey Body Armour (OBA), the PLCE webbing system is incompatible so Osprey Mk 4 has a MOLLE belt and under armour Yoke to allow Osprey pouches to be used as belt equipment.

After the first introduction in 1989, PLCE in its current MTP form is still Britain's core issue webbing equipment which is compatible with ECBA armour and Mk 6 and 7 helmet, with Osprey issued to non-deployed infantry, leaving Virtus issued to deployed Infantry Commando and Parachute Units.

Most other nations are developing, or have developed more modular load bearing systems, such as the modular lightweight load-carrying equipment (MOLLE) which is being widely employed by most branches of the United States Armed Forces. Following this major improvement, the Pouch Attachment Ladder System (PALS) had been incorporated into the Osprey Body Armour (OBA) platform, which is currently being issued to British troops on operations world-wide.

== Users ==
- Denmark: As the Oppakningssystem M/96.
- Ireland
- Kuwait: digital desert version -PLCE assault vest
- Malta
- United Kingdom
