= 72 pattern webbing =

The 1972 pattern webbing was intended to replace the 58 pattern webbing, but never got beyond user trials. It was made from PU-coated nylon to counter the Soviet NBC capability with a general look closer to an Individual integrated fighting system load-bearing vest. It was designed to be used in wide variety of environments such as jungles, deserts and was configurable for use, ranging from short-duration jungle patrols to general infantry use.

== Components ==
Ammunition pouches

The two front pouches were manufactured from a double layer of PU-nylon material for rigidity and abrasion resistance, mounted on a double-thickness backing section. Each pouch held one 20 round 7.62mm rifle magazine and was fastened with a press stud. A broad nylon strap with a quick-release buckle was stitched directly to each pouch instead of a more conventional belt. At the bottom was a tab with two eyelets hanging loops for a Parang, Kukri or Machete scabbard.

Utility pouches

Each could hold a water bottle, mess tin or up to four 20-round magazines / 200 belted machine gun rounds and was fastened with a quick-release buckle of the same pattern as American ammunition pouches. The left-hand pouch had a bayonet frog.

Backpack

The backpack, or haversack, had eyelets and a paracord drawstring with cord lock. The lid of the pack is fastened with two straps and adjustable green buckles. On the underside of the pack lid are two straps with similar green buckles to allow a rolled poncho or waterproofs to be stowed. Two horizontal nylon straps with adjuster buckles around the outer face of the pack are used to compress the contents. On the underside is a long narrow carrier for the lightweight pick head.

Yoke

The yoke arrangement is similar to ’58 Pattern, though the strap adjustment was much simpler. The haversack had a similar pick handle storage attachment arrangement to ’58 webbing between the shoulder blades. It is attached to the rear of the yoke with the help of two doubled ¾ inch wide nylon straps passing through plastic D-rings on the top rear of the sack and adjustable at the yoke end by the same type of green buckle used elsewhere. The front and back strap arrangements allowed the webbing to be easily drawn in or let out dependent on load. A pair of straps was also fastened to D-rings threaded onto the rear yoke straps, to allow a sleeping bag or poncho to be carried on top.

The '72 haversack could be repositioned to sit lower on the back allowing a radio or small bergen to be worn above it. This was effected by connecting the knapsack straps to a set of lower buckles beneath the ammunition pouches, and then adjusting the side straps accordingly.
