= Correaje Tempex =

Webbing equipment used by Argentine military

The Correaje Tempex was a webbing equipment used by the Argentine military at the end of the Junta era and in the Falklands War replacing the "outdated" but durable green leather webbing used at the time.

== See also ==
- Buzos Tacticos assault vest
