= Load-bearing vest =

Vest to carry many small items

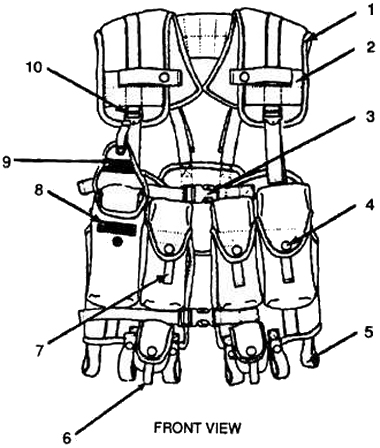
IIFS tactical load-bearing vest

A load-bearing vest (LBV) or load-carrying vest is a vest designed for carrying a large number of small pieces, commonly used by military, police, firefighters, backpackers, handymen (tool vest), etc. The purpose is the same as for webbing equipment in military. Tactical vests may carry out load-bearing function.

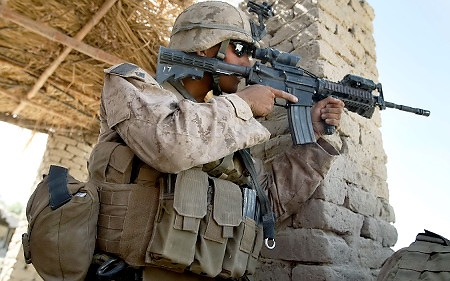
US marine in a tactical vest

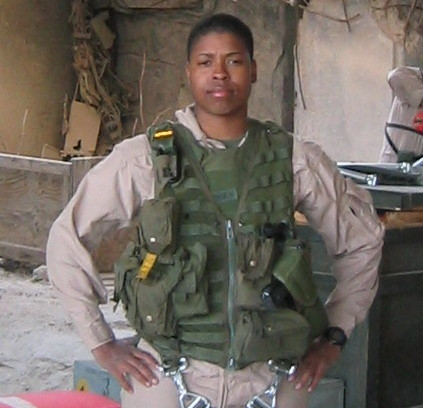
Vernice Armour in her flight gear

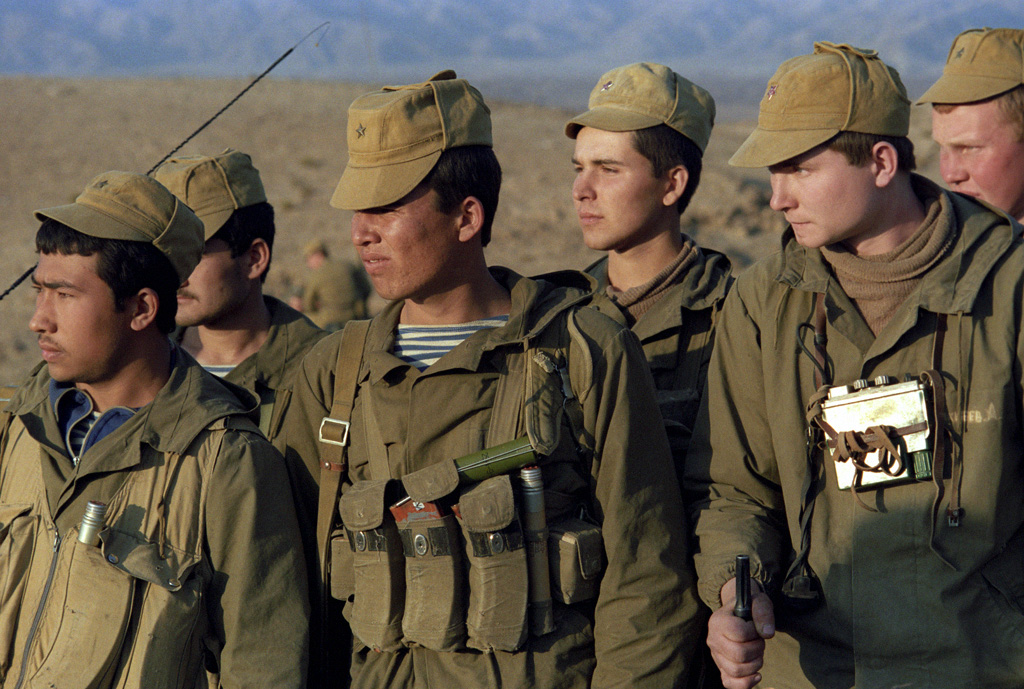
Russian spetsnaz in razgruzka gear

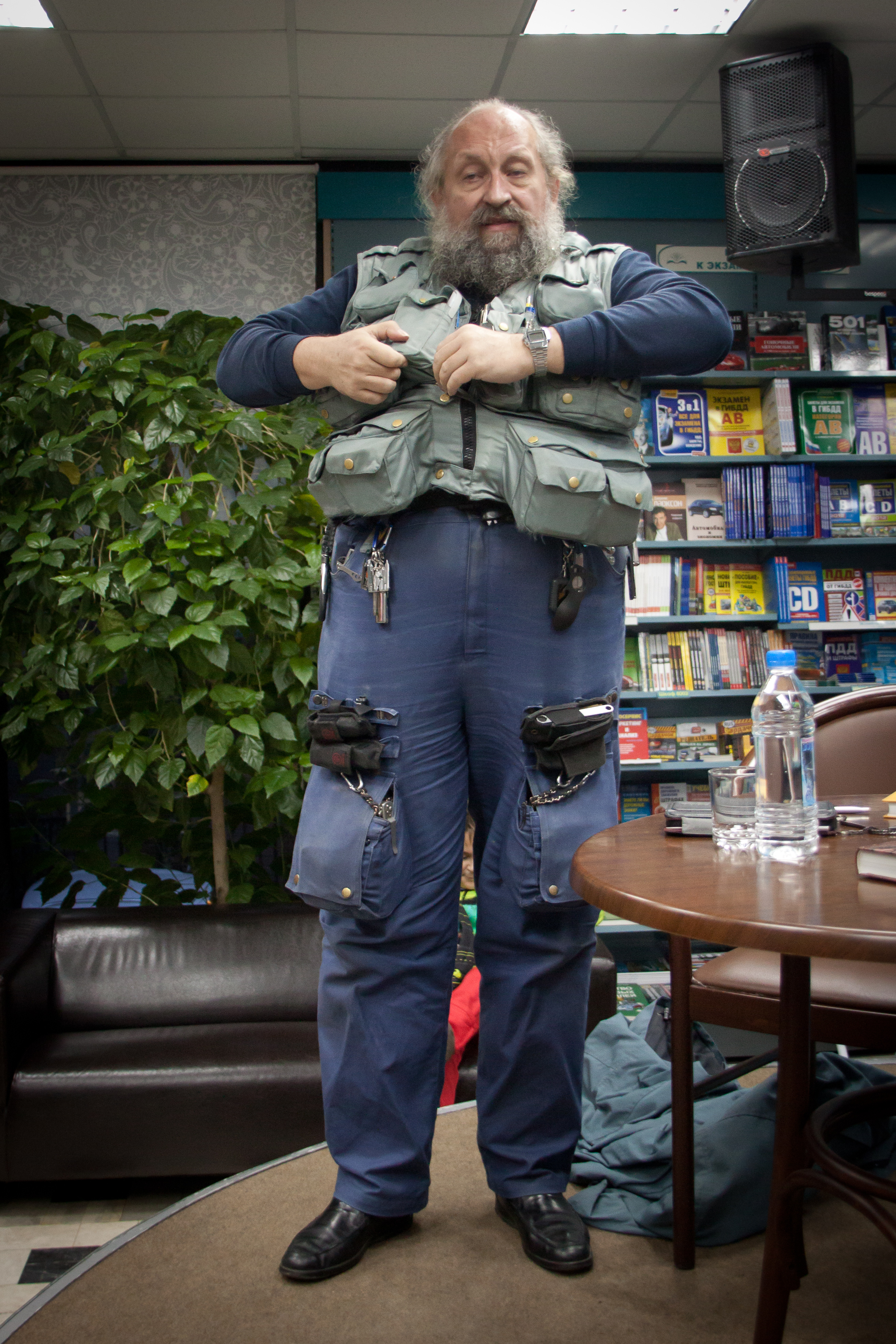
Russian pundit Anatoly Wasserman is famous of wearing his LBV during TV quiz shows

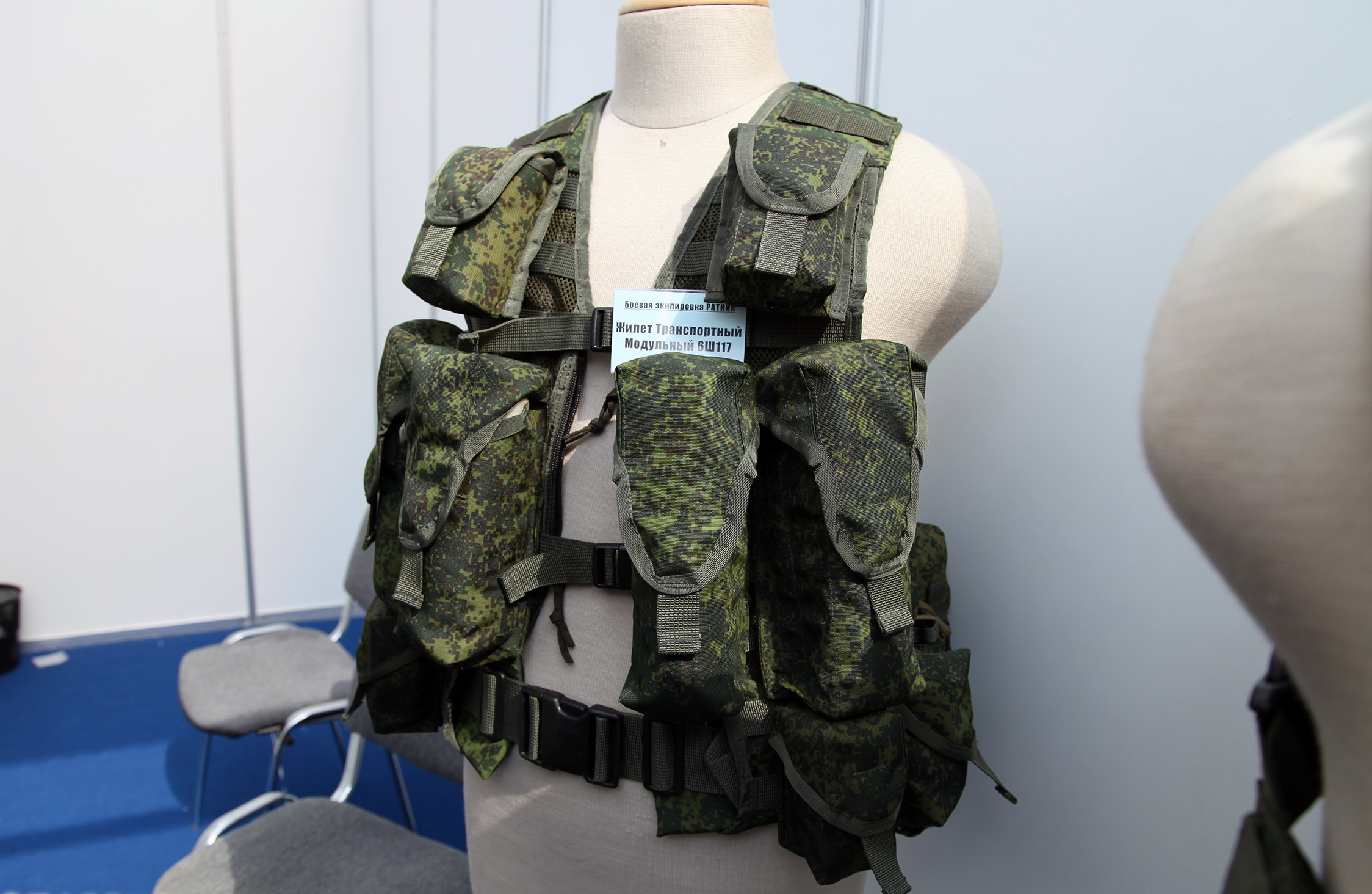
LBV from Russian ratnik gear

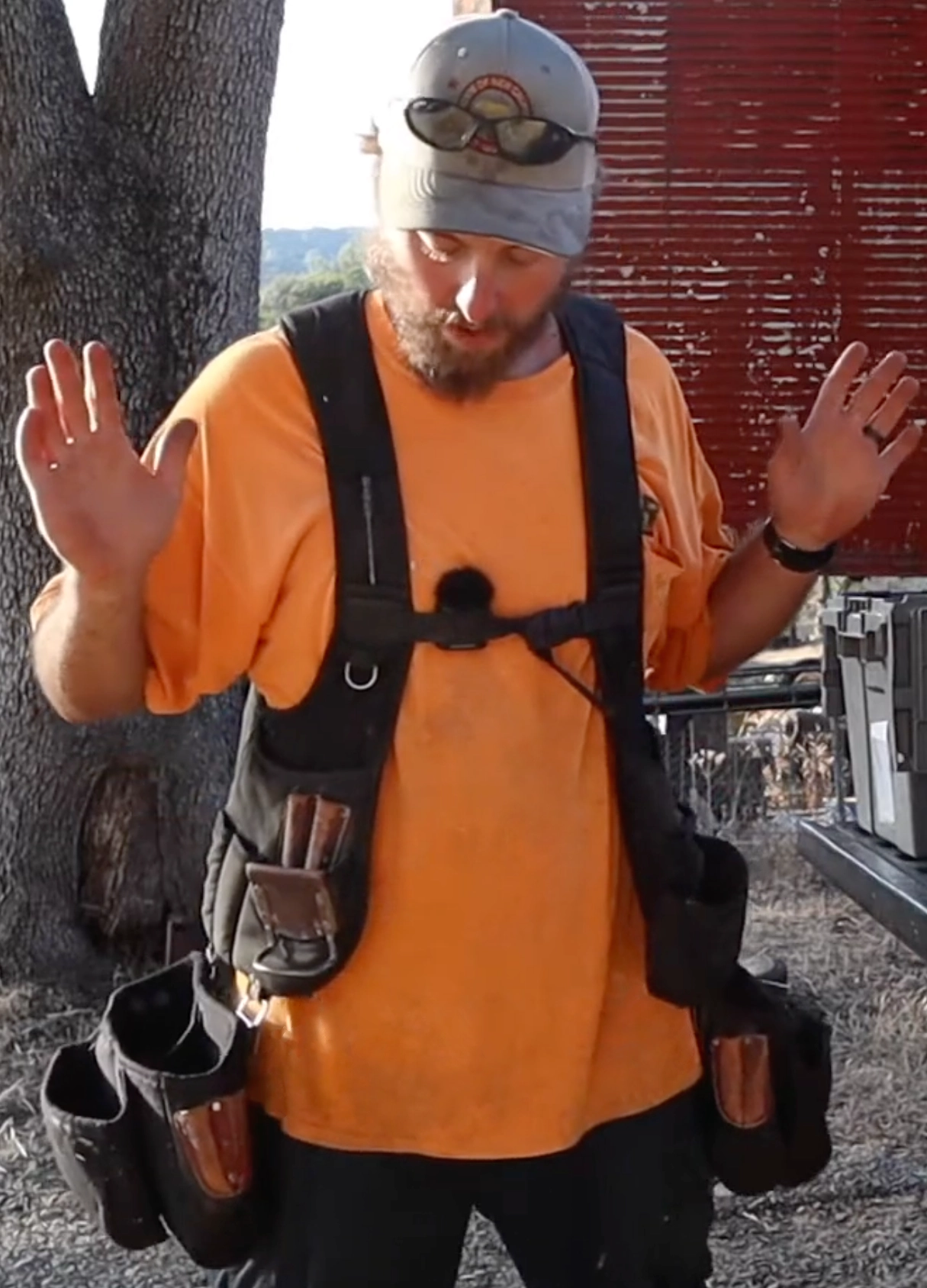
A handyman's tool vest

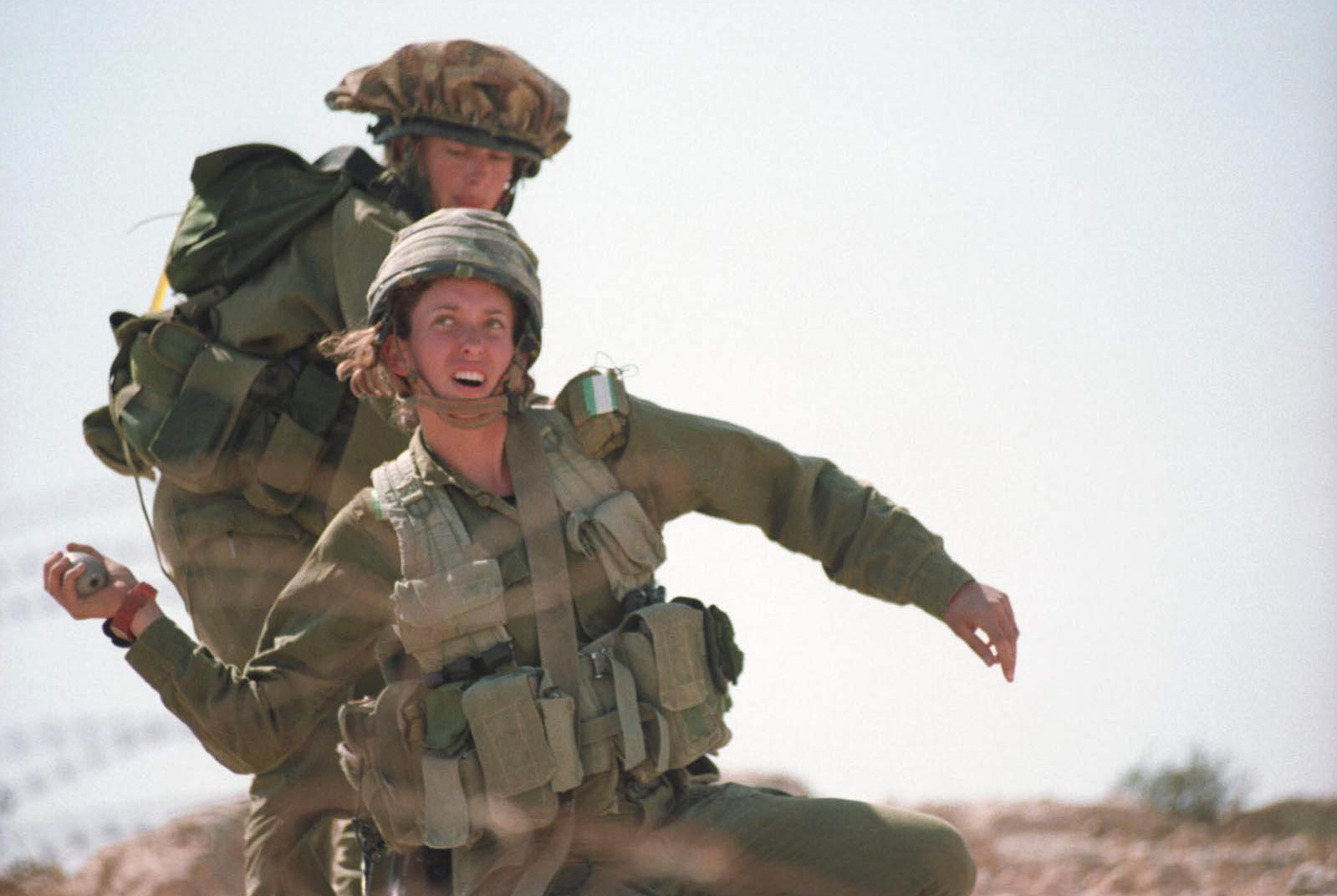
IDF Ephod Combat Vest

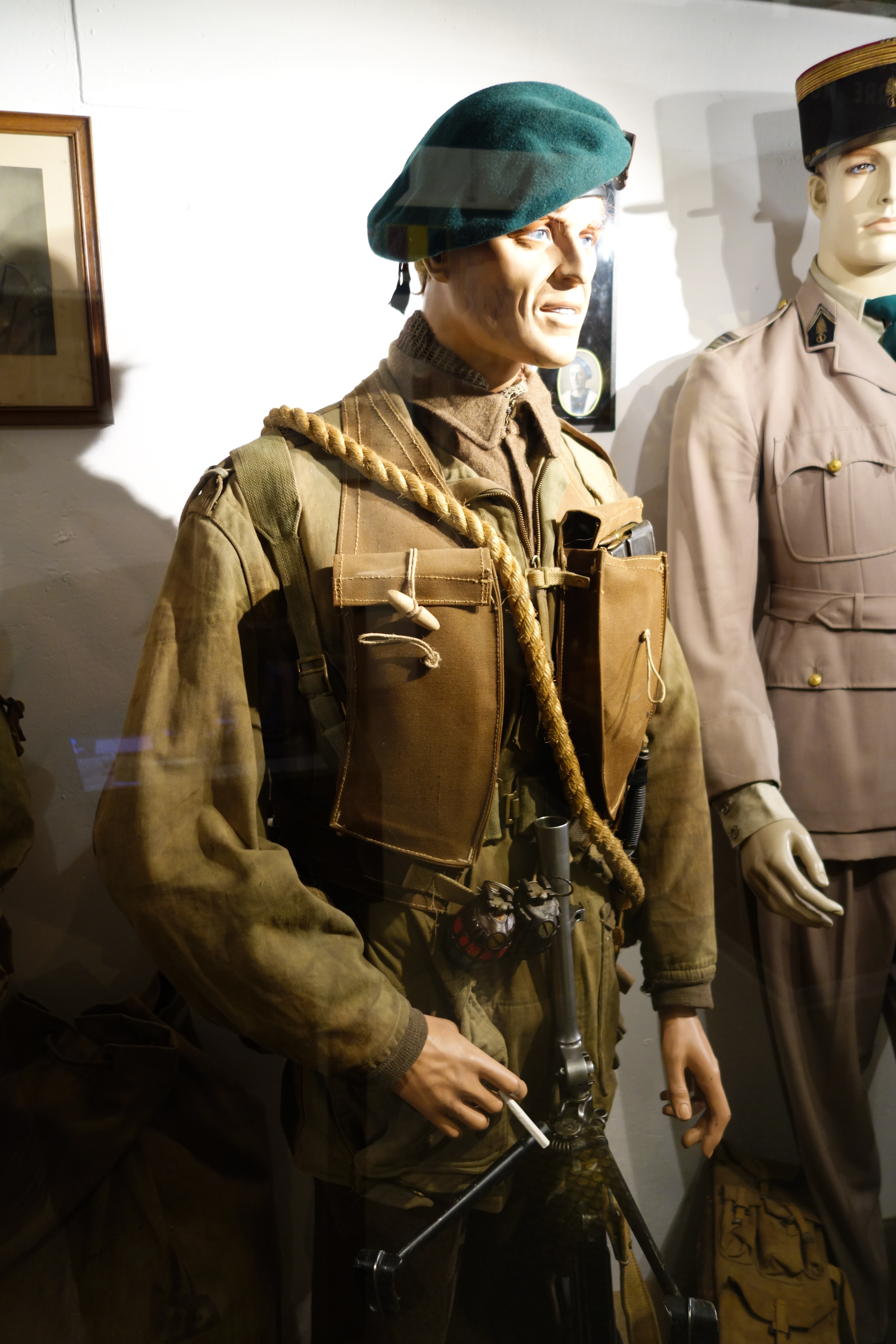
Battle Jerkin worn on the D-Day

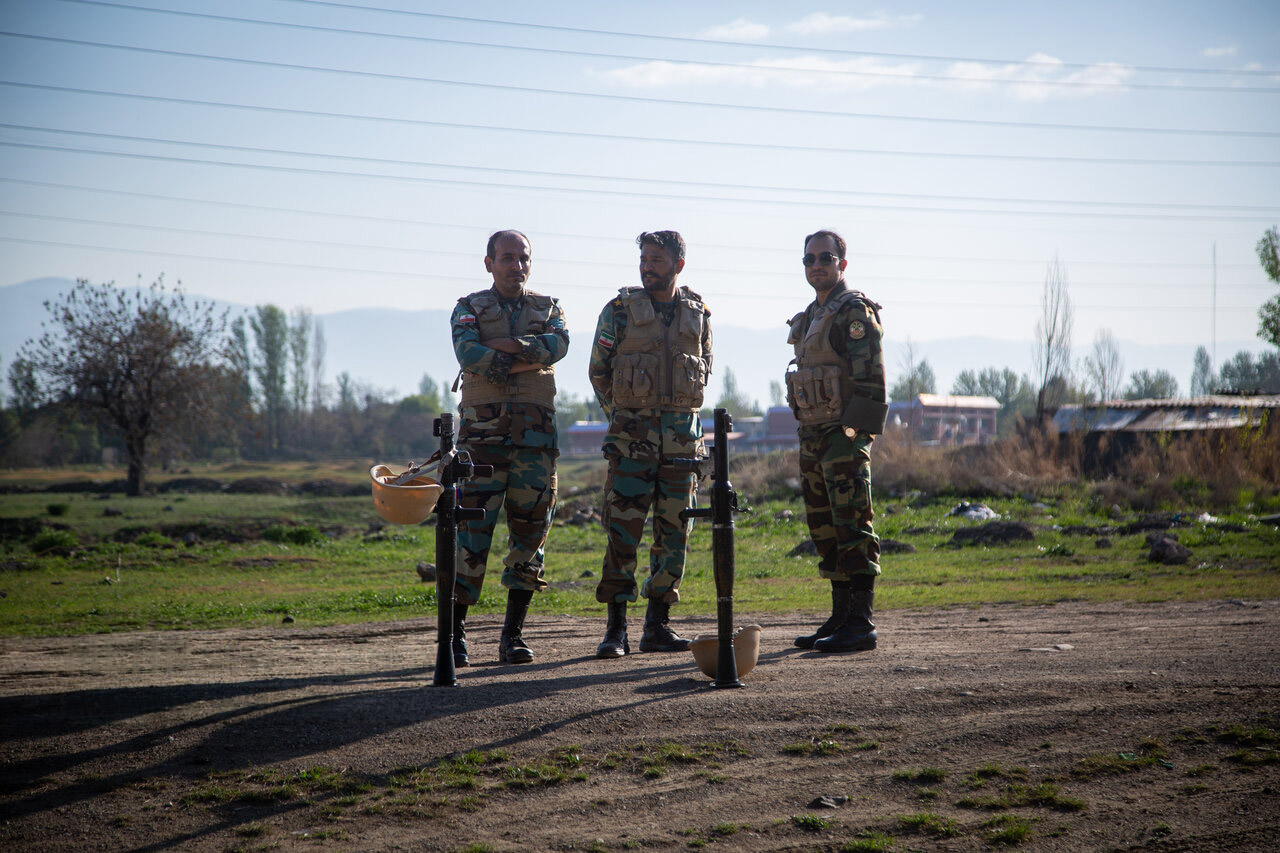
Iran military LBV

== See also ==
- List of webbing equipment
- Duty belt
