= Correaje Argentino de Cuero =

The Correaje Argentino de Cuero was a leather webbing set issued to the Argentine military during "The Process" of the military junta. The webbing was extensively used during the Falklands War alongside the Correaje Tempex.

It was made of green leather and could withstand the harsh wet conditions of the Falklands. It came with:

- Submachine gun magazine pouches holding 2 magazines each for the ML-63 and FMK-3.
- FN FAL magazine pouches holding 2 magazines each.
- Leather FN FAL bayonet frog.
- 4 point suspenders.
- Leather holster used for Browning Hi-Power/Ballester–Molina.
- Water bottle.
