= 1937 pattern web equipment =

British and Commonwealth military equipment

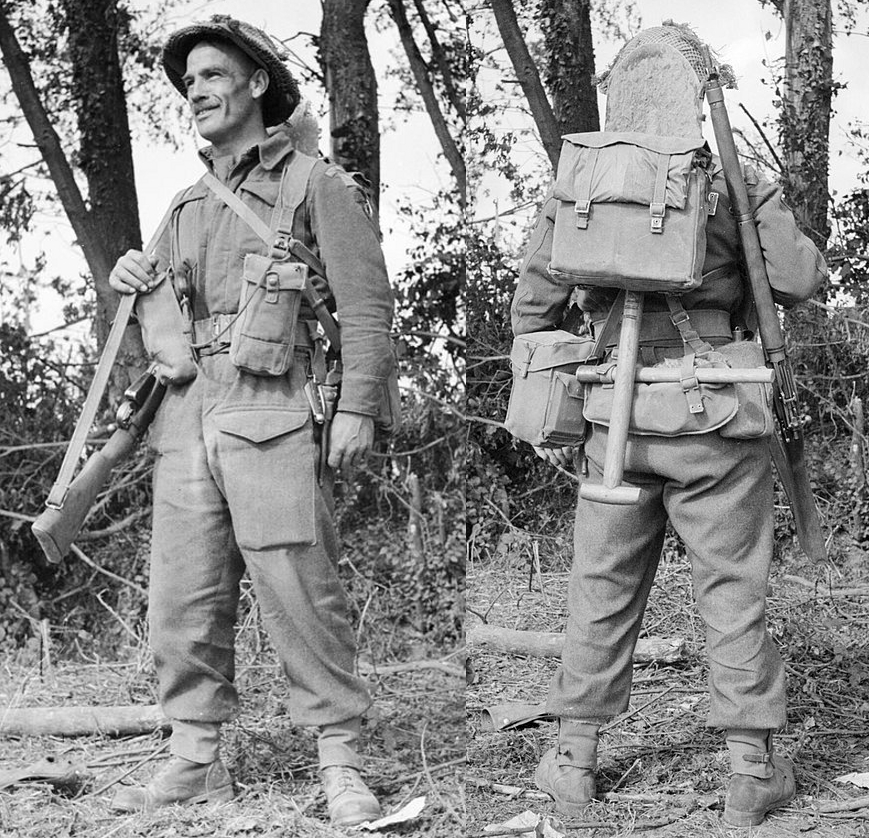
Front and rear views of a soldier of the Royal Welch Fusiliers with 1937 pattern web equipment, Normandy, August 1944

1937 pattern web equipment (also known as '37 webbing'), officially known as "Equipment, Web 1937" and "Pattern 1937 Equipment" was the British military load-carrying equipment used during the Second World War. It replaced the 1908 pattern and 1925 pattern—on which it was based—and was standard issue for British and Commonwealth troops from its introduction in 1937, throughout World War II, and in the post-war period until it was superseded by 1958 pattern web equipment. It remained in limited use with Territorial Army and other second-line troops until the mid to late 1970s. Official use of the webbing in Community Cadet Forces and the Combined Cadet Force persisted into the 1980s.

== Development ==
At the end of the First World War, huge stocks of 1908 pattern equipment remained, and the difficult financial climate meant that these remained in service with the British Army in the post-war period. In 1932, the Chief of the Imperial General Staff established the Brathwaite Committee (named after General Sir Walter Braithwaite) to look into the uniform and equipment of the infantry and to make recommendations for their improvement. The increasingly complex nature of combat and different roles that soldiers and members of the other services were being required to undertake, meant that the new design needed to be flexible, thus it was decided that it would consist of interchangeable components, which could be modified to suit the individual needs of a soldier based on his role. In 1932, the Mills Equipment Company, the prime manufacturer of the 1908 equipment, offered the Brathwaite Committee four new designs to consider. Although the committee decided on one of the designs in 1934, there were trials underway to find a successor to the Lewis gun (that resulted in the Bren light machine gun), and also abortive trials of automatic rifles including the Pedersen rifle, meant that new webbing could not be adopted until decisions had been reached on future weaponry.

The design was confirmed on 8 June 1938 and wide-scale issue began in 1939. Towards the end of World War II, some 37 Webbing was produced in jungle green for troops fighting in the Pacific Theatre, although purpose-made 44 pattern webbing was then introduced for the humid jungle conditions, being lighter in weight, quicker drying and rot-proofed. Although 44 pattern continued in use with the British Army for jungle warfare in its various post-World War II colonial conflicts, it did not replace 37 pattern in general service, which was in front-line use up until the introduction of 58 pattern. However, 37 pattern was used for second-line and support troops and was included in the army's Catalogue of Ordnance Stores and Ammunition (C.O.S.A.) in 1985, but had finally disappeared by the time of the 1991 edition.

== Description ==
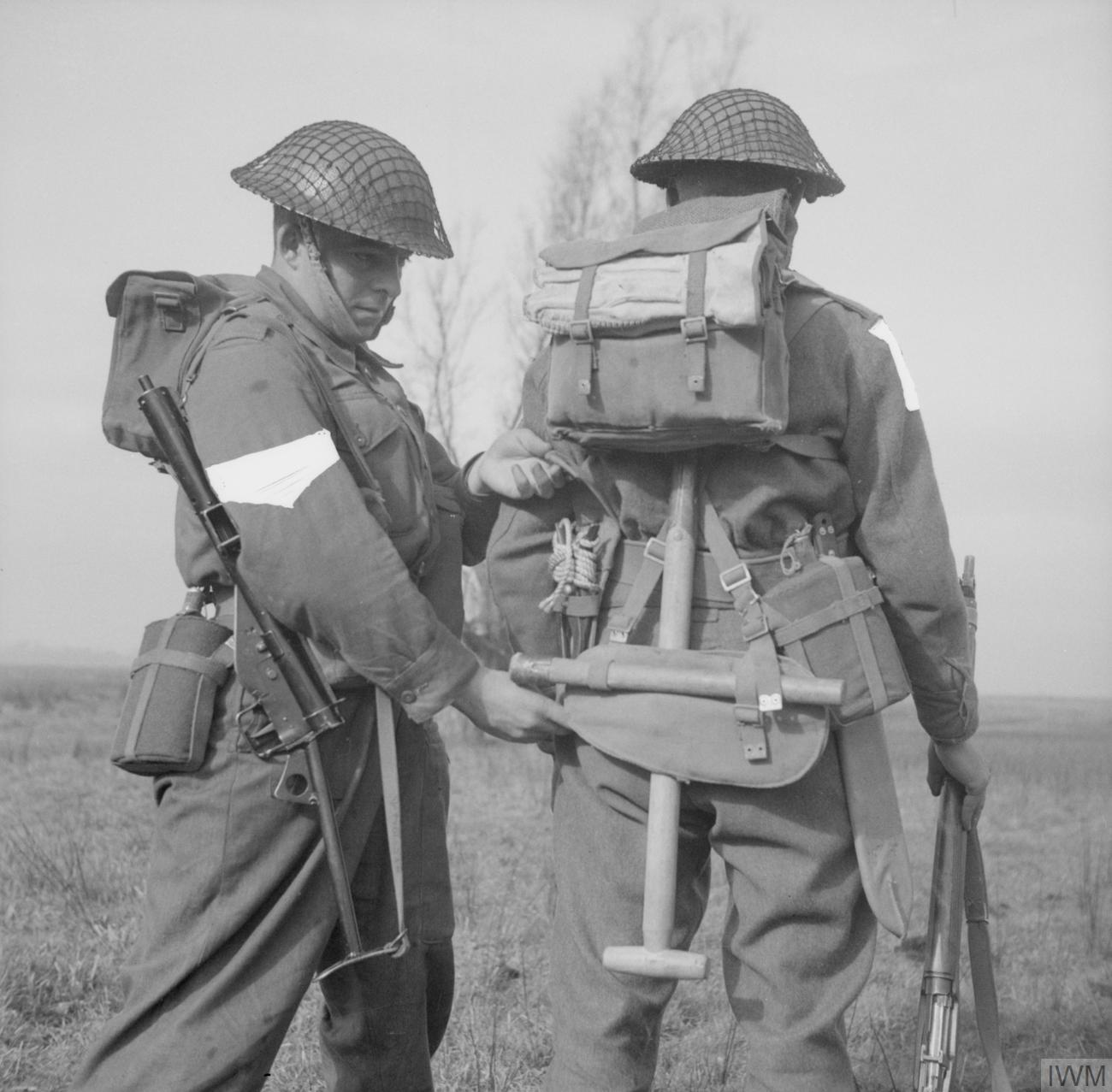
Two soldiers demonstrate 1937 pattern webbing, March 1944

1937 pattern webbing was made from cotton webbing, which was waterproofed and dyed before being woven. The fittings were made of stamped brass—blackened steel post war—and it was produced by various manufacturers. It was produced in a khaki colour for the Army, which could then be treated with Blanco, such as No. 97 Khaki Green (Medium), Pea Green (a light shade of green) or KG3 'Khaki Green (Dark)' for the army and blue-grey for the Royal Air Force. Military Police had white webbing.

Standard components included a belt (issued in sizes Normal and Large), cross straps (called 'braces'), cartridge pouches for .303 ammunition (which gave way to 'universal' pouches to carry ammunition for an array of infantry weapons then in use by the British Army, in addition to grenades), a carrier for the waterbottle and a small pack. The large (1908 pattern) pack—intended to be carried in regimental transport except when in full marching order—and entrenching tool carrier were retained from World War I issue, although the latter was initially issued in modified form before being reintroduced in 1941. Frogs for the Pattern 1907 sword bayonet used with the Rifle No.1 Mk III* SMLE and the simpler No. 4 bayonet for the No.4 Rifle bayonets were also issued. Different combinations of these components comprised the 'marching order' and the 'battle order' respectively. In addition various items were issued to be used by officers and often armoured crewmen, such as pouches for binoculars, pistol ammunition and compass (externally the same as that for pistol ammunition but with felt padding inside), as well as a 'valise' side pack and holster for the .38 Enfield No. 2 revolver (a tank crew version with leg strap also existed in two versions). The theoretical weight of the fully loaded equipment was 56 pounds (25 kg) for an infantryman in full marching order, including a rifle but not helmet or gas cape, and 42 pounds (19 kg) for an officer.

A number of items were issued which conformed to 37 pattern in their fittings and materials but were not strictly part of the set, such as a bandolier for Sten submachine gun magazines as issued to airborne troops and the spare barrel bag and parts wallet for the Bren gun.

== Components ==
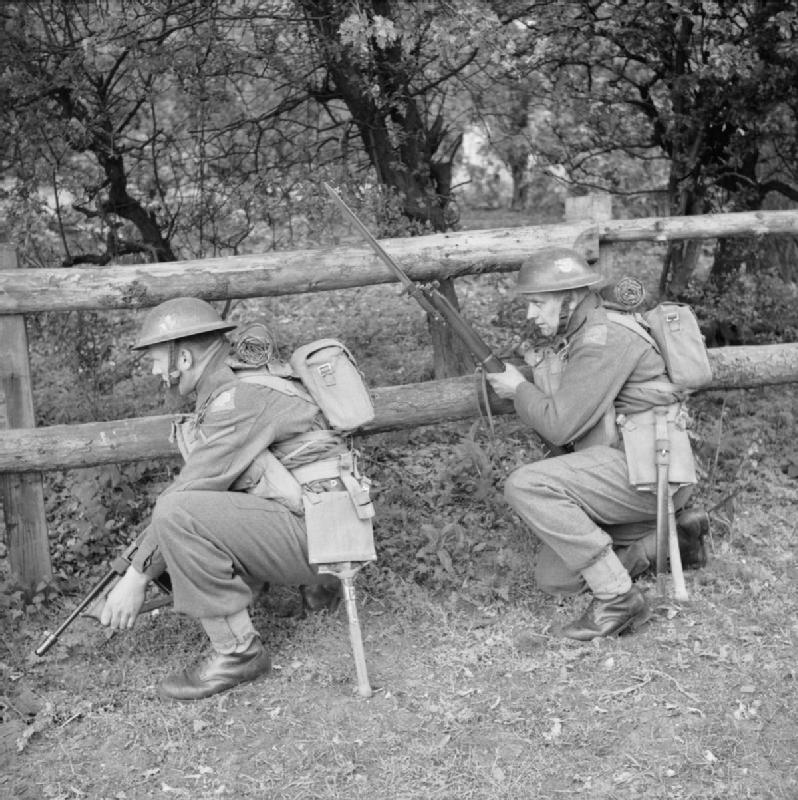
British infantry on exercise in England, 1941

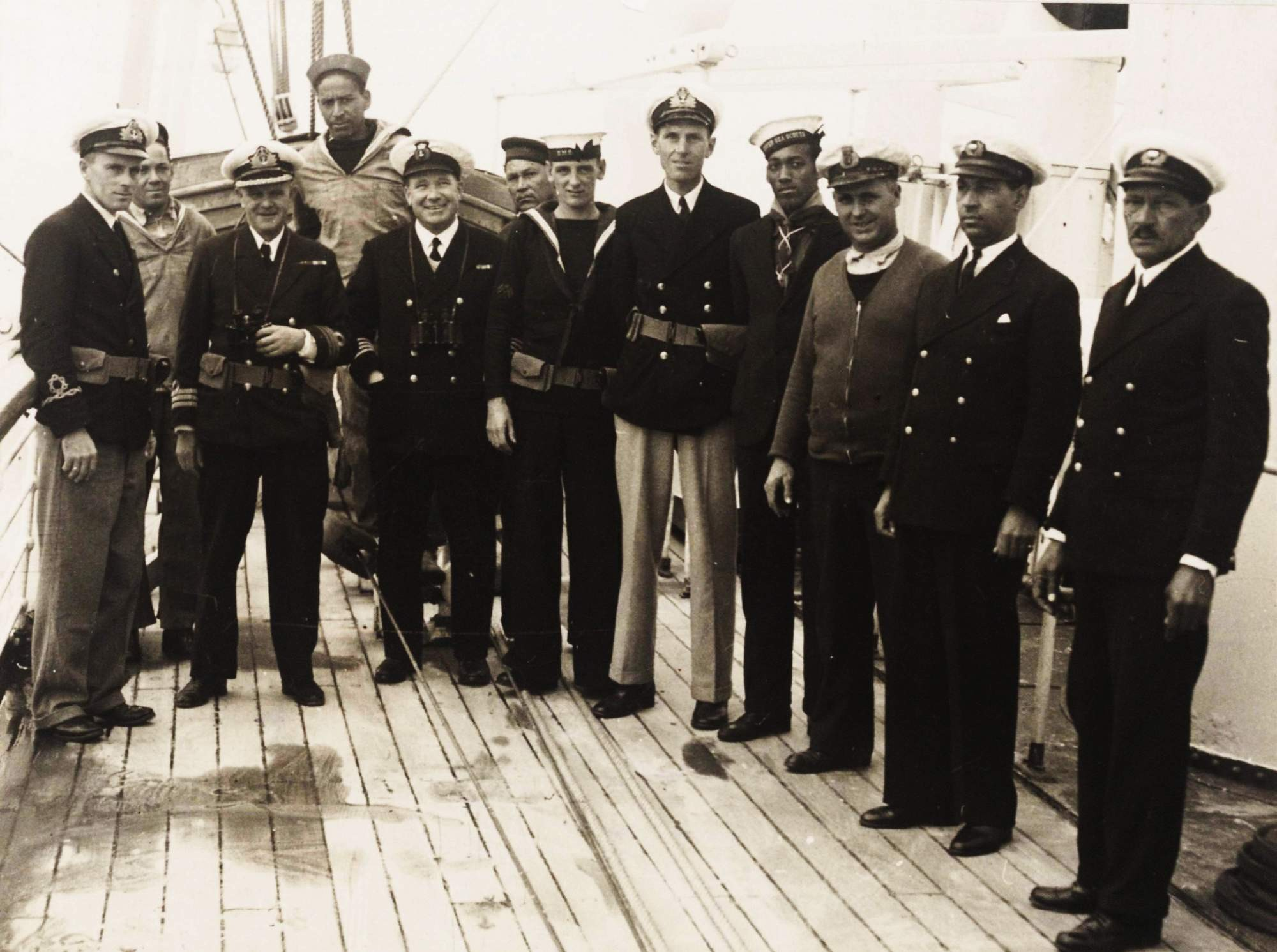
Crew of HMS Castle Harbour in the Second World War. Pistol-armed Royal Naval Examination Service personnel, wearing 1937 pattern belts and holsters, boarded and examined ships before allowing entry to Bermuda's ports.

=== Basic components ===
- Small pack (haversack): A rectangular pack that attached to the brace ends on the left hip. It was partitioned in the middle and the rear partition was split in two with two Mess Tins stored in one side containing washing and shaving kit, knife, fork and spoon and housewife (sewing kit). Spare shirt, pair of socks, pair of draws cellular and hand towel. The ground sheet/rain cape folded to cushion the back with part showing under the packs flap. It was worn on the back when the large pack was not worn.
- Binoculars case: A box that carried the binoculars pouch and binoculars. The back of the case attached to the web belt with two long oval metal hooks. The same case could also be used for carrying the iron sight for the tripod-mounted Bren gun; it came in a fitted wooden box to cushion and protect it.
- Compass pouch: A square pouch that was the same size and shape as the pistol ammunition pouch except it was felt-lined to cushion the compass. It sat above the Binoculars Case attached to the right-side shoulder strap.
- Mess tin: A new pattern of mess tin was developed for the web Equipment 1937 pattern, which was a nested, two-piece rectangular mess tin with long, folding handles. An enamelled tin mug was used for drinking hot liquids. The water bottle of the 1908 pattern web equipment was unchanged, though the web carrier was changed to incorporate the 1-inch-wide brace ends of the 1937 gear.
- Water bottle: The Mark VII water bottle was attached to the brace ends on the right hip in either a 'skeleton' or 'bucket' style webbing carrier.
- Large pack: A rectangular pack worn on the back with the Small Pack (haversack) carried on the left hip. The large pack contained the Great Coat, spare shirt, pair of socks and a pair of draws cellular.
- Basic pouches: Two pouches were carried on the belt (front), one held two Bren magazines, the other a singular spare Bren magazine and a bandolier. They were retained by the left and right shoulder straps.

Field Service Marching Order (FSMO, all equipment carried by infantrymen): This included, large pack, small pack (left side), Bren magazine pouches and water bottle.

Battle Order: Small pack, two basic pouches, a bayonet frog (left side) and water bottle (right side).

=== Holsters ===
- Pistol case: A cross-draw belt holster worn on the left hip that was designed to carry the Enfield No 2 revolver.
- Pistol case, Royal Tank Corps (1916–1939) / Royal Armoured Corps (1939–present): A straight-draw thigh holster worn on the right thigh that was used by tank commanders to carry the Enfield No 2 revolver. It had a long strap that allowed it to extend to the upper leg and a tie-down strap on the holster to secure it. It had six cartridge loops on the side of the holster to hold spare ammunition and a cleaning rod pocket along the front edge. There are pictures showing commandos wearing a cross-draw shoulder holster worn under the left armpit made from a converted version of this rig.
- Pistol case, parachute regiment: A thigh holster designed to carry the Colt 1911 automatic pistol. Similar in design to the other pistol holsters other than being longer to allow for the longer barrel and for the end of the barrel section to be leather, rather than woven.

=== Ammunition carriers ===
The system could be used to flexibly mix and match components, but regulations usually had soldiers wear set combinations.

- Grenade carrier: A horizontal rectangular case with two pouches. Each pouch could carry a No 36M "Mills bomb" fragmentation grenade. The back of the carrier slid on the web belt with two long oval metal hooks. It was designed to be worn on the side of the belt on the hip rather than the front and therefore has no shoulder strap link.
- Basic pouch: A large vertical rectangular pouch that went through three versions (Marks I, II, and III). It could carry either two Bren magazines, six 20-round Thompson sub machine gun magazines, four No 36M fragmentation, No 69 offensive, or No.77 white phosphorus grenades, four No 36M cup-discharger rifle grenades with attached gas-check baseplates, twp Smoke grenades, or boxes of small arms ammunition. The Mark I version had three cartridge loops sewn into the inner lid for carrying three ballistite rifle grenade blanks for launching rifle grenades; this feature was later omitted on the Mark II pouch. The longer basic pouch Mark III could hold five 32-round Sten machine carbine magazines.
- Pistol ammunition pouch: A small pouch that carried a rectangular box of (12) rounds of .38/200 ammunition for the Enfield No 2 revolver. It could be secured between the pistol case and the left brace.
- Cartridge carrier: A horizontal rectangular case with two square pouches that carried a total of 20 rounds (4 × 5-round clips). It was designed for use by non-infantry soldiers who carried a rifle. Each pouch contained (2) 5-round chargers that were separated by a cloth divider. The pouch had two snaps: the bottom snap was used if only one clip was carried and the top snap was used if both clips were carried. The back of the carrier attached to the web belt with two long oval metal hooks and the top had a strap that linked into the shoulder strap.
- Lanchester magazine pouch: This long rectangular pouch carried (3) 50-round magazines for the Lanchester submachine gun that was used by the Royal Marines, Royal Navy and RAF. The back of the carrier slid on the web belt with two long oval metal hooks and the top had a short strap that linked into the shoulder strap. It was so high that it went almost up to the wearer's chin.
- Vickers G.O. gun magazine pouch, alternate: This was an oval pouch designed to hold a drum for the Vickers K machine gun. It could hold a 100-round drum. The back of the carrier slid on the web belt with two long oval metal hooks and the top had a strap that linked into the shoulder strap.
- Large basic pouch (Aust): An Australian item which was wider and deeper than the normal basic pouch and therefore granted better capacity. Often referred to as "Bren" or "jungle" pouches, these were regularly used to carry linked ammunition.

=== Accessories ===
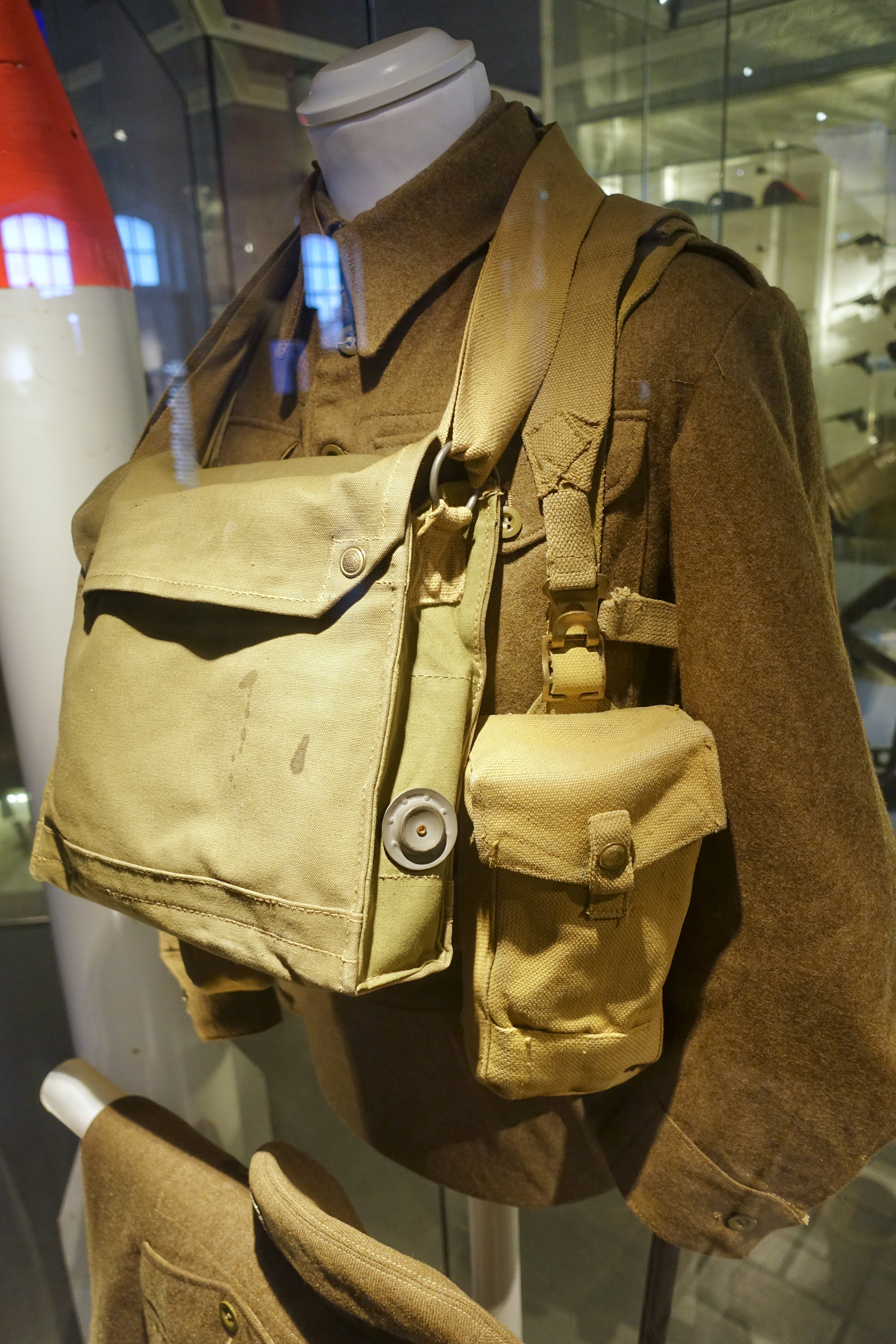
British 1937 Web Equipment used by the post-war Norwegian Army, showing the anti-gas respirator haversack Mk. VII and a utility pouch.

- Bandolier: A rectangular piece of cloth with 5 pockets and a shoulder strap. Each pocket carried (2) 5-round chargers for a total of 50 rounds. It went through 3 marks and 4 versions during the war (Marks I, II, III, and III/1).
- Utility pouch: A pair of large vertical rectangular pouches with a built-in cloth yoke and a narrow strap for securing across the chest. It was a bigger version of the basic pouch. The yoke could be worn over the neck and the pouches across the chest or worn over the shoulder with the pouches across one side. Each pouch could carry either (3) Bren gun magazines, (2) Boys Anti-Tank Rifle magazines, (3) 2-inch O.S.B. mortar shells, a Mark VII water bottle, several grenades, or boxes of small arms ammunition.
- Anti-gas respirator haversack Mks. V-VII: A large haversack to hold the general service respirator, which featured a filter on the end of a long hose attached to the face mask. Replacing the much earlier haversack Mk. I, the haversack Mk. V was intended to be worn high on the chest with full marching order, where it was secured with a cord passed around the body, or slung over the shoulder when off duty. It had an internal pocket to hold additional items of anti-gas equipment. The Mk VI haversack featured two external pockets on the back, while the Mk. VII, introduced in late 1940, simplified the design to minimise the use of metal components.

== Users ==
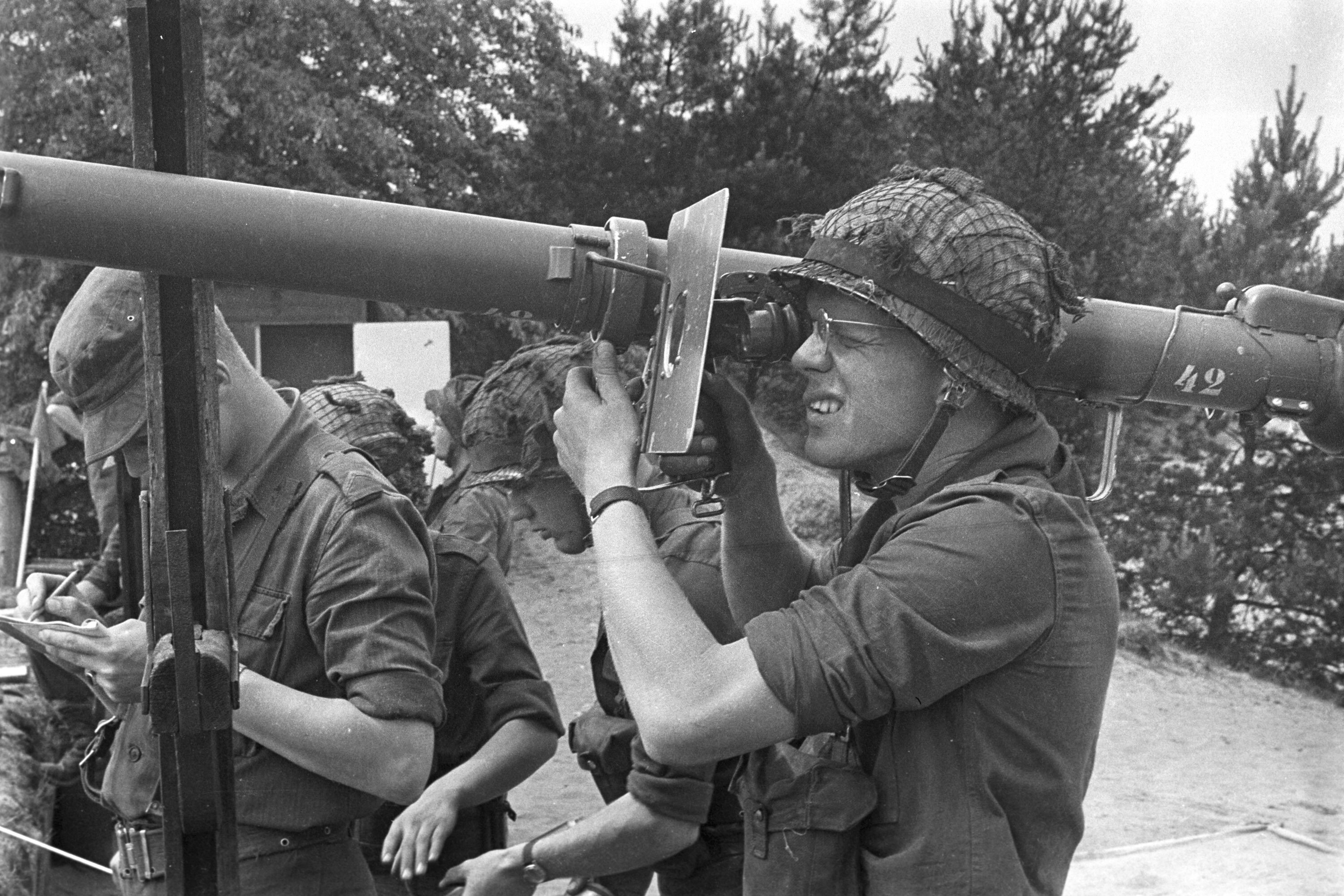
Dutch Garderegiment Grenadiers soldier in 1964; his webbing's braces and pouch are identifiable as being 1937 pattern.

- Australia: Used during World War II and thereafter. Locally manufactured webbing was used alongside imported British and Canadian webbing. The webbing's last major operational use occurred during the Vietnam War where it was reissued in response to capacity shortcomings that had been identified in M-1956 load-carrying equipment; in addition to full sets of webbing being fielded, individual components were combined with those from 1944 Pattern webbing and/or M1956 equipment and were often modified for reasons of compatibility, convenience, or both. Vietnam-era webbing was often dyed green, though undyed items remained in the supply system. Items of webbing were in use as late as 1970.
- Belgium: Free Belgian forces and post-war Belgian military; in addition to full sets of webbing being used, the brass elements were used to modify 1914 pattern leather webbing in Belgian possession.
- Canada: Used from World War II to at least the 1950s.
- Greece: Used by the British-equipped Greek Armed Forces in the Middle East during World War II and the post-war Hellenic Army, until replaced by US-pattern equipment in the 1950s–1960s.
- India: Used from World War II to at least the 1960s.
- Ireland: Used from World War II to the 1970s. The webbing continued to see ceremonial use as of 2004.
- Israel: Initially inherited from British stocks, gradually supplemented by locally manufactured versions. The design of 1937 Pattern webbing would have some influence on later Israeli webbing, and items of 1937 webbing itself could still be found in use as late as the 1960s.
- Italy: Co-Belligerent Forces.
- Netherlands: British and Australian webbing, used during World War II and thereafter.
- New Zealand: Used during World War II and thereafter. Unlike Australia, 1937 Pattern webbing was not a feature of New Zealand's equipment during the Vietnam War.
- Nigeria: Used as late as the Nigerian–Biafran War.
- United Kingdom: British Armed Forces (In service from 1938 onwards; supplemented by 1944 Pattern webbing from 1945 onwards and fully replaced by 1958 Pattern webbing from 1959 onwards, though second-line units could be found fielding it as late as the 1970s) and MOD-sponsored cadet forces (officially issued as late as the 1980s).

== See also ==
- 39 pattern webbing
