= 58 pattern webbing =

British military equipment

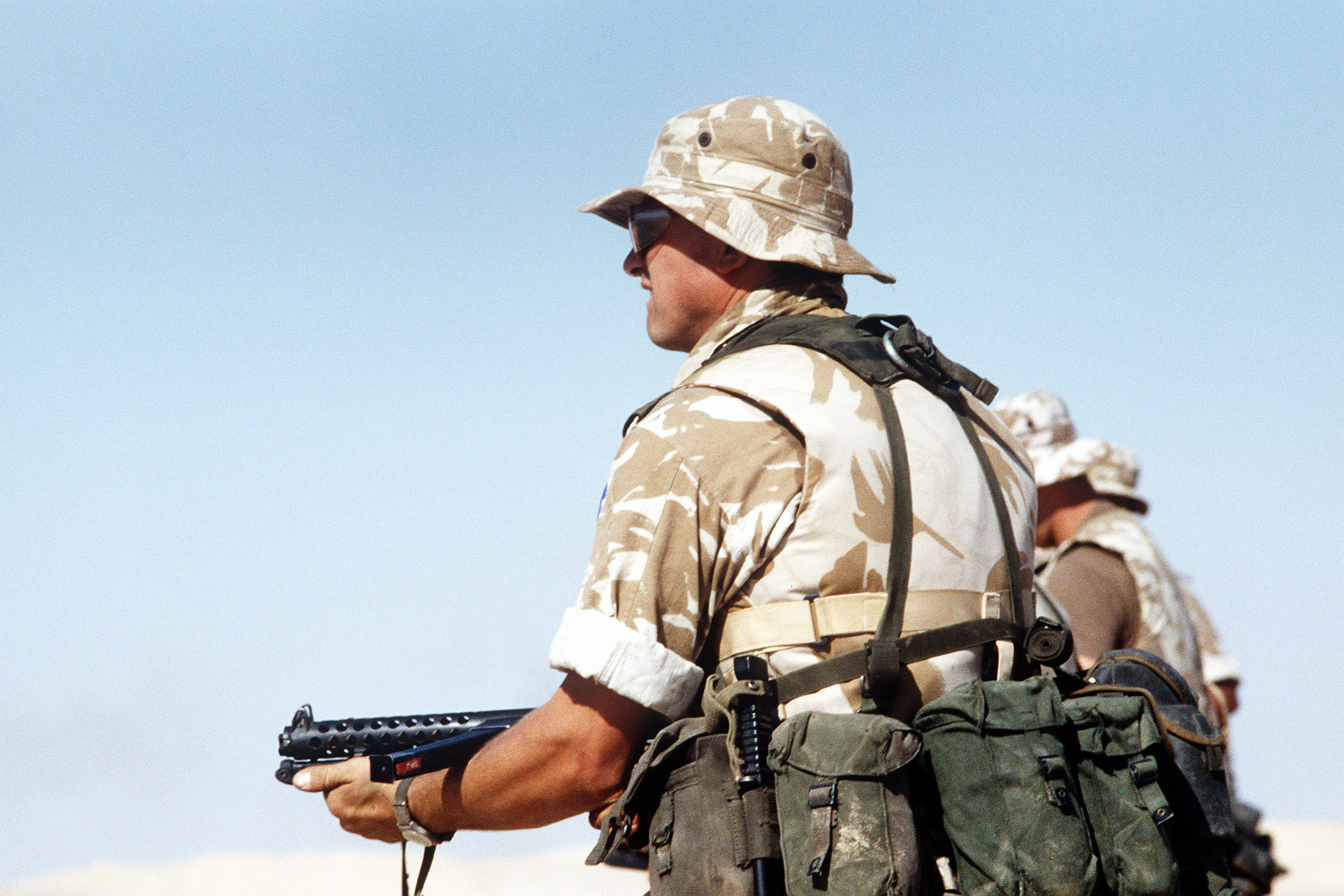
- Queen's Dragoon Guards soldier wearing 1958 web equipment in the lead-up to the Gulf War
- Type: Web Gear
- Place of origin: United Kingdom

Service history
- Used by: See Users

Production history
- Variants: See Variants

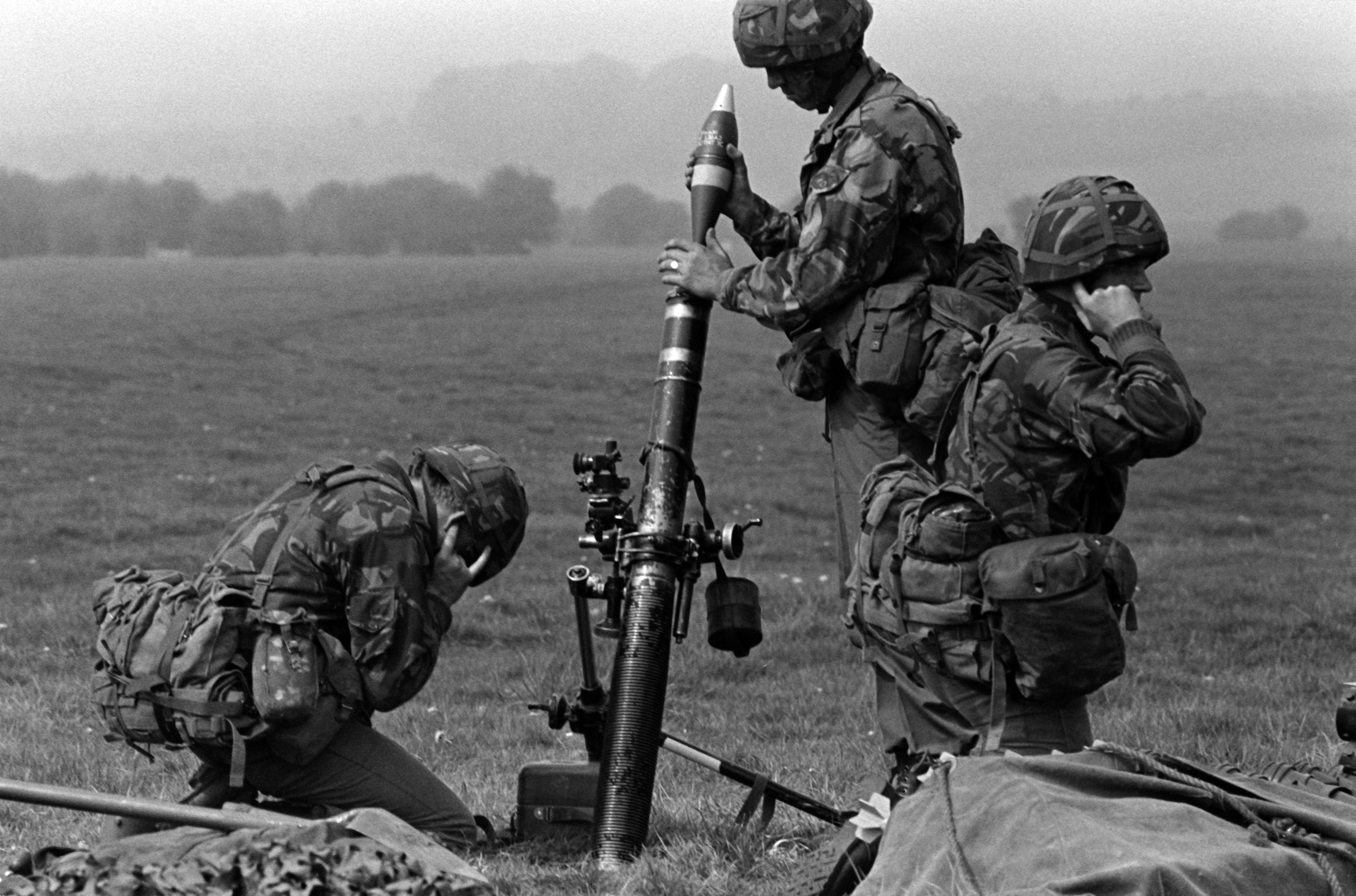
British soldiers wearing various configurations of 1958 pattern web equipment while on exercise in 1987

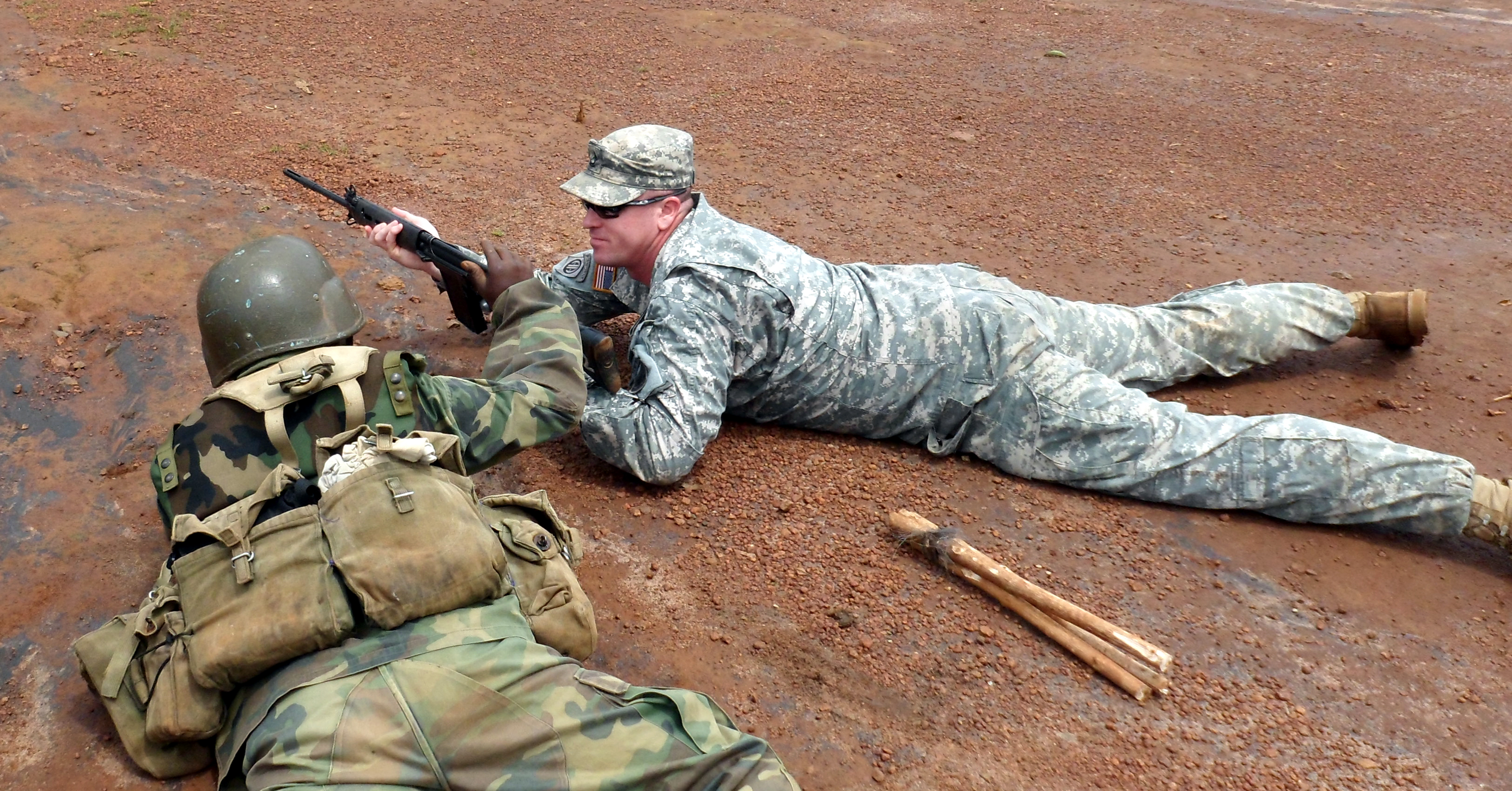
Rear pouches of a Sierra Leonean soldier's 1958 web equipment

1958 pattern web equipment was a modular personal equipment system issued to the British Armed Forces from 1959 up until the mid 90s.

== History ==
The 58 pattern webbing replaced the 1937 pattern web equipment that had served the UK's Armed Forces through the Second World War and the first decade of the Cold War and also the 1944 pattern webbing which was used in jungle conditions starting from the mid-1960s.

It was in turn gradually replaced in the 1990s by 90 and 95 pattern personal load carrying equipment (PLCE), though usage in Ministry of Defence-sponsored Community and Combined Cadet Forces persisted into the 2000s. Although replaced, the belt in particular seems to survive as an unofficial form of dress (replacing the general issue Working Belt) by older soldiers when worn with Combat Soldier 95 clothing.

== Components ==
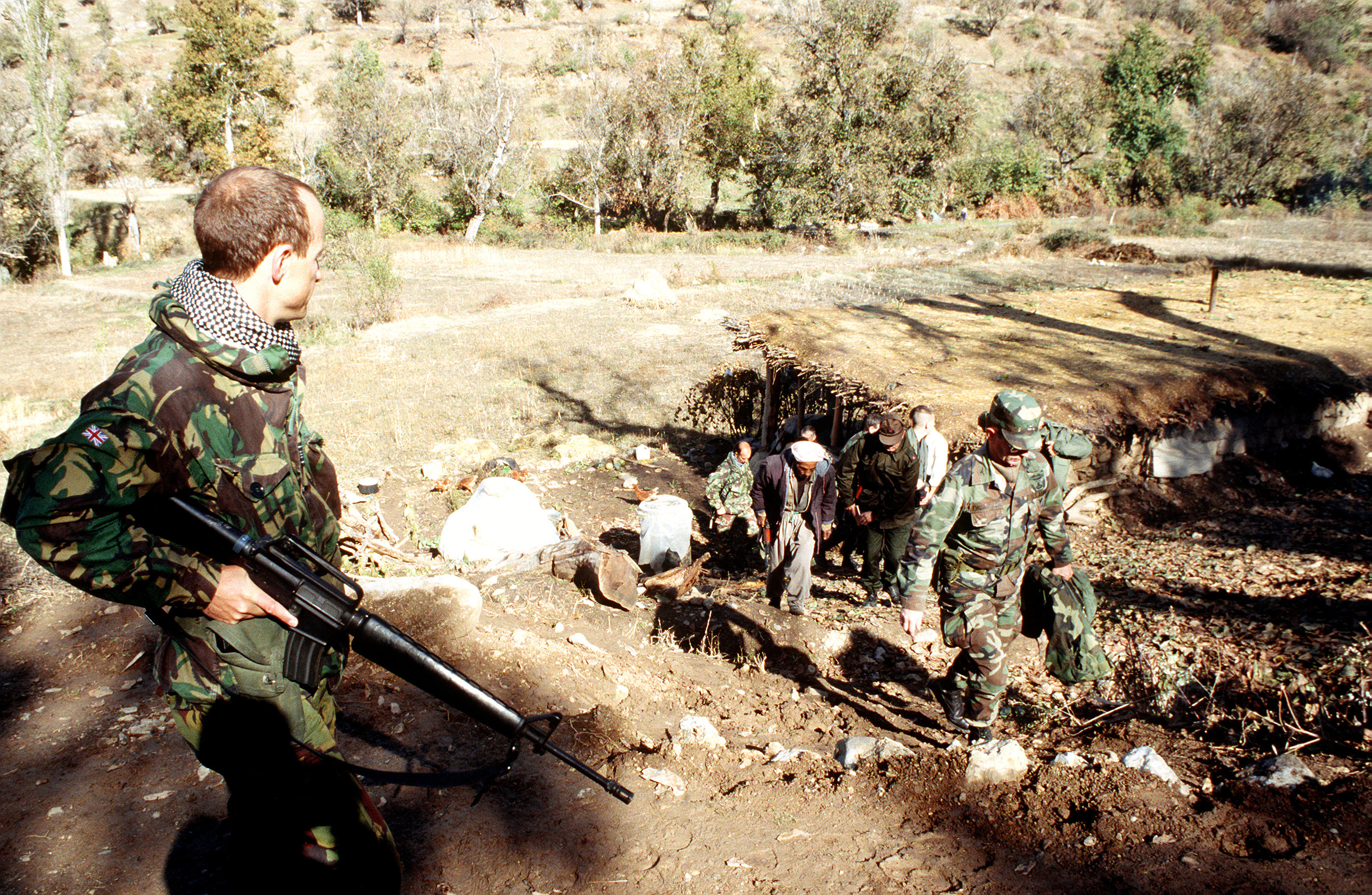
Royal Air Force officer with 1958 pattern holster

A standard set of 1958 Pattern webbing as issued to most British personnel consisted of a belt, a yoke that supported the attachment of a shovel or pick, two ammunition pouches to carry magazines for the L1A1 self-loading rifle, Sterling submachine gun, or L4A1-A9 machine gun, linked 7.62mm ammunition for the L7A1/A2 general-purpose machine gun, and/or L2A1/A2 and other grenades (with the left-hand pouch having provision for carrying a sheathed bayonet and the right-hand pouch having an external pocket to the rear for the ENERGA rifle grenade adapter), a water bottle pouch (also able to be fitted with a mug while containing the waterbottle), a pair of rear "kidney" pouches (for the storage of spare underwear and socks, washing and shaving kit, boot cleaning items, twenty-four-hour rations, and any other items that the user may need to have secured), a poncho roll or "cape carrier", and a large pack.

The standard webbing could be altered to take additional pieces of needed equipment, an example of which is the large pack having provision for externally carrying a blanket or sleeping bag and, if not worn, the Mark IV helmet.

There were a number of ancillary pouches and fittings available for soldiers carrying other armament or conducting certain roles, e.g. a holster for the L9A1 (Browning Hi-Power) and other pistols, a compass pouch, and a binocular case.

All components of the webbing equipment were made from pre-shrunk canvas webbing that was dyed in Standard Camouflage Colour (SCC) 15 Green and could be cleaned through conventional methods (as opposed to the 1908 and 1937 web equipments that used Blanco for both colouration and cleaning; fitting instructions for the 1958 equipment specifically forbade scrubbing or Blancoing of the equipment as well as any attempt to remove the finish on metal parts); the metal fittings were made from anodised dark green aluminium, again requiring less cleaning compared to the brass fittings of earlier web equipments (though said fittings were supposed to be allowed to grow dull for fieldcraft purposes anyway).

In its standard configuration, each of the belt-mounted components was secured to the belt by a pair of double hooks (one double hook only in the case of the compass pouch) at the rear, hooked over the belt above and below, with the ends of the hooks further retained in canvas pockets on the inside face of the belt. However, some sets of webbing, particularly where used by special forces, were fitted or modified with a canvas loop on the pouches into which the belt was threaded. This method of attachment allowed the pouch to be moved around the belt for the comfort of the user, for example when sitting for long periods. Some sets were also modified with quick-release buckles on the belt, pouches, or both, and could also feature pouches taken from other load-bearing systems. Most personnel used their webbing as issued, however.

A popular modification of the 58 belt is the roll-pin buckle used by British Paratroopers, who used straps from leftover RAF air-dropped cargo packs, made excellent replacements to the then standard issue 58 pattern webbing belt that often shrunk when they became wet. This trend originated in the Malayan Emergency, when the roll-pin buckle could be easily adjusted which is important on long patrols when the users could lose weight due to exertion, inadequate nutrition, and disease etc.

Several of the individual components evolved over the lifetime of the 1958 Pattern system. There were three iterations of the standard (SLR) ammunition pouches, and two of the water-bottle pouch, poncho roll and yoke.

=== Escape & Evasion (E&E) pouch ===
Other accessories are the Escape & Evasion pouch, used by Special Forces. This differs from the rest of the pouches as they use a rubberized lining. Before the introduction of E&E pouches, many were improvised from various existing pouches from both the 44 and 58 pattern webbing.

== Usage ==
The equipment was worn in a series of combinations. Weapon Training or Skeleton Order consisted of the belt, the yoke, the two ammunition pouches, and the water bottle pouch, becoming Light Fighting Order (LFO) with the addition of the rear pouches and, if desired, the cape carrier. Combat Equipment Fighting Order (CEFO) was the term used for the full webbing equipment (comprising the LFO and cape carrier with the addition of entrenching tools), and once the large pack was attached it became Combat Equipment Marching Order (CEMO).

A further informal order, effectively amounting to Skeleton Order without the yoke and with a minimal number of pouches, was often used by soldiers serving in the Aden Emergency and later Operation Banner to aid disembarkation from vehicles; soldiers who were tasked with searching vehicles at security checkpoints often carried a pistol in lieu of a rifle and thus went even further in reducing their webbing, only wearing the belt and the pistol's holster.

Over the course of its service, there were a number of developments and modifications. When the system was originally designed, little scope was given to Nuclear, Biological, and Chemical (NBC) warfare and when this was addressed, the system gained a respirator haversack to house the then issue S6 NBC Respirator.

== Variants ==
=== Nylon variant (1976 trials kit) ===
A butyl nylon variant of the 58 pattern webbing existed as trials kit designed for easy decontamination from Soviet NBC capability.

=== Foreign copies and derivatives ===
==== 61 pattern webbing ====
- 61 pattern webbing, A South African copy.
- 1970 pattern webbing, development of 61 pattern.
- 69 pattern webbing, Rhodesian copy of 61 pattern.

==== UTV webbing ====
- UTV webbing, East German equivalent made of nylon/rain camo

== Users ==
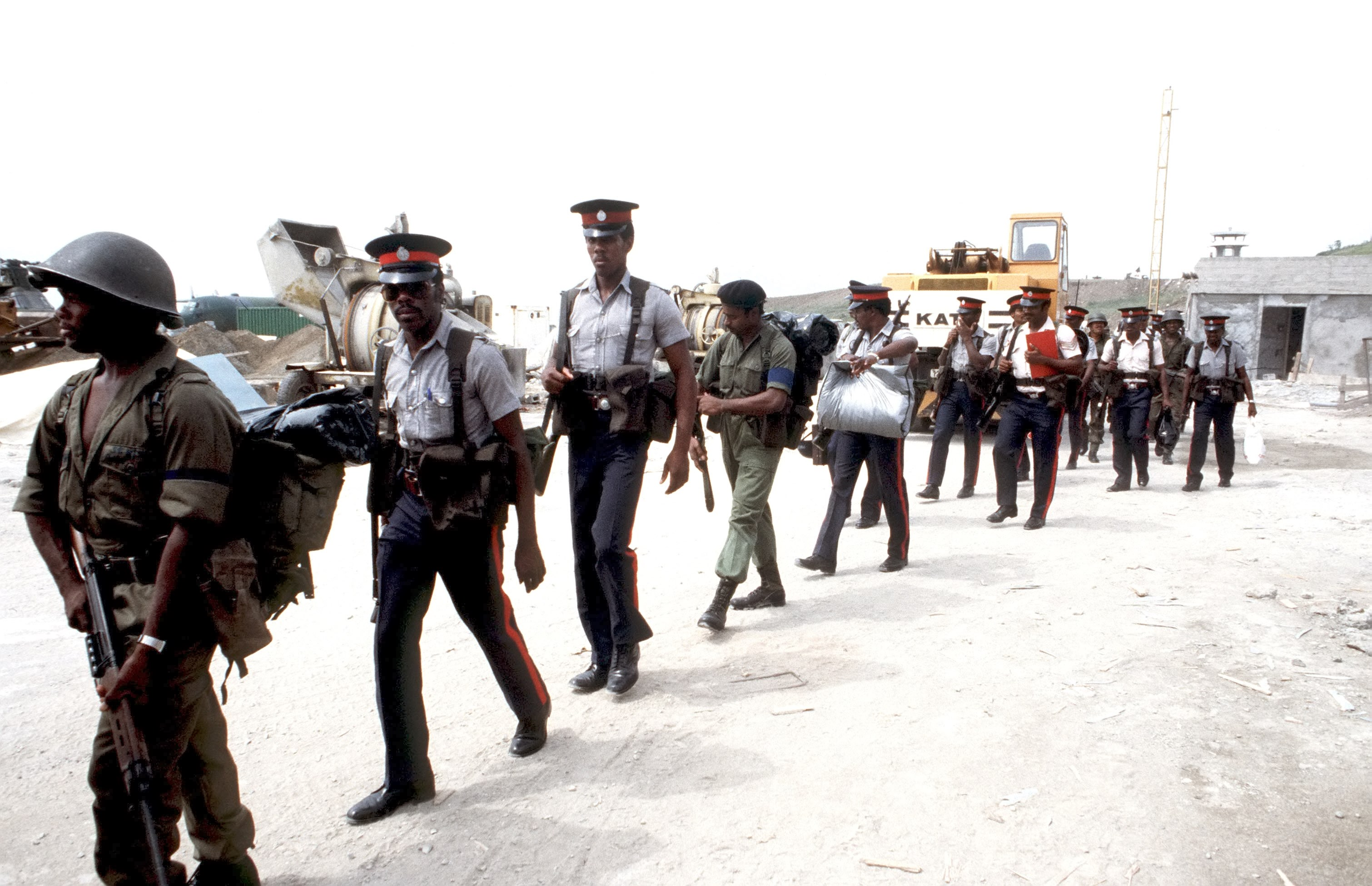
Caribbean Peace Force personnel from various contingents wearing 1958 web equipment

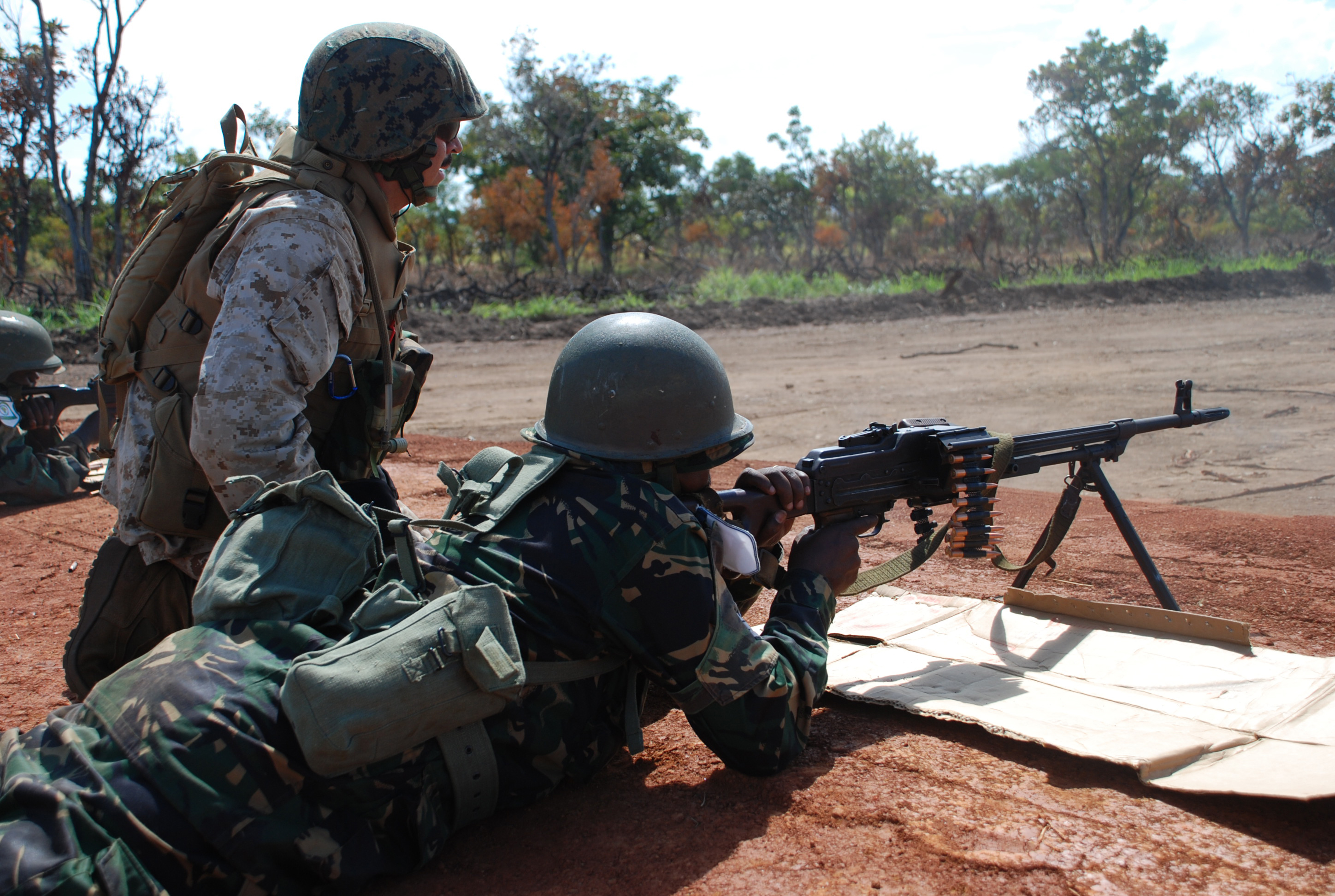
Kenyan soldier wearing 1958 web equipment during a 2009 exercise

- Barbados: Primarily used by the Defence Force, also used by the Royal Barbados Police Force contingent of the Caribbean Peace Force
- Iraq: Used during Ba'athist rule, primarily imported from Pakistan
- Ireland: Imported from Great Britain; replaced by PLCE webbing by the early 2000s
- Jamaica
- Kenya
- Kuwait
- Nigeria
- Pakistan: Domestically produced
- Sierra Leone
- United Kingdom: British Armed Forces (replaced by PLCE in the 1990s) and MOD-sponsored cadet forces (also replaced by PLCE, albeit at a slower rate than the Armed Forces)
