= Indonesian military ranks =

The Indonesian National Armed Forces (TNI) use a unified ranking system across the Army, Navy, and Air Force, with most insignia standardized. The Marine Corps, although part of the Navy, is an exception: it uses Army-style rank titles while retaining Navy-style insignia, with blue replacing red for enlisted personnel.

Flag officers hold branch-specific titles, such as Jenderal in the Army, Laksamana in the Navy, and Marsekal in the Air Force. Junior and middle-ranking officers use common titles (e.g., Kolonel, Mayor, Kapten) but add a corps abbreviation. For example, an Army colonel in the Infantry branch is styled Kolonel INF, a Navy colonel in the Supply Corps is styled Kolonel Laut (S), and an Air Force colonel in the Electronics Corps is styled Kolonel (Lek). Enlisted personnel share the same titles in the Army, Air Force, and Marine Corps, where the junior enlisted ranks are styled Prajurit. In the Navy, the equivalent junior enlisted ranks are styled Kelasi, and Navy enlisted personnel use corps abbreviations after their titles.

Insignia follow a standardized system: flag officers wear stars, middle-ranking officers use jasmine buds, and junior officers use bars. Senior NCOs use wavy bars, NCOs use yellow chevrons, senior enlisted personnel wear red chevrons (blue in the Navy and Marine Corps), and junior enlisted personnel wear red bars (blue in the Navy and Marine Corps).

== Current military ranks ==
All branches of the armed forces maintain the same rank insignia, with minor color difference in insignia background. Since, all services have at least three type of uniform (Service dress uniform (Pakaian Dinas Harian / PDH), Full dress uniform (Pakaian Dinas Upacara / PDU), and Field uniform (Pakaian Dinas Lapangan / PDL)), there are three different insignia style corresponding to type of uniform. Aside from type of the uniform above, The Navy has uniform for wear in overseas service, officially known as Black Navy. When wearing such uniform, officers wear their ranks as gold stripes on their lower sleeves. The number and width of the stripes for each rank is similar to that of the United States Navy.

Command and Staff rank
An example of a Second lieutenant rank (left) with red piping indicating a command rank. While (right) without red piping indicating a staff rank.

The rank insignia for same services are also differentiated by red piping (command) or no piping (staff) at the sides of the boards.

Note: Indonesia is not a member of NATO, so there is no official equivalence between the Indonesian military ranks and those defined by NATO. The displayed parallel is approximate and for illustration purposes only.

=== Commissioned officers ===
The following are the rank insignia for commissioned officers for the army, navy and air force respectively.

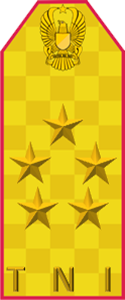
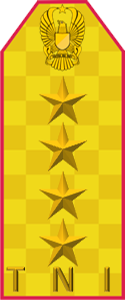
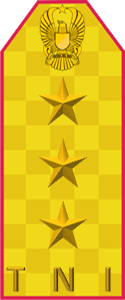
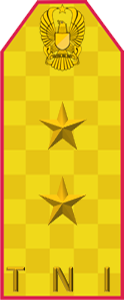
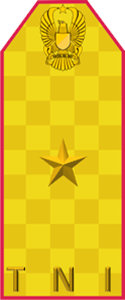
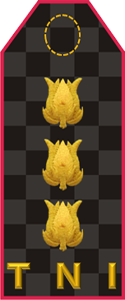
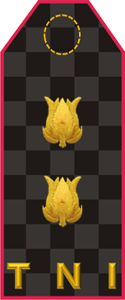
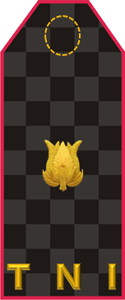
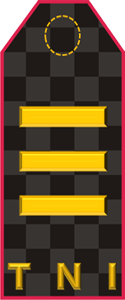
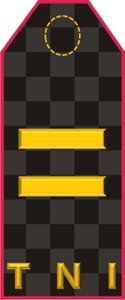
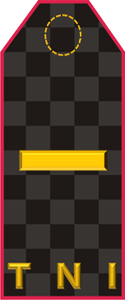
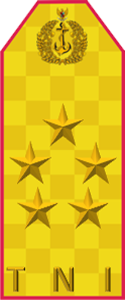
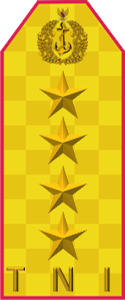
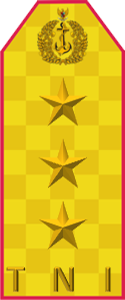
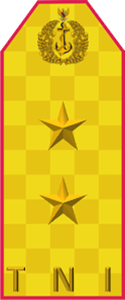
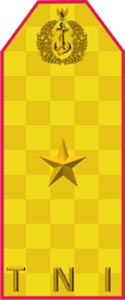
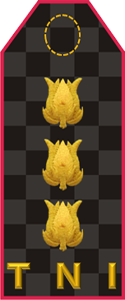
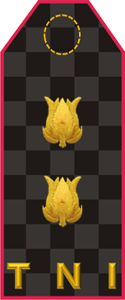
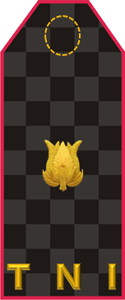
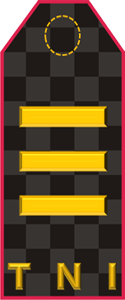
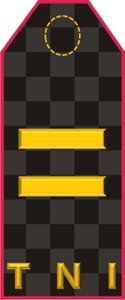
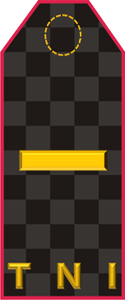
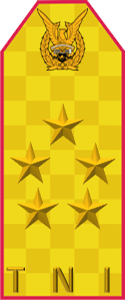
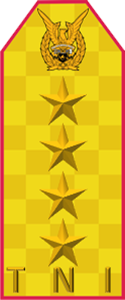
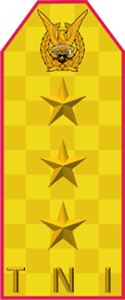
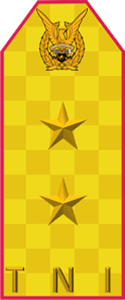
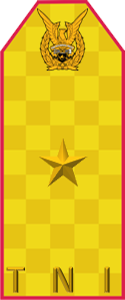
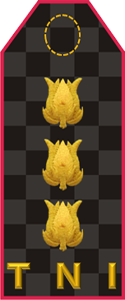
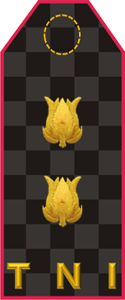
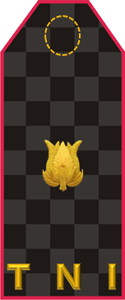
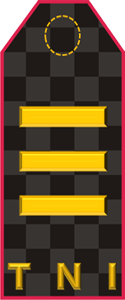
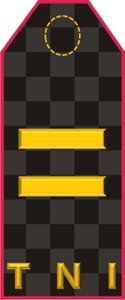
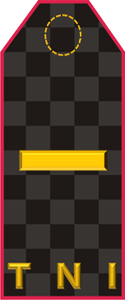
Rank group	General / flag officers					Senior officers			Junior officers
Indonesian Army
Indonesian Army	Jenderal besar	Jenderal	Letnan jenderal	Mayor jenderal	Brigadir jenderal	Kolonel	Letnan kolonel	Mayor	Kapten	Letnan satu	Letnan dua
Army rank insginia on PDU
Army rank insginia on PDL
Indonesian Navy
Indonesian Navy	Laksamana besar	Laksamana	Laksamana madya	Laksamana muda	Laksamana pertama	Kolonel	Letnan kolonel	Mayor	Kapten	Letnan satu	Letnan dua
Navy rank insginia on PDU
Navy rank insginia on PDL
Navy sleeve rank on Black Navy uniform	No insignia
Indonesian Air Force
Indonesian Air Force	Marsekal besar	Marsekal	Marsekal madya	Marsekal muda	Marsekal pertama	Kolonel	Letnan kolonel	Mayor	Kapten	Letnan satu	Letnan dua
Air Force rank insginia on PDU
Air Force rank insginia on PDL
Rank group	General / flag officers					Senior officers			Junior officers

=== Enlisted personnel ===
The rank insignia for enlisted personnel for the army, navy and air force respectively.

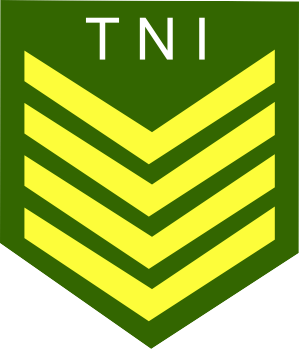
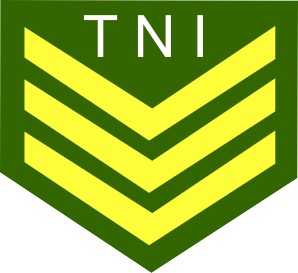
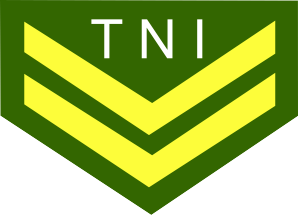
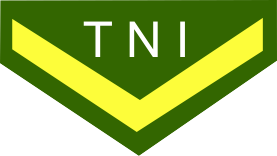
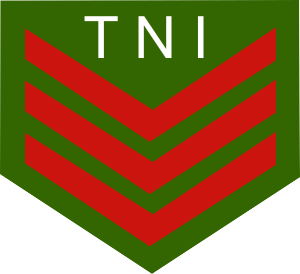
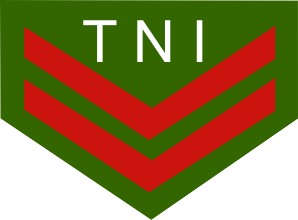
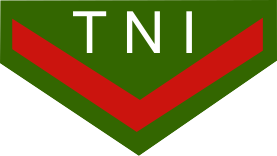
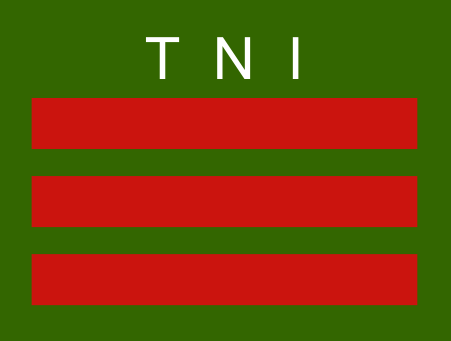
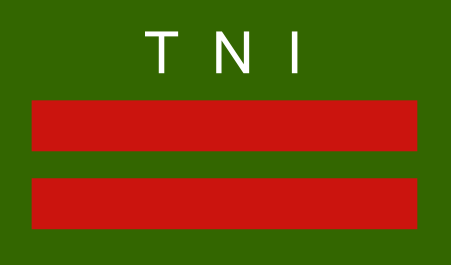
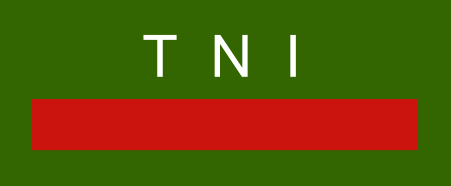
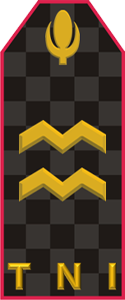
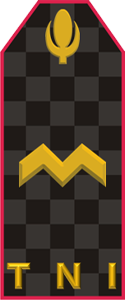
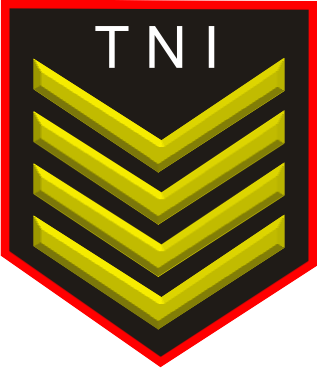
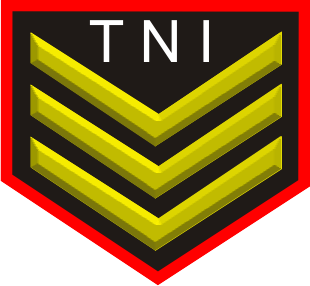
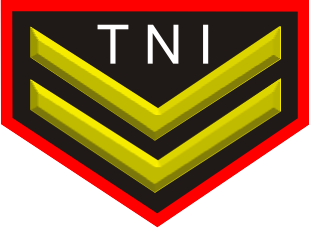
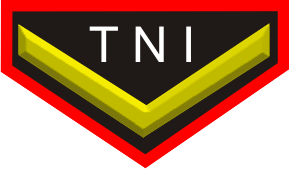
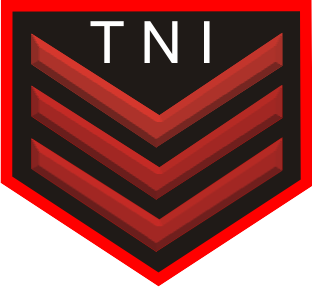
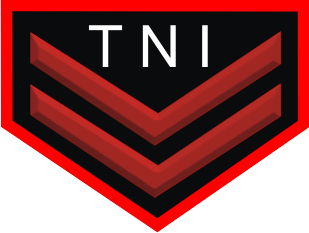
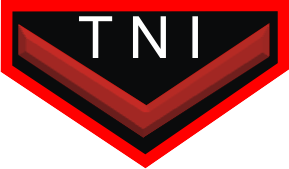
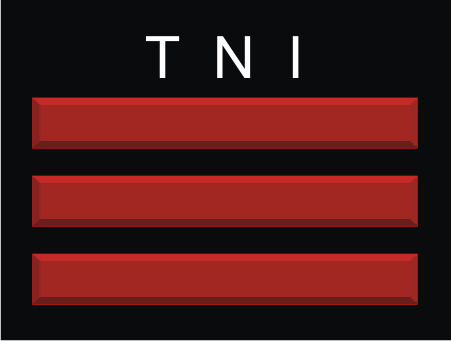
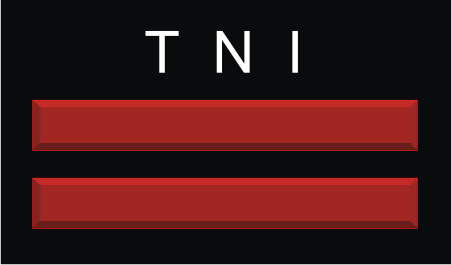
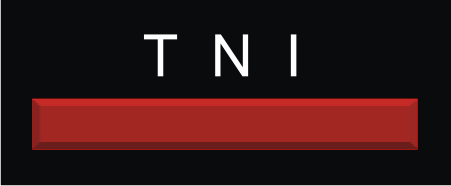
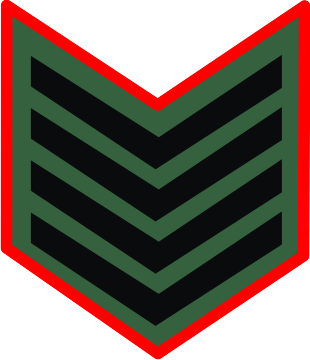
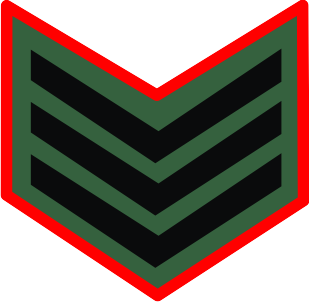
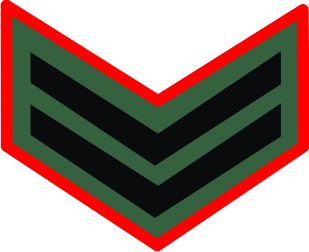
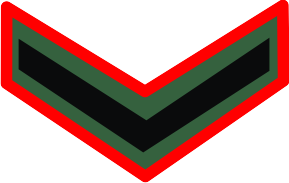
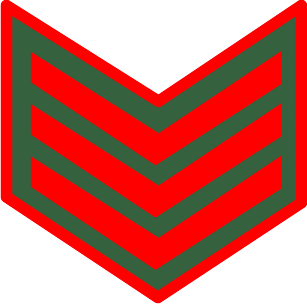
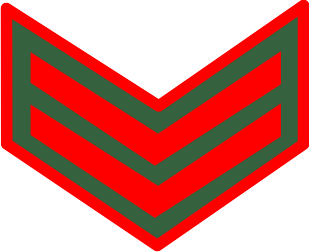
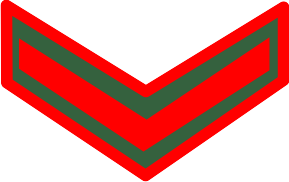
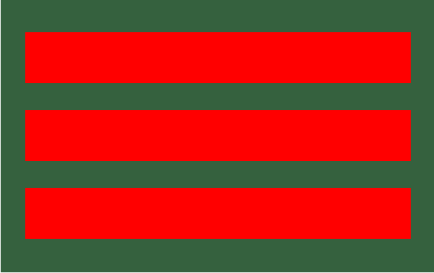
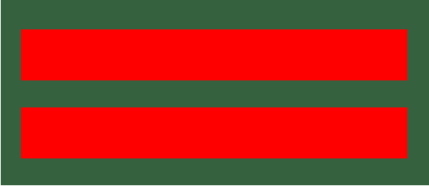
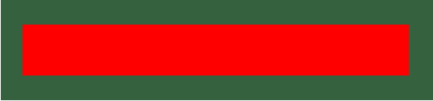
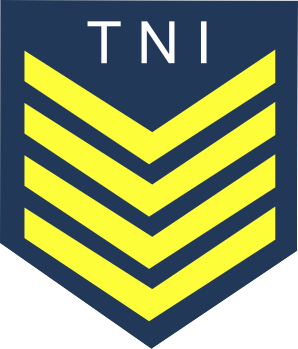
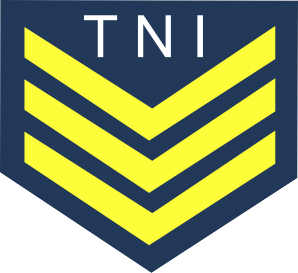
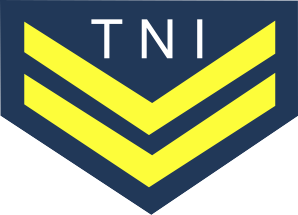
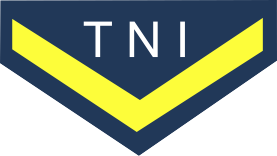
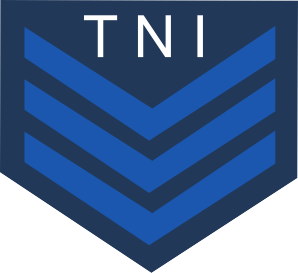
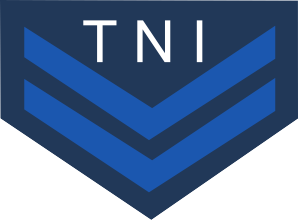
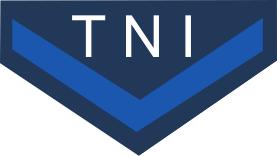
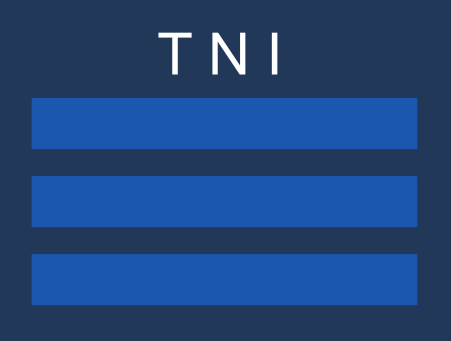
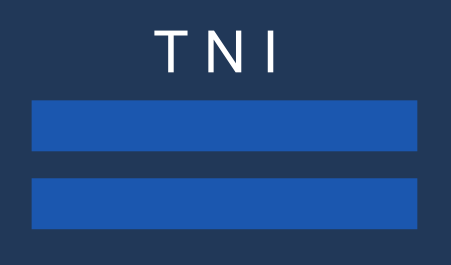
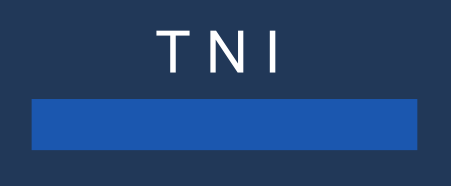
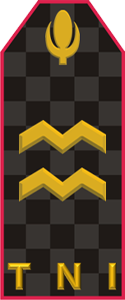
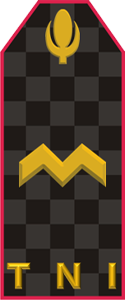
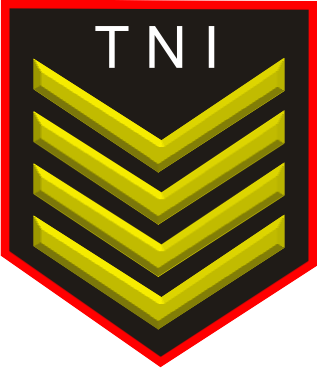
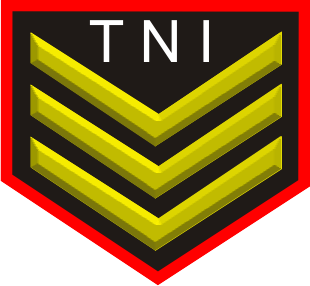
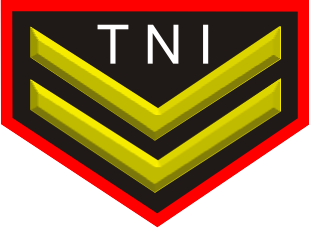
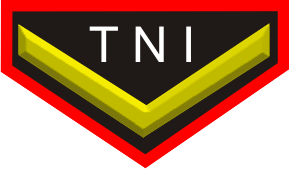
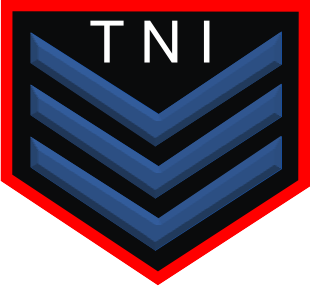
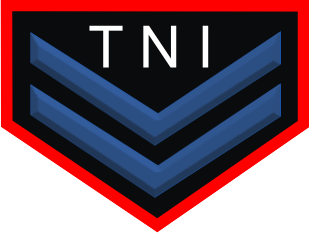
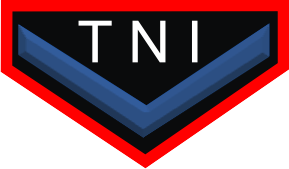
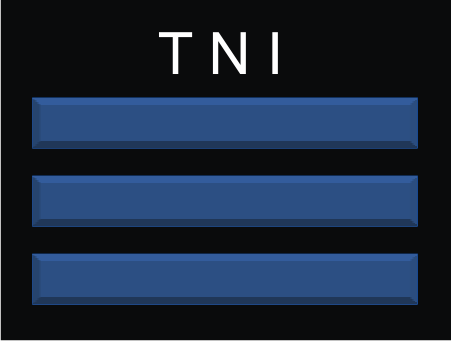
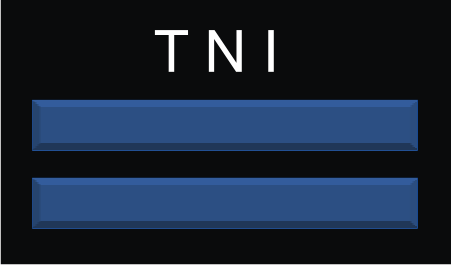
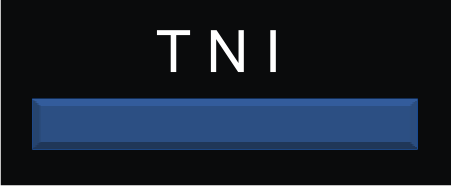
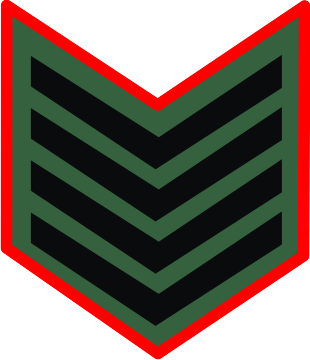
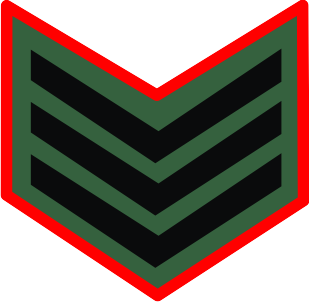
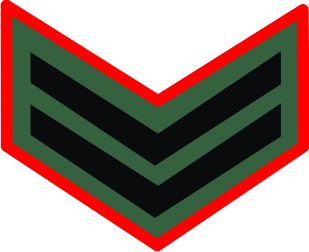
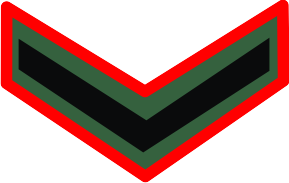
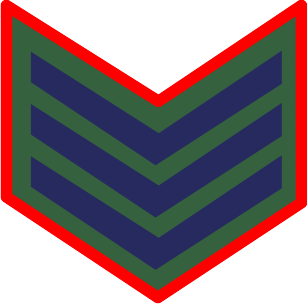
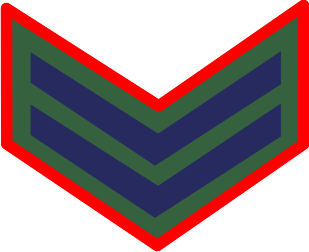
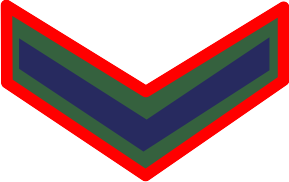
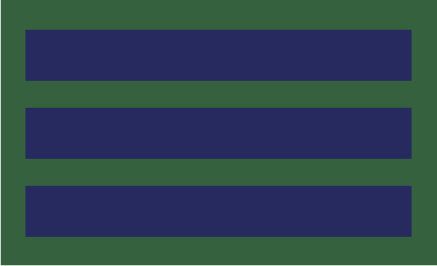
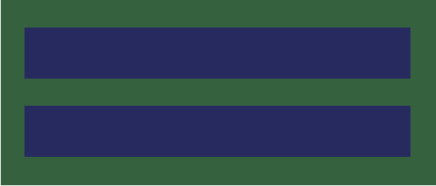
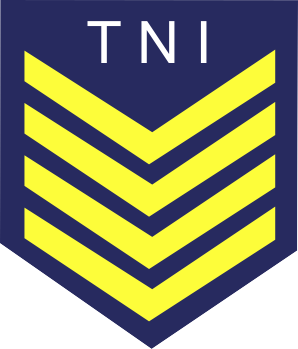
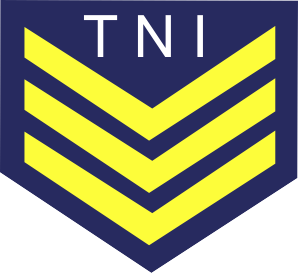
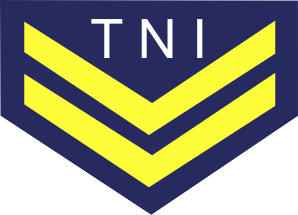
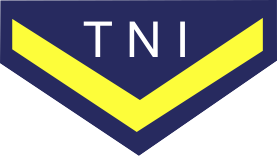
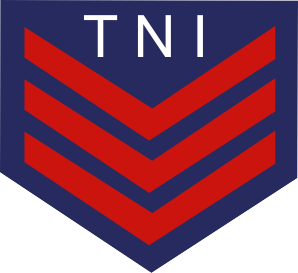
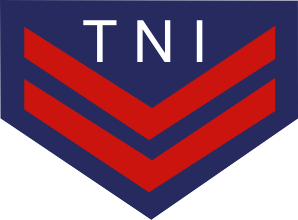
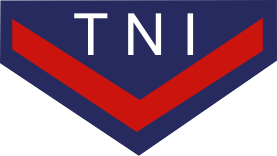
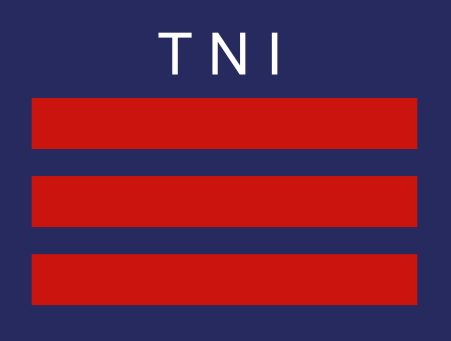
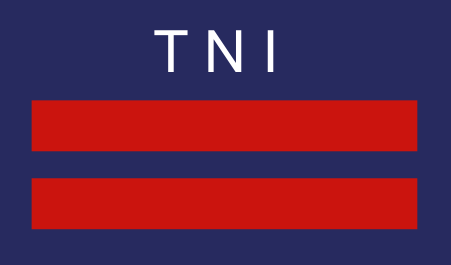
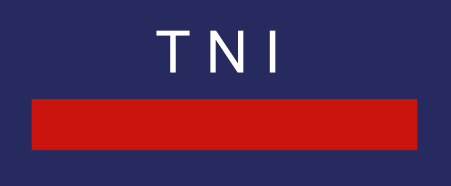
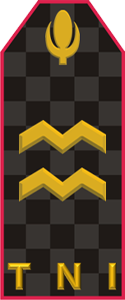
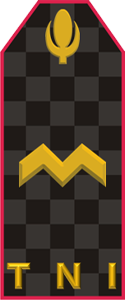
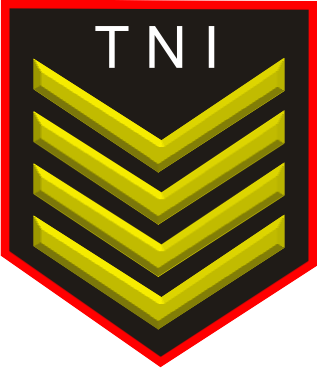
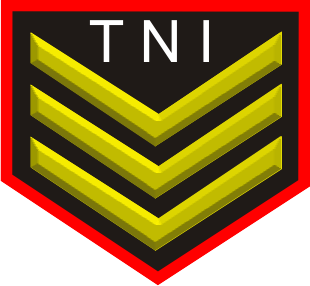
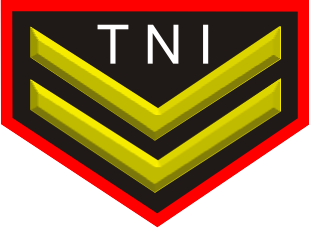
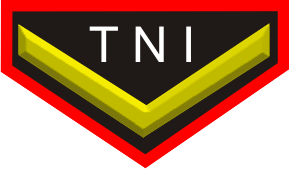
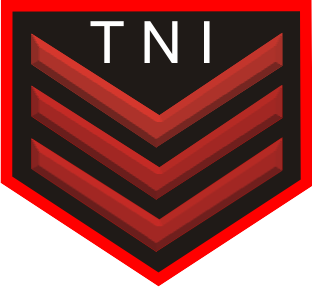
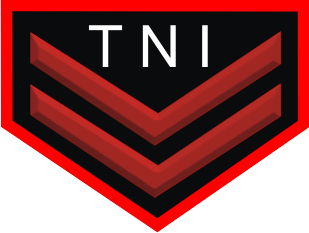
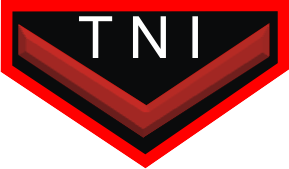
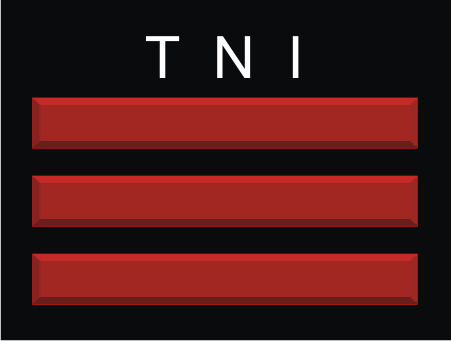
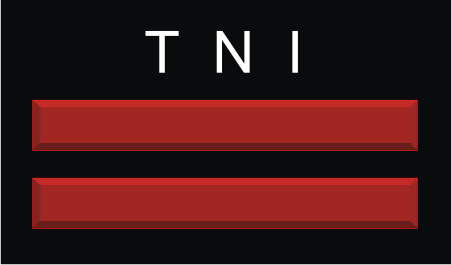
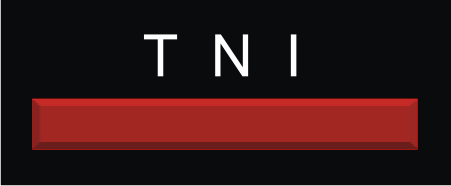
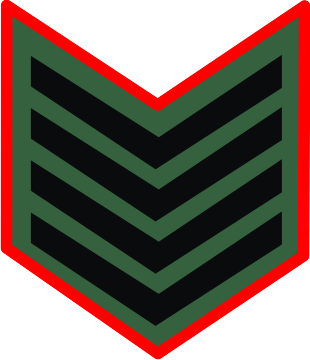
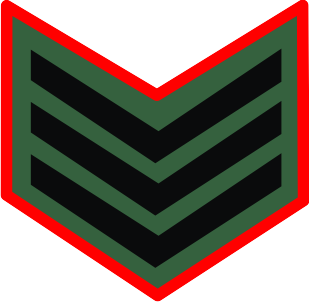
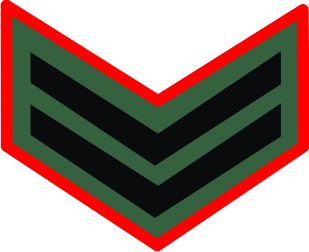
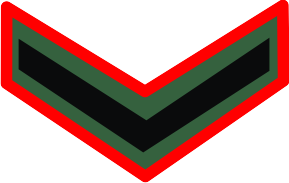
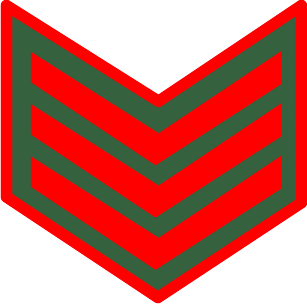
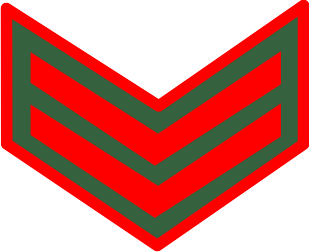
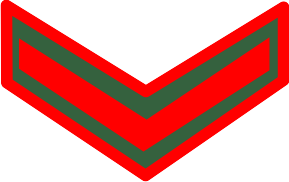
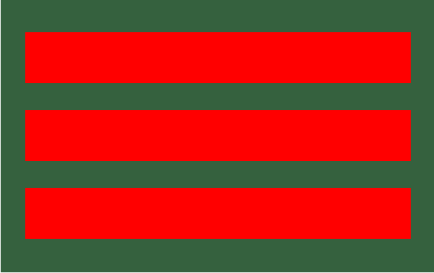
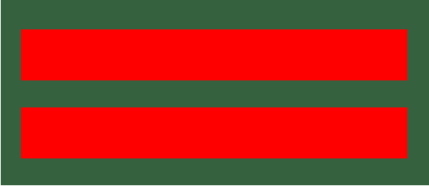
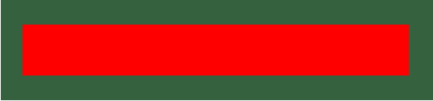
Rank group	Senior NCOs						Junior NCOs			Enlisted
Indonesian Army
Indonesian Army	Pembantu letnan satu	Pembantu letnan dua	Sersan mayor	Sersan kepala	Sersan satu	Sersan dua	Kopral kepala	Kopral satu	Kopral dua	Prajurit kepala	Prajurit satu	Prajurit dua
Army rank insginia on PDU
Army rank insginia on PDL
Indonesian Navy
Indonesian Navy	Pembantu letnan satu	Pembantu letnan dua	Sersan mayor	Sersan kepala	Sersan satu	Sersan dua	Kopral kepala	Kopral satu	Kopral dua	Kelasi kepala	Kelasi satu	Kelasi dua
Navy rank insginia on PDU
Navy rank insginia on PDL
Indonesian Air Force
Indonesian Air Force	Pembantu letnan satu	Pembantu letnan dua	Sersan mayor	Sersan kepala	Sersan satu	Sersan dua	Kopral kepala	Kopral satu	Kopral dua	Prajurit kepala	Prajurit satu	Prajurit dua
Air Force rank insginia for PDU
Air Force rank insginia on PDL
Rank group	Senior NCOs						Junior NCOs			Enlisted

== History ==
=== Ranks between 1945–1957 ===
The following ranks were used at the beginning of the establishment of the Tentara Keamanan Rakyat (TKR, People's Security Army) in late 1945, the basis of the present day Indonesian National Armed Forces. This first rank system, with insignia following the former Imperial Japanese practice, was used until mid 1948.

The TKR's Ground, Air and Naval Forces, later the Indonesian Army, Air Force, and Navy, used these ranks with different insignias for Navy officers following Japanese and Dutch precedence. (The same Army ranks were also used by the nascent Indonesian Marine Corps which was established at the same time.)

In 1950 the Navy received updated officer shoulder board insignia which removed the executive curl on the shoulder board mark.

- Note: Previous spelling used until 1973 was utilised.

==== Indonesian Army ====
===== Commissioned officers =====
The following were the rank insignia of commissioned officers.

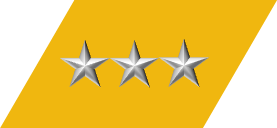
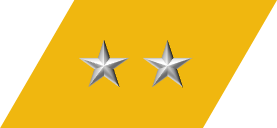
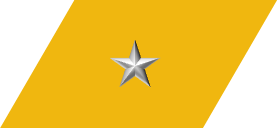
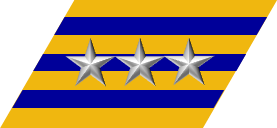
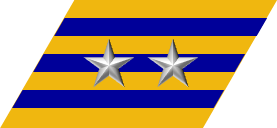
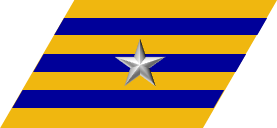
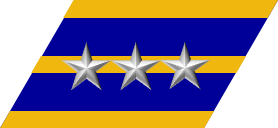
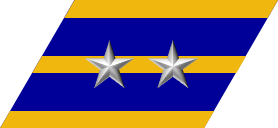
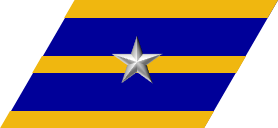
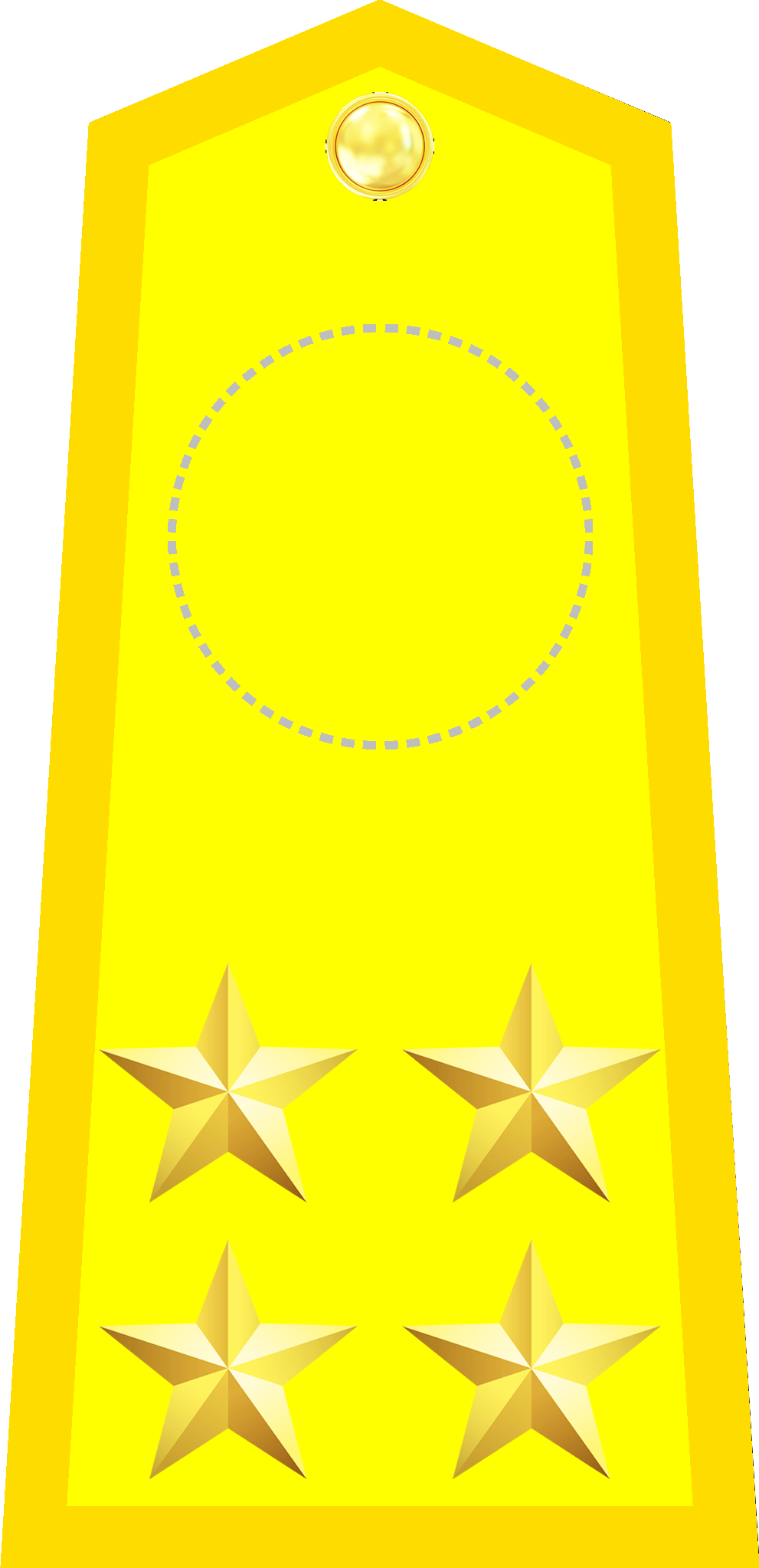
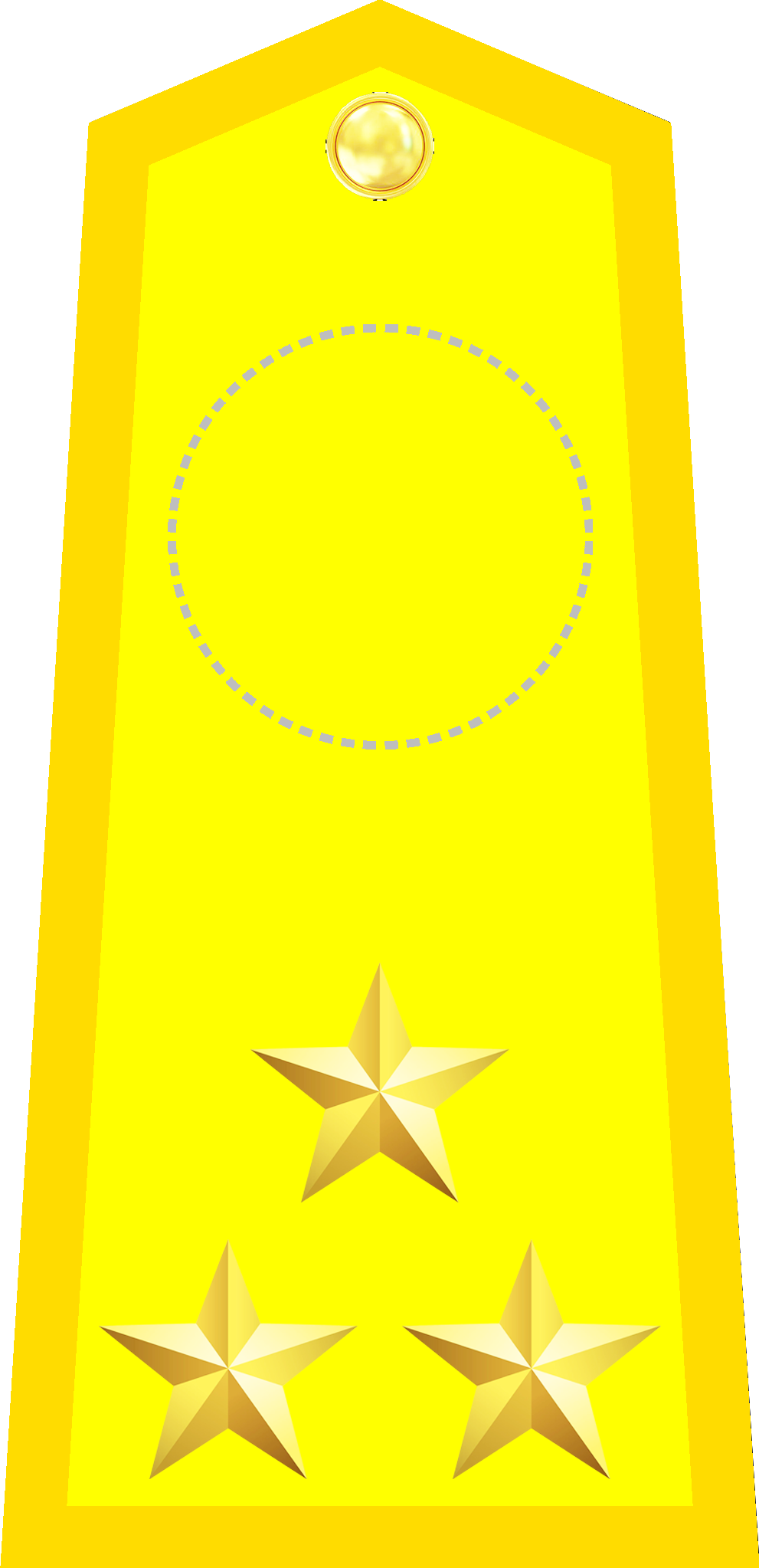
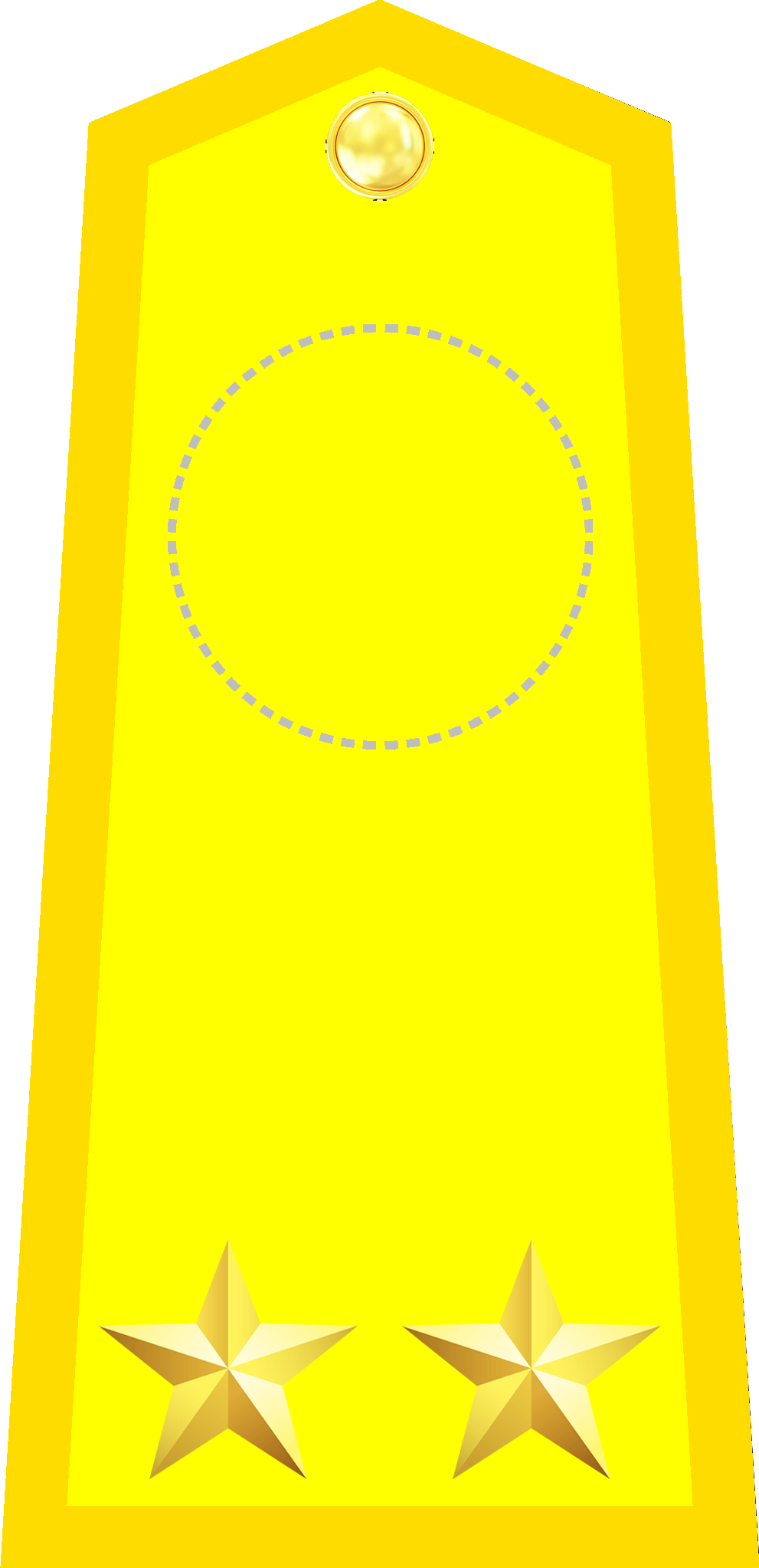
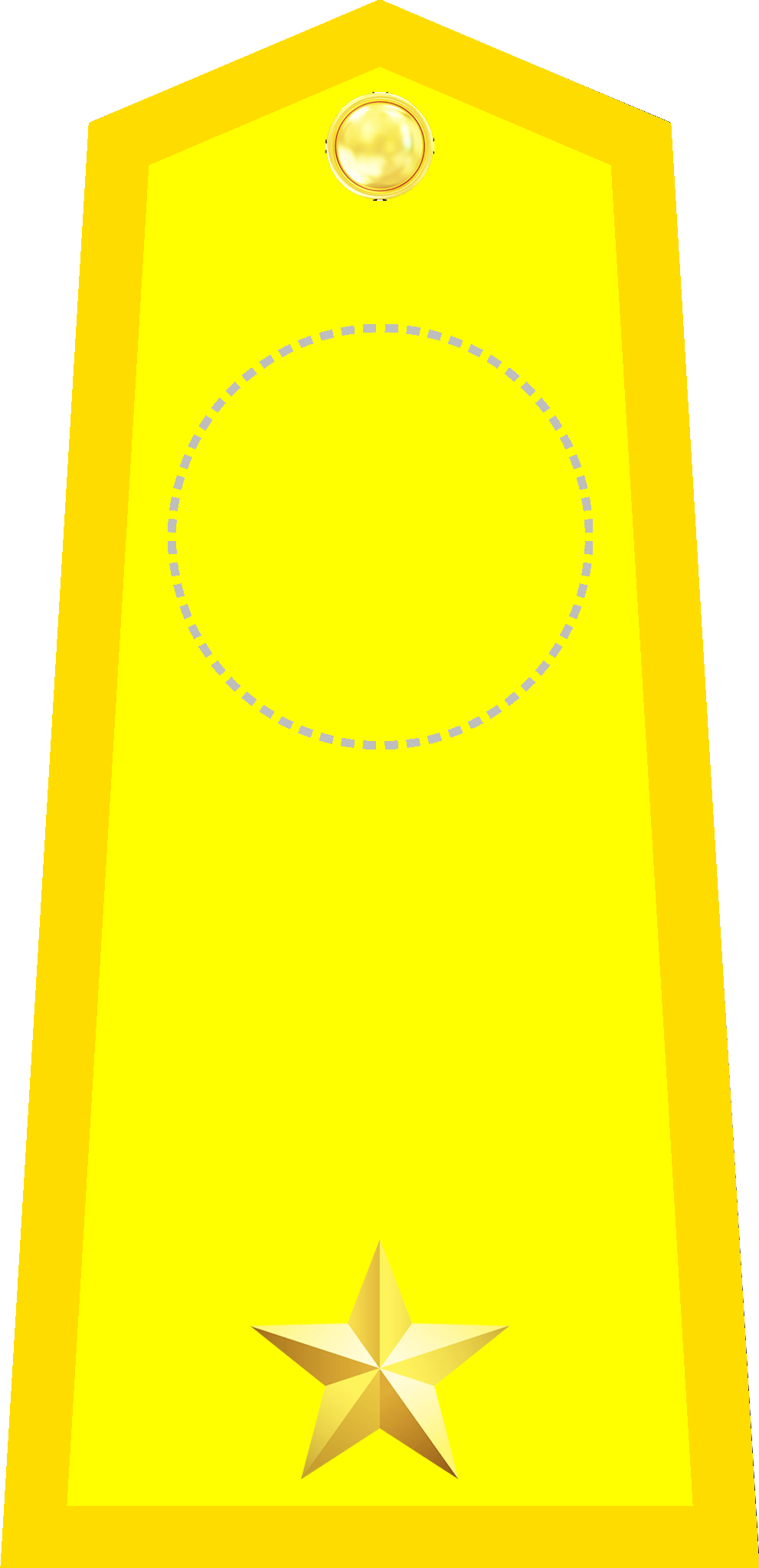
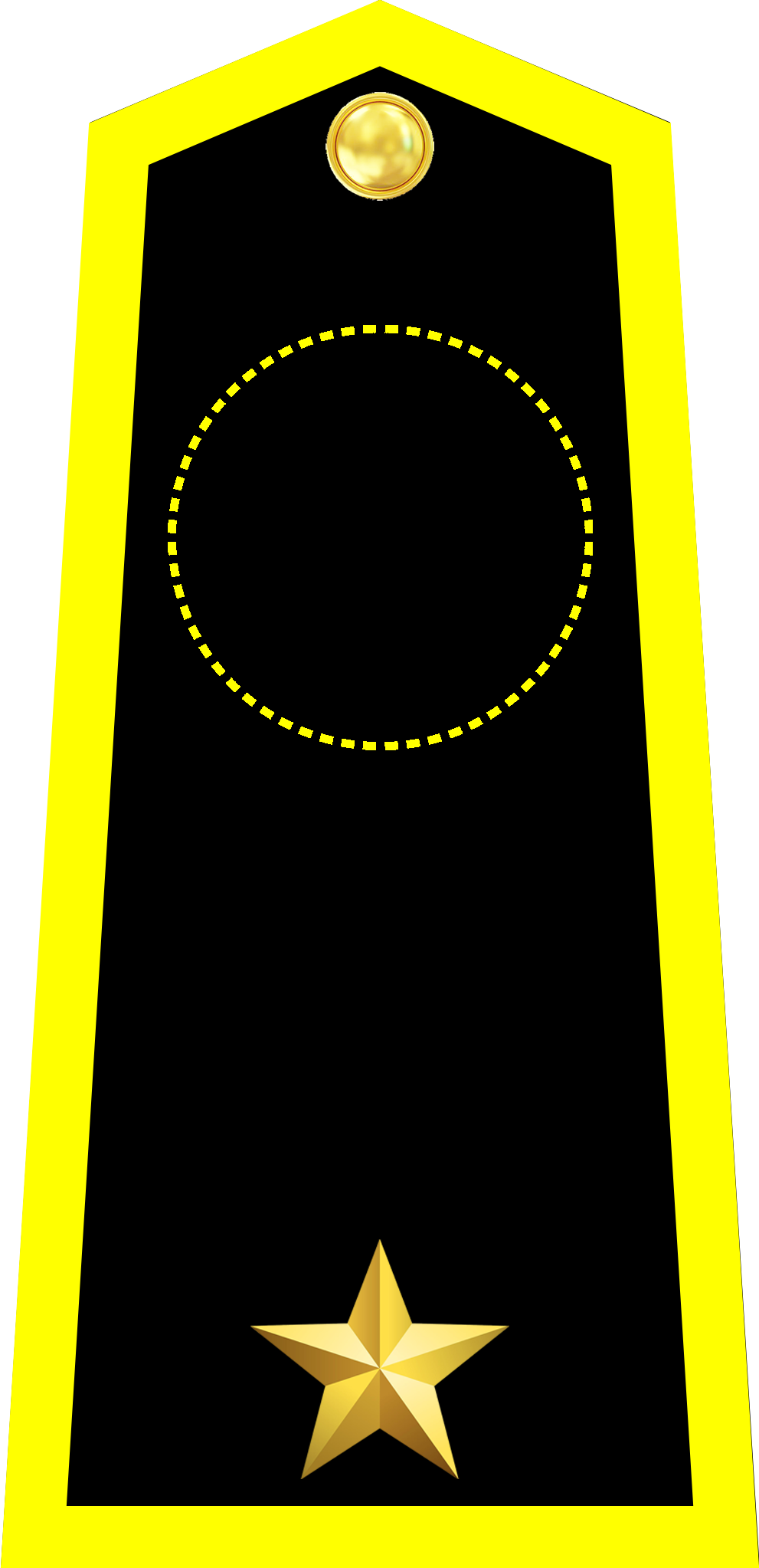
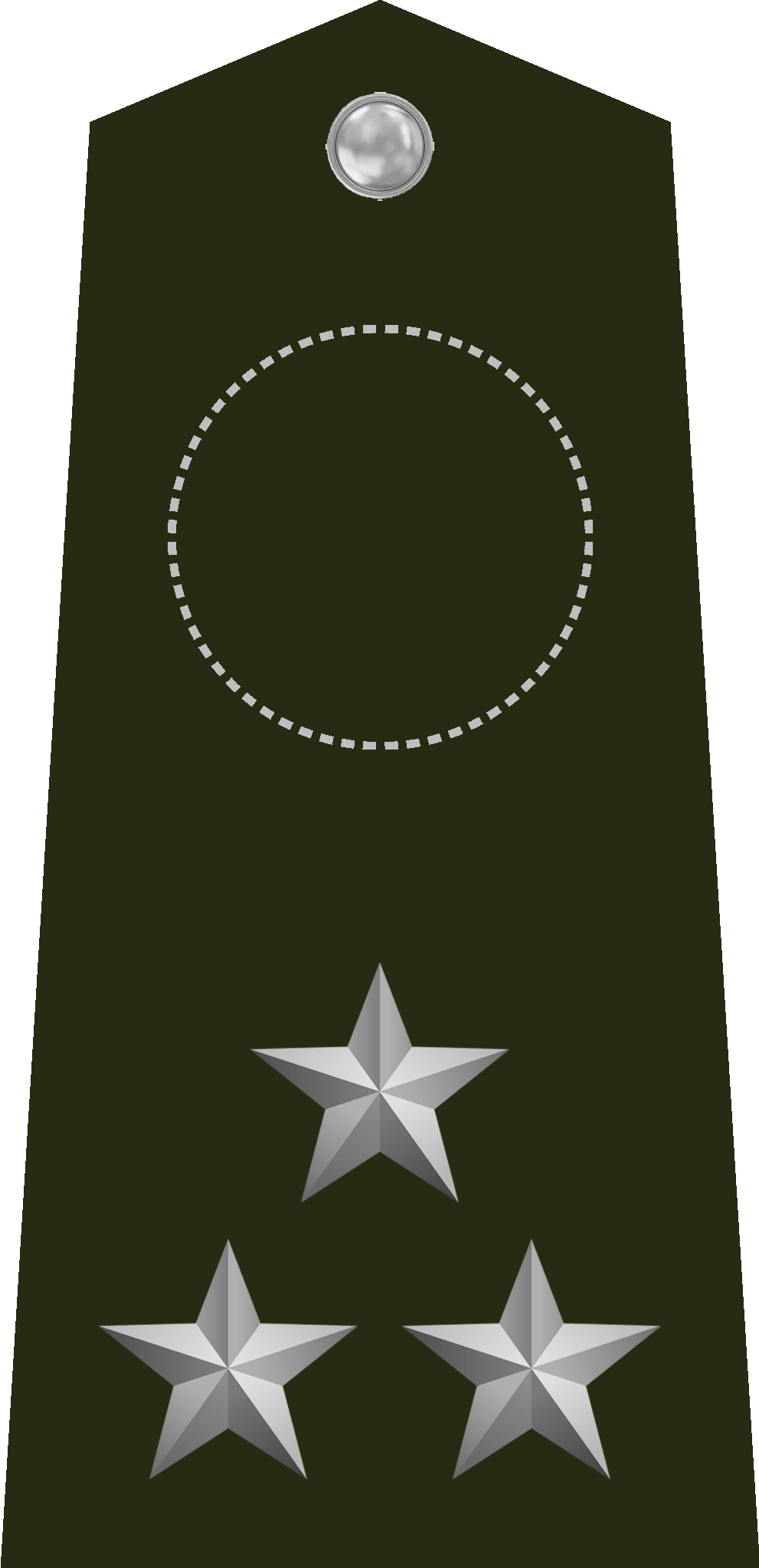
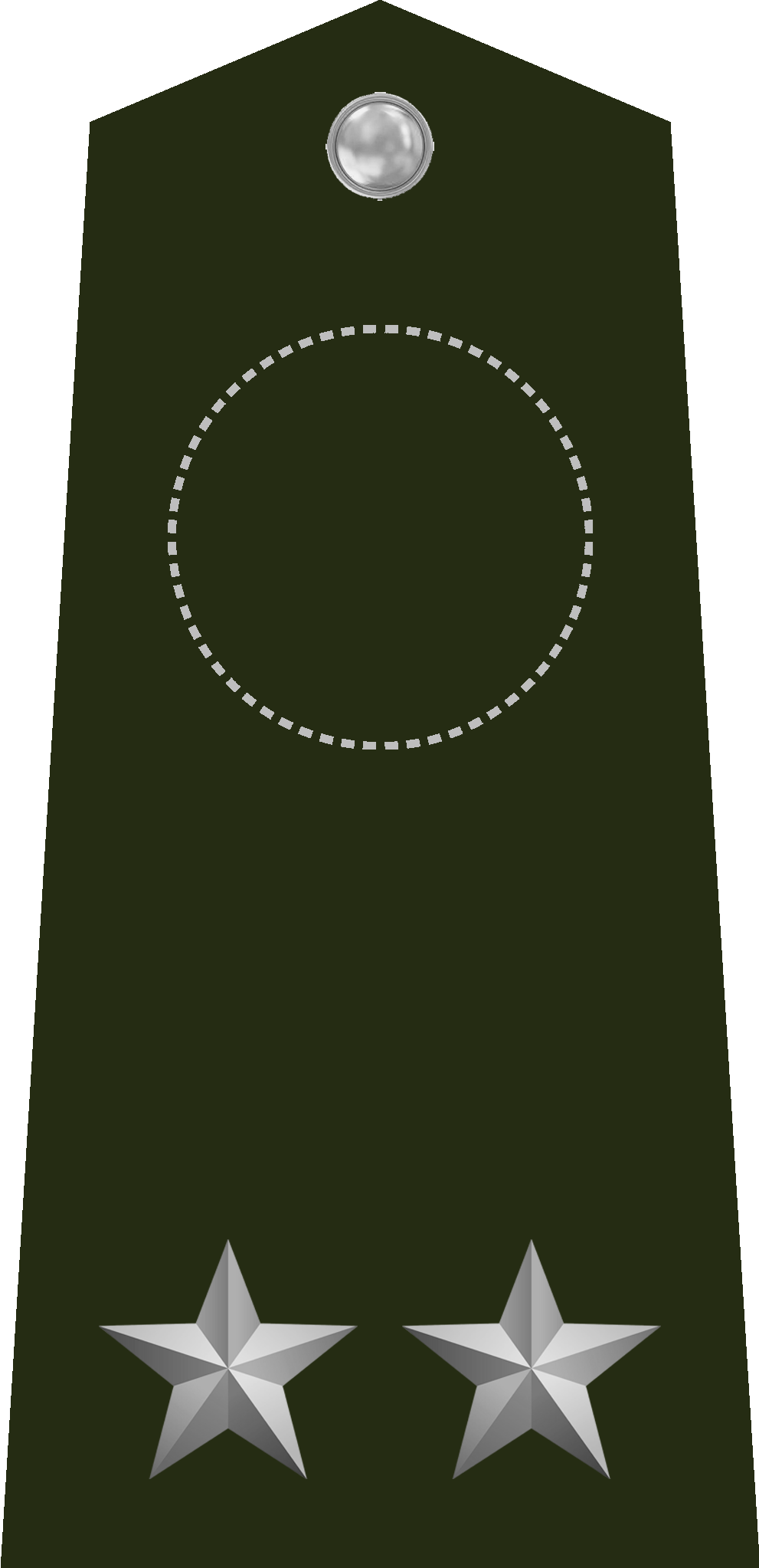
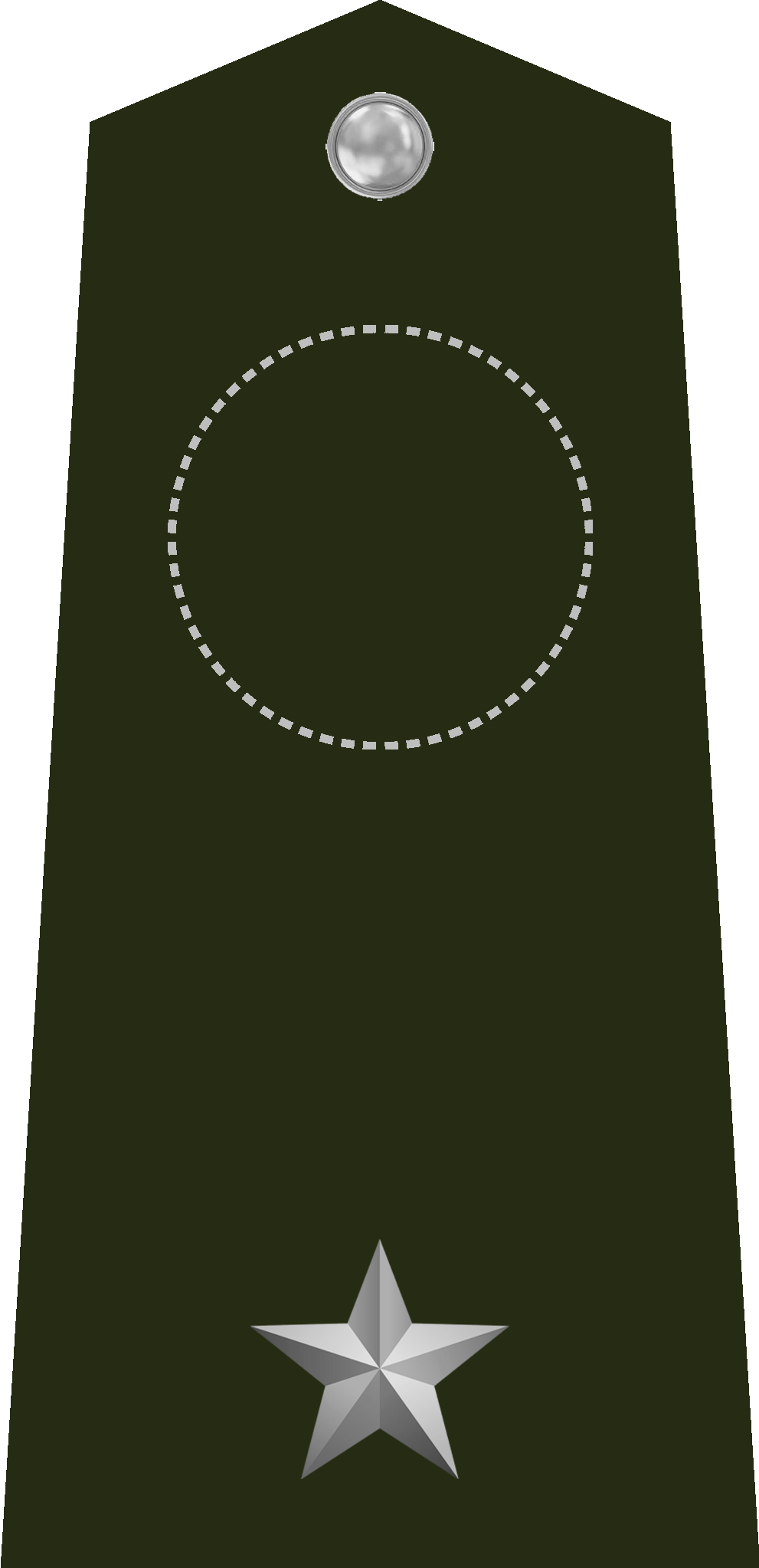
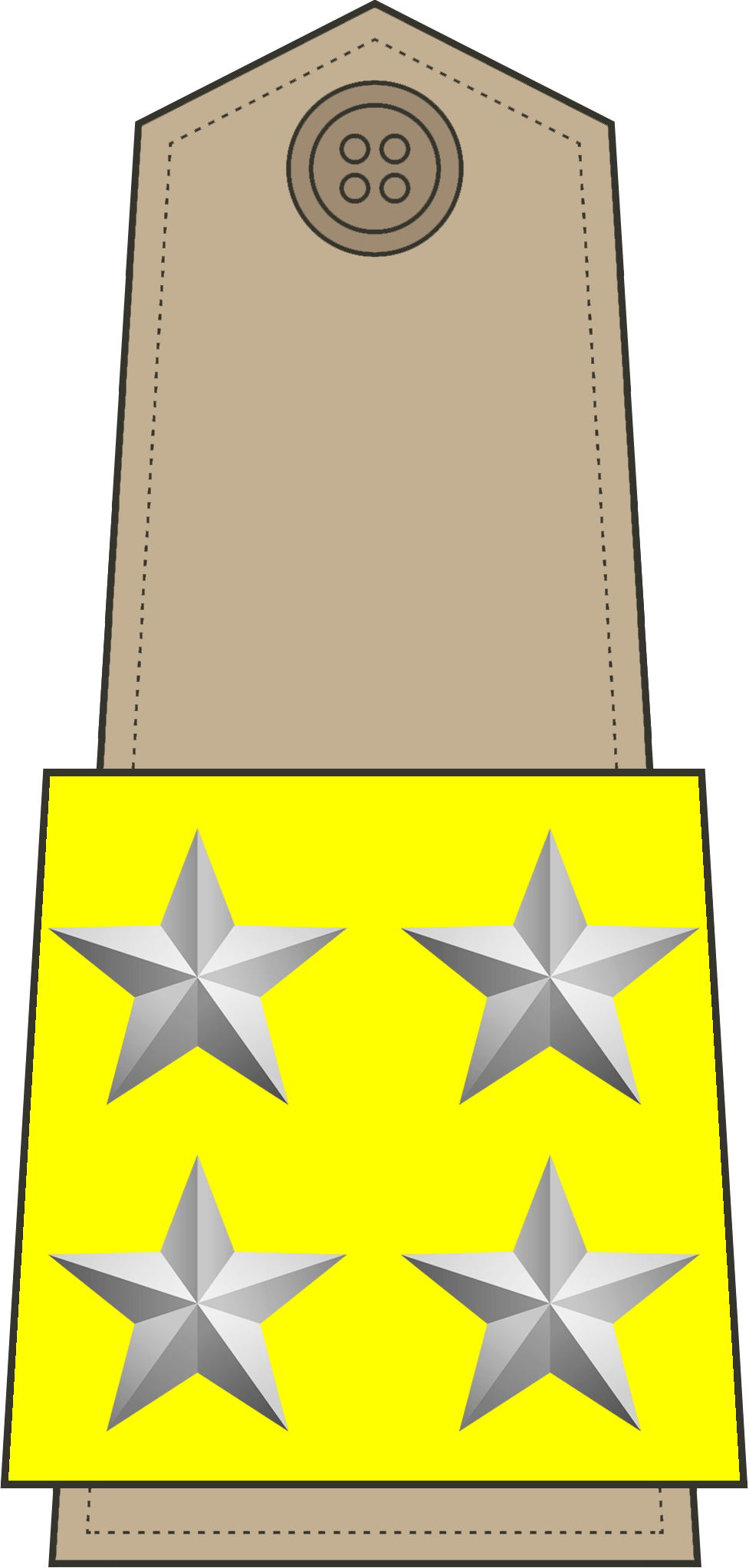
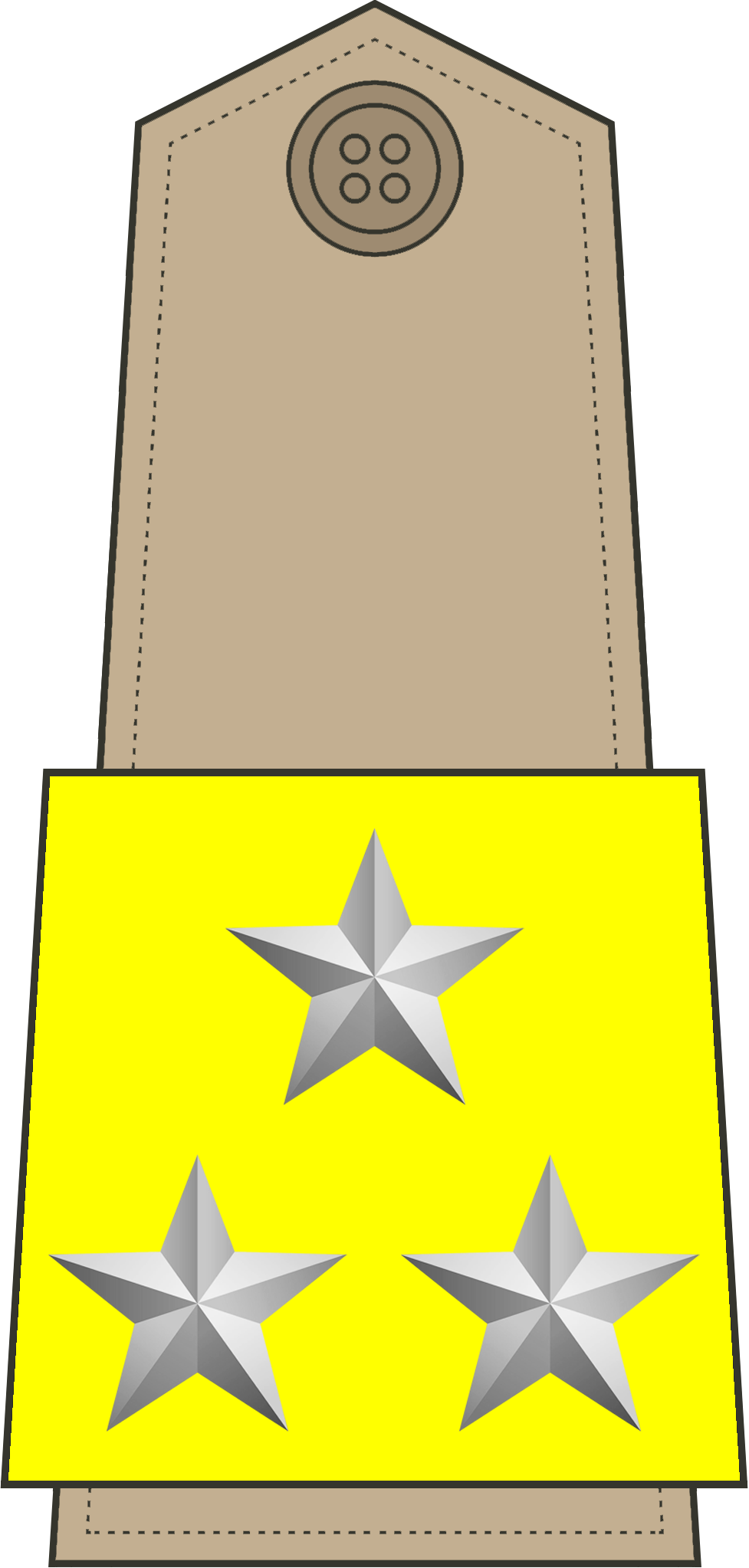
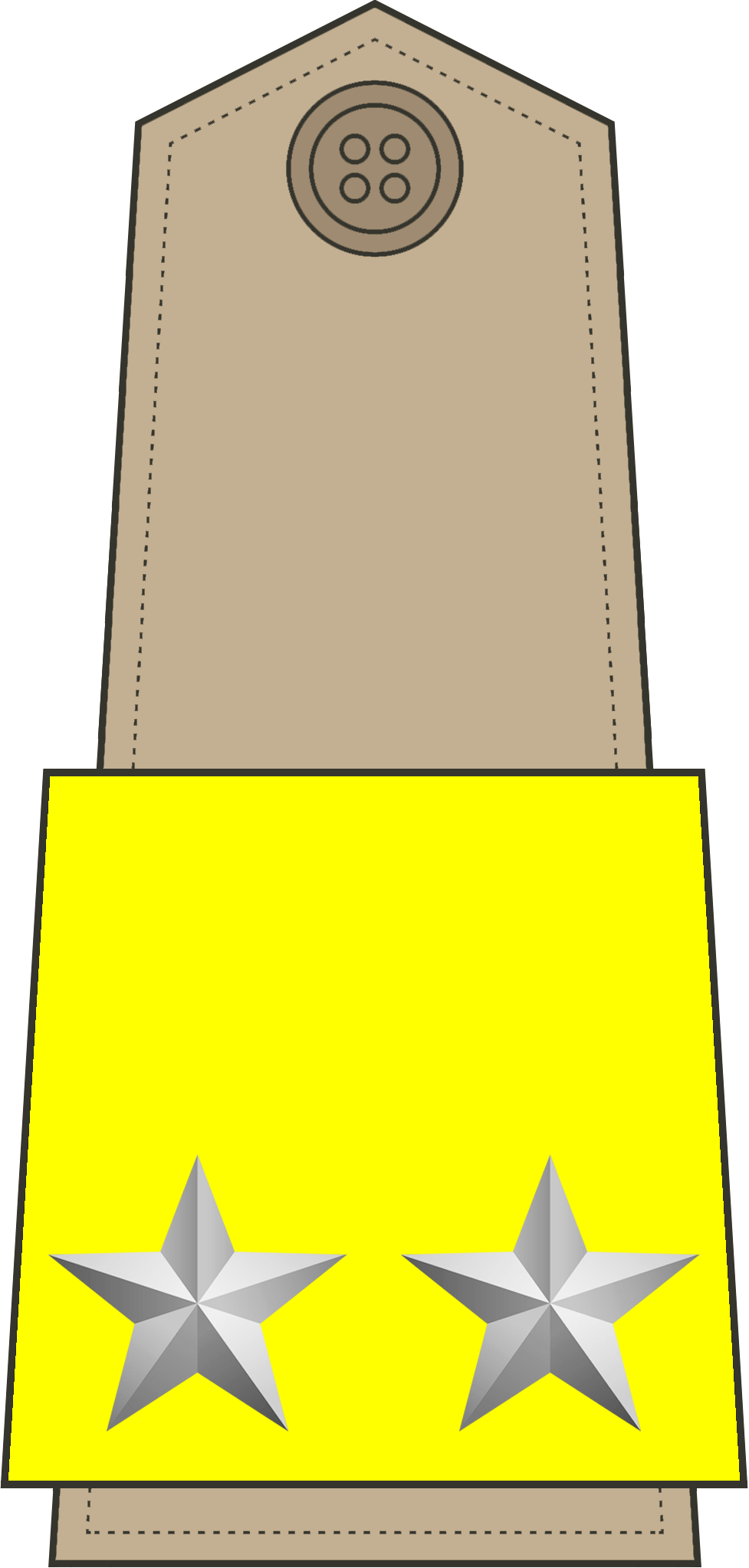
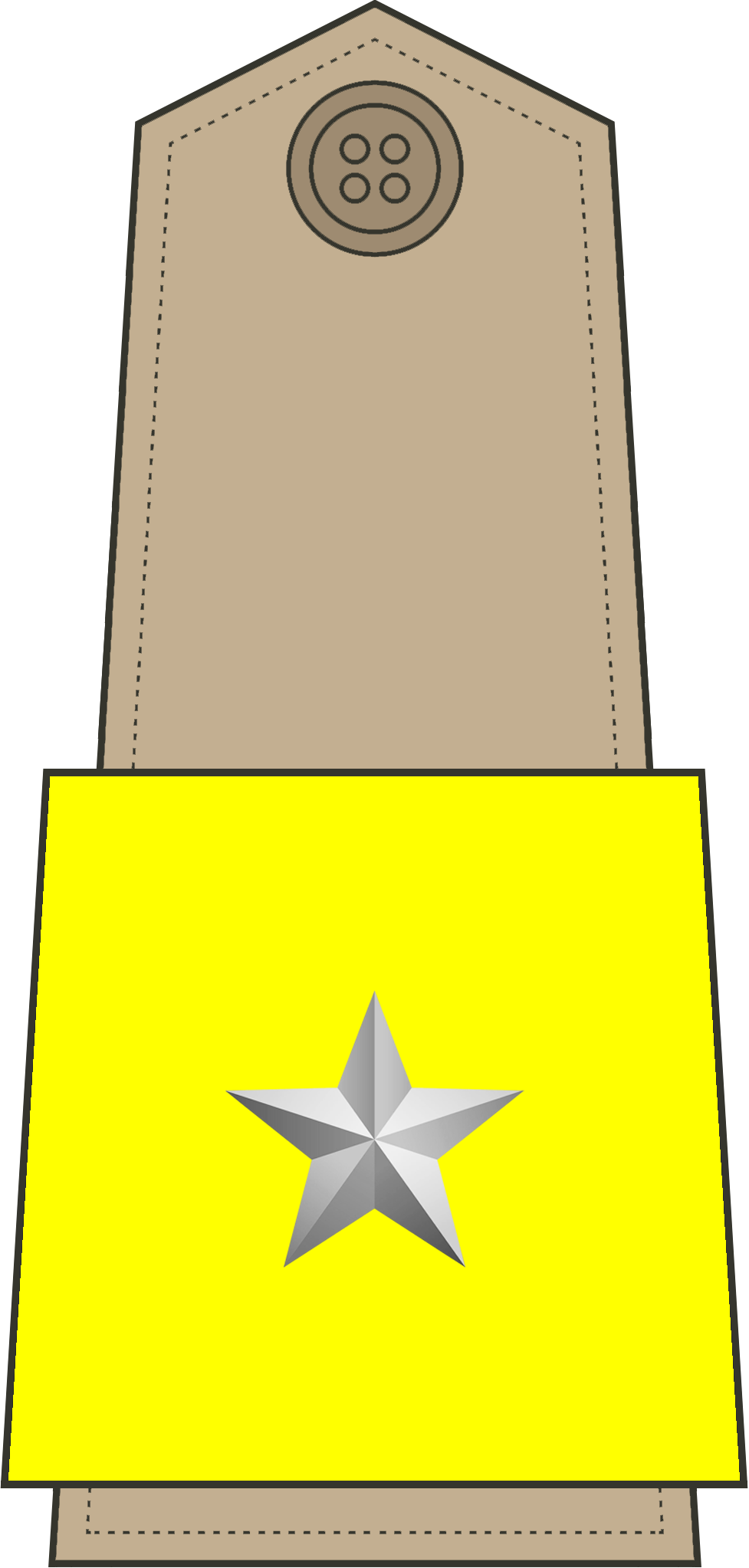
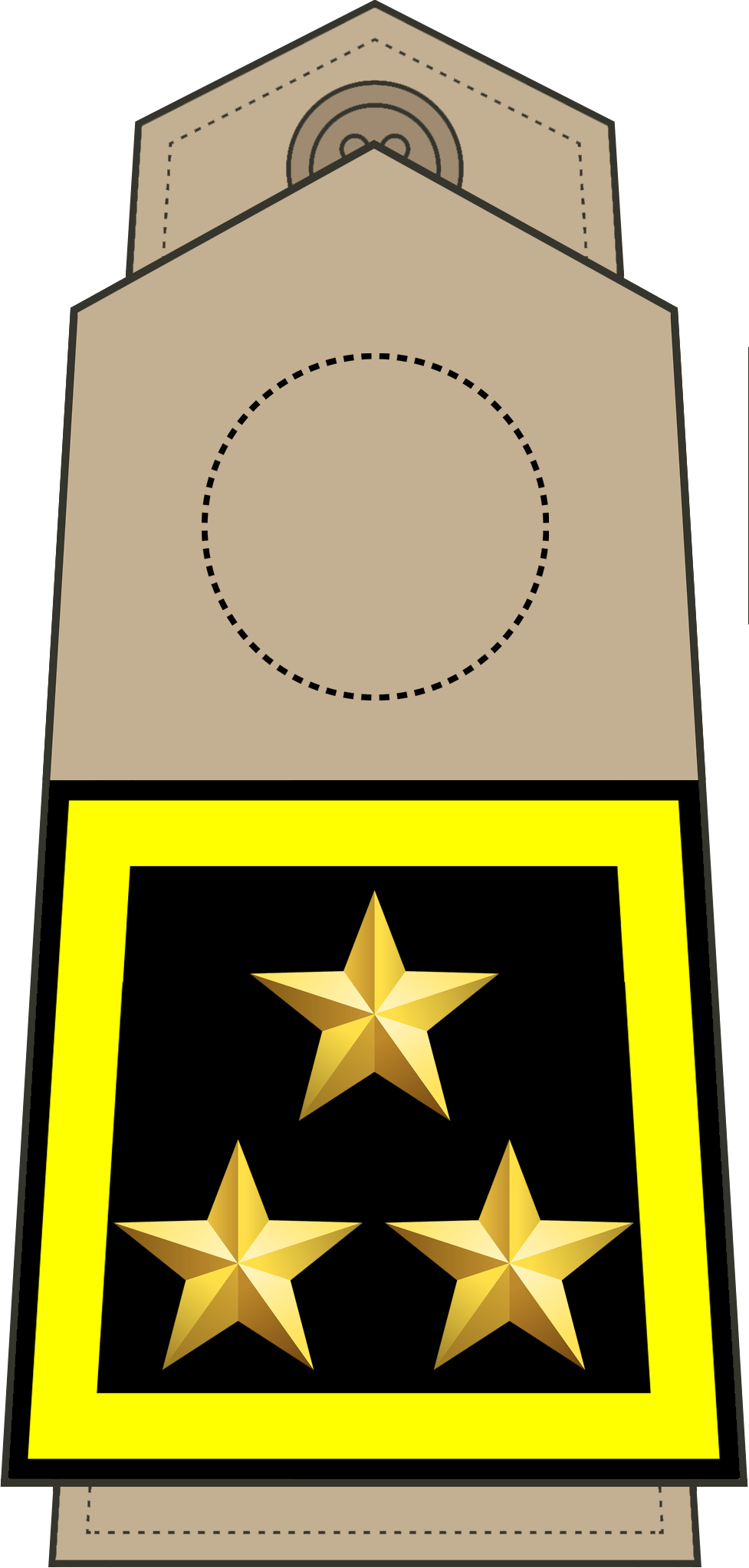
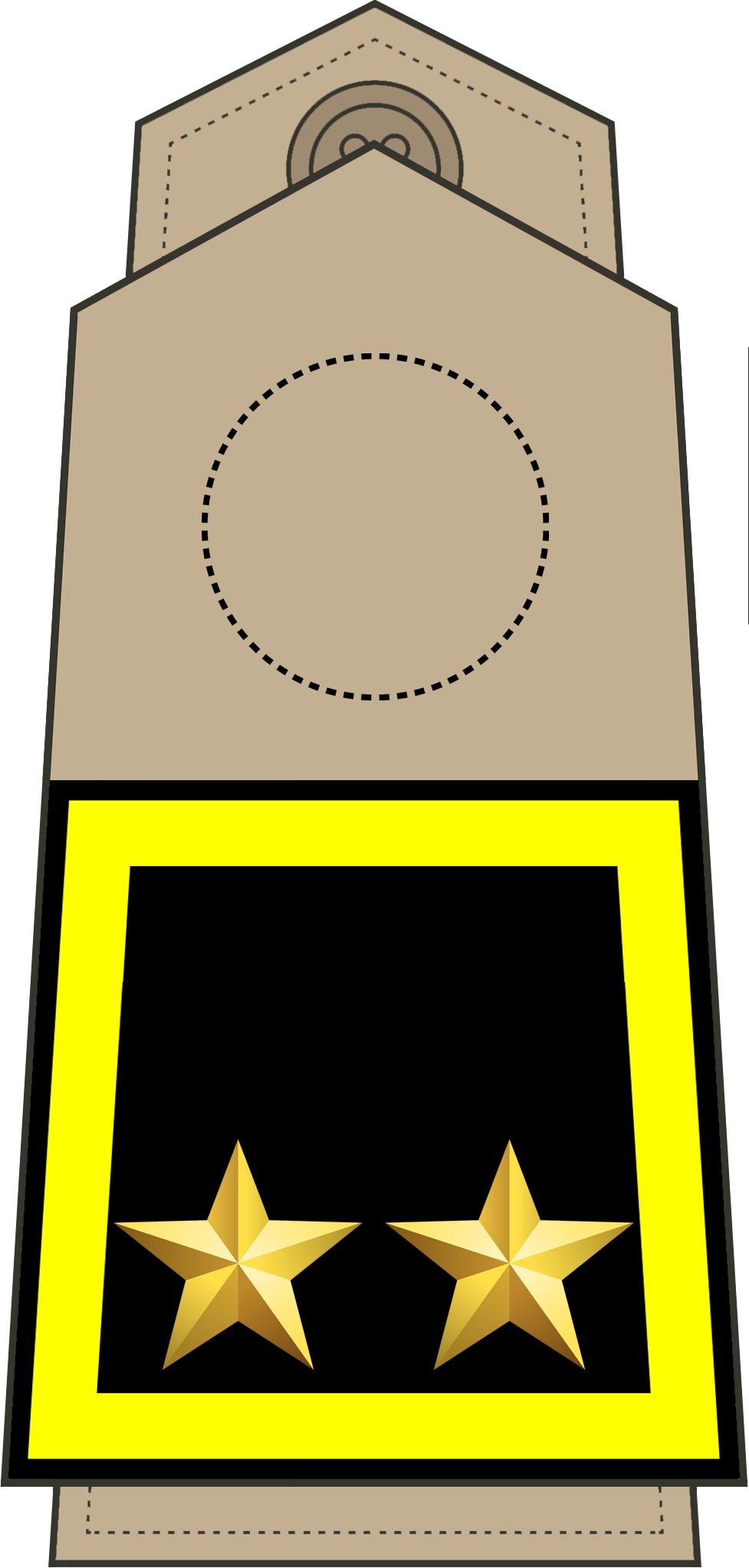
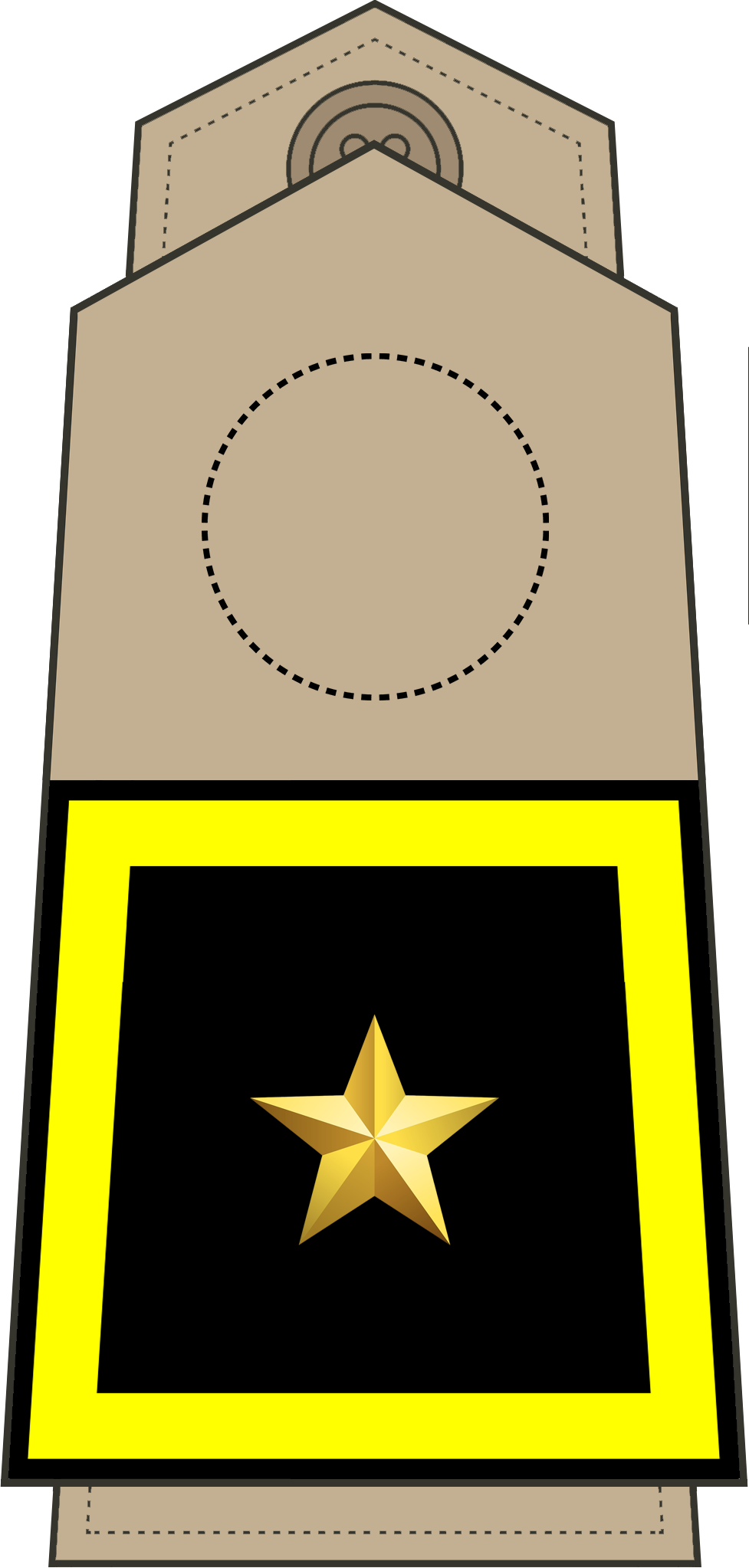
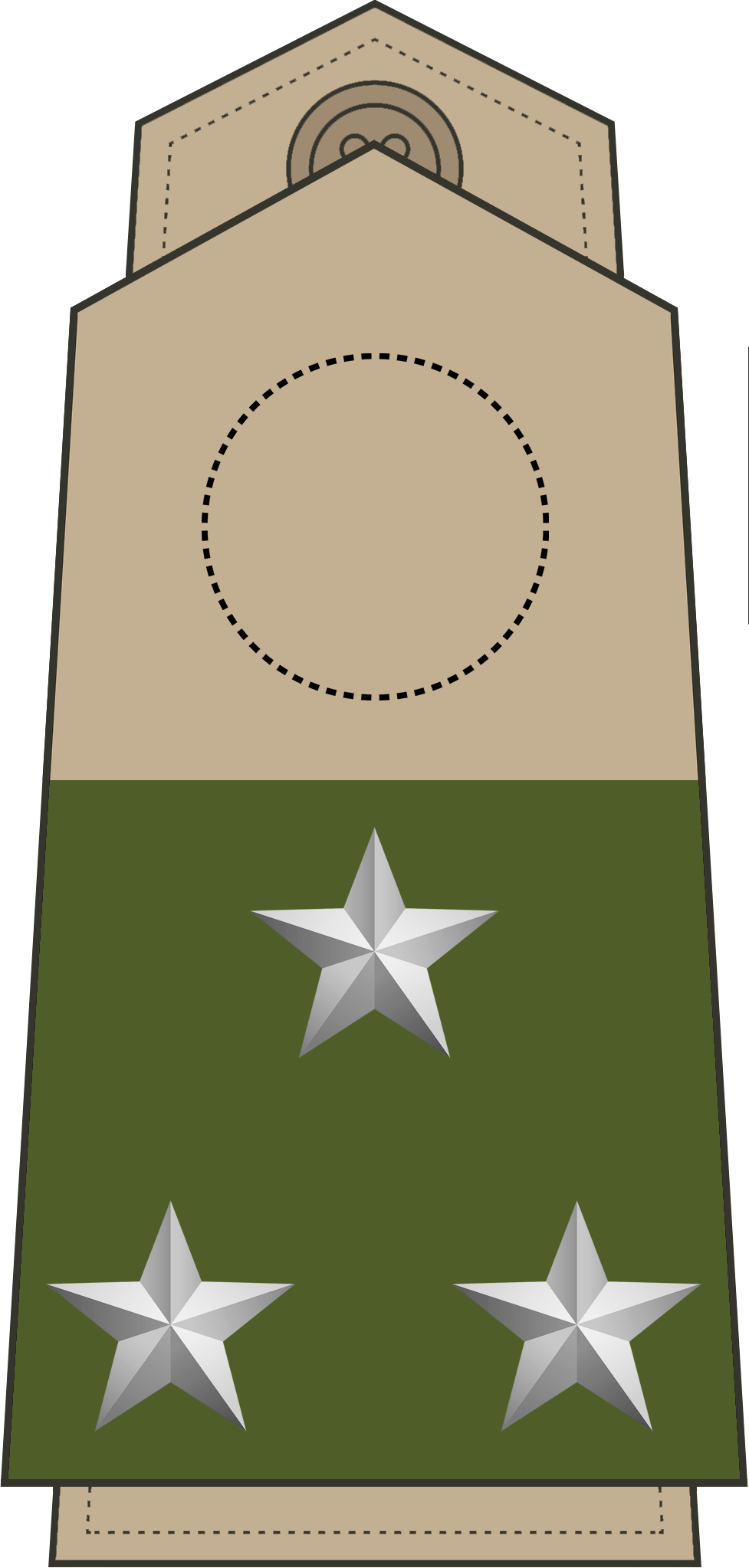
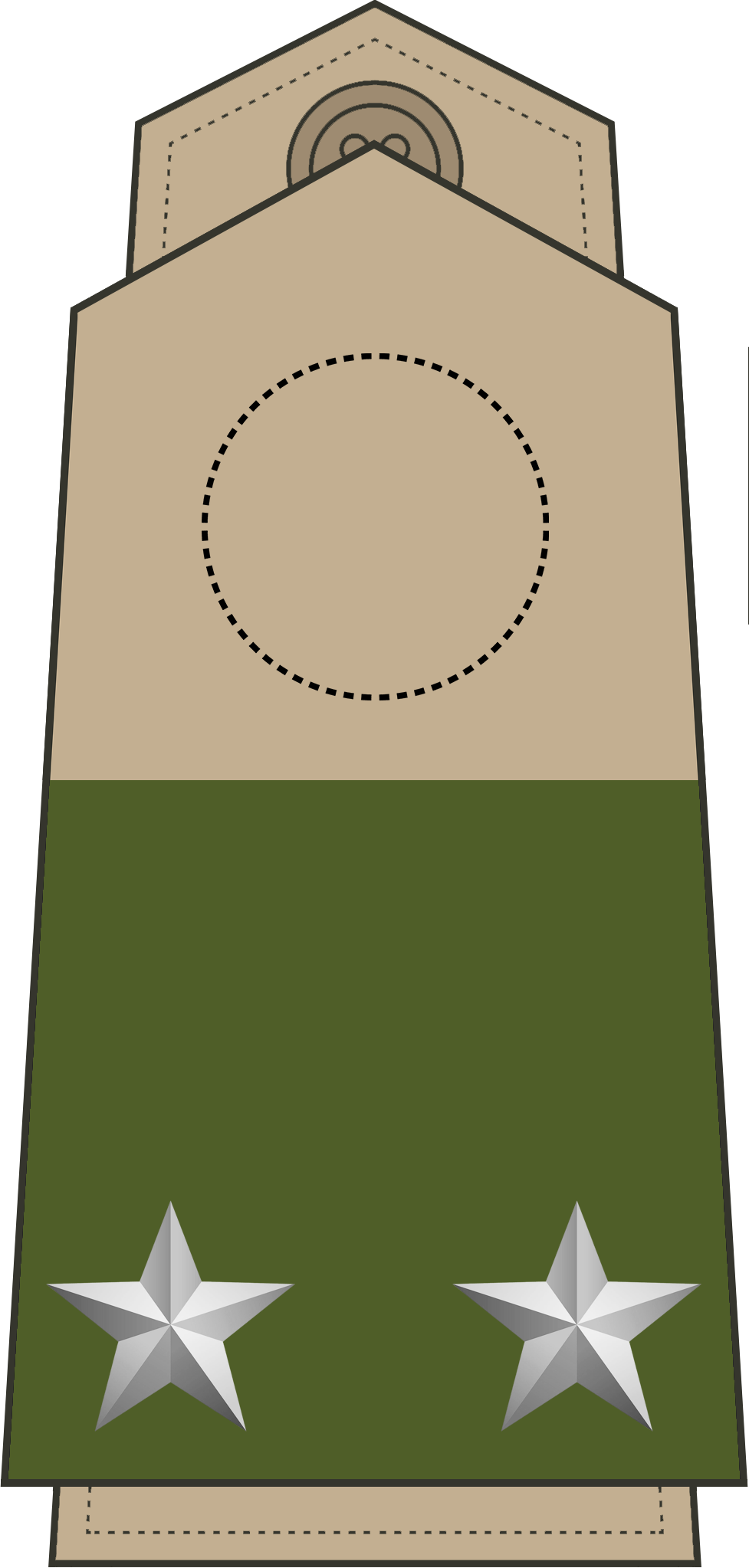
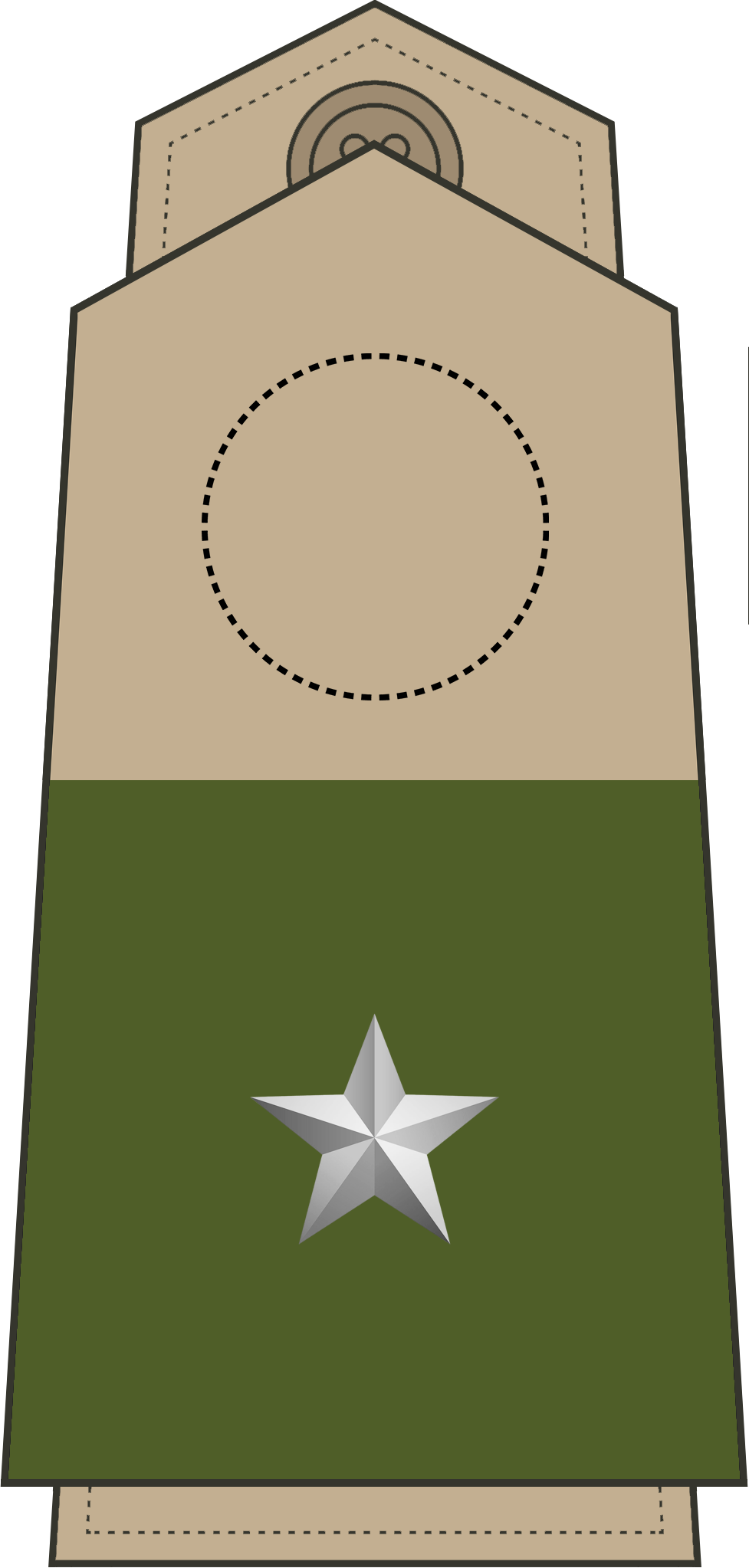
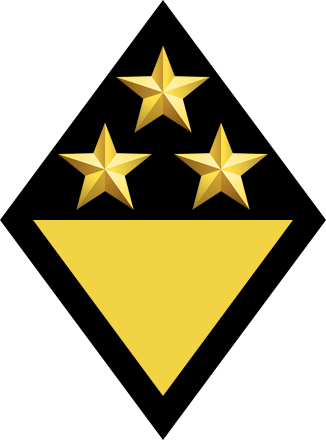
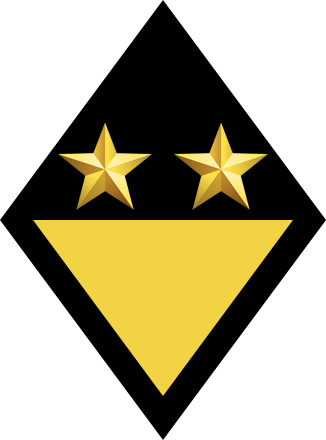
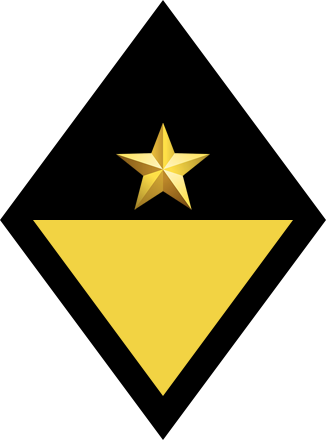
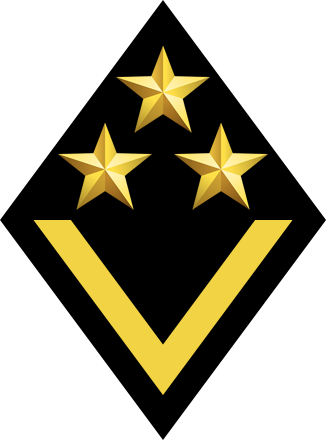
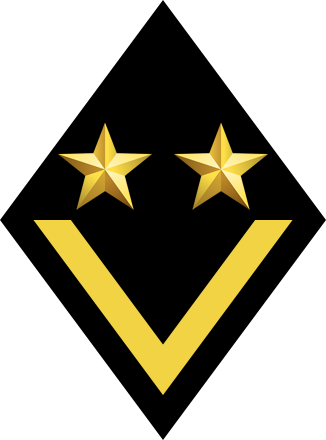
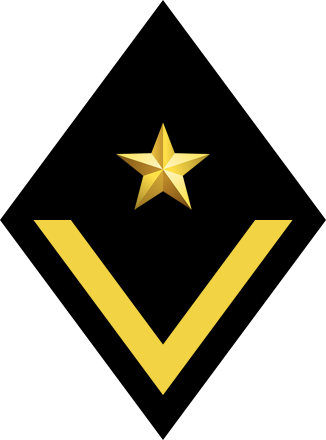
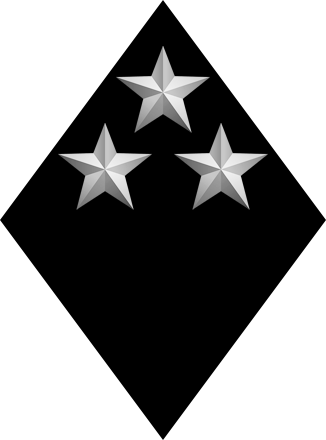
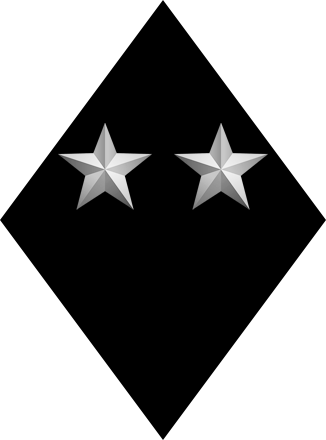
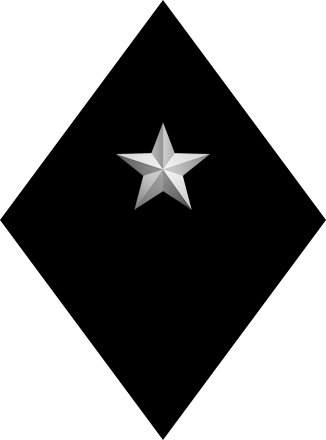
1945-1949
Rank group		General officers			Field officers			Junior officers
Rank		Djenderal	Letnan djenderal	Djenderal major	Kolonel	Letnan kolonel	Mayor	Kapten	Letnan I	Letnan II
Insignia
1949-1957
Rank	Djenderal Besar (adopted 1950)	Djenderal	Letnan djenderal	Djenderal major	Kolonel	Letnan kolonel	Mayor	Kapten	Letnan I	Letnan II
Insignia Full dress uniform
Insignia Service dress uniform
Insignia Combat uniform	No Insignia

===== Enlisted personnel =====
The rank insignia of non-commissioned officers and enlisted personnels.

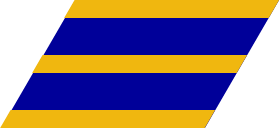
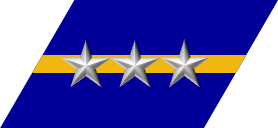
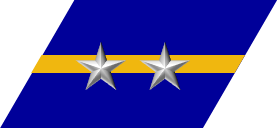
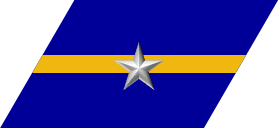
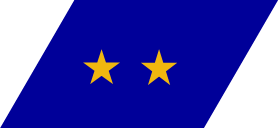
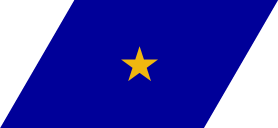
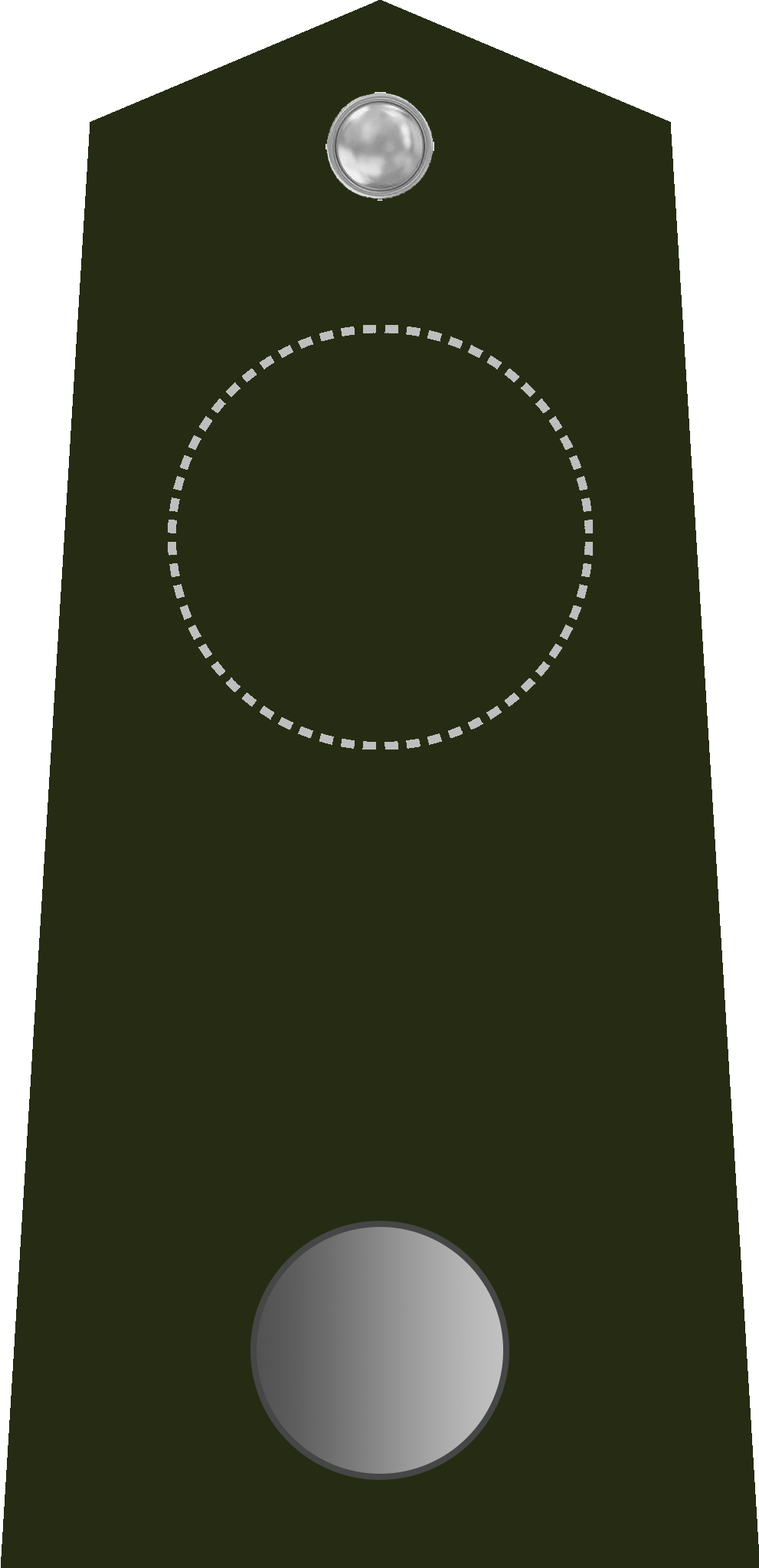
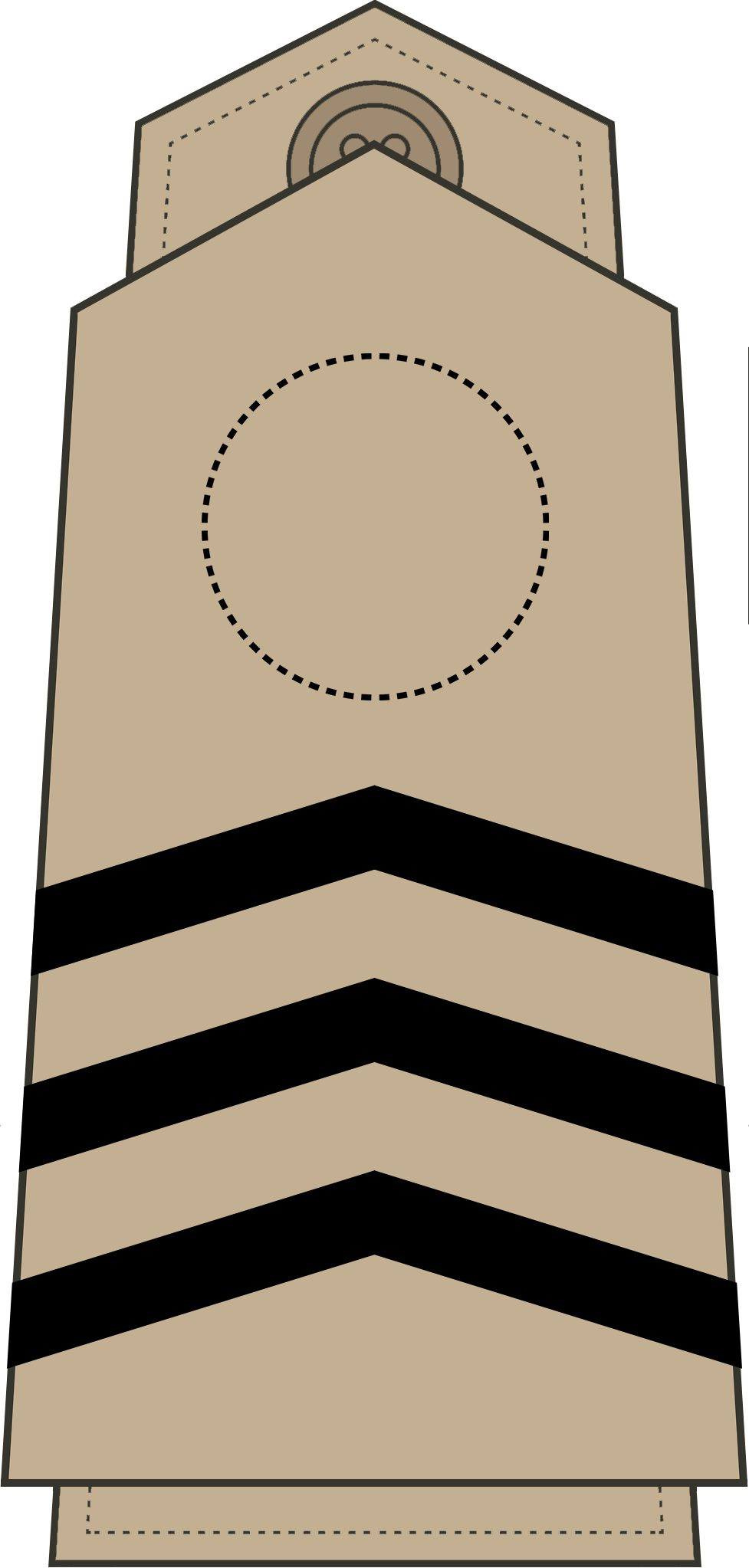
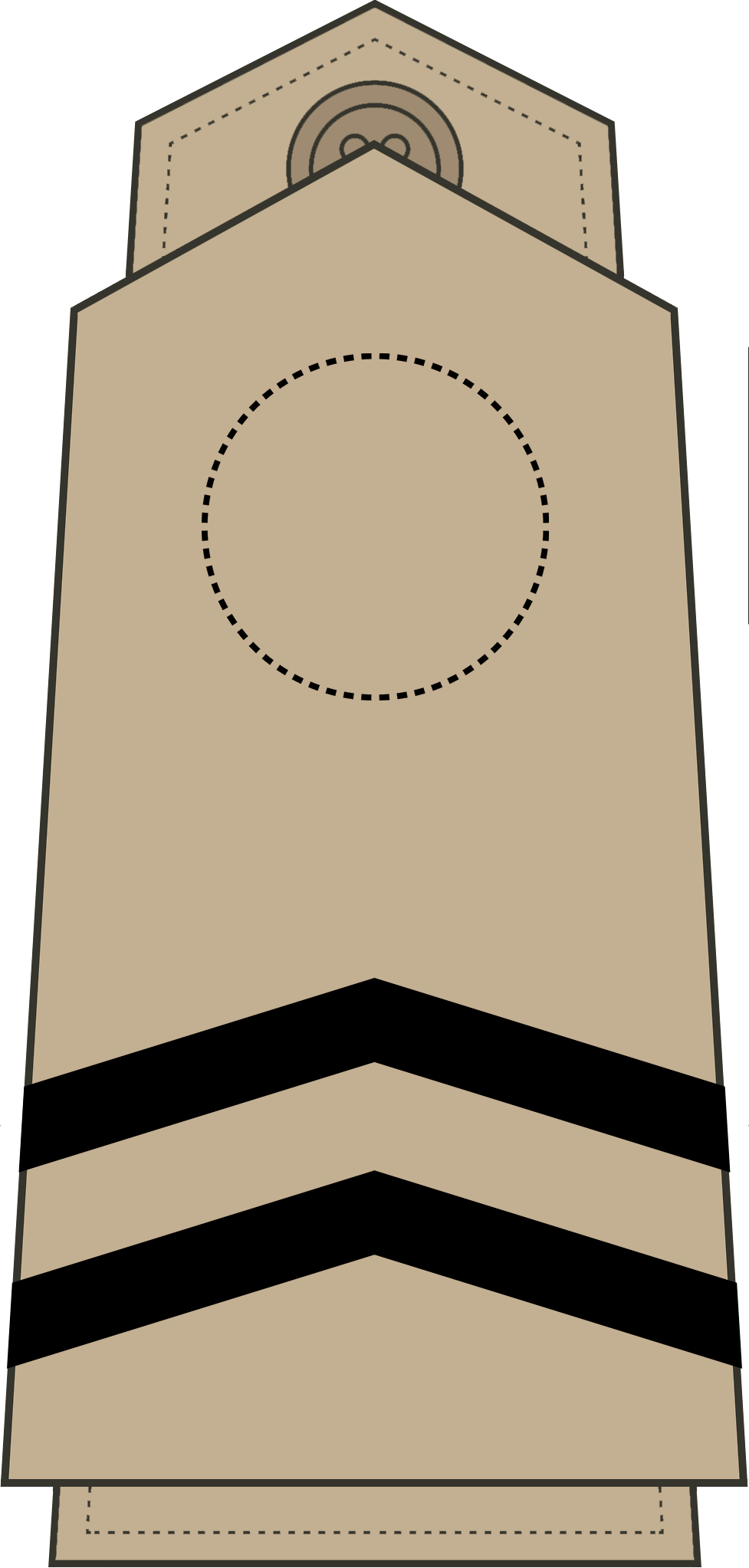
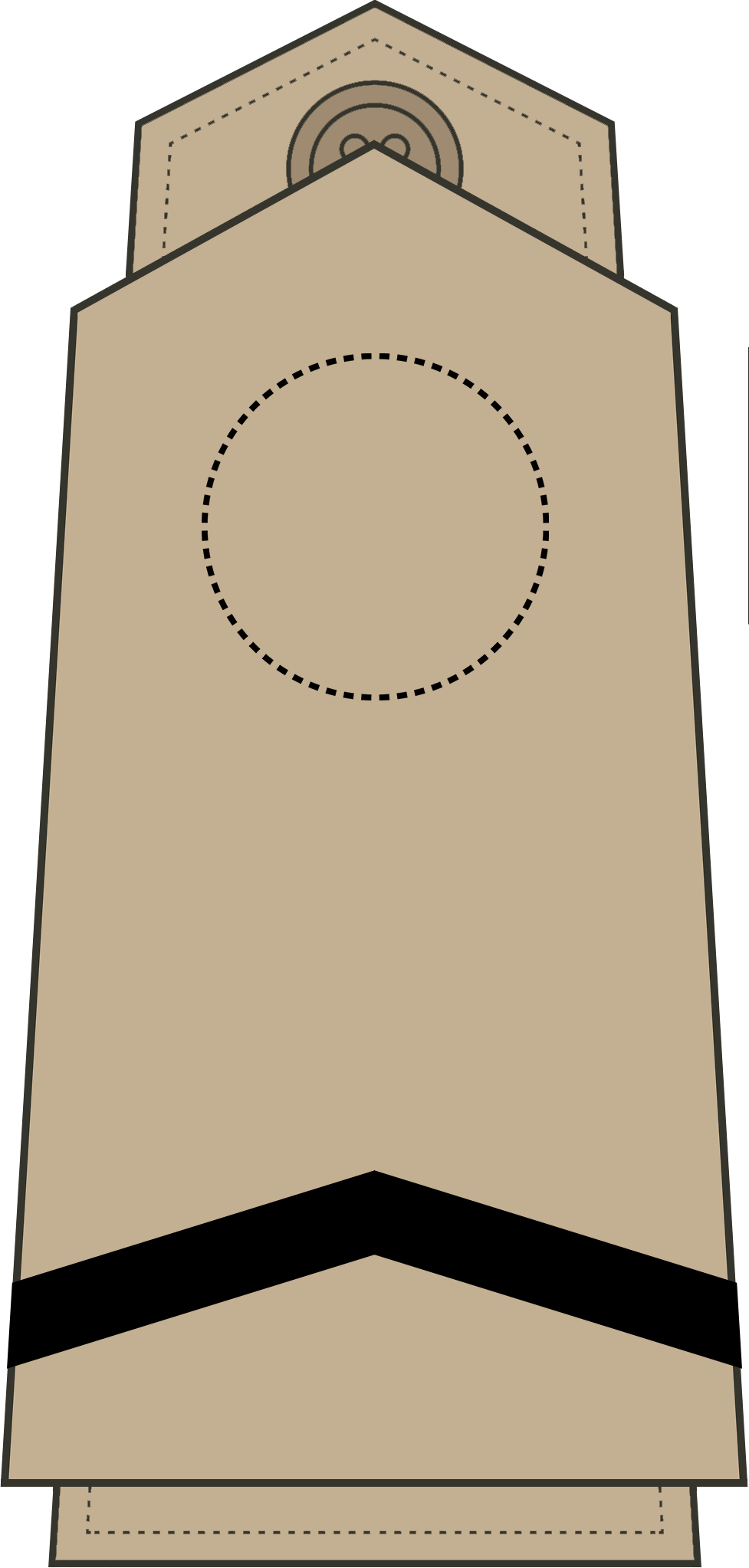
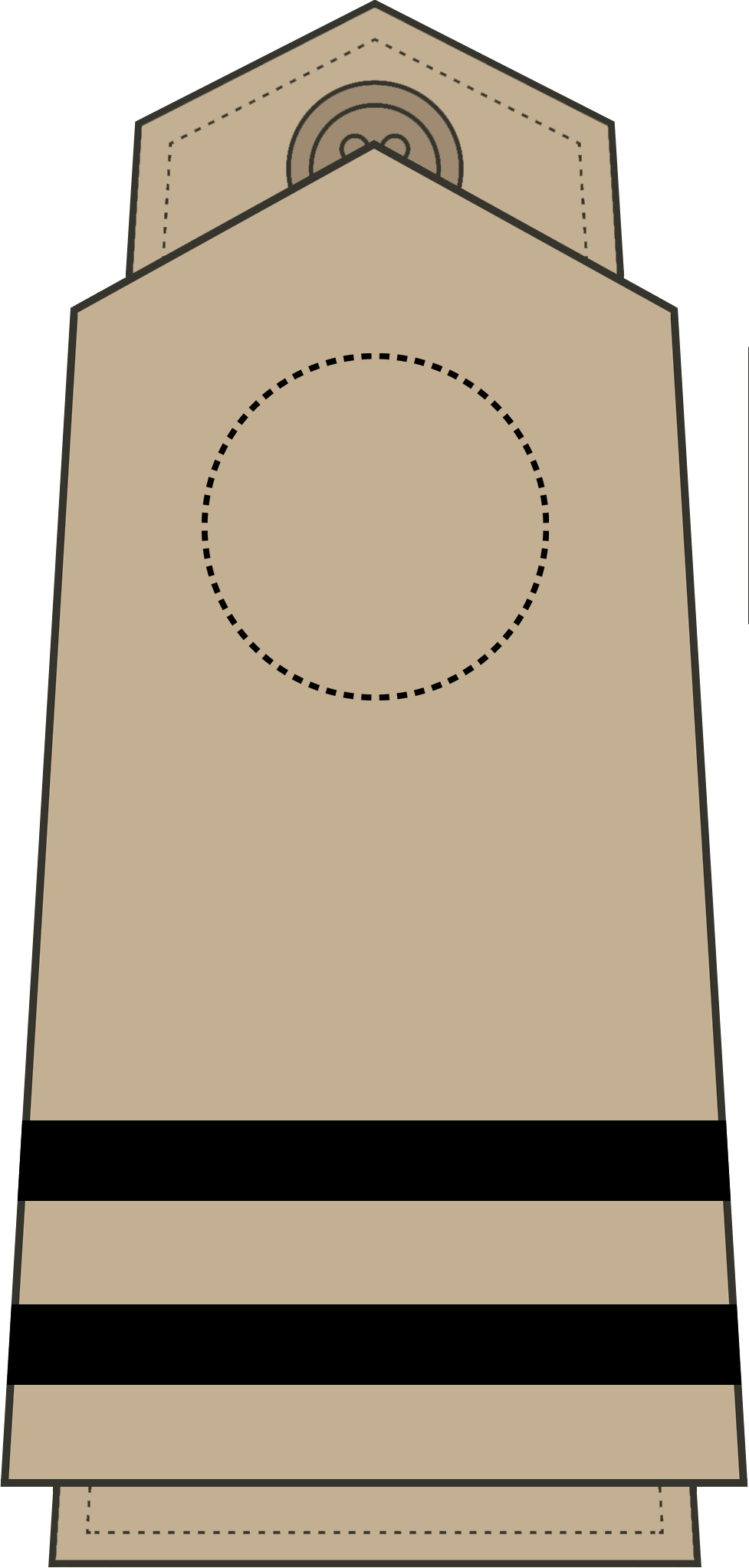
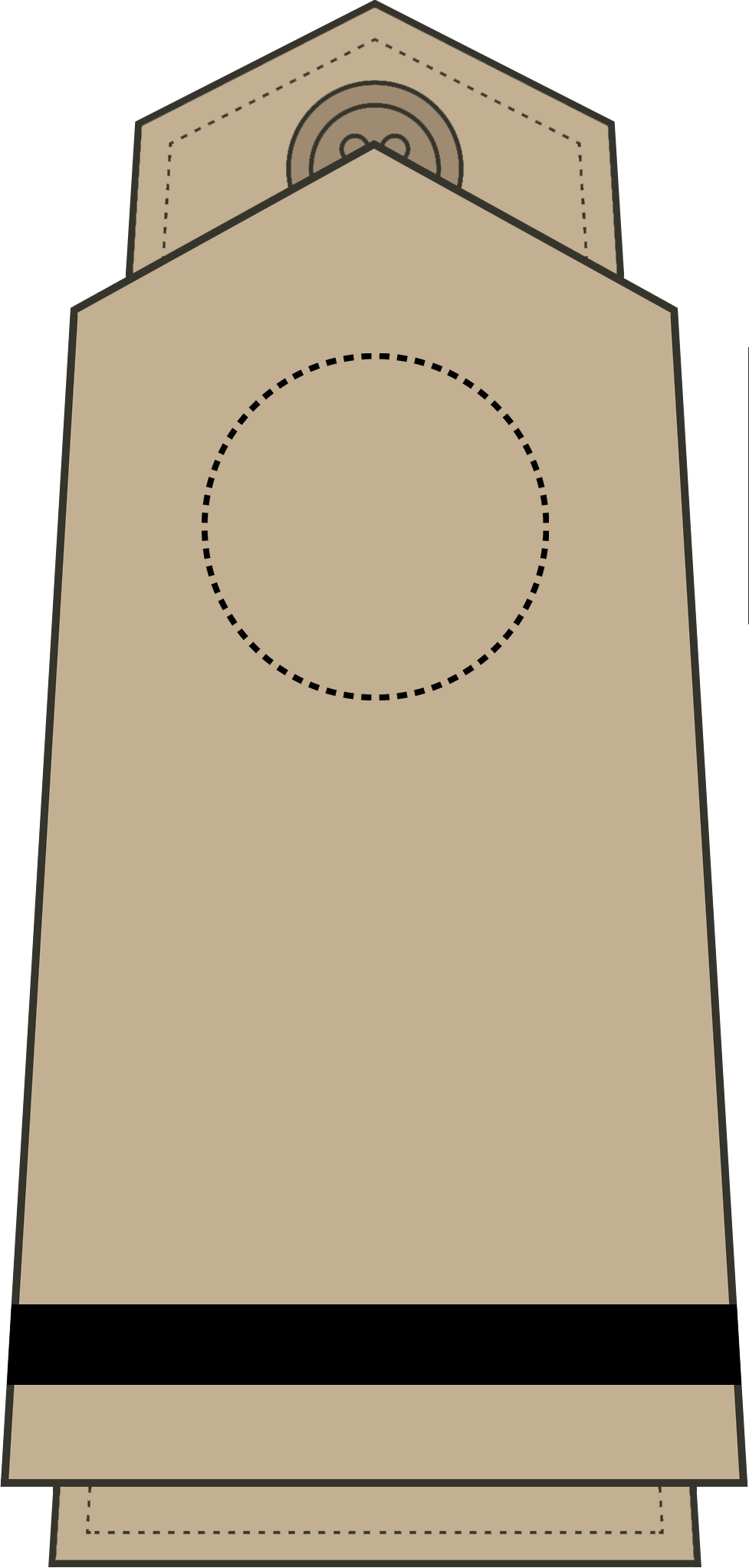
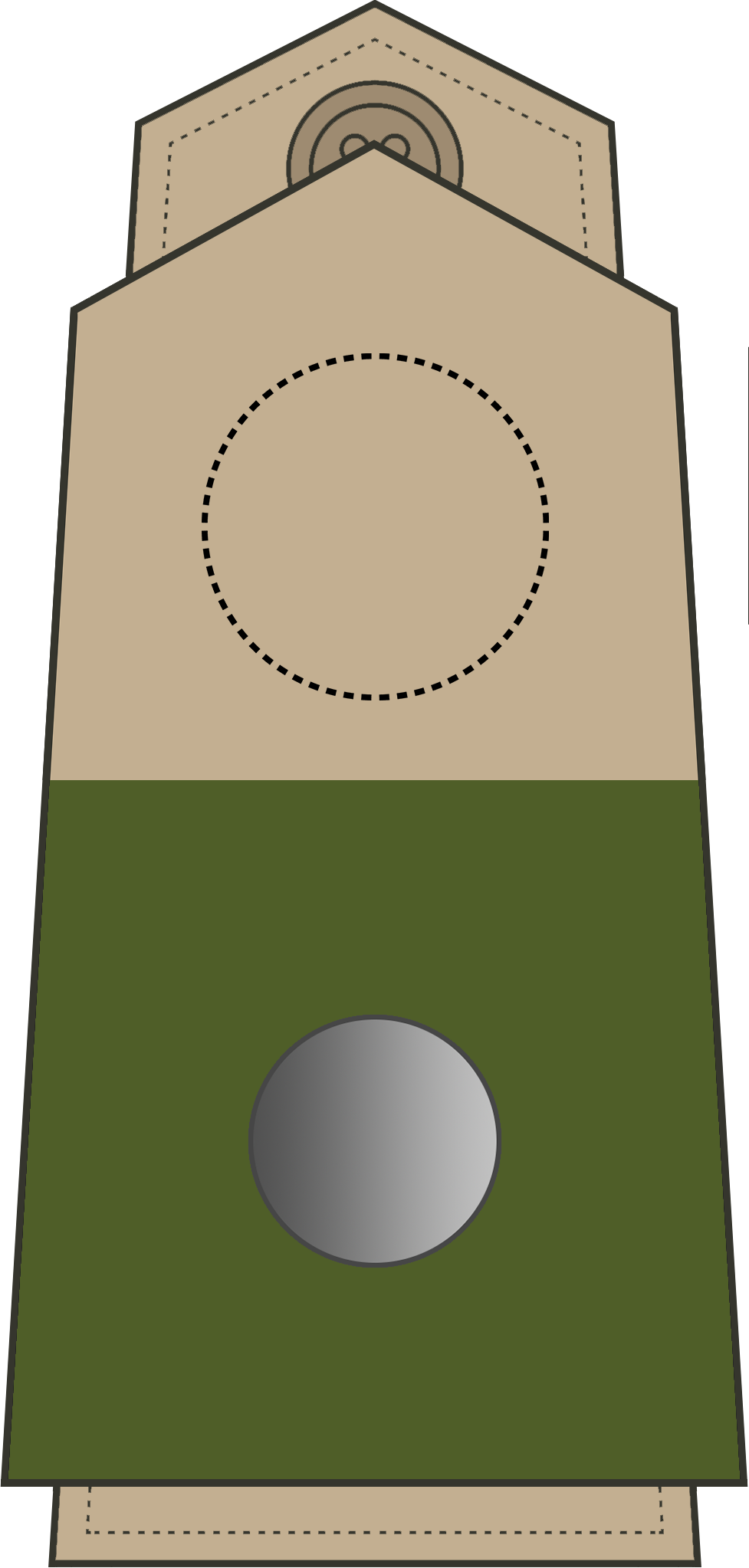
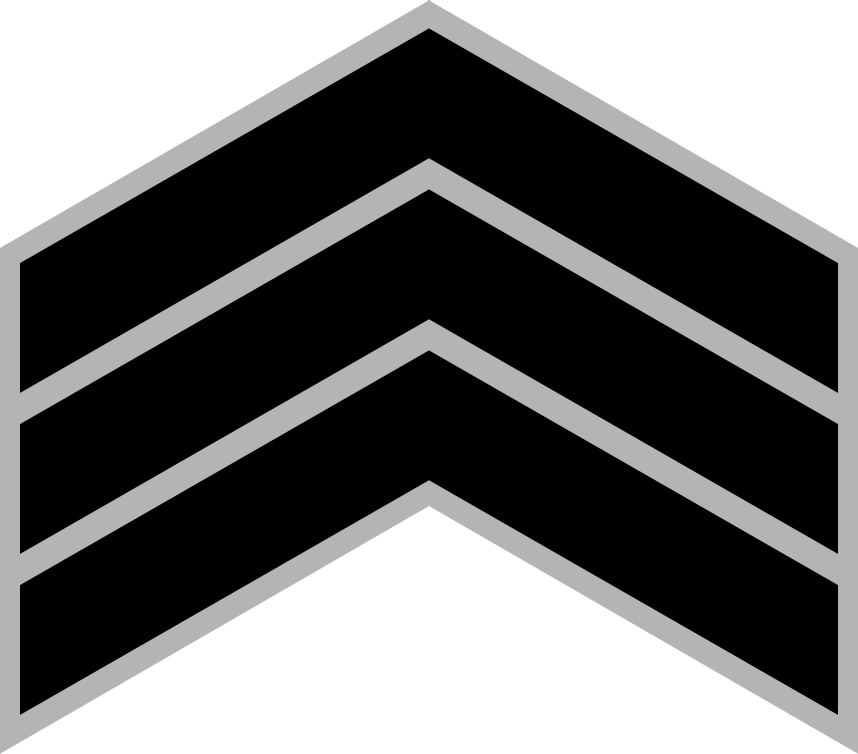
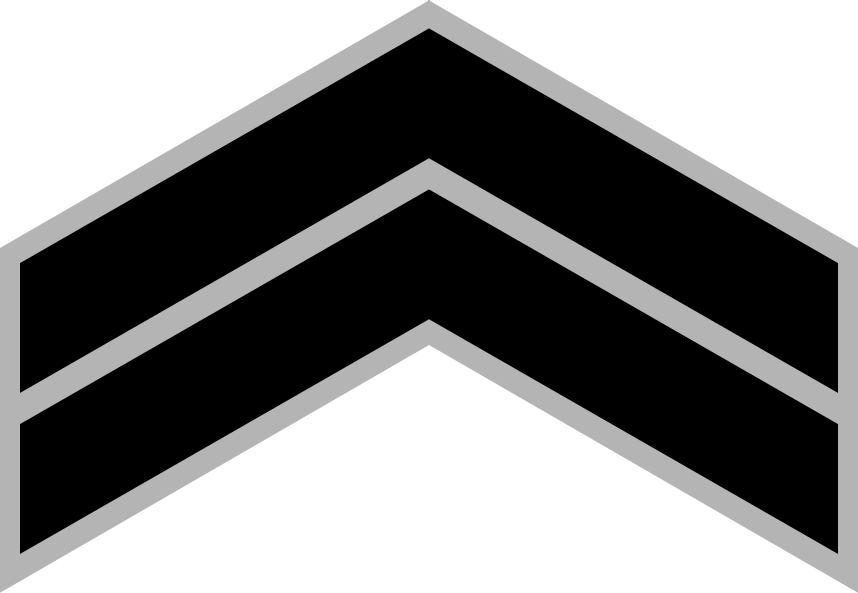
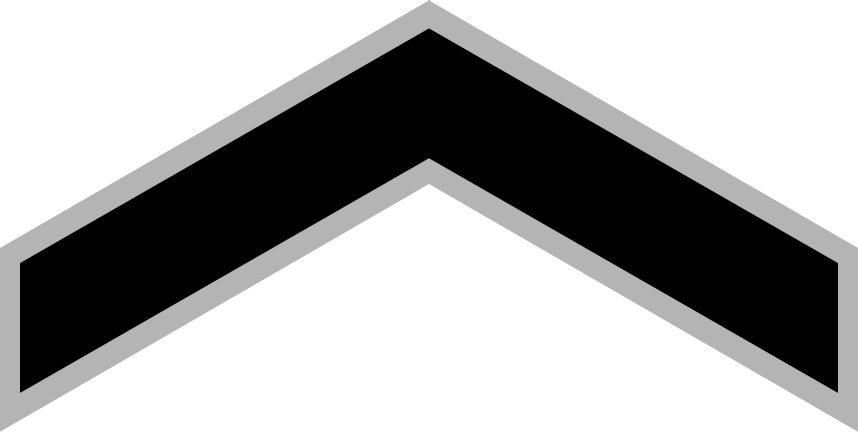
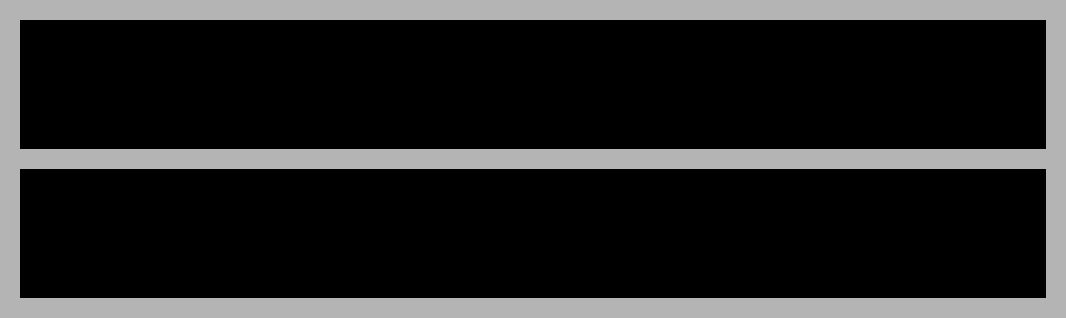
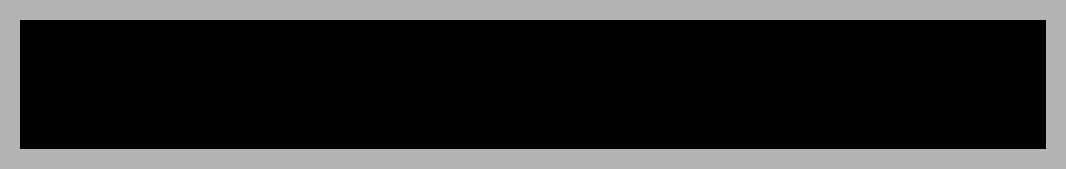
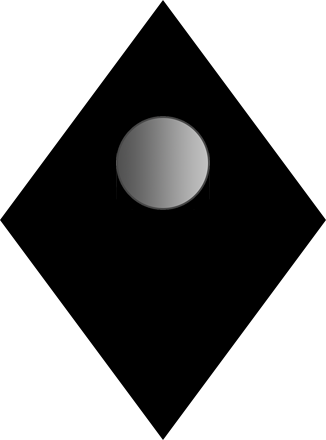
1945-1949
Rank group	Senior NCOs			Junior NCOs	Enlisted
Rank	Letnan Moeda	Sersan Major	Sersan	Kopral	Pradjurit Kelas I	Pradjurit Kelas II
Insignia
1949-1957
Rank	Letnan Moeda	Sersan Major	Sersan	Kopral	Pradjurit Kelas I	Pradjurit Kelas II
Insignia Full dress uniform
Insignia Service dress uniform
Insignia Combat uniform

==== Indonesian Navy ====
===== Commissioned officers =====
The following were the rank insignia of commissioned officers.

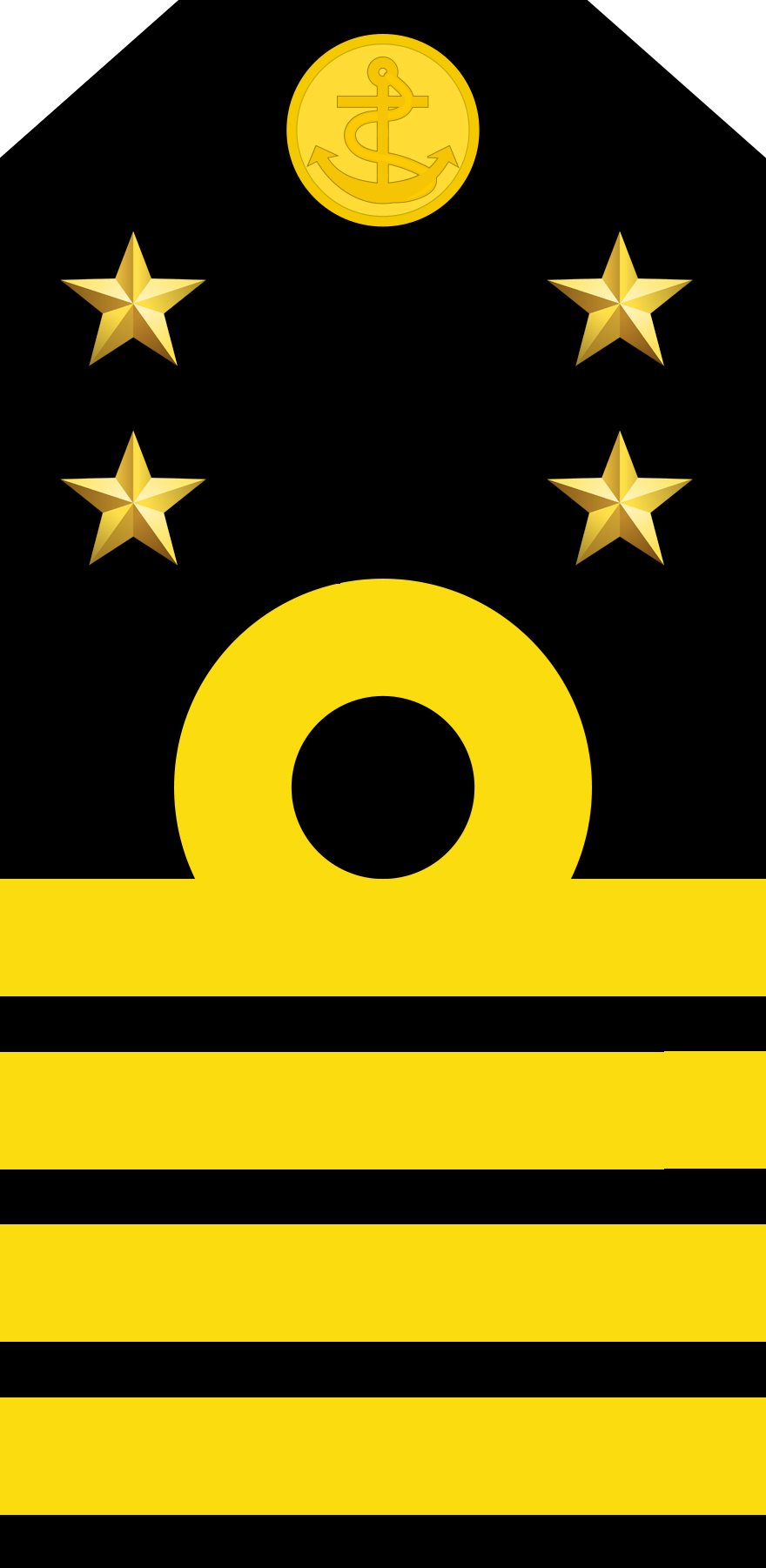
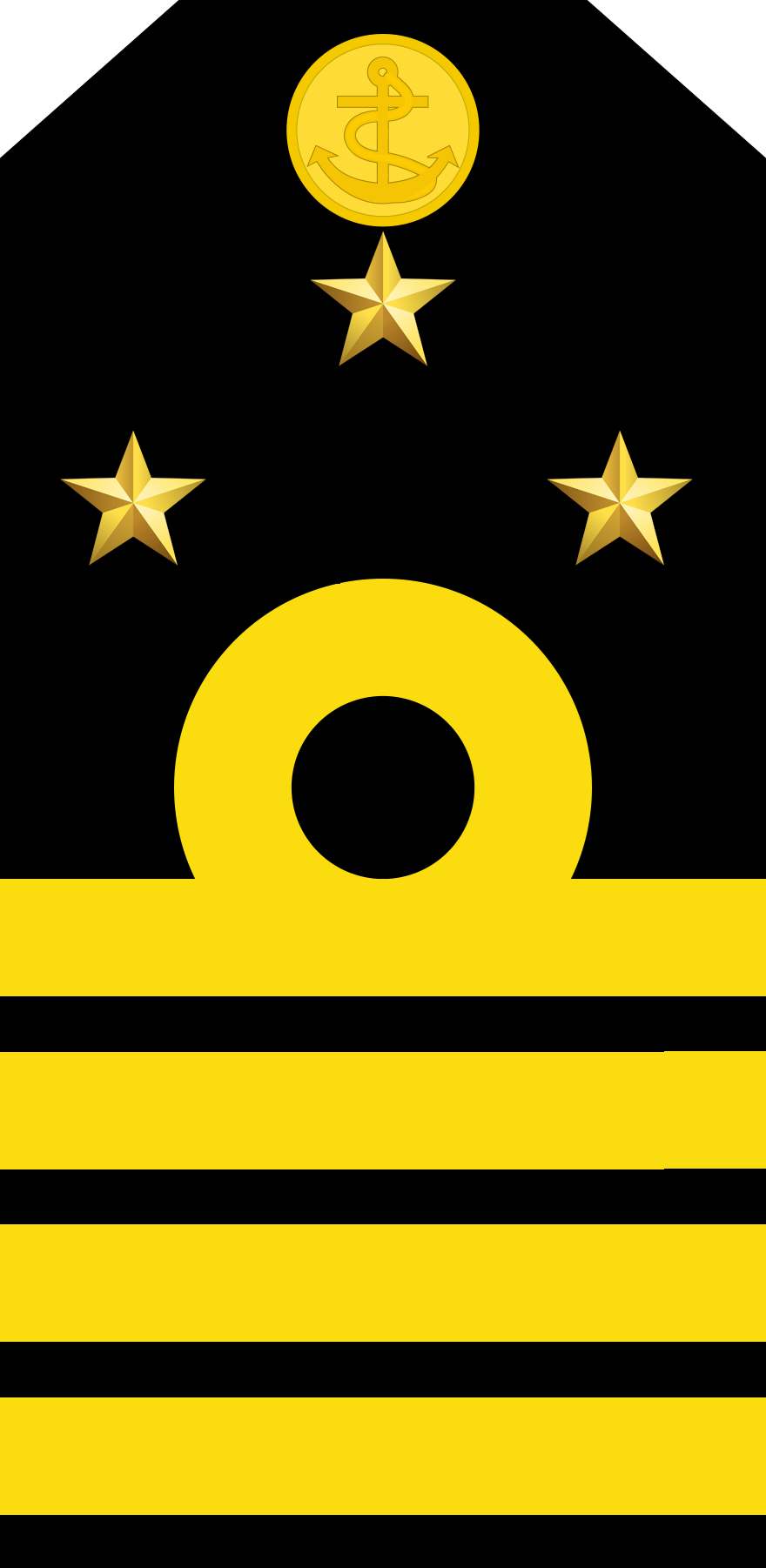
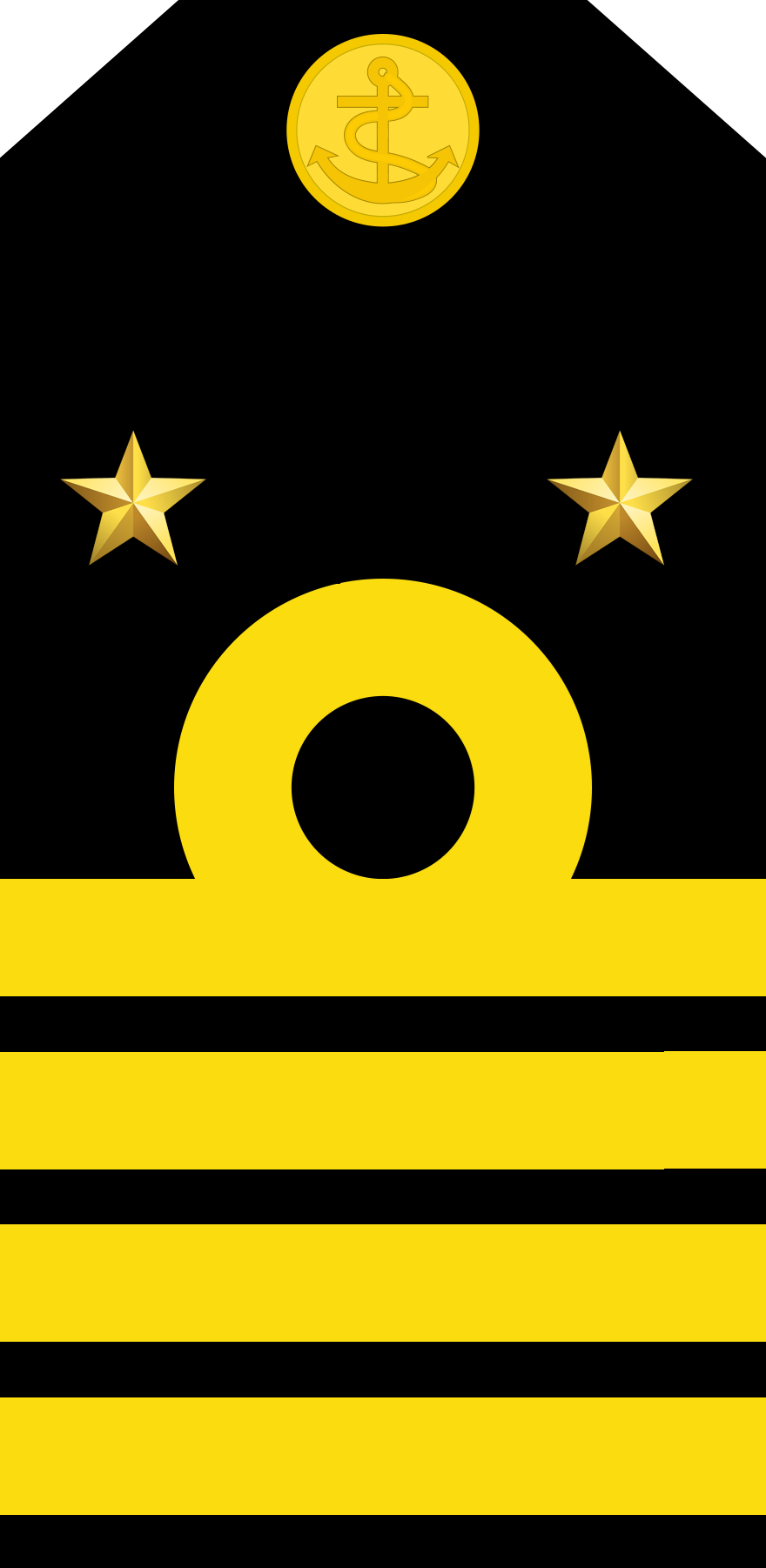
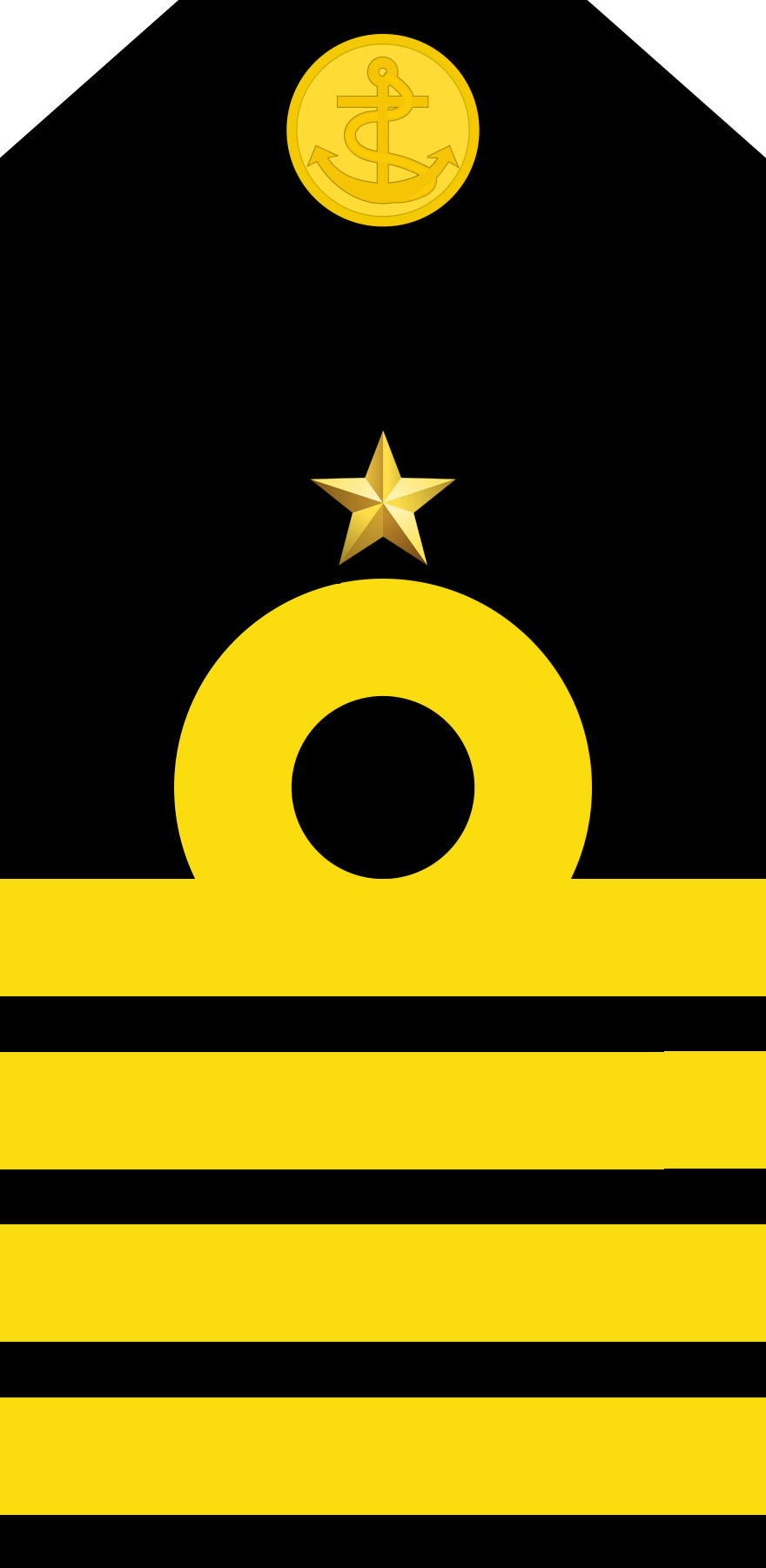
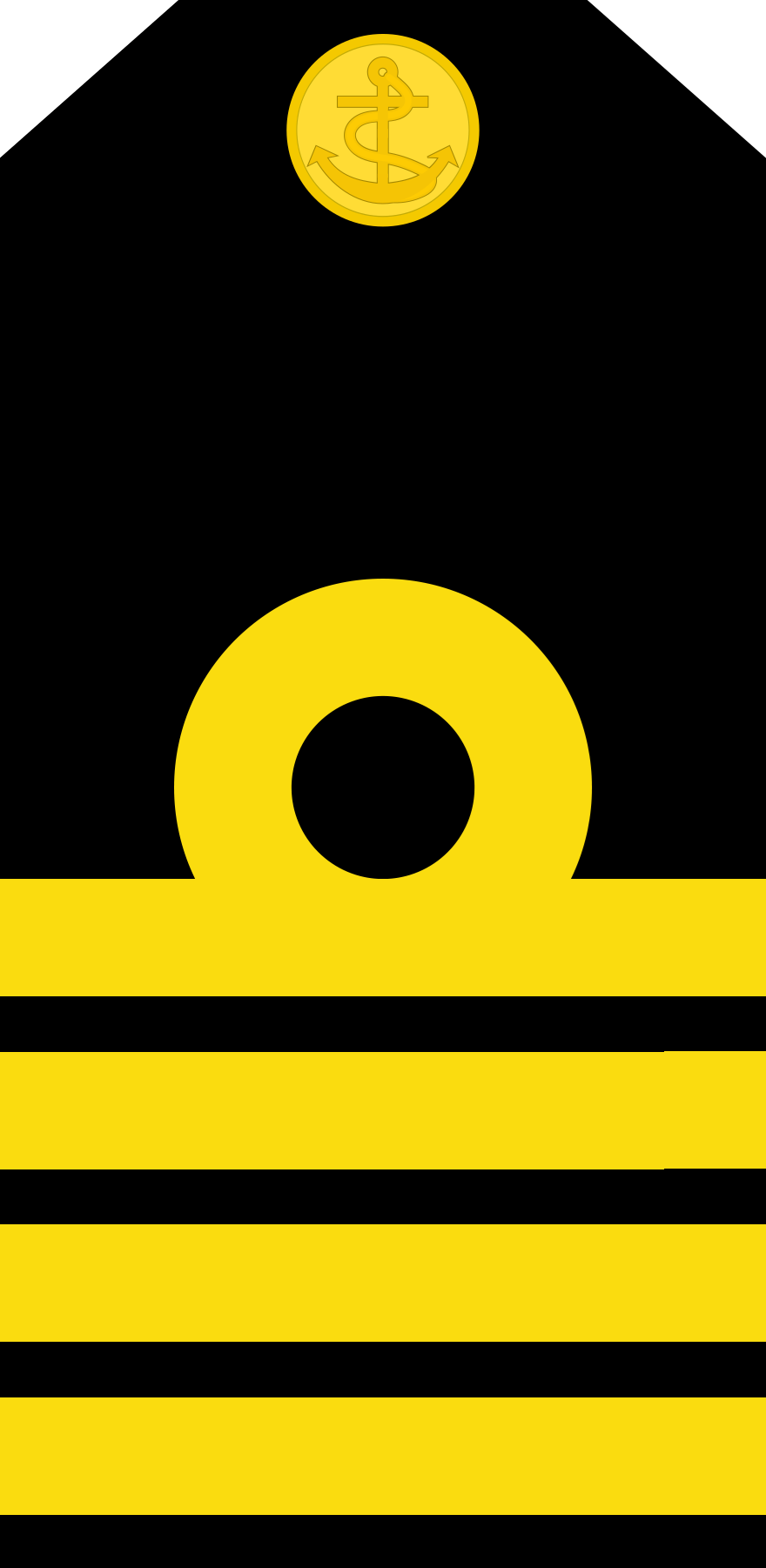
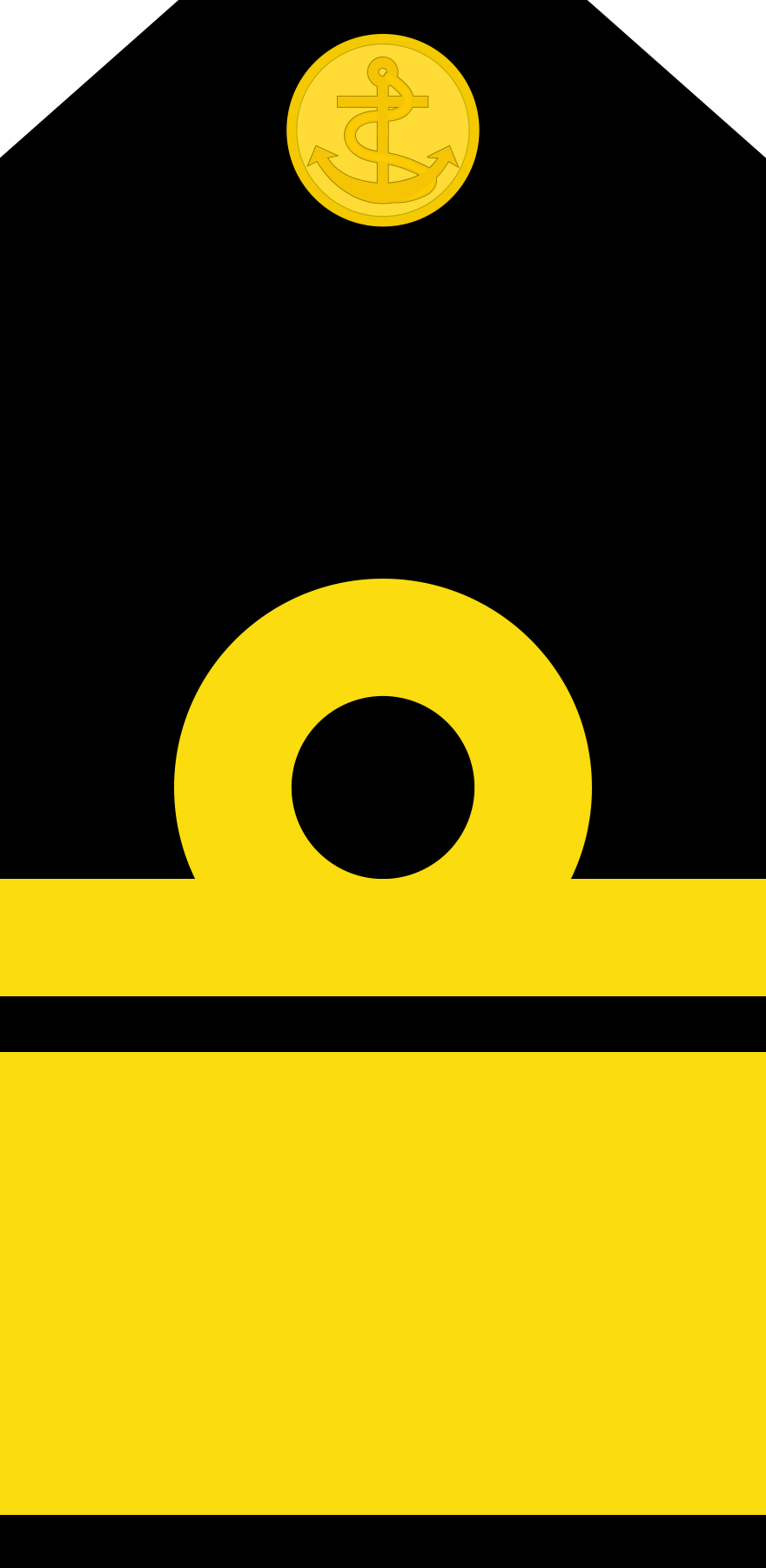
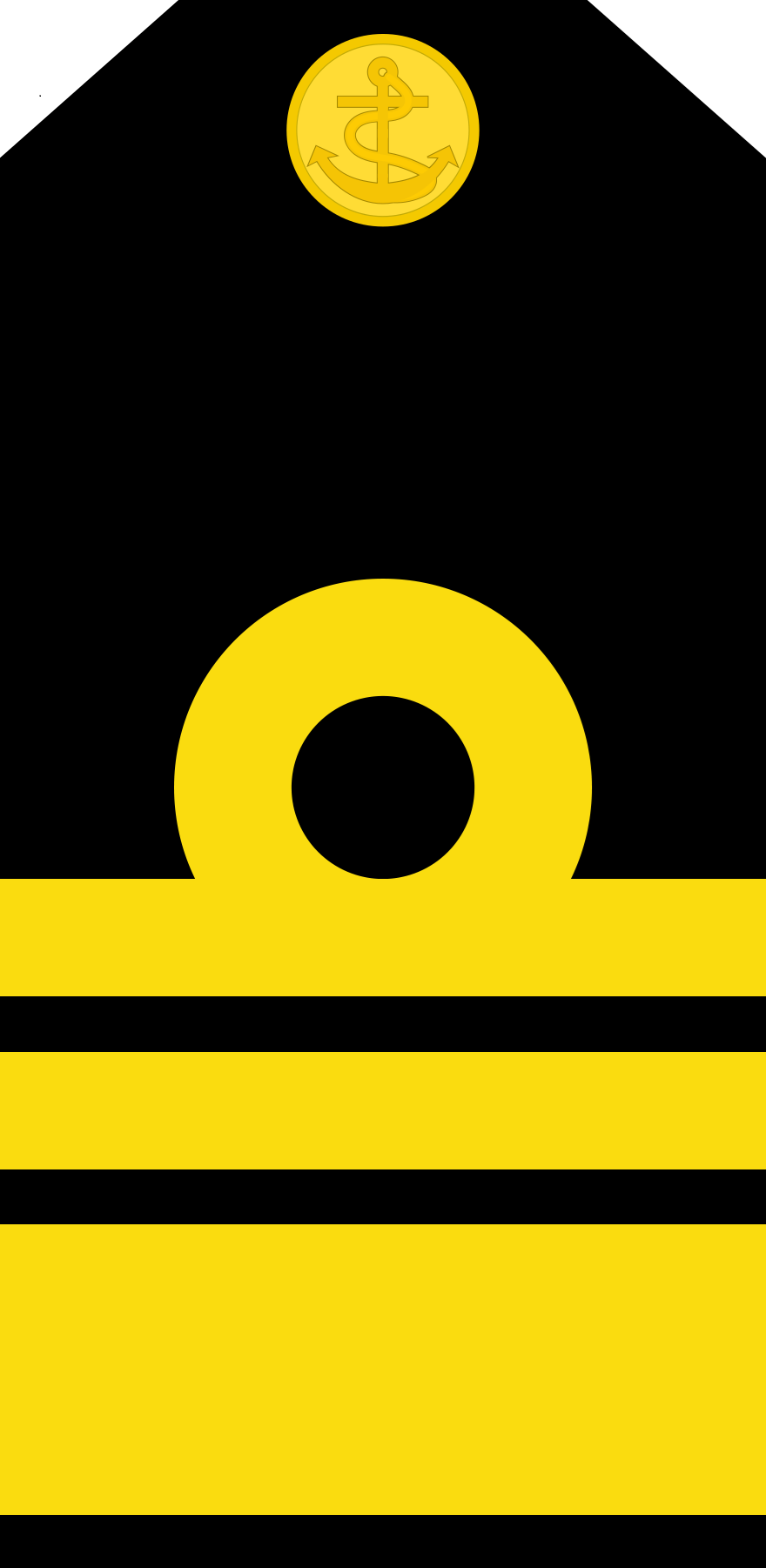
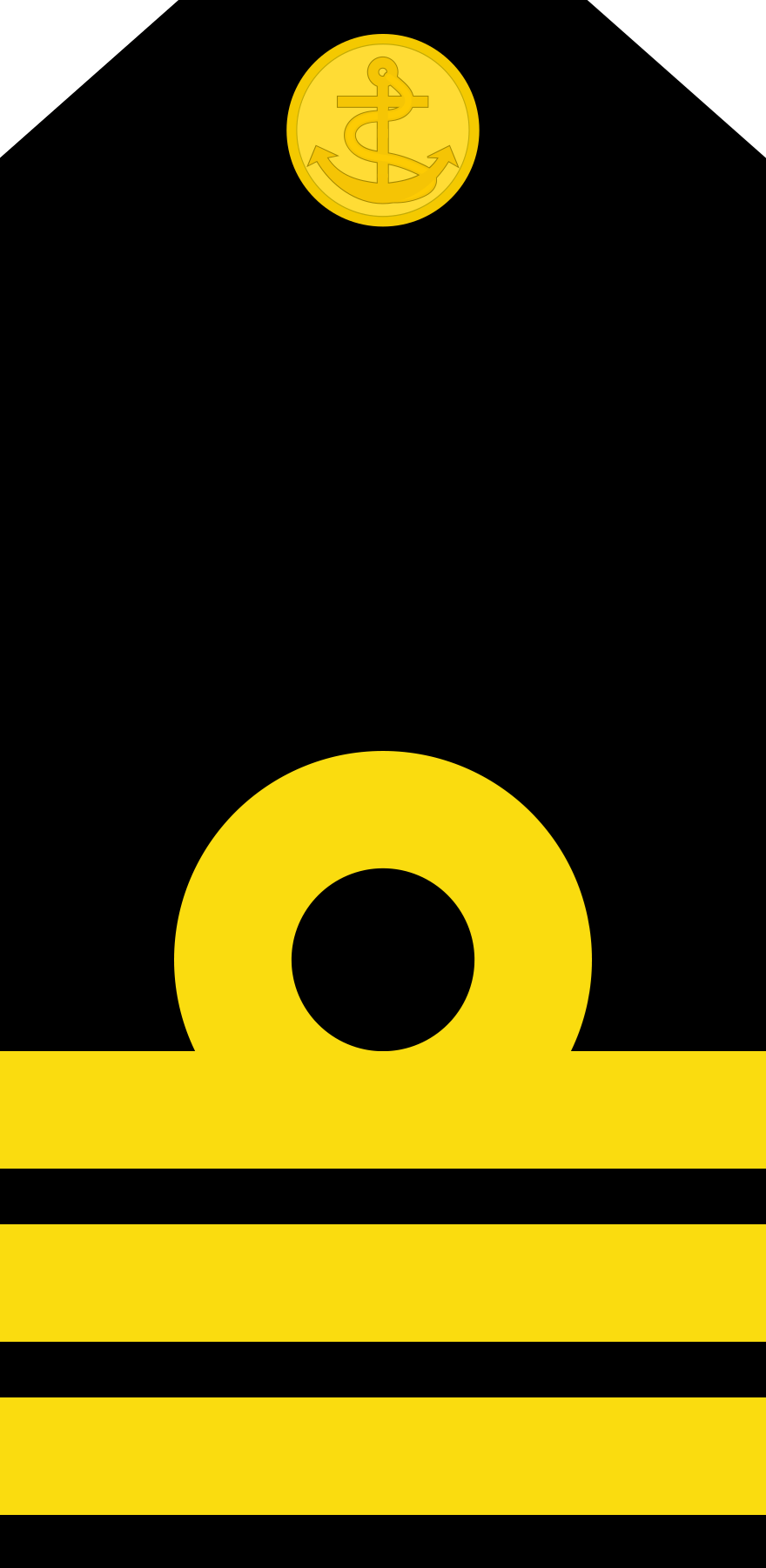
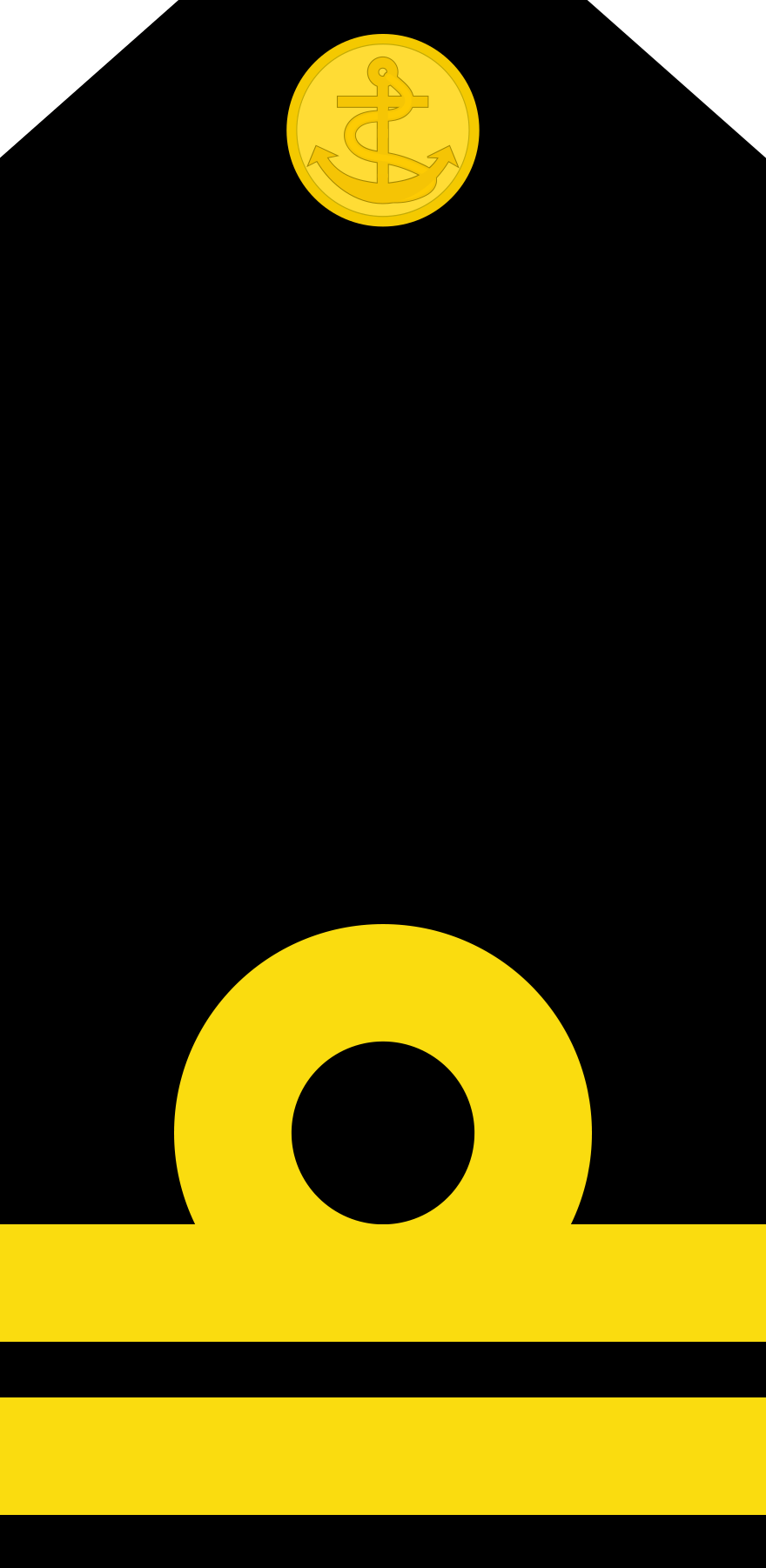
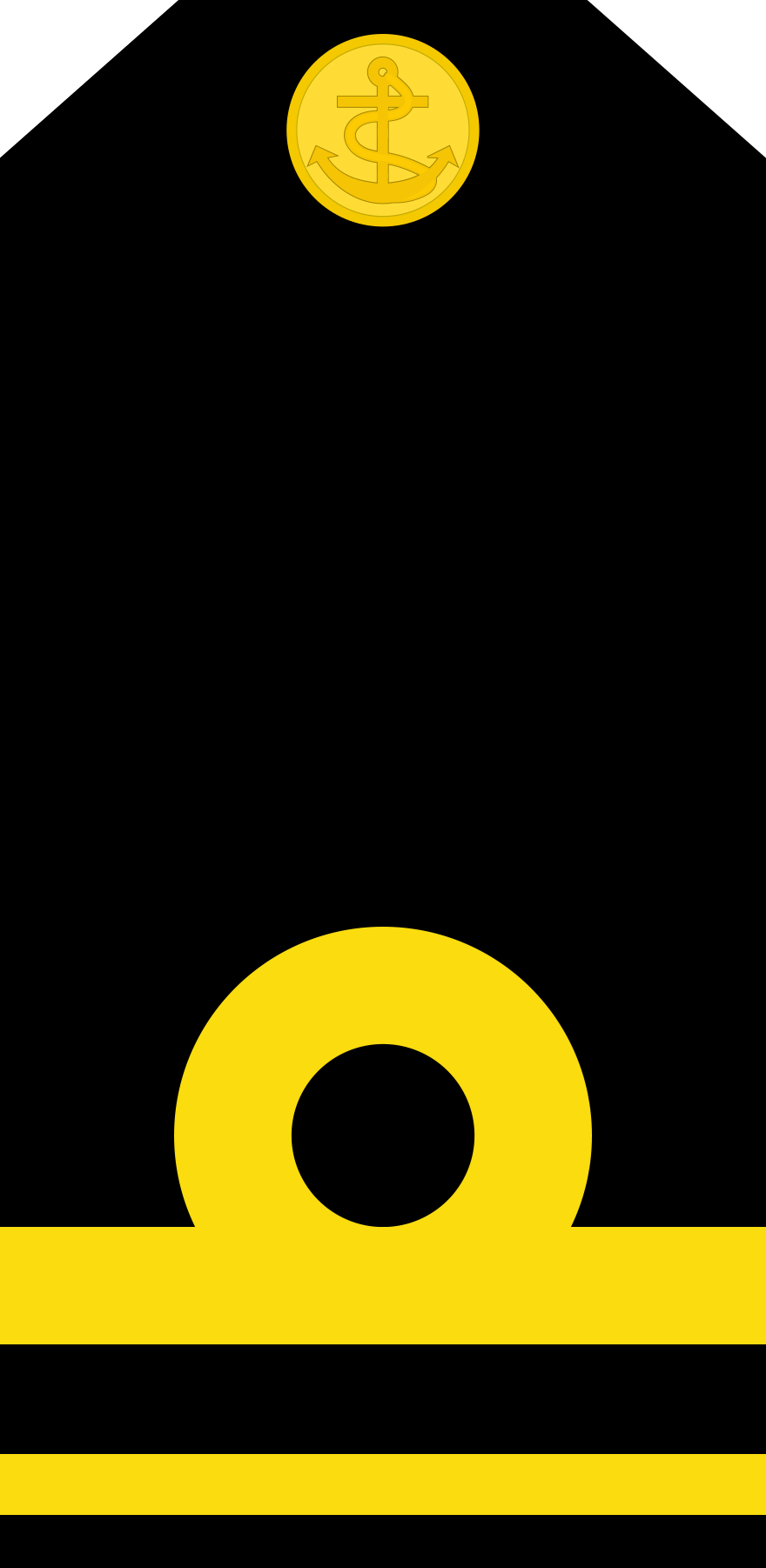
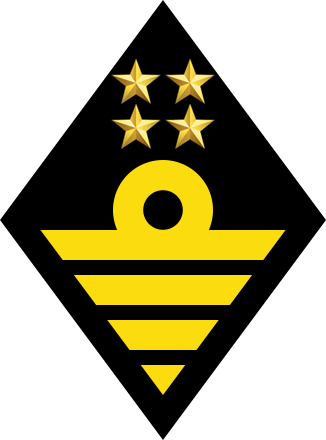
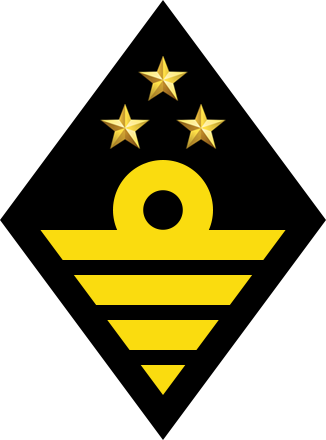
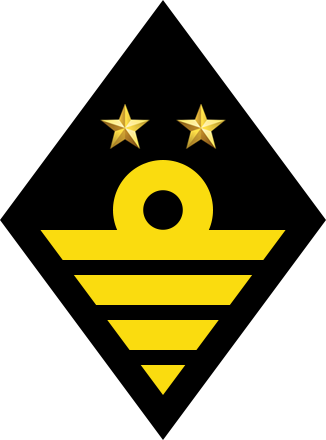
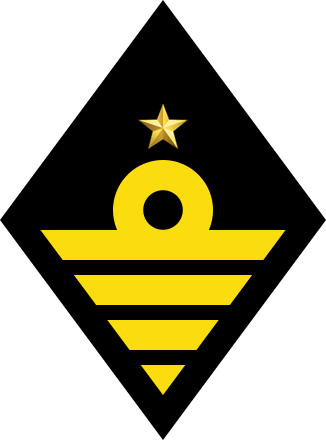
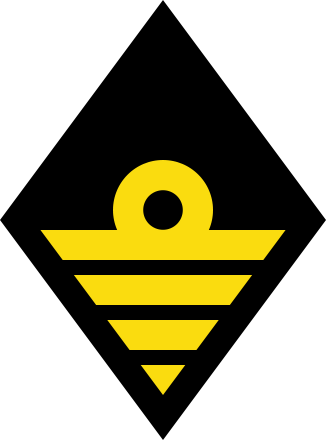
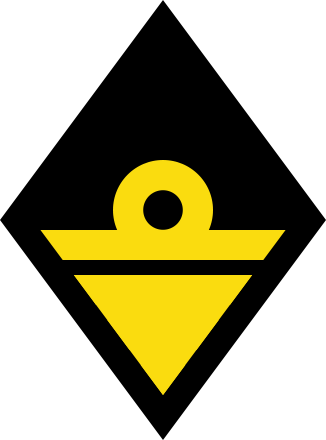
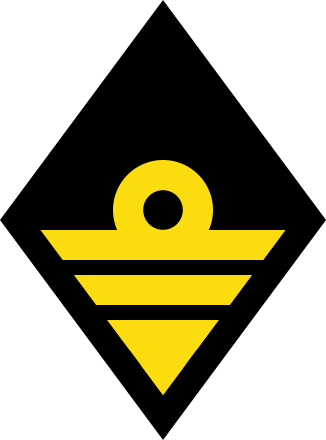
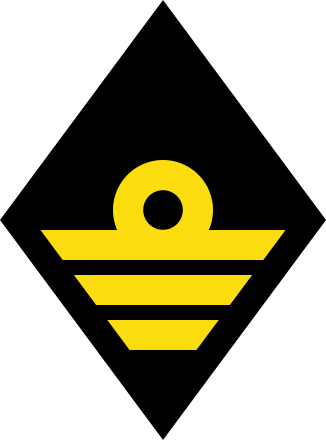
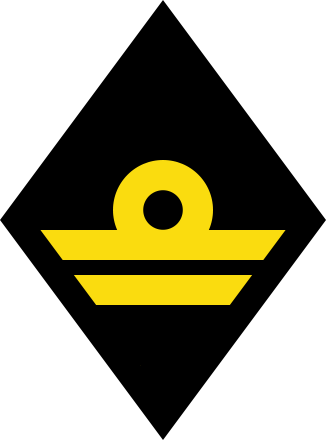
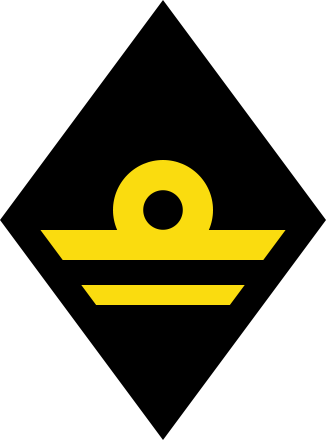
1945-1950
Rank group	General officers				Field officers			Junior officers
Rank	Laksamana Tertinggi	Laksamana Madya	Laksamana Moeda	Laksamana III	Kolonel laoet	Letnan Kolonel laoet	Major laoet	Kapten laoet	Pembantoe Letnan laoet	Letnan laoet
Insignia Full dress uniform and Service dress uniform
Insignia Service dress uniform and Combat uniform
1950-1957
Rank group	Flag officers				Senior officers			Junior officers
Rank	Laksamana Tertinggi	Laksamana Besar	Laksamana	Laksamana Moeda	Kolonel laoet	Letnan Kolonel laoet	Major laoet	Kapten laoet	Letnan laoet	Letnan Moeda laoet
Insignia Full dress uniform
Insignia Service dress uniform

===== Enlisted ratings =====
The rank insignia of non-commissioned officers and enlisted personnels.

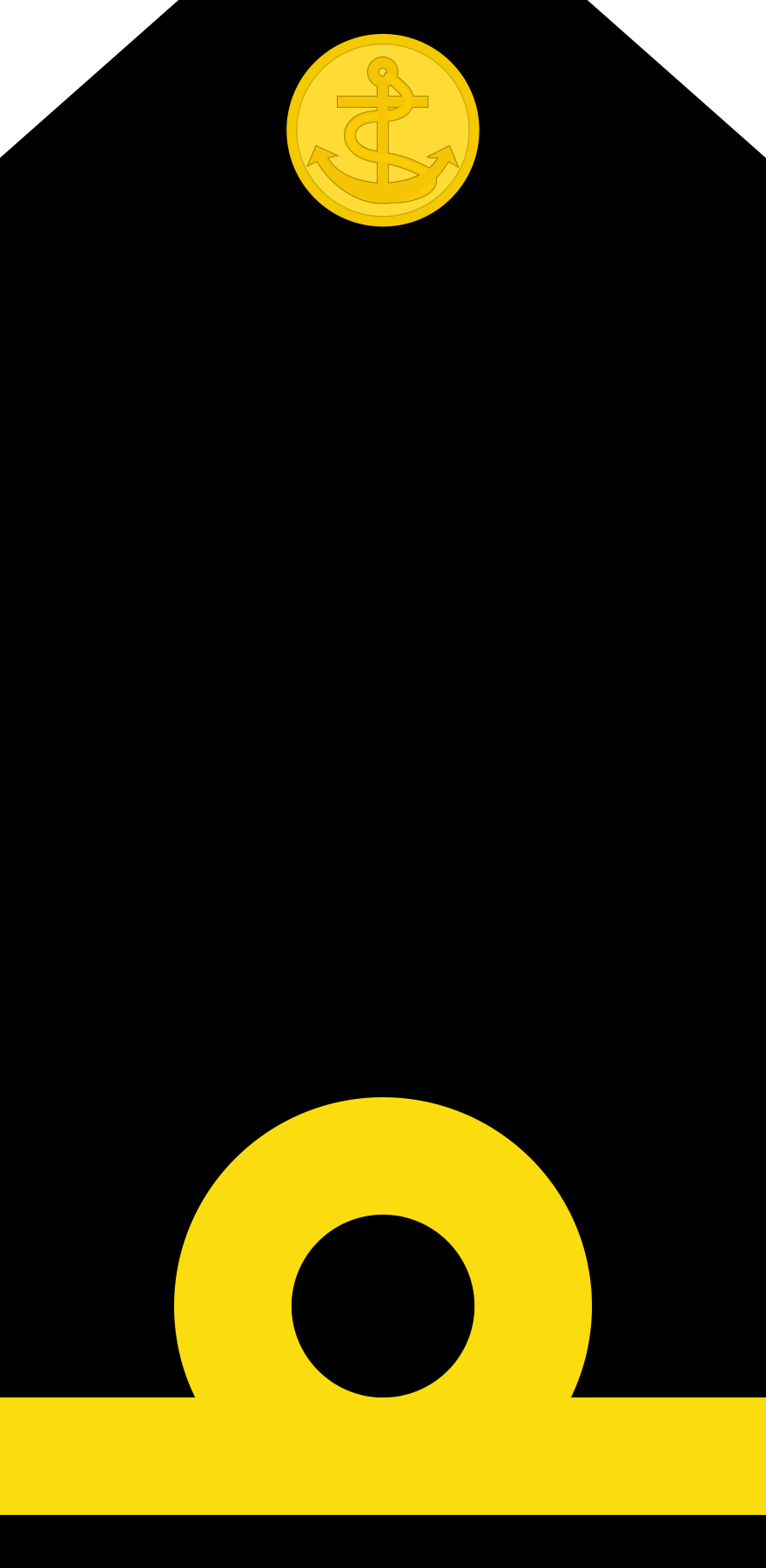
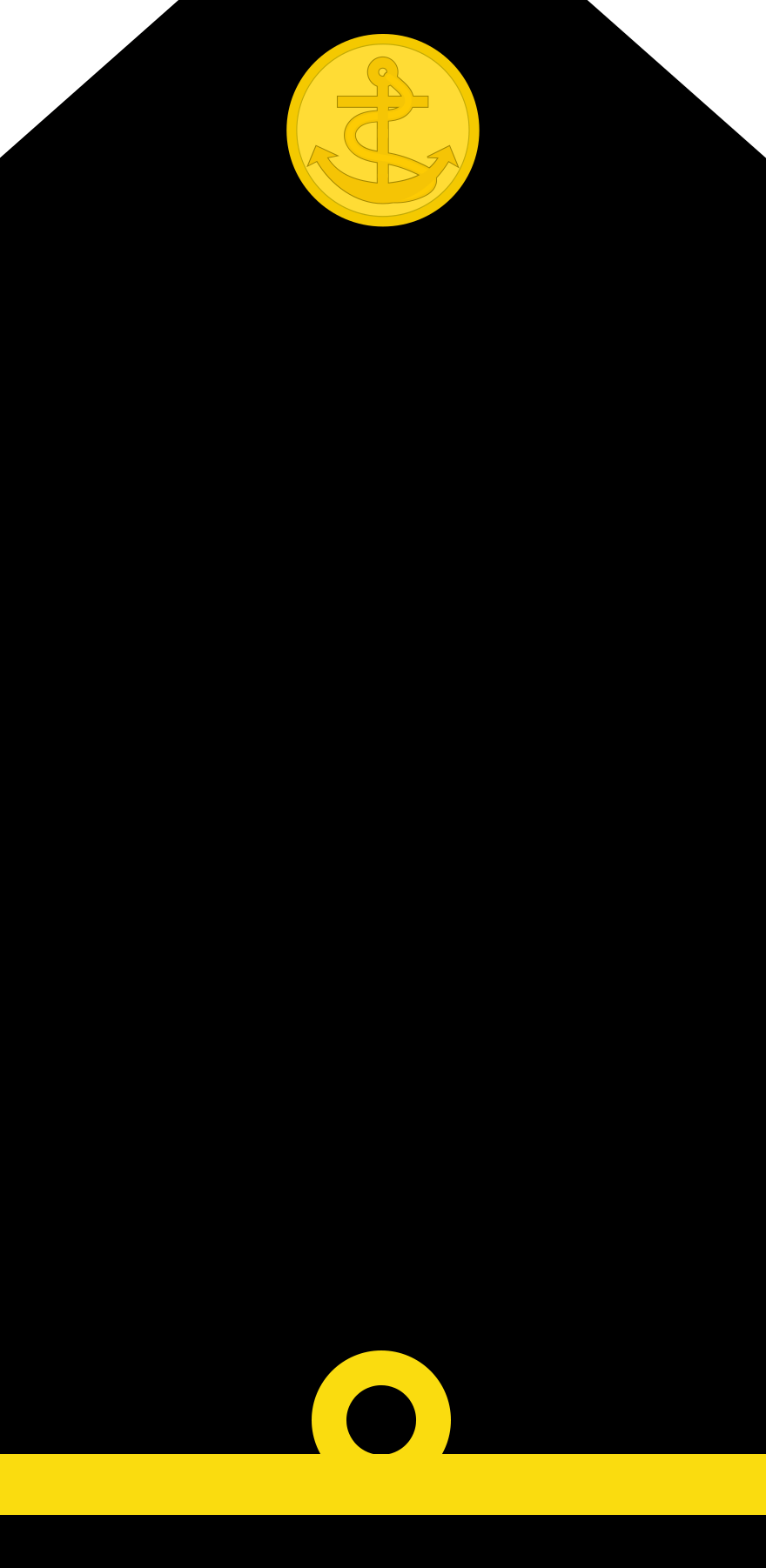
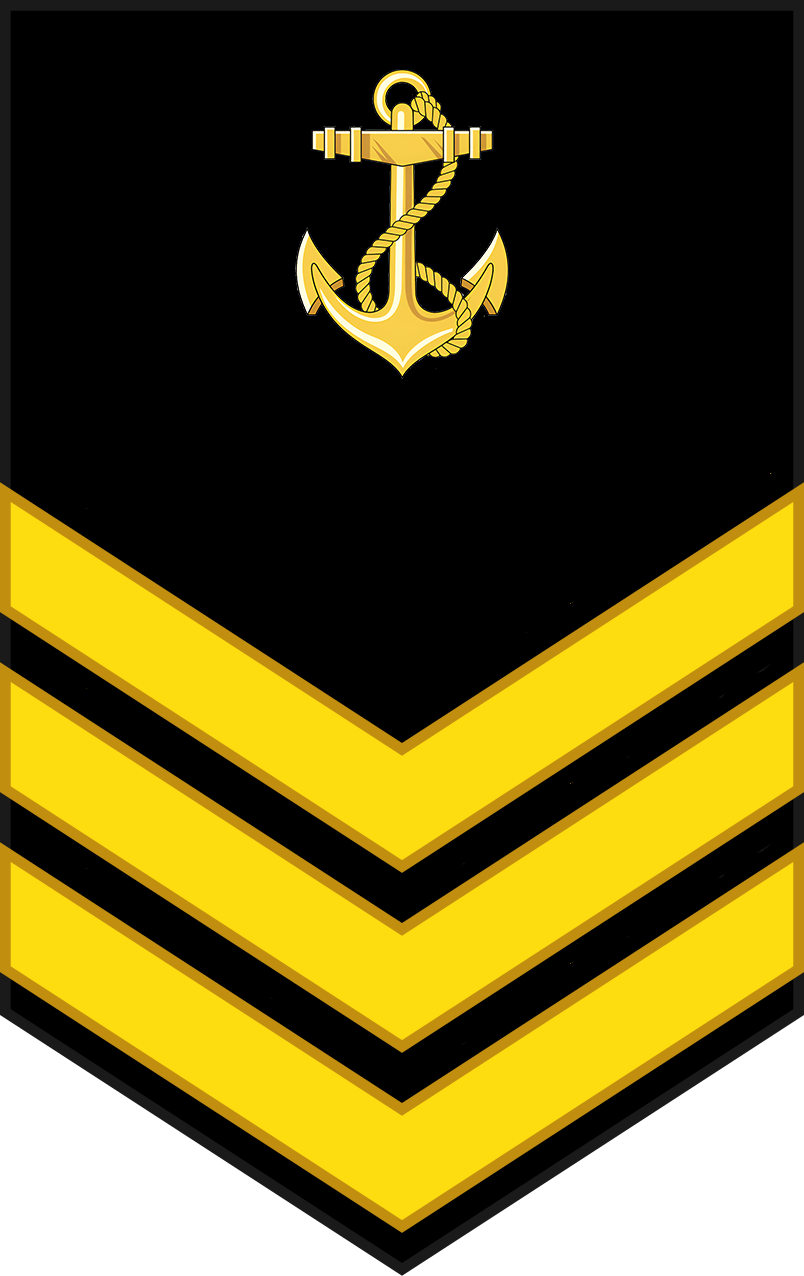
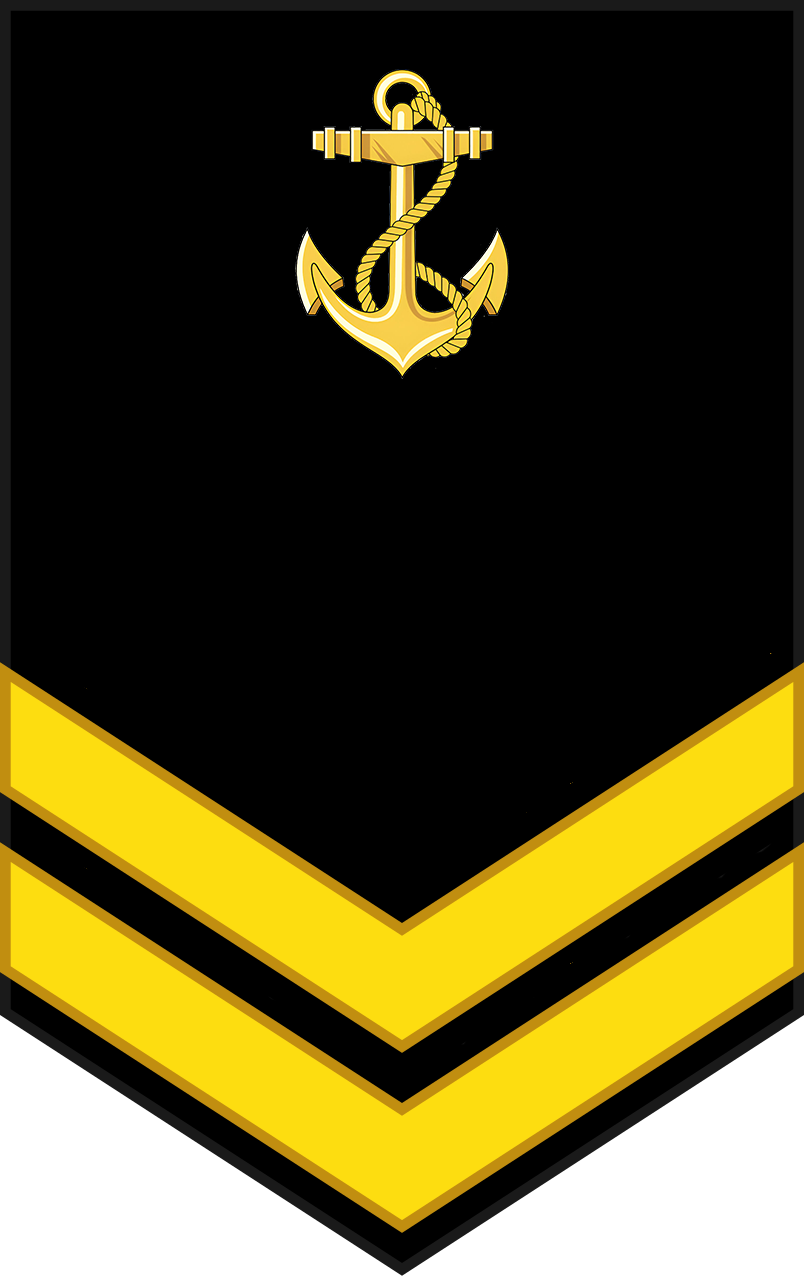
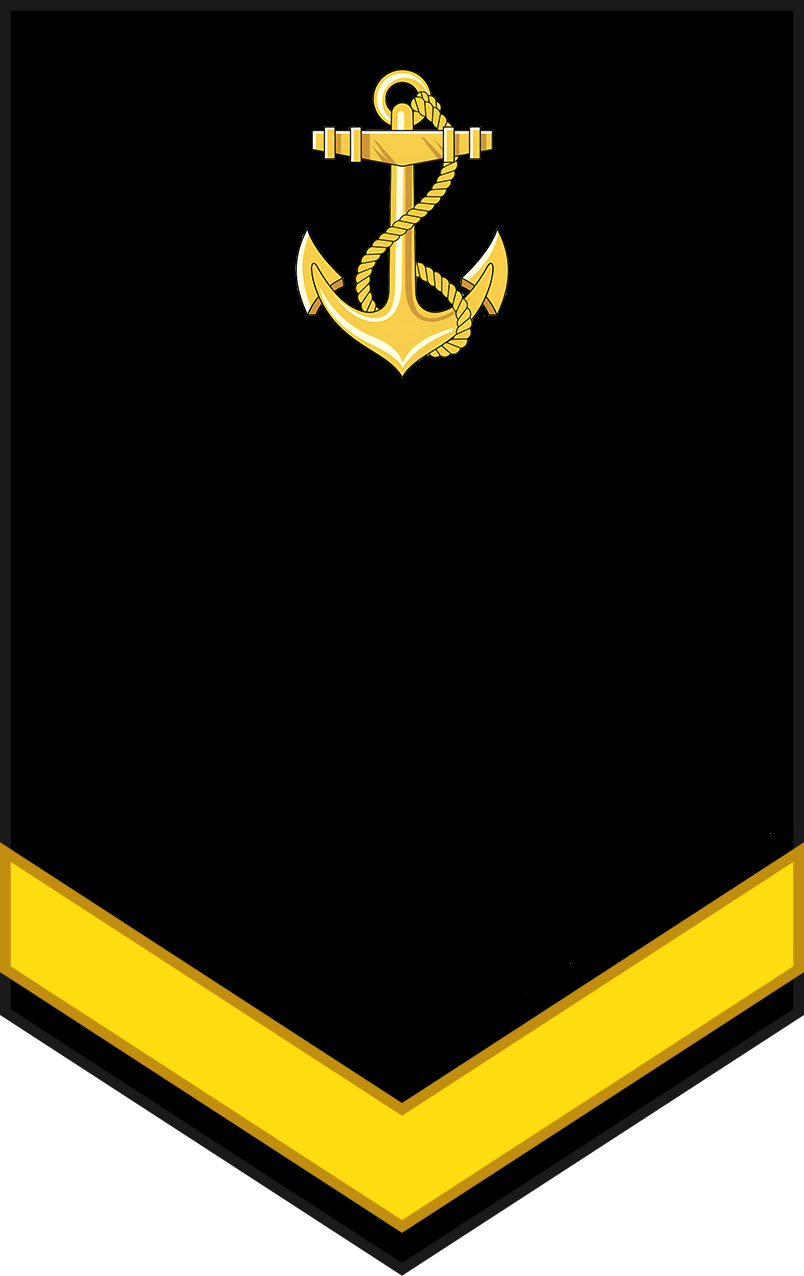
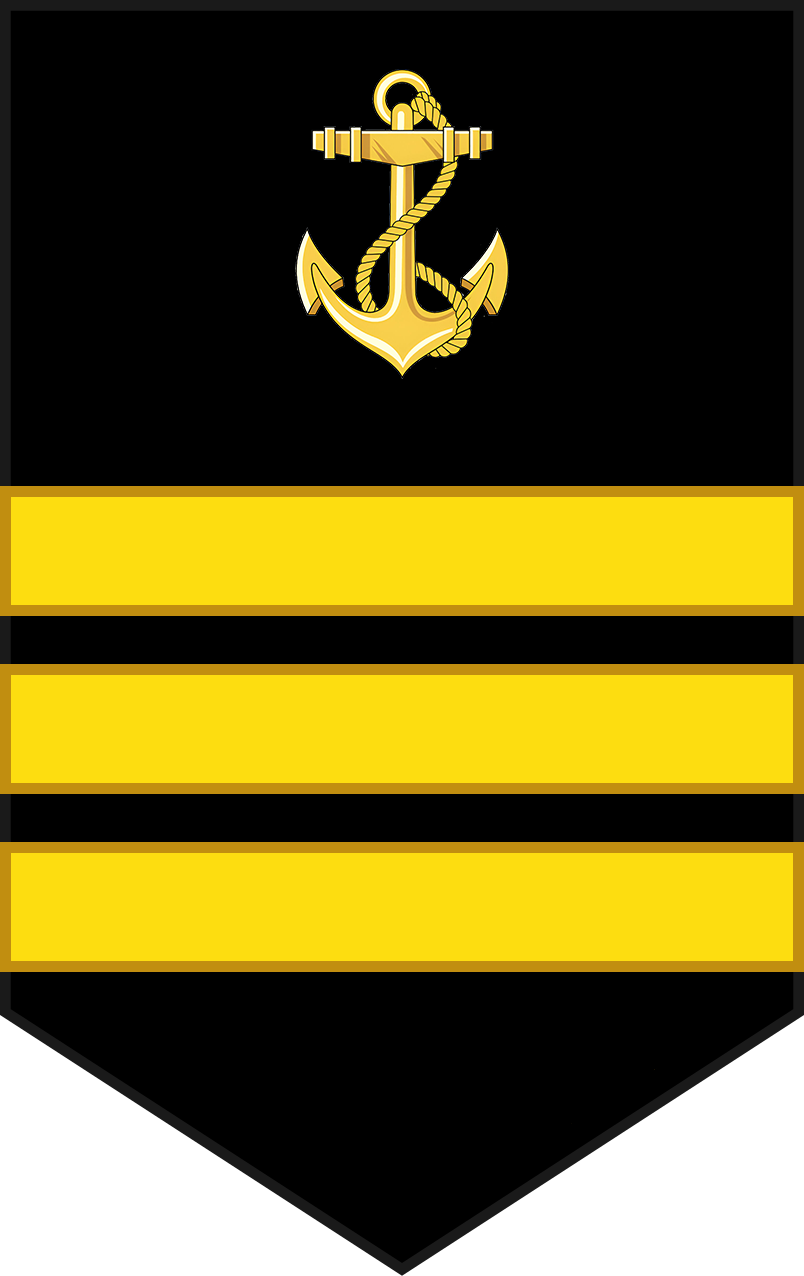
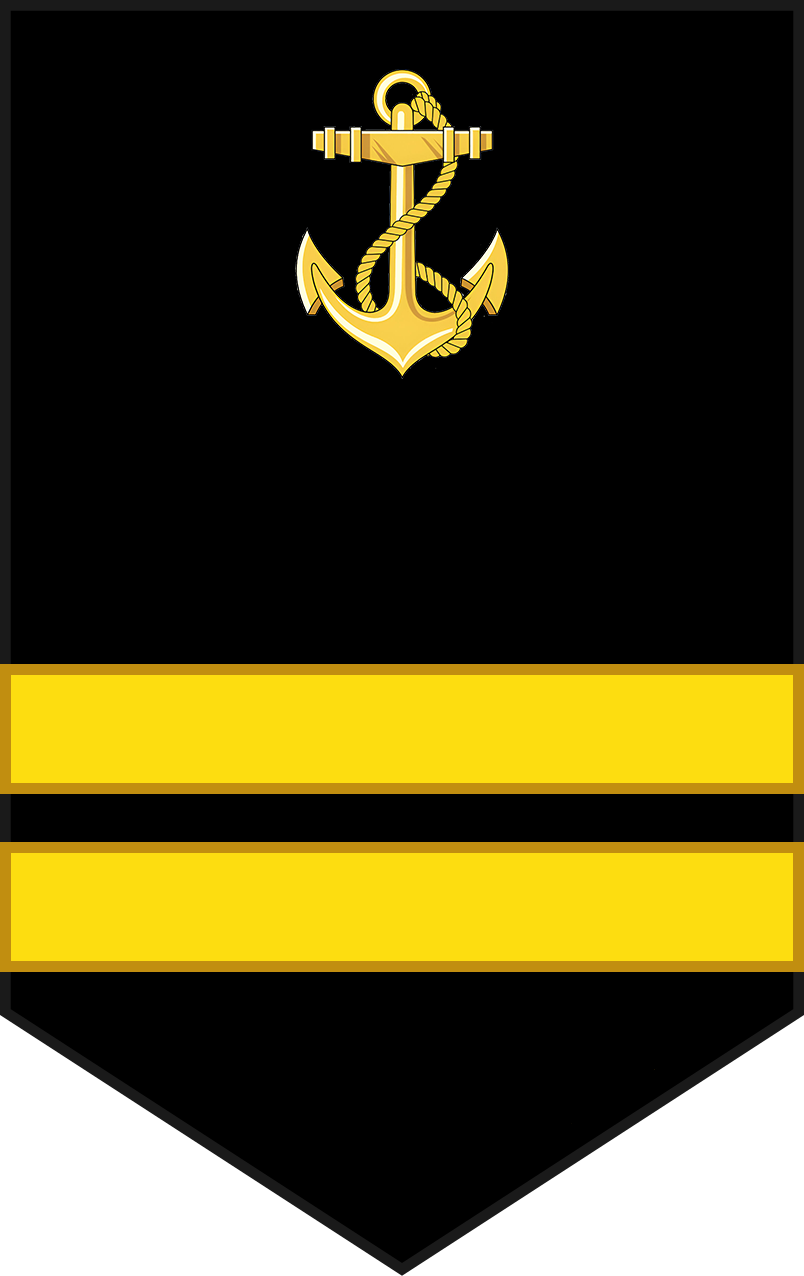
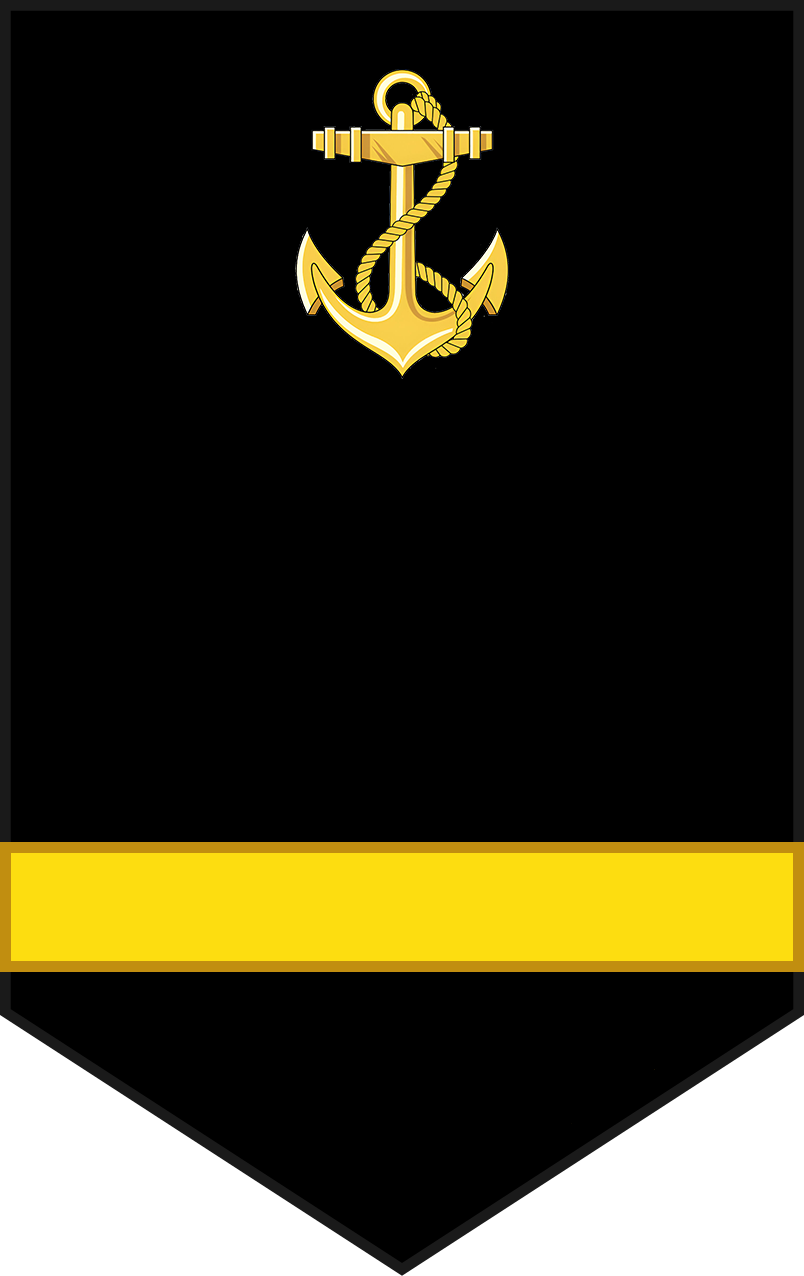
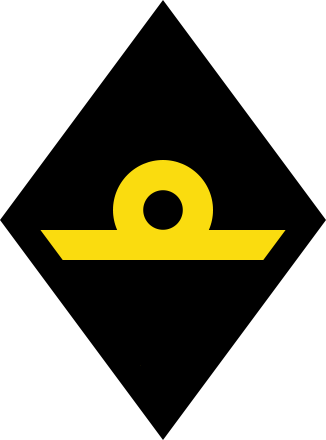
1945-1950
Rank group	Senior NCOs				Junior NCOs	Enlisted
Rank	Tjalon Letnan laoet	Ajudan Opsir Rendah	Sersan Major laoet	Sersan laoet	Kopral laoet	Kelasi I	Kelasi II	Kelasi III
Insignia Full dress uniform and Service dress uniform
Insignia Service dress uniform and Combat uniform
1950-1957
Rank group	Senior NCOs				Junior NCOs	Enlisted
Rank	Ajudan		Sersan Major laoet	Sersan laoet	Kopral laoet	Kelasi I	Kelasi II
Insignia Service dress uniform and Combat uniform

==== Indonesian Air Forces ====
===== Commissioned officers =====
The following were the rank insignia of commissioned officers.

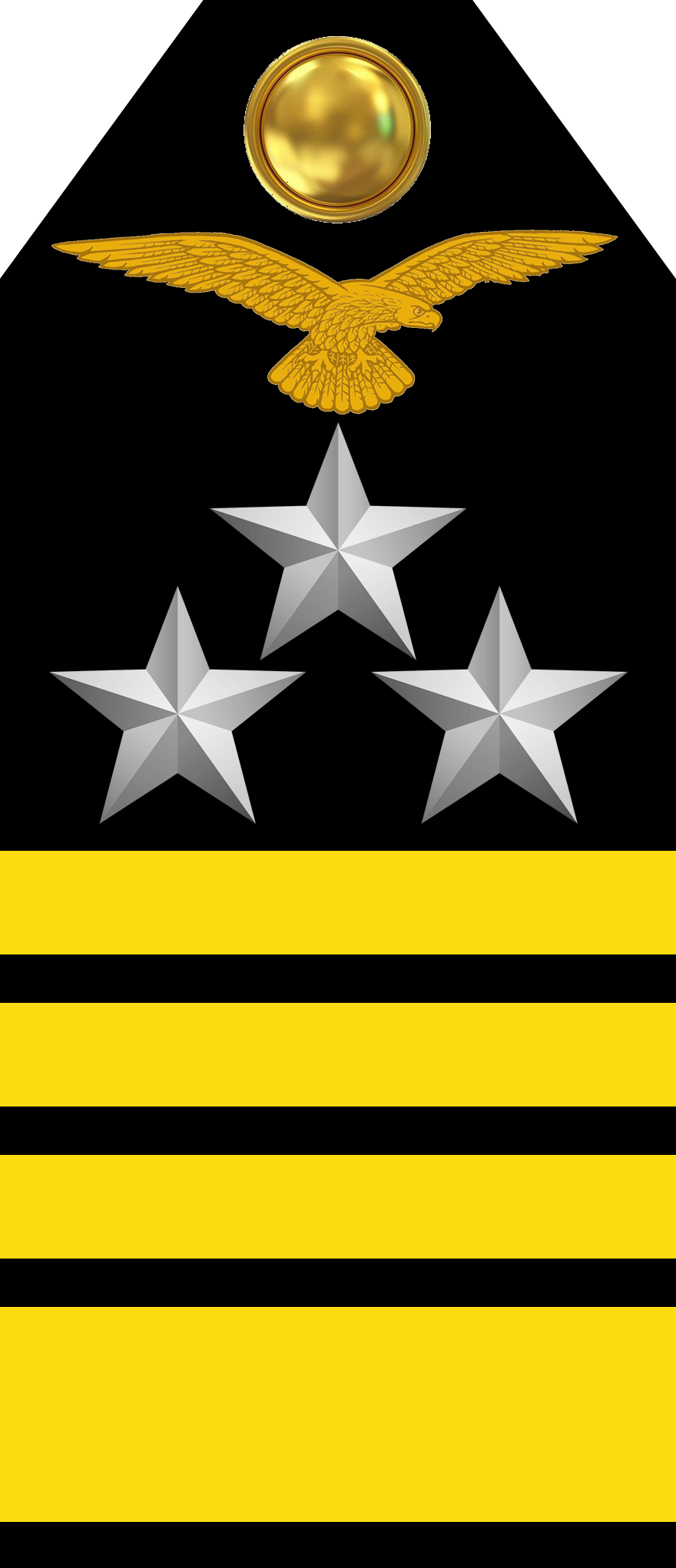
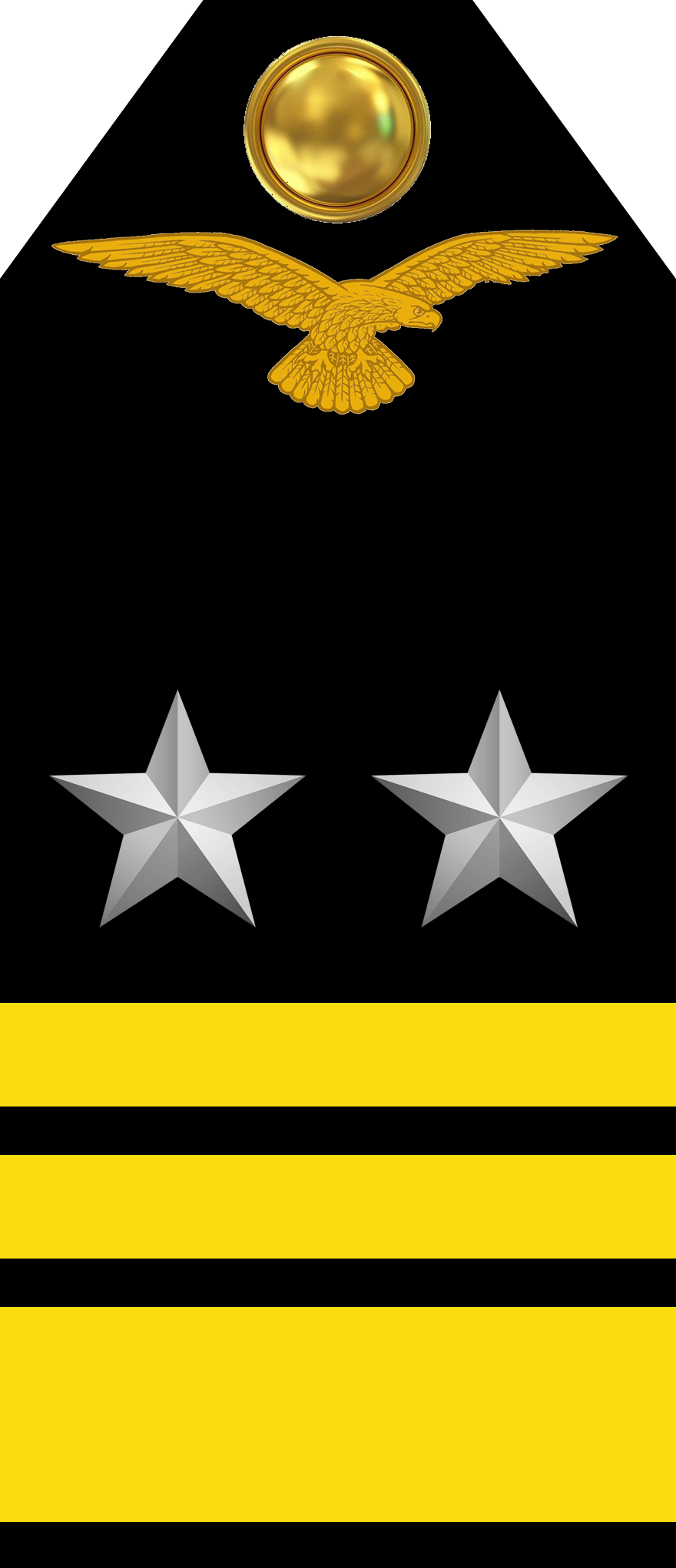
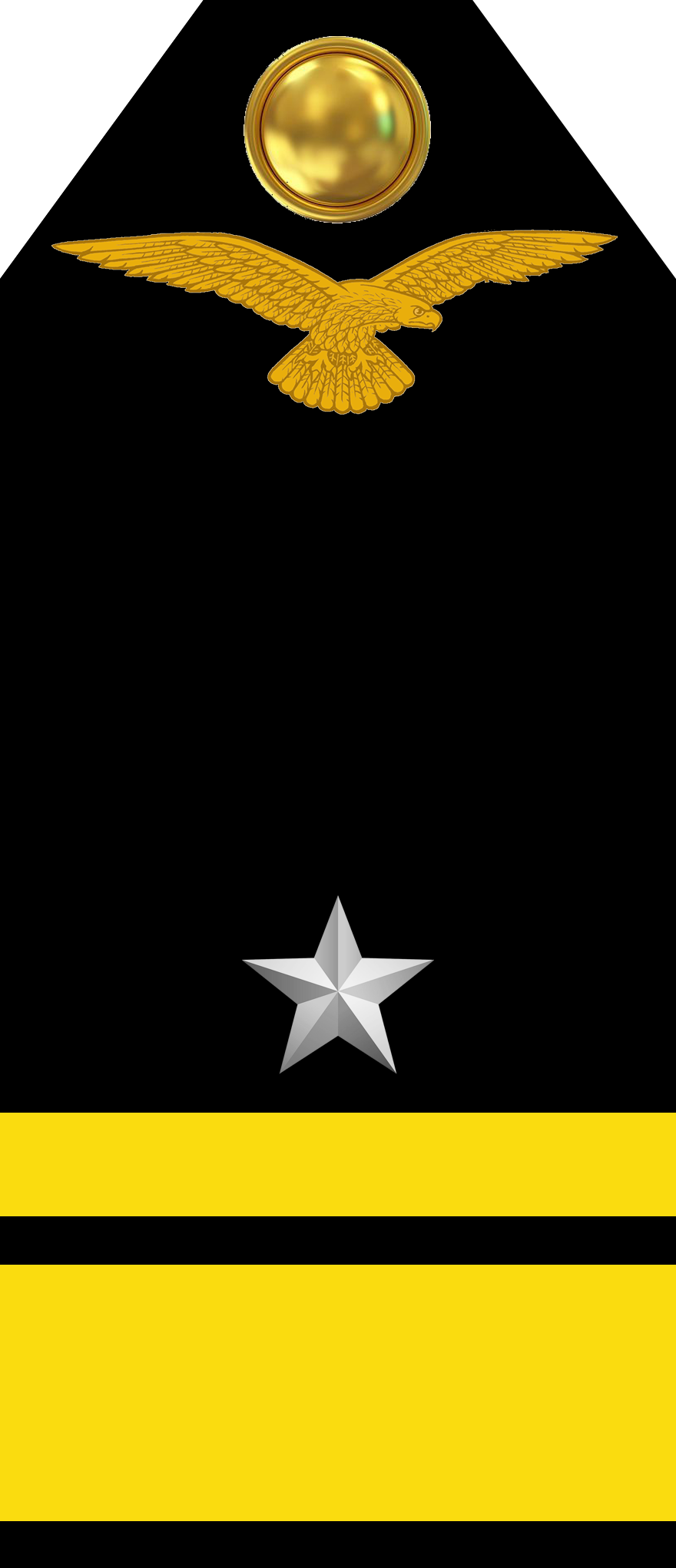
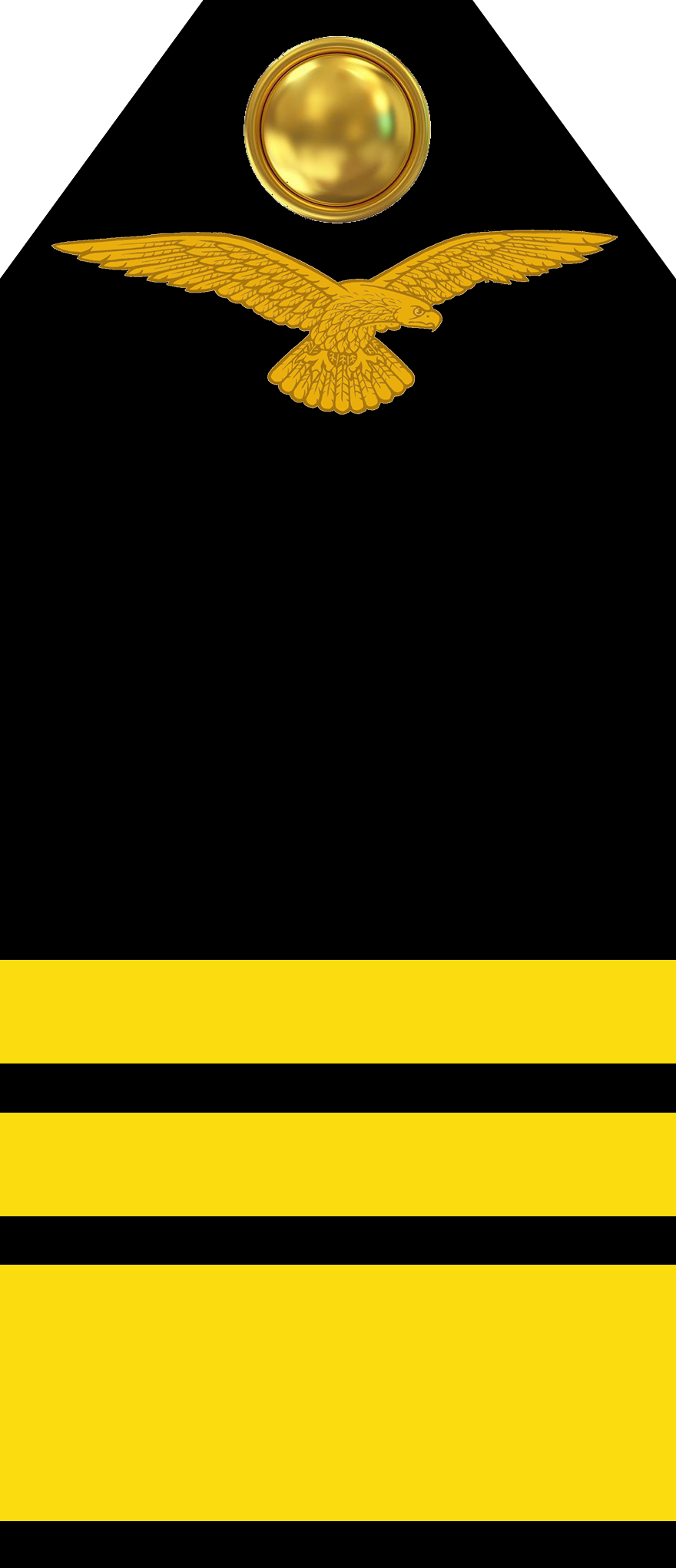
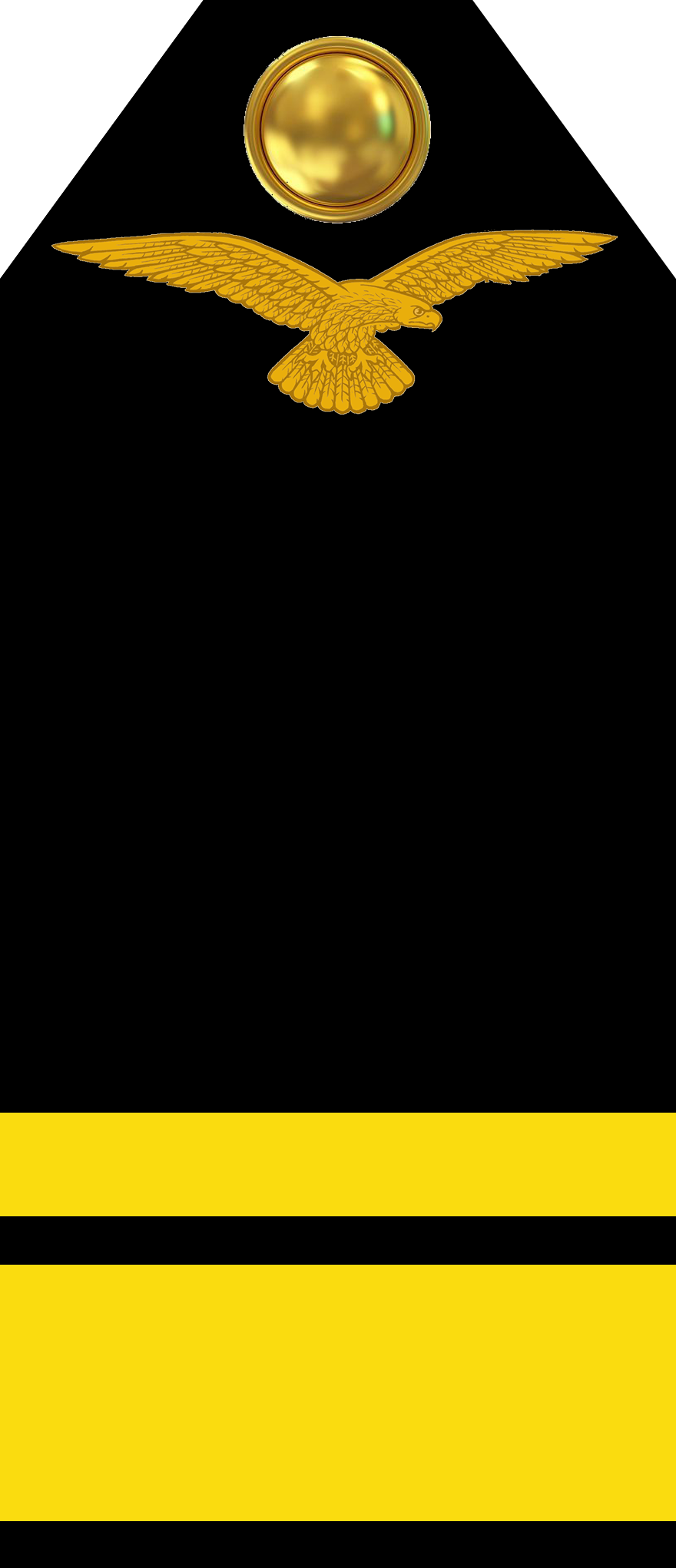
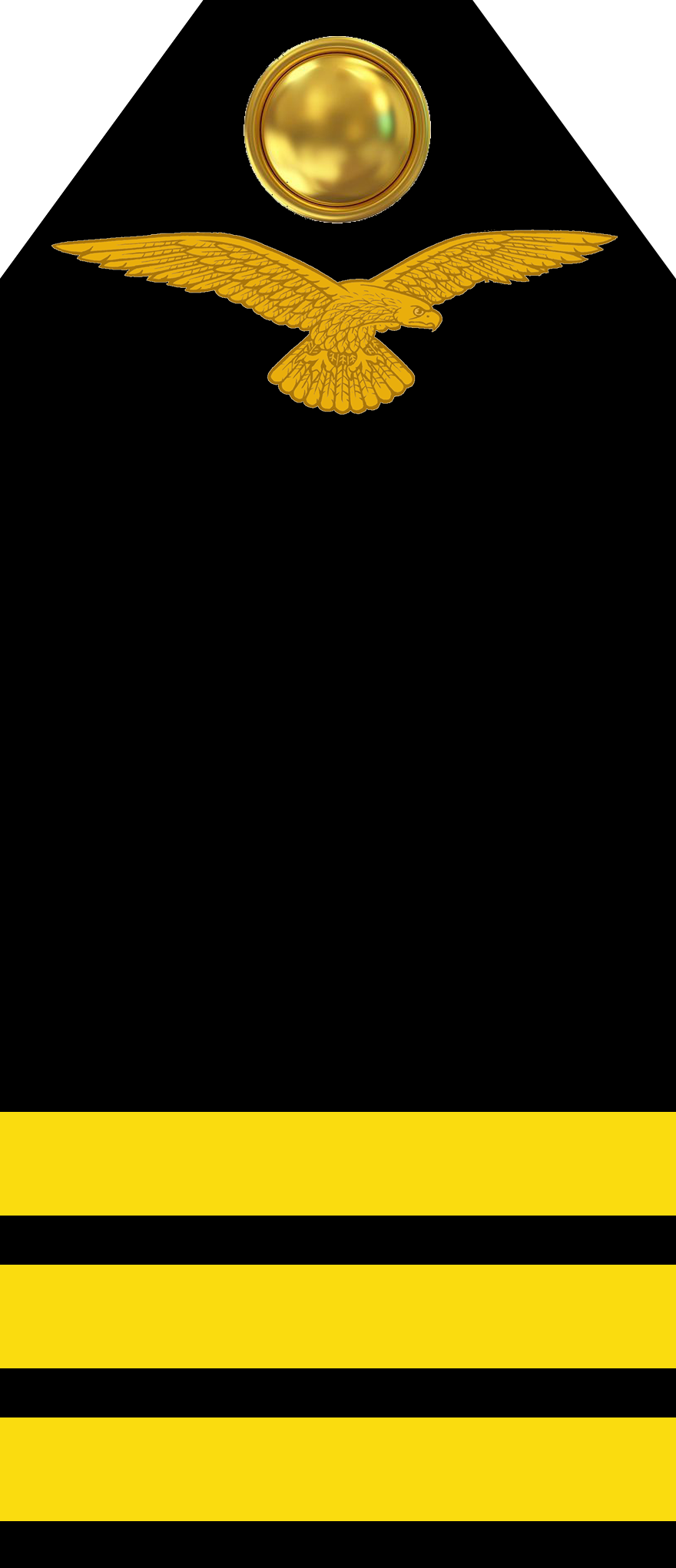
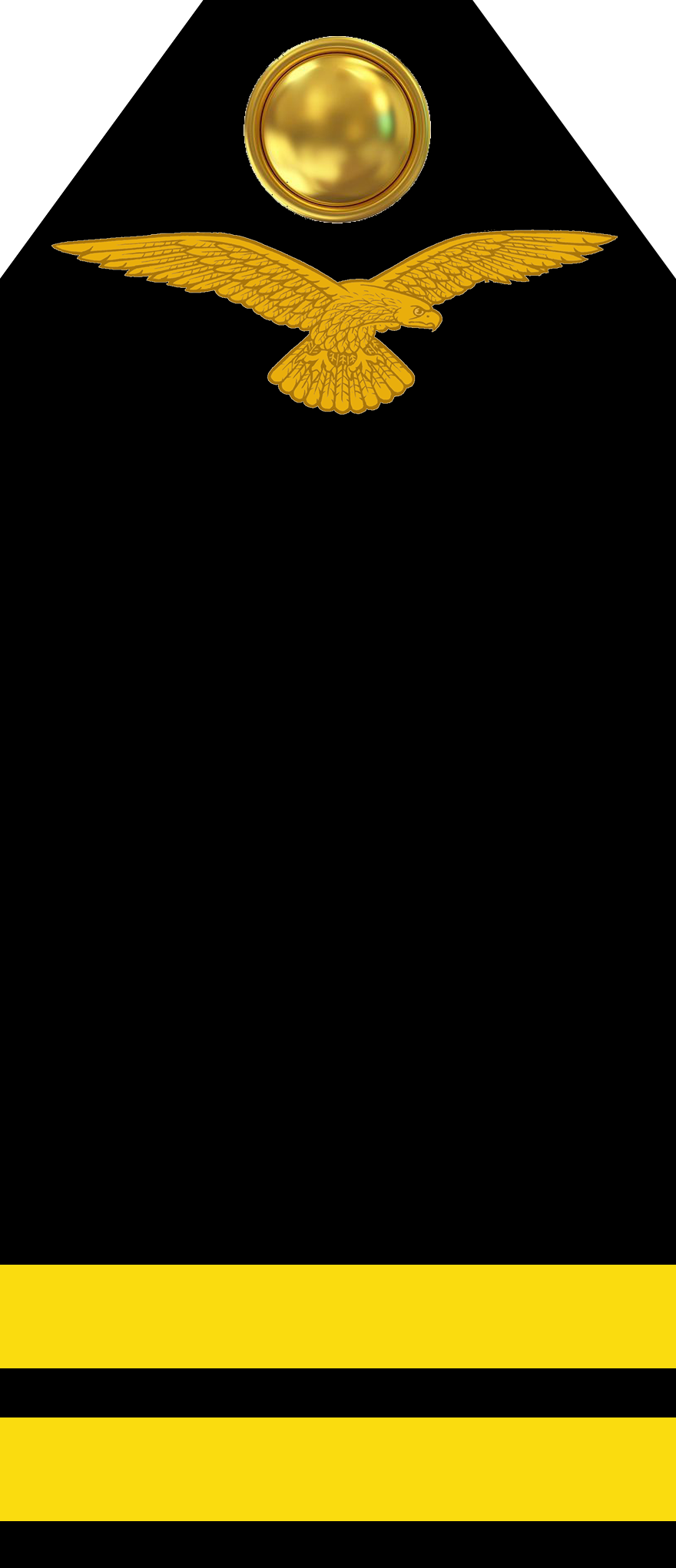
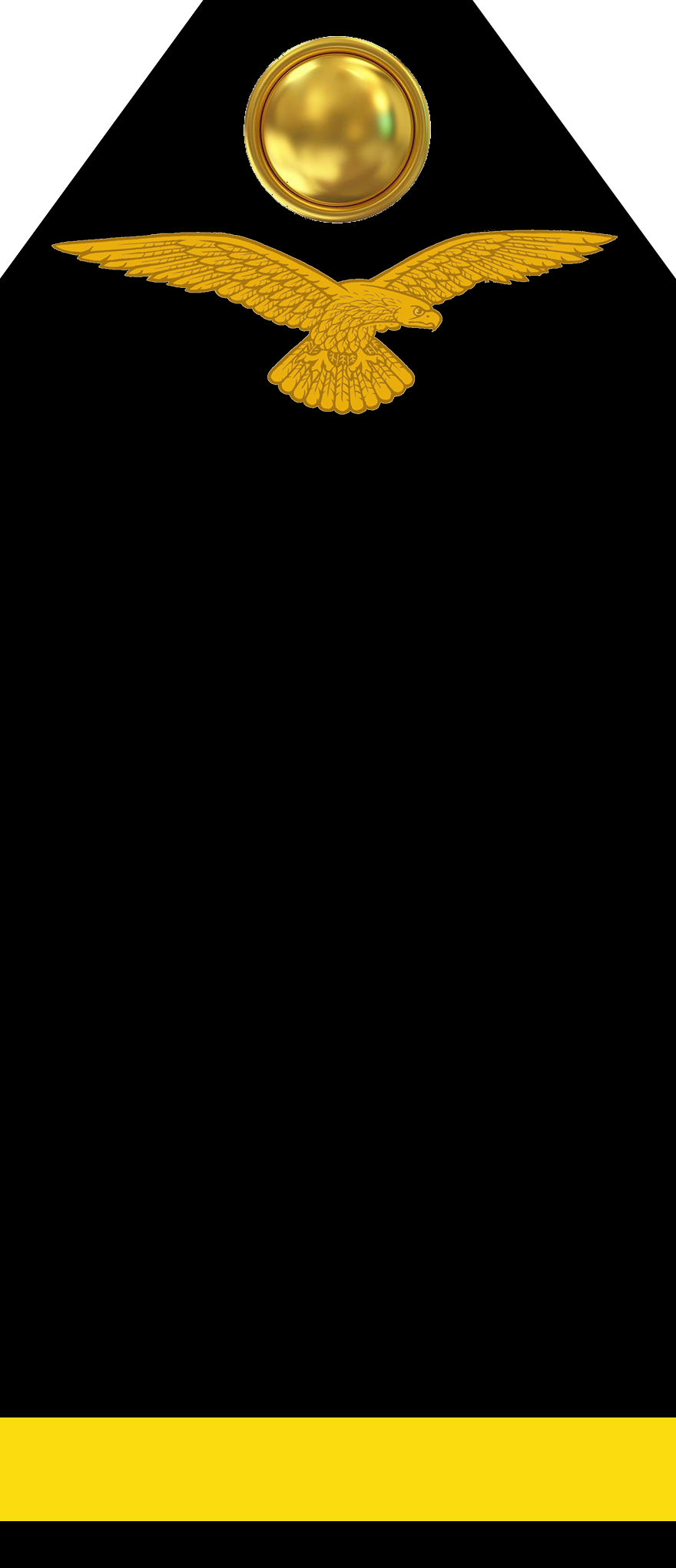
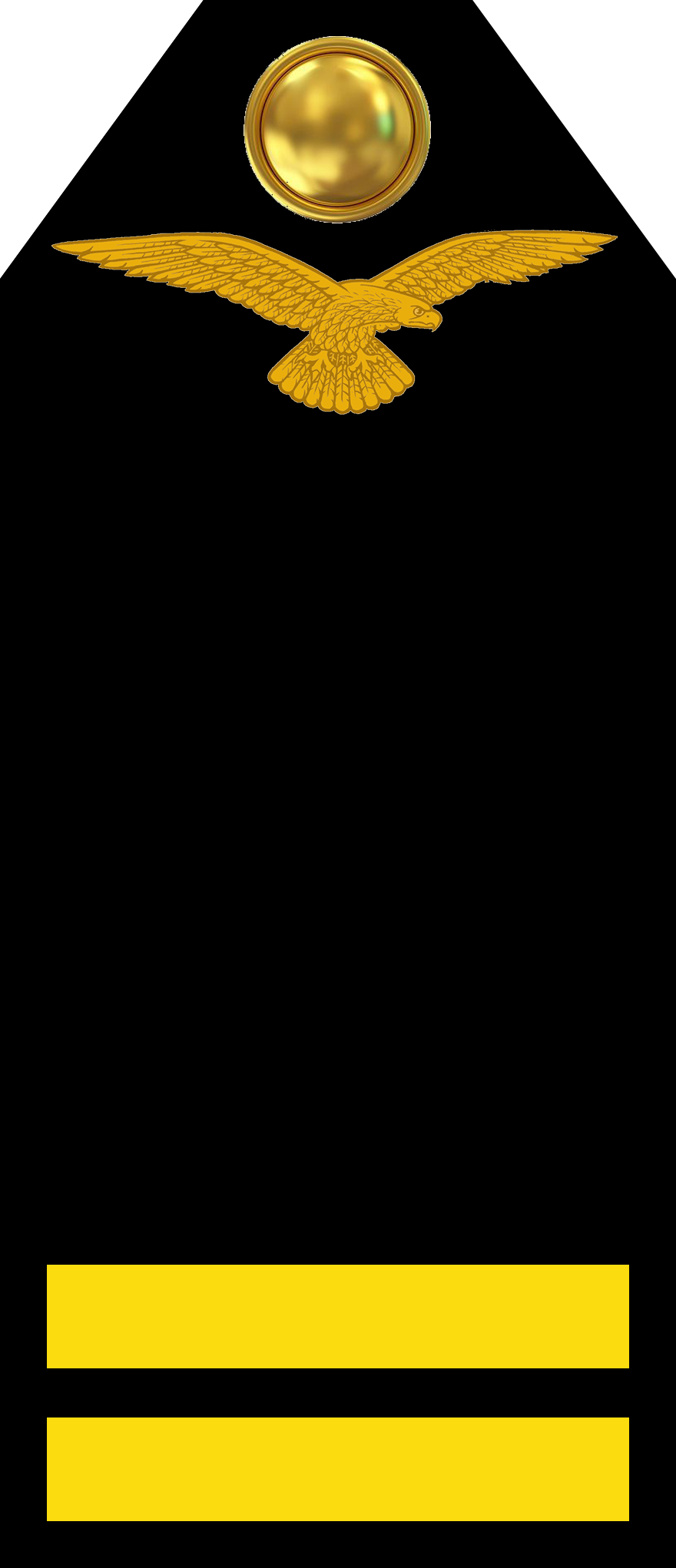
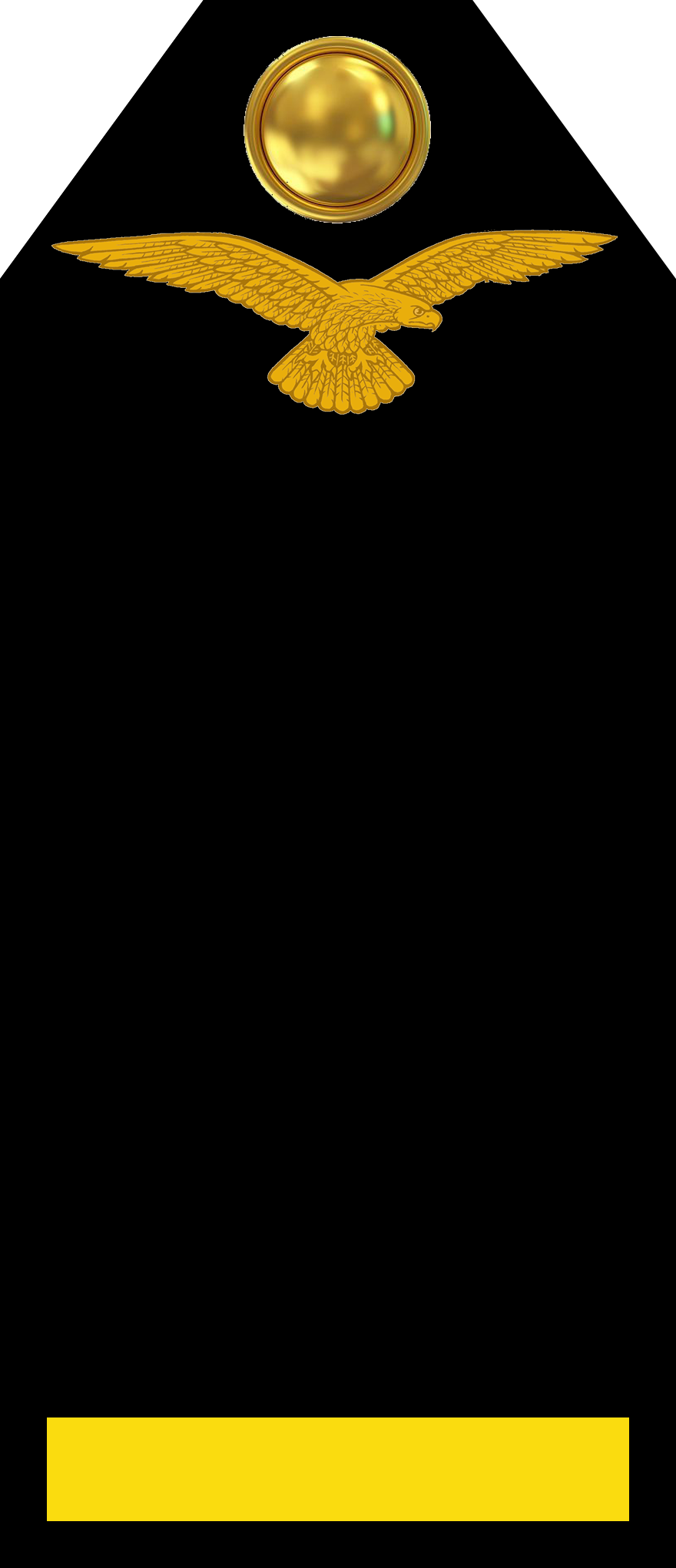
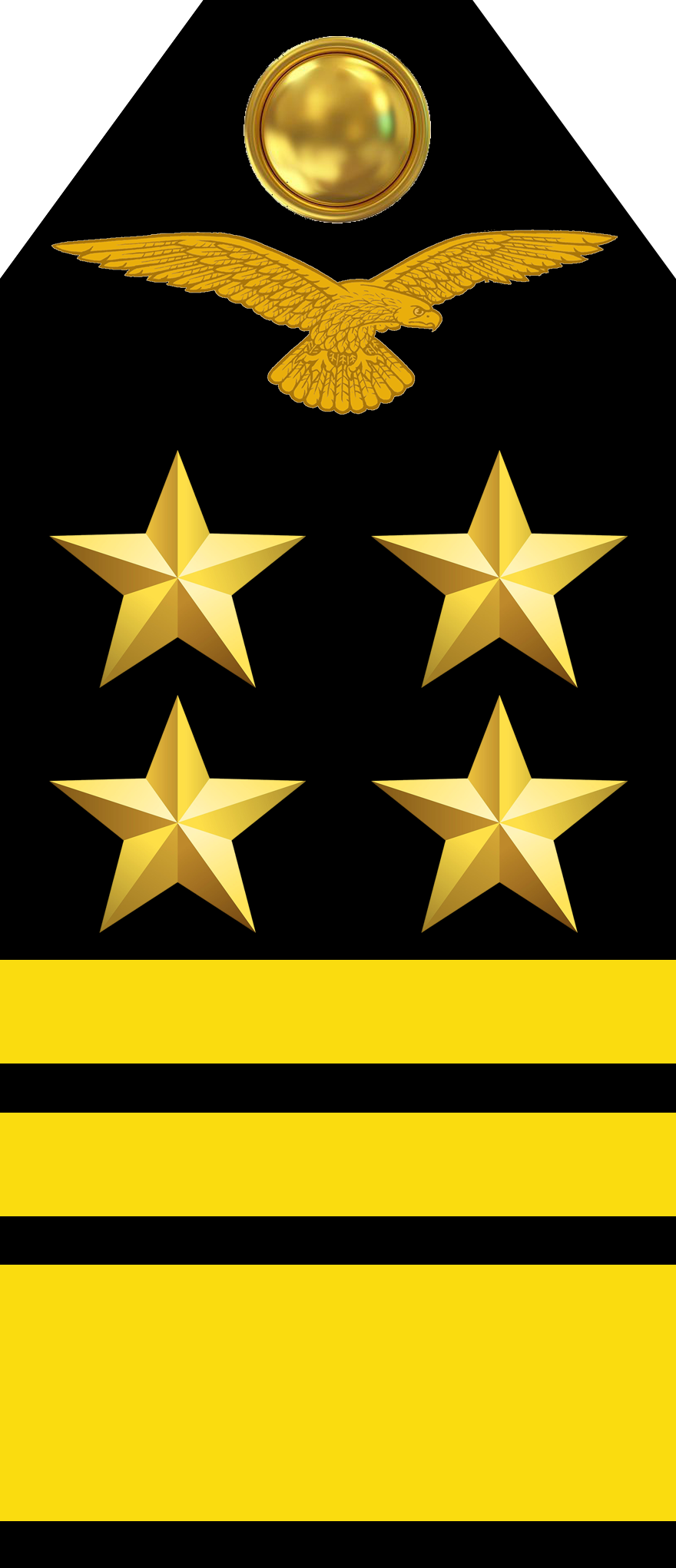
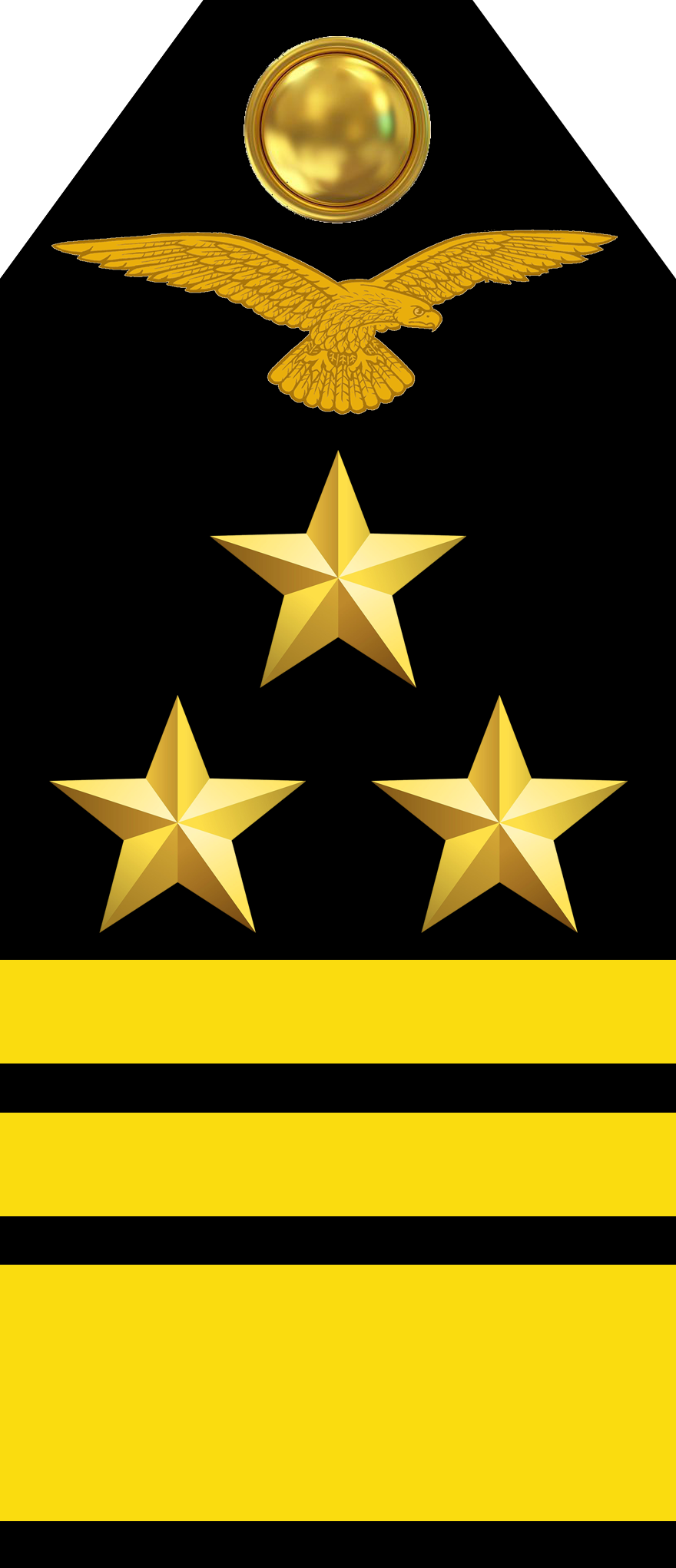
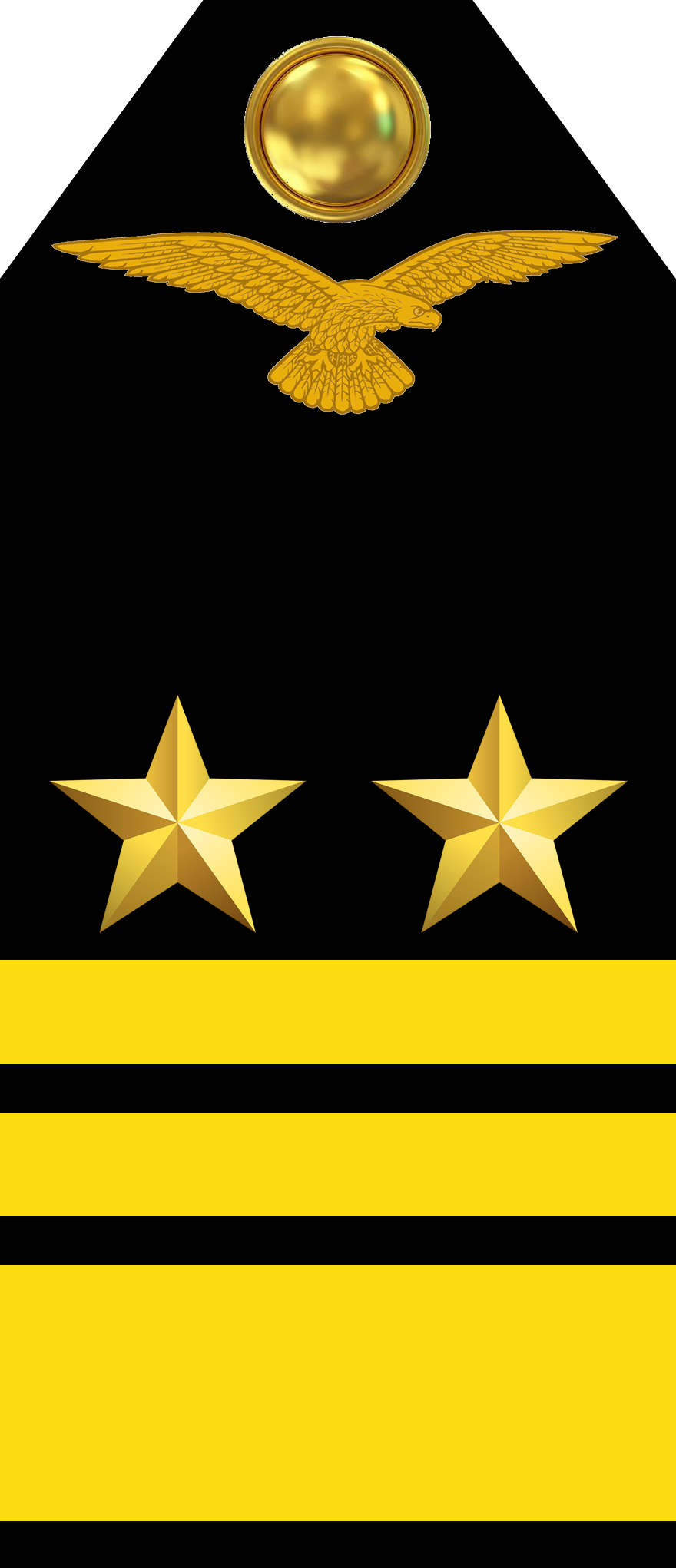
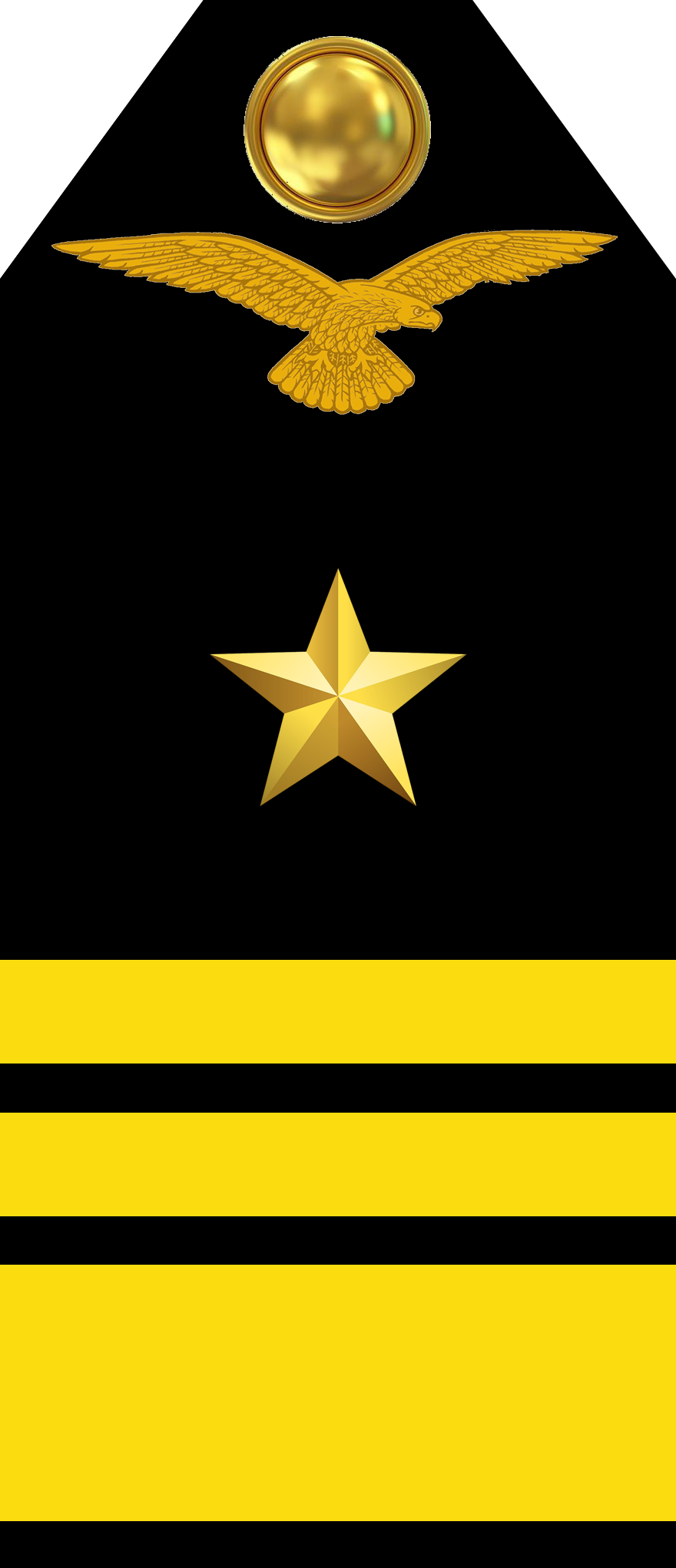
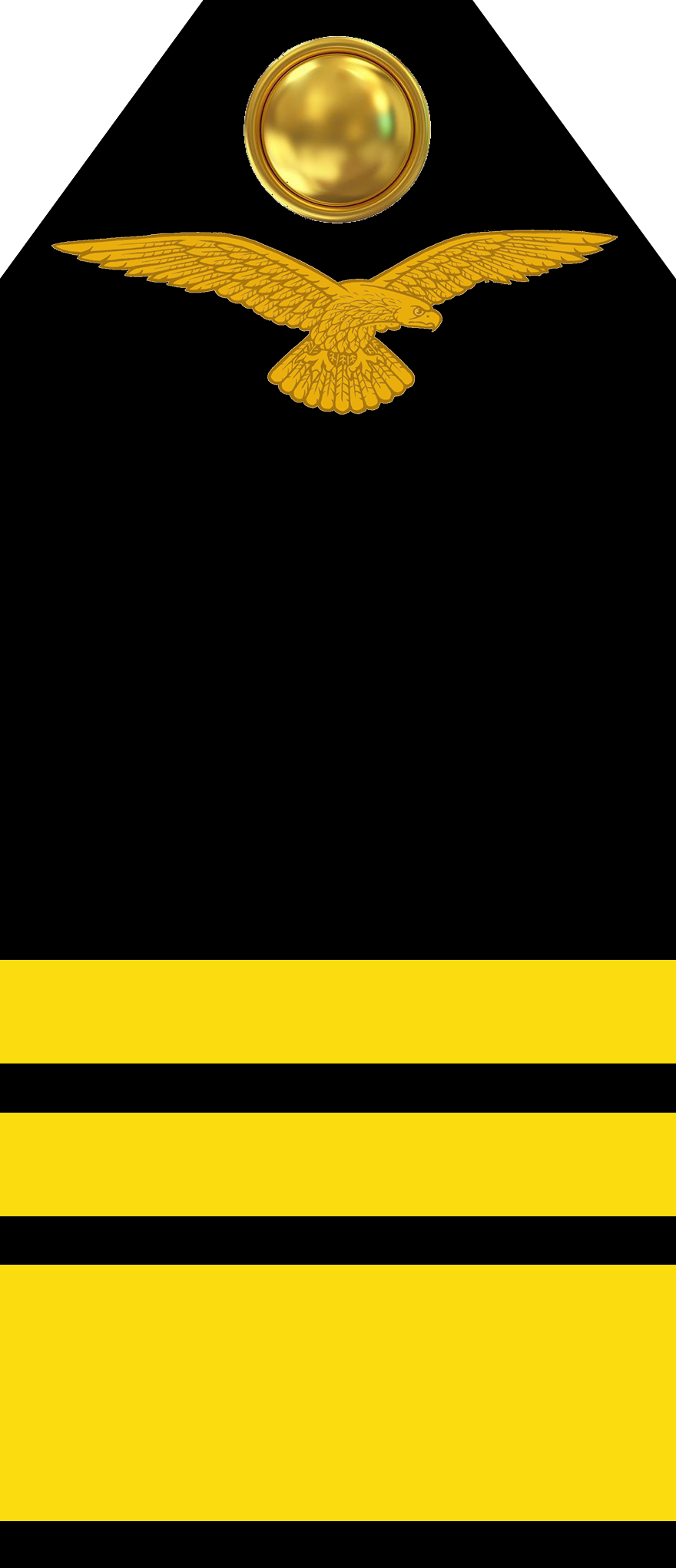
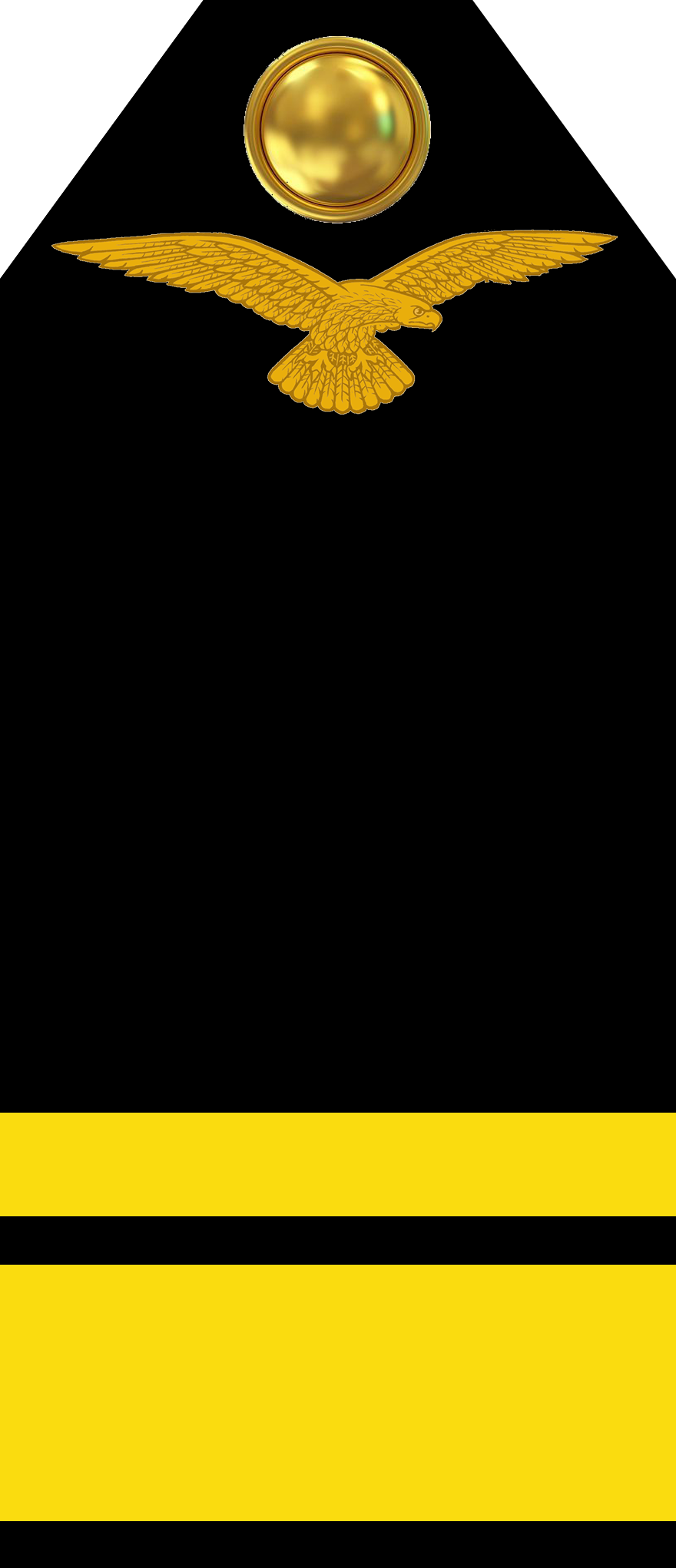
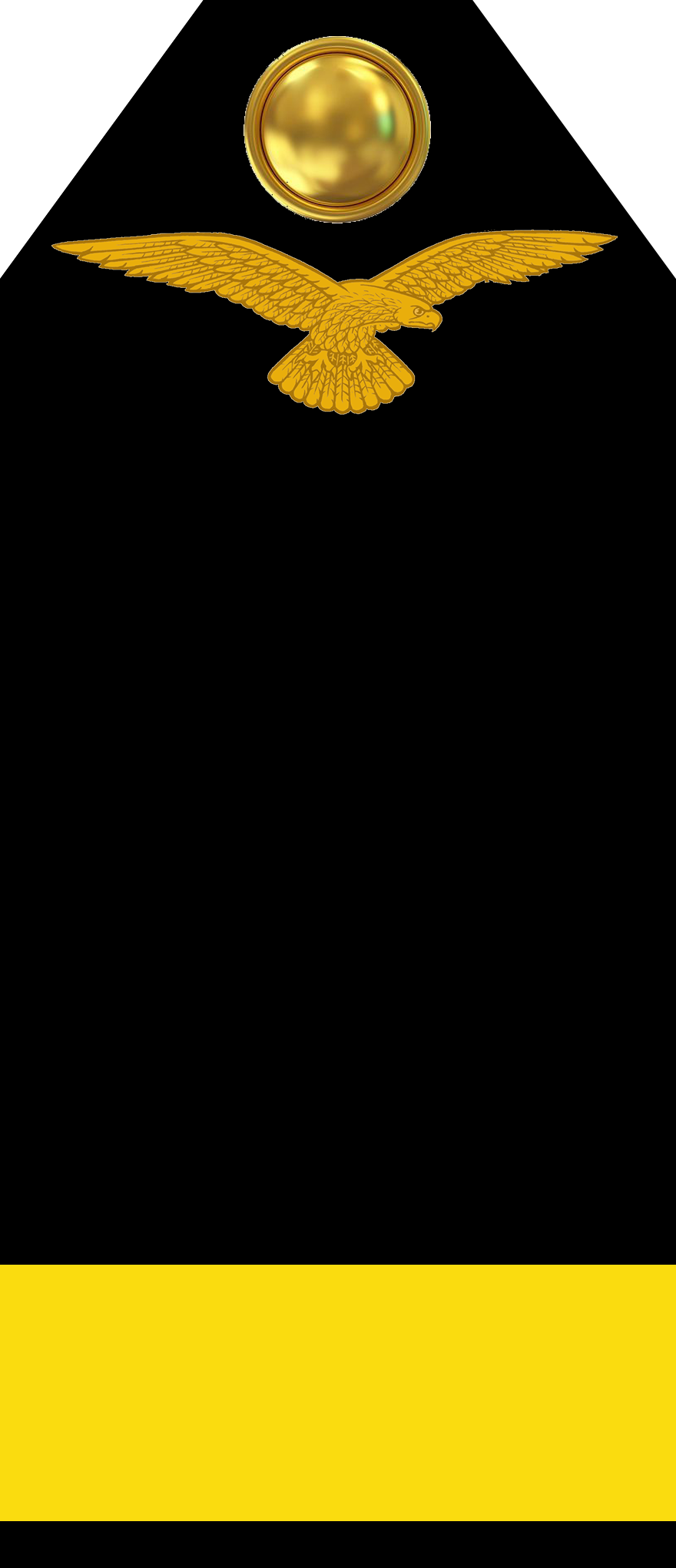
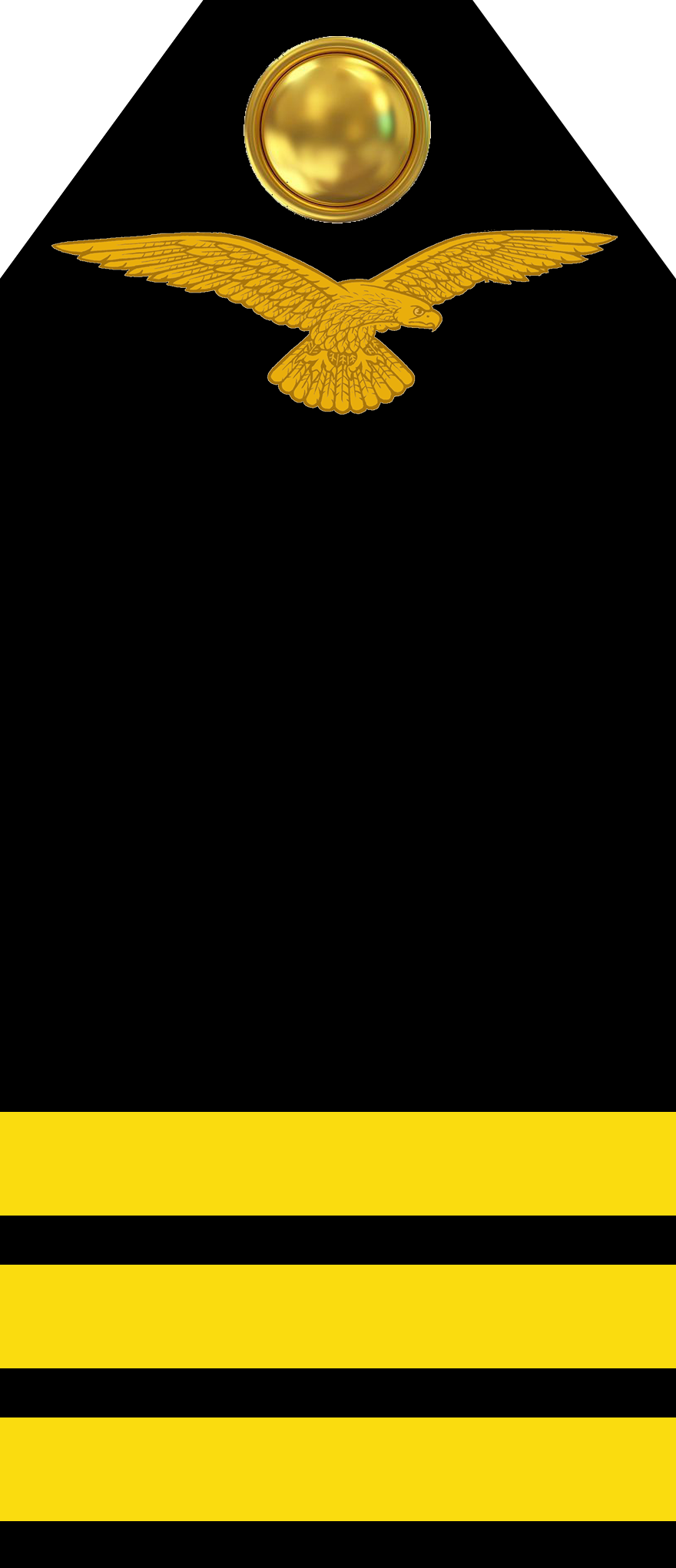
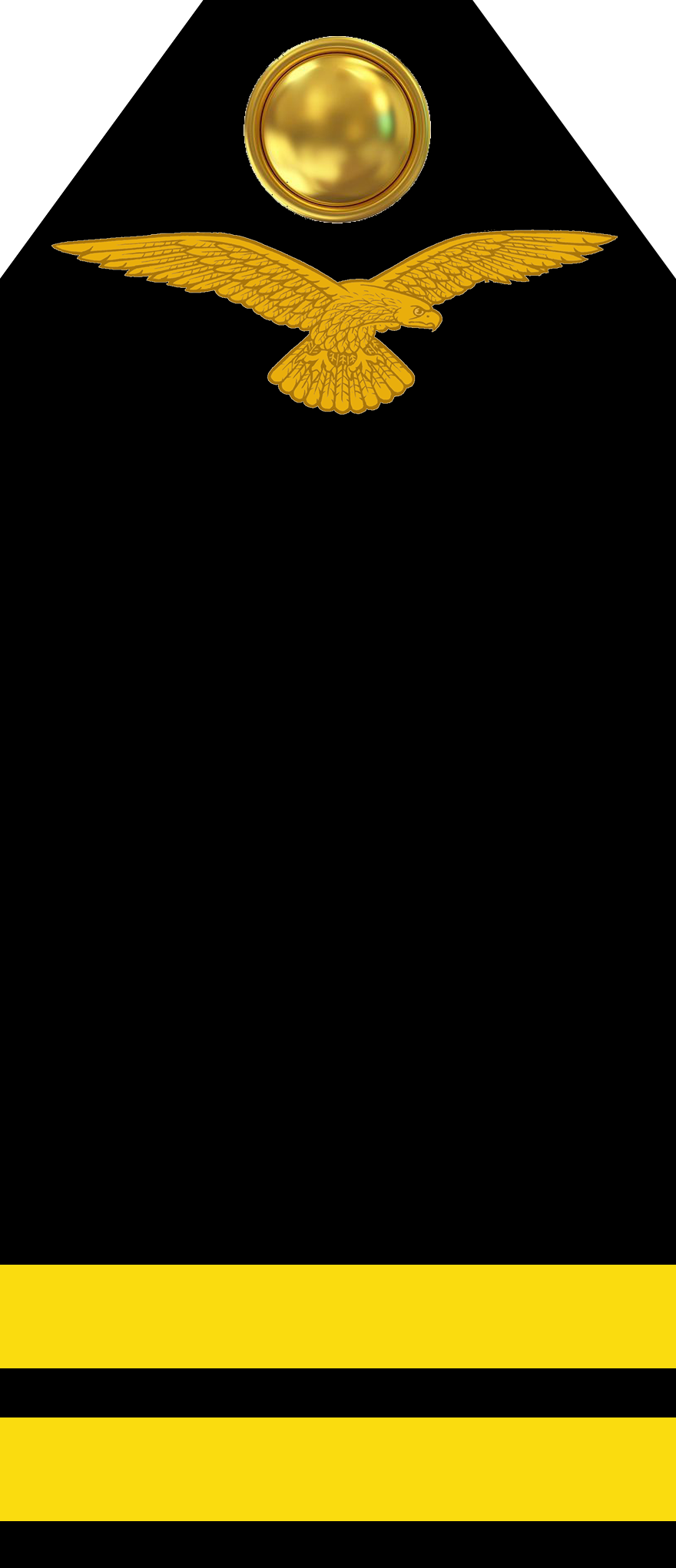
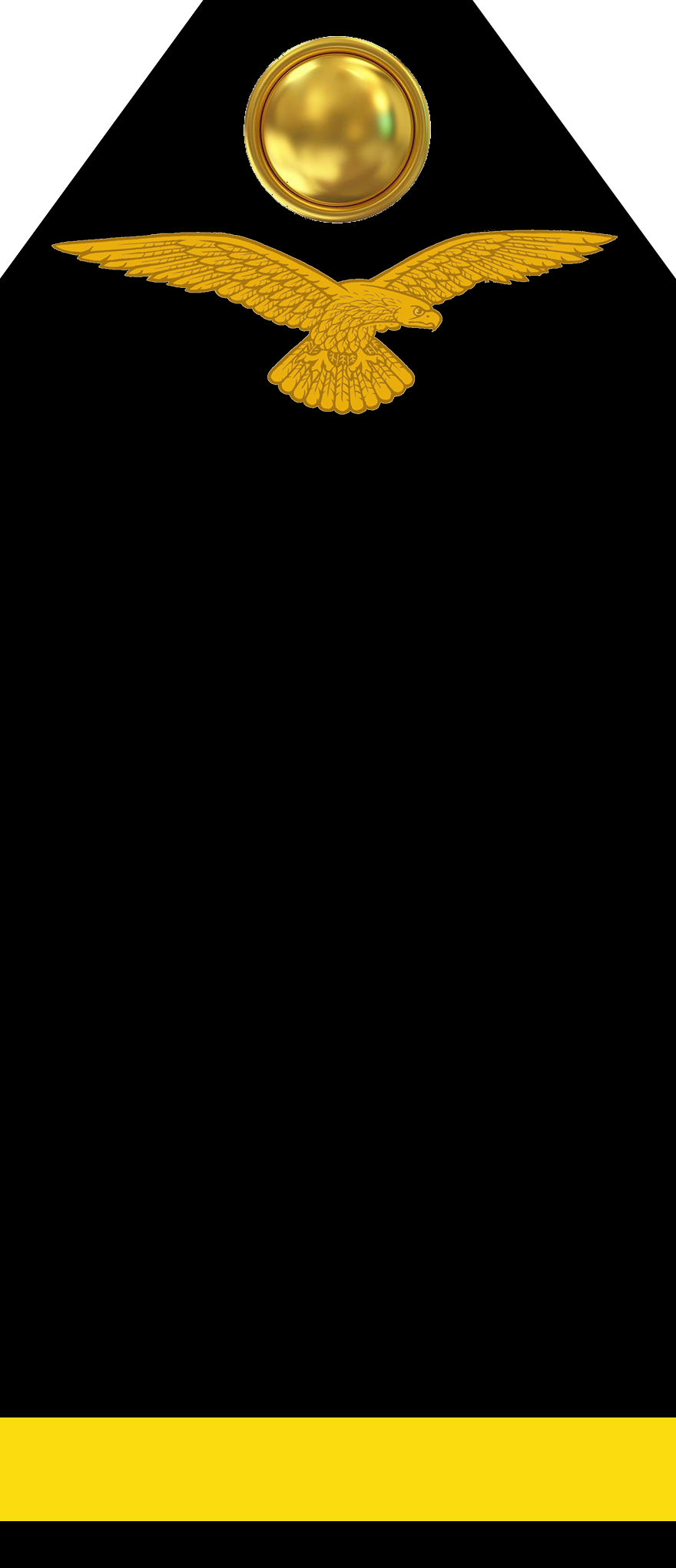
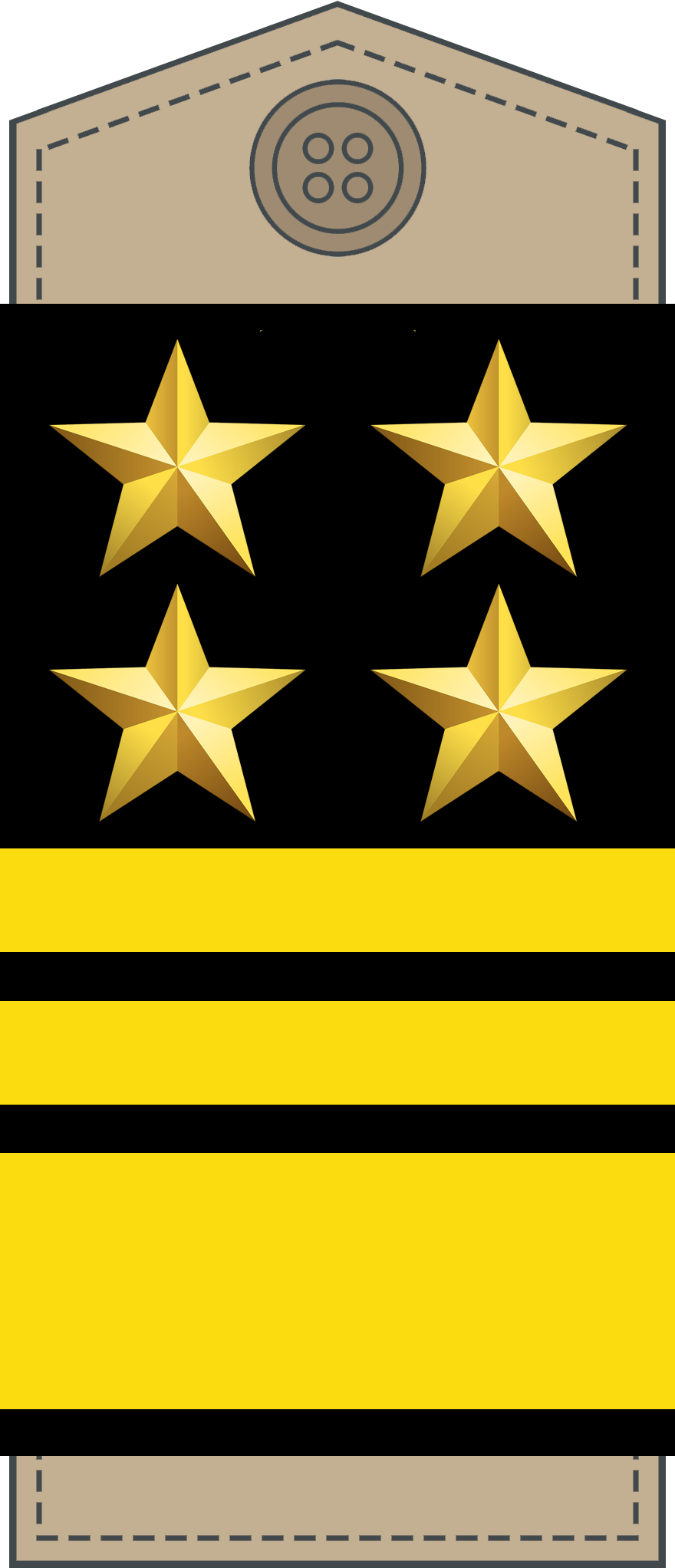
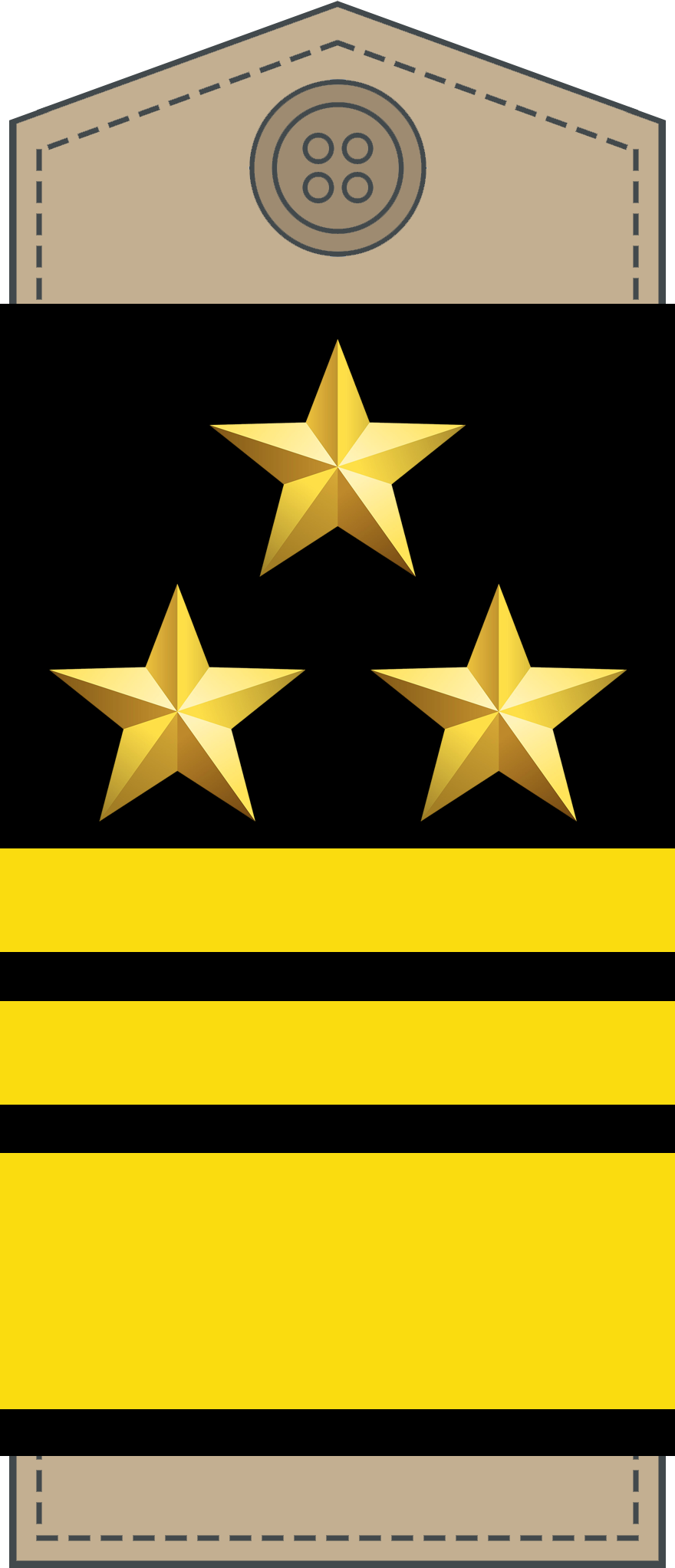
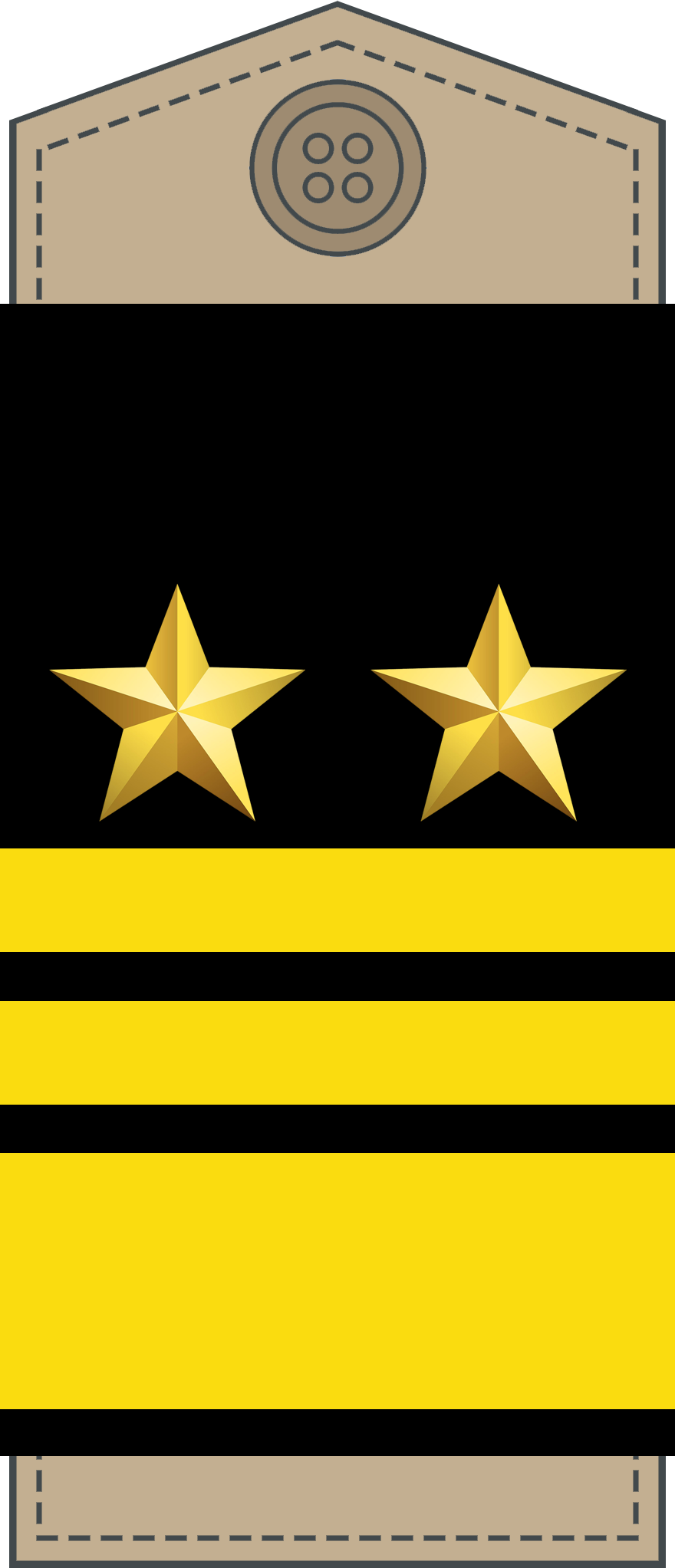
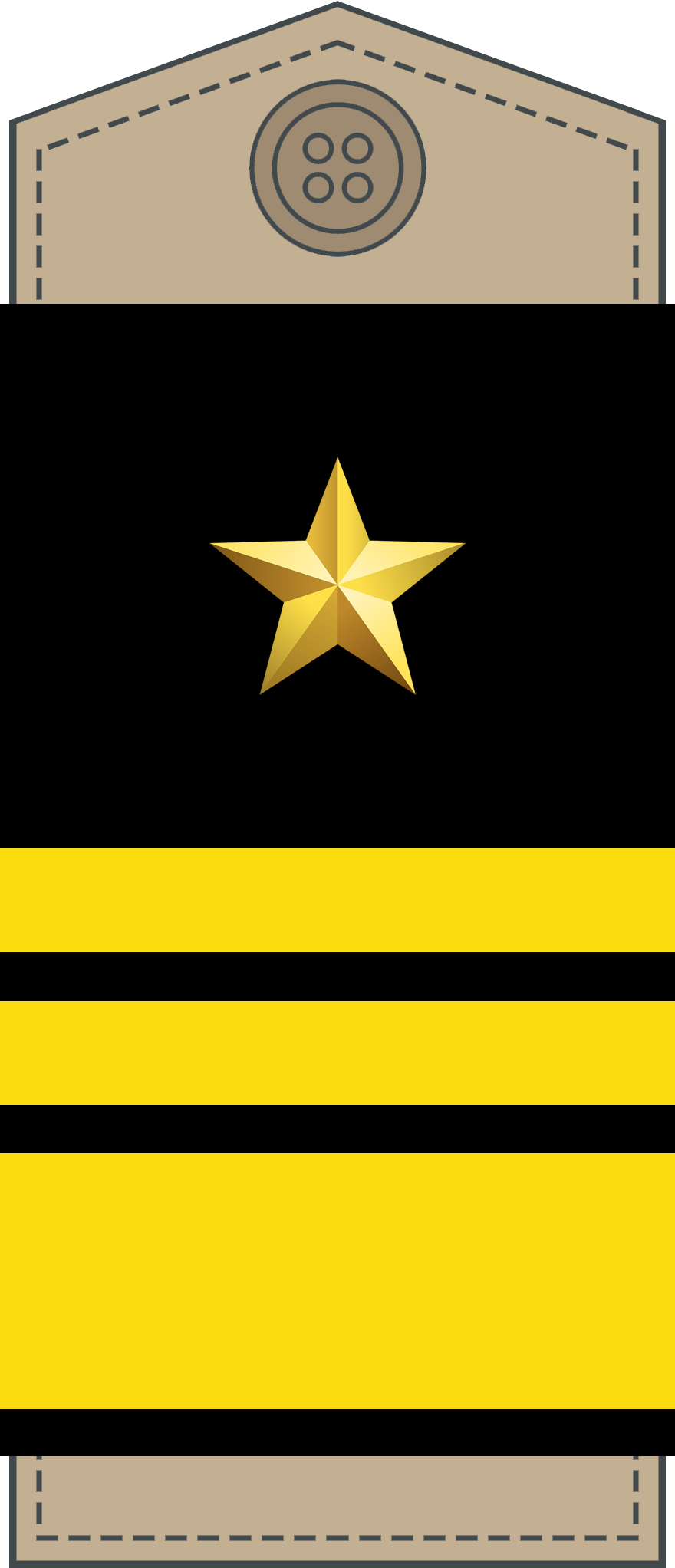
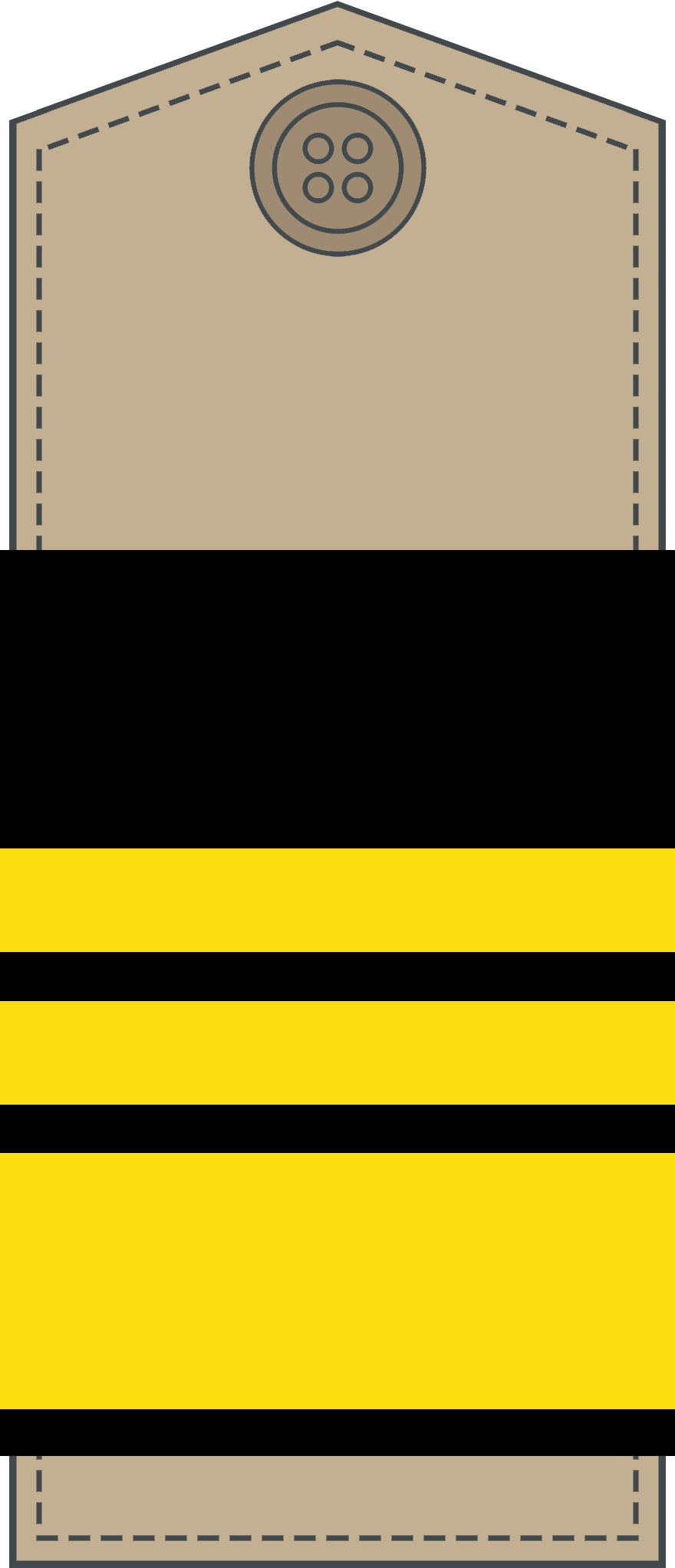
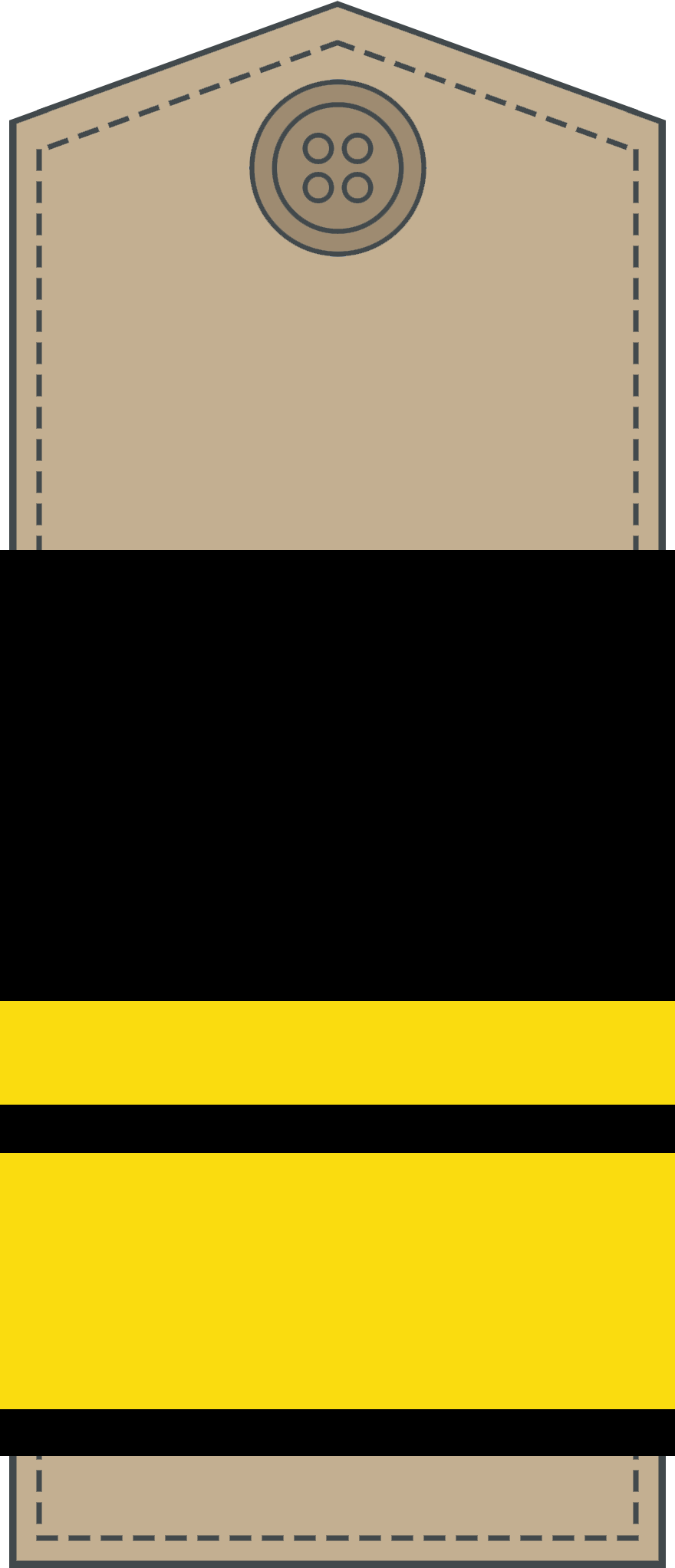
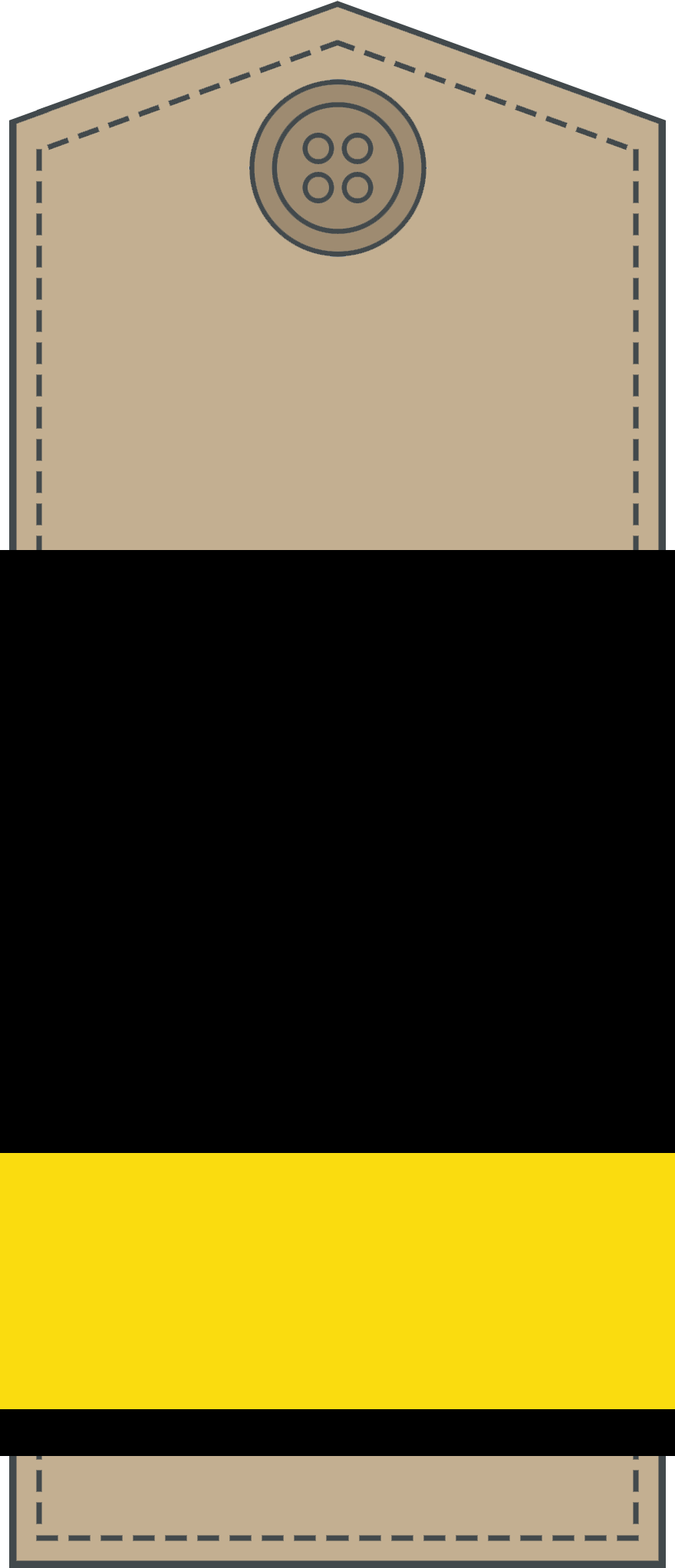
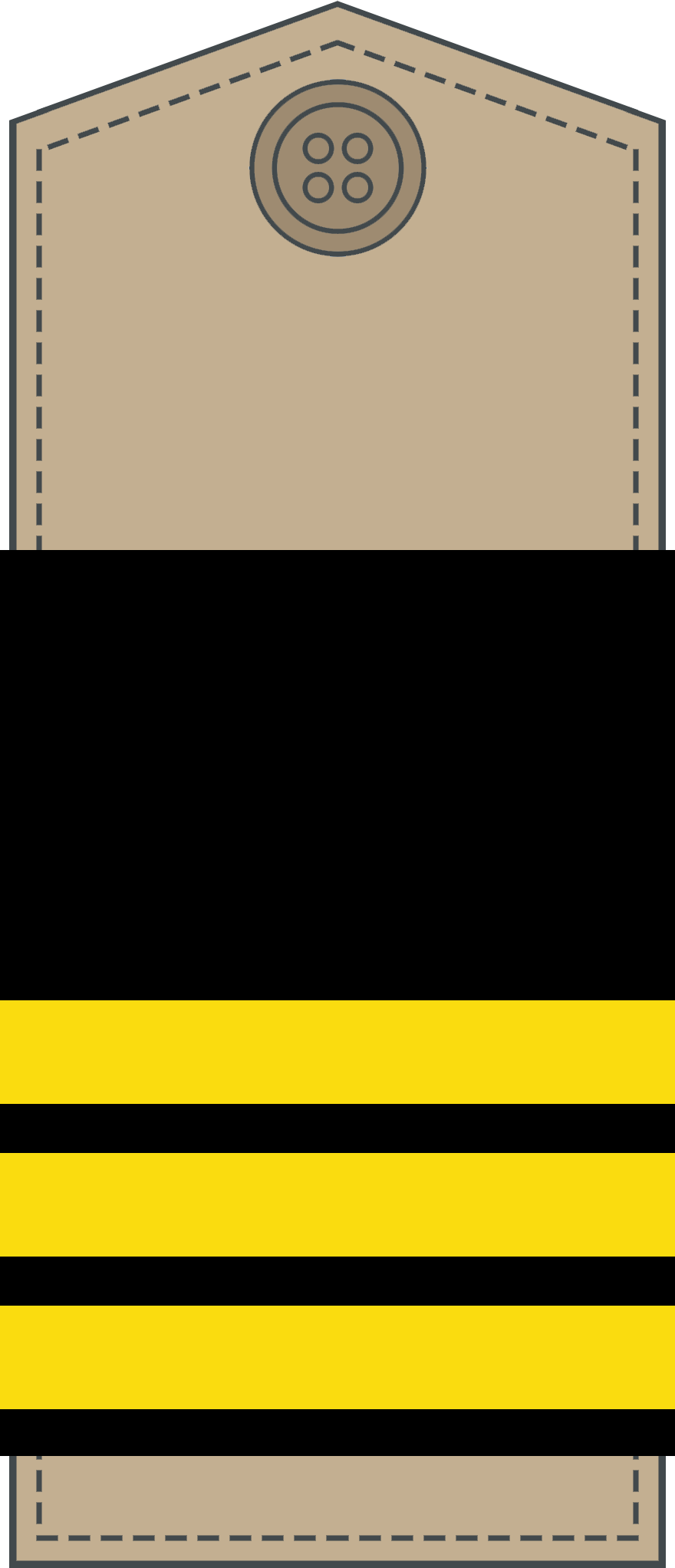
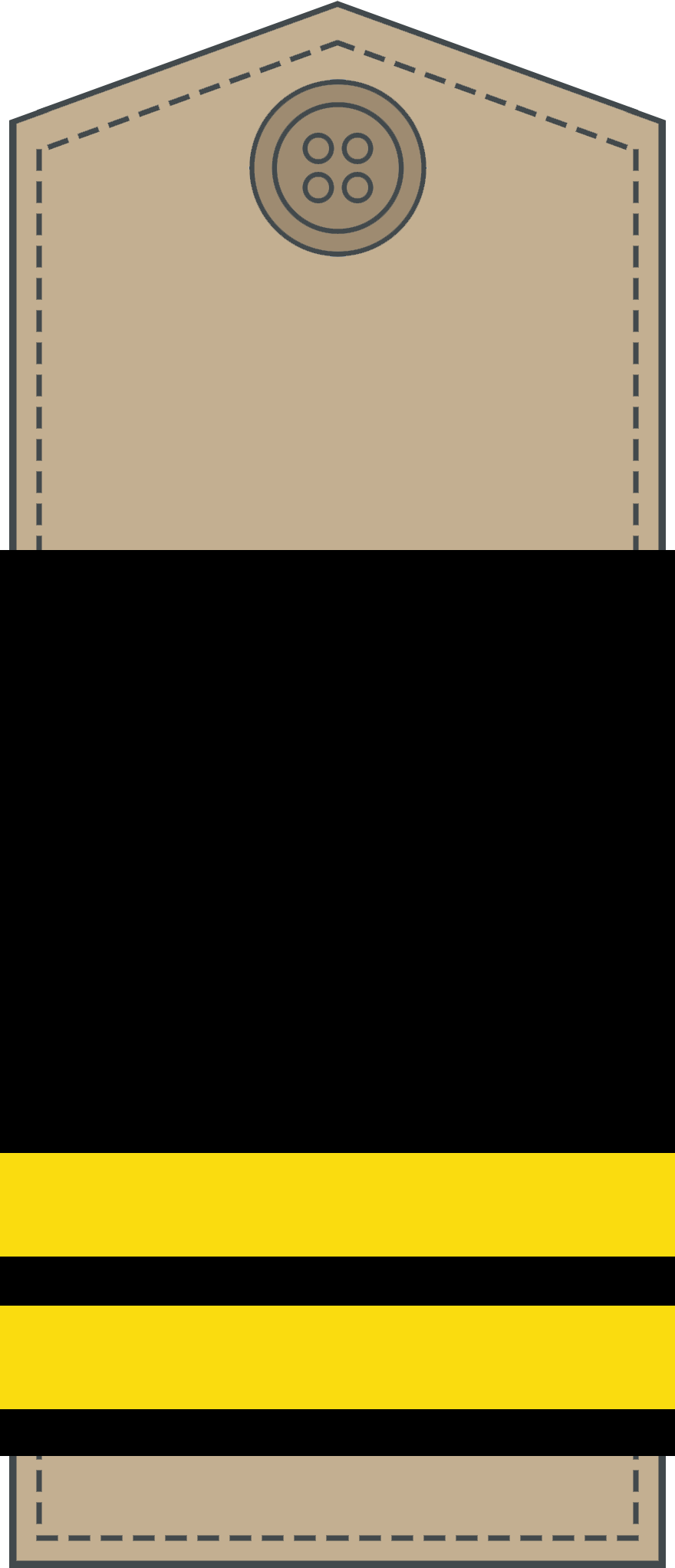
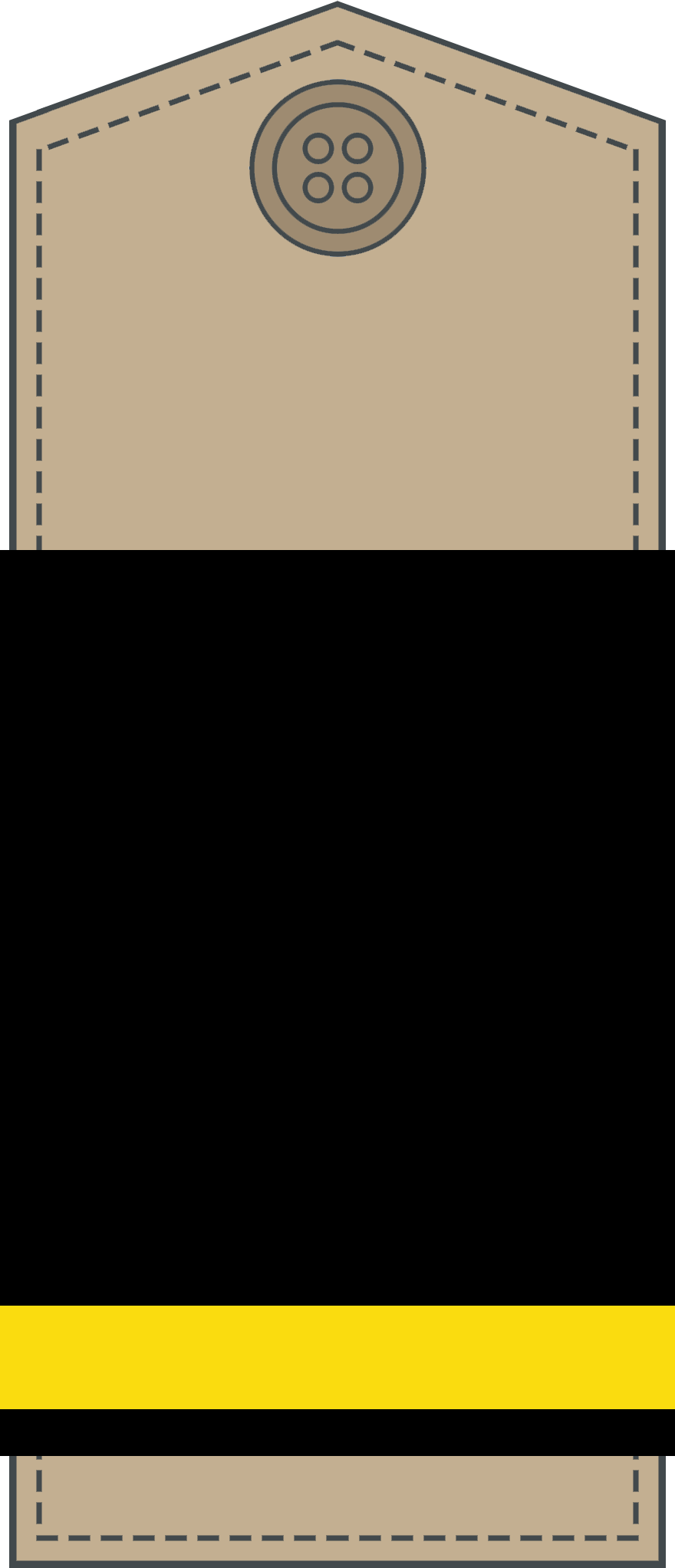
1946–1949
Rank group	Flag officers				Senior officers			Junior officers
Rank	Marscalk oedara	Laksamana oedara	Laksamana Moeda oedara	Komodor oedara	Komodor Moeda oedara	Opsir oedara I	Opsir oedara II	Opsir oedara III	Opsir Moeda oedara I	Opsir Moeda oedara II
Insignia
1949–1957
Rank group	Flag officers				Senior officers			Junior officers
Rank	Laksamana Tertinggi udara (adopted 1950)	Laksamana Besar udara	Laksamana udara	Laksamana Muda udara	Komodor udara	Komodor Muda udara	Major udara	Kapten udara	Letnan I udara	Letnan II udara
Insignia Full dress uniform
Insignia Service dress uniform

===== Enlisted personnel =====
The rank insignia of non-commissioned officers and enlisted personnels.

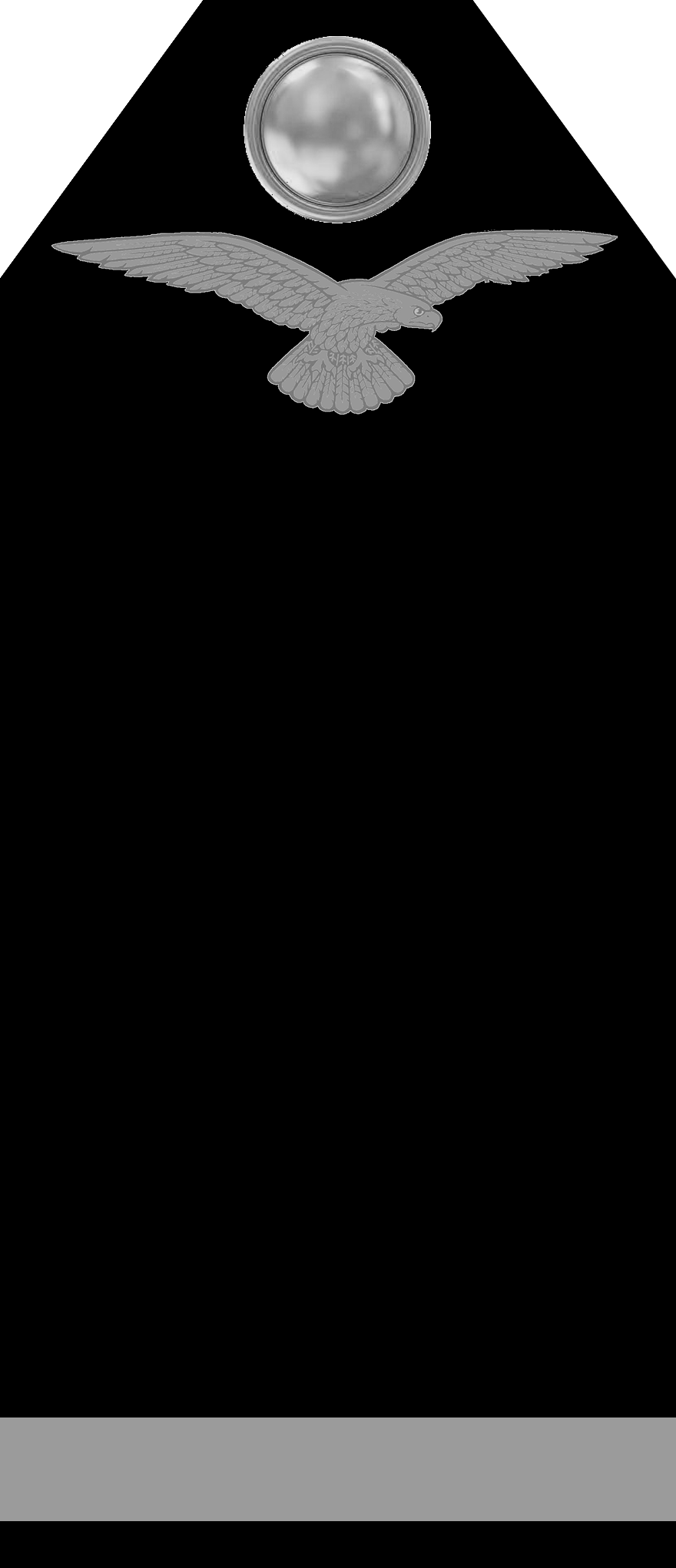
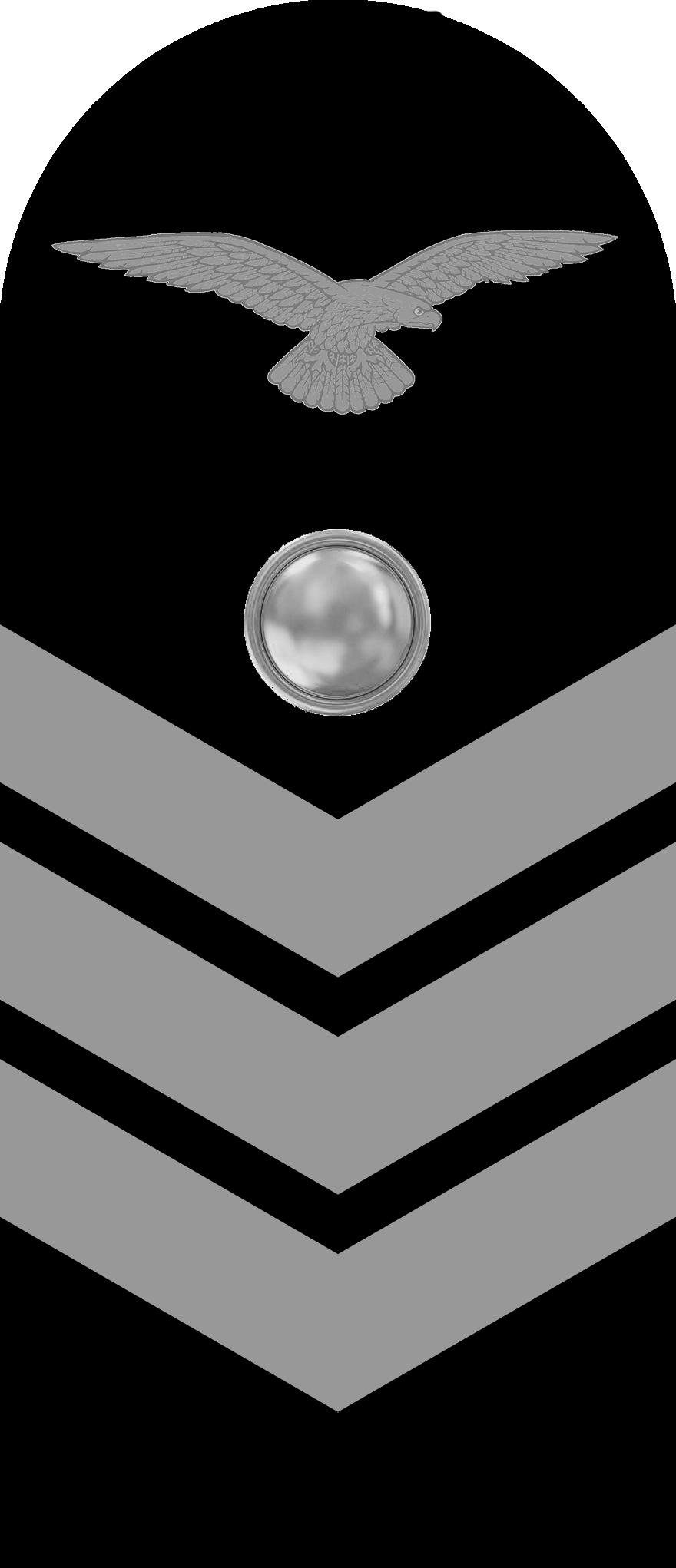
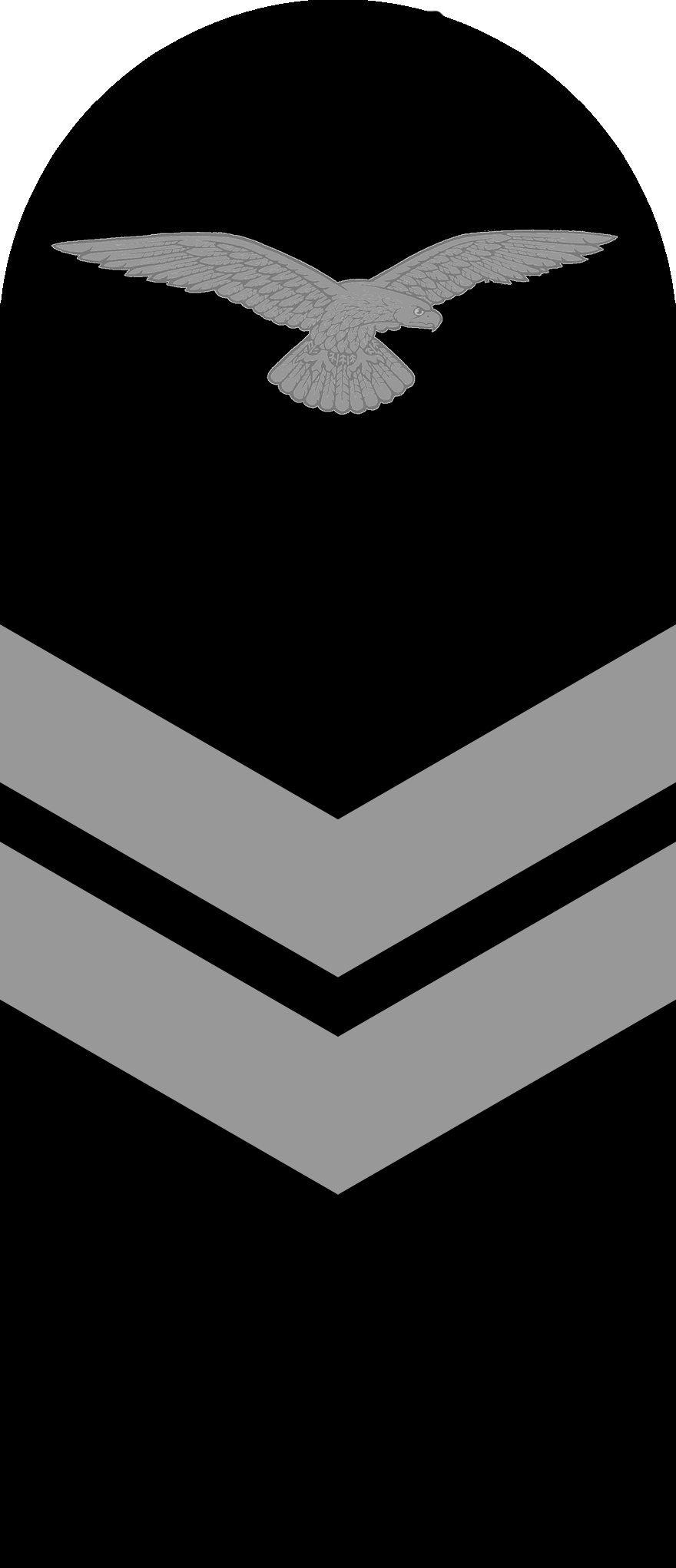
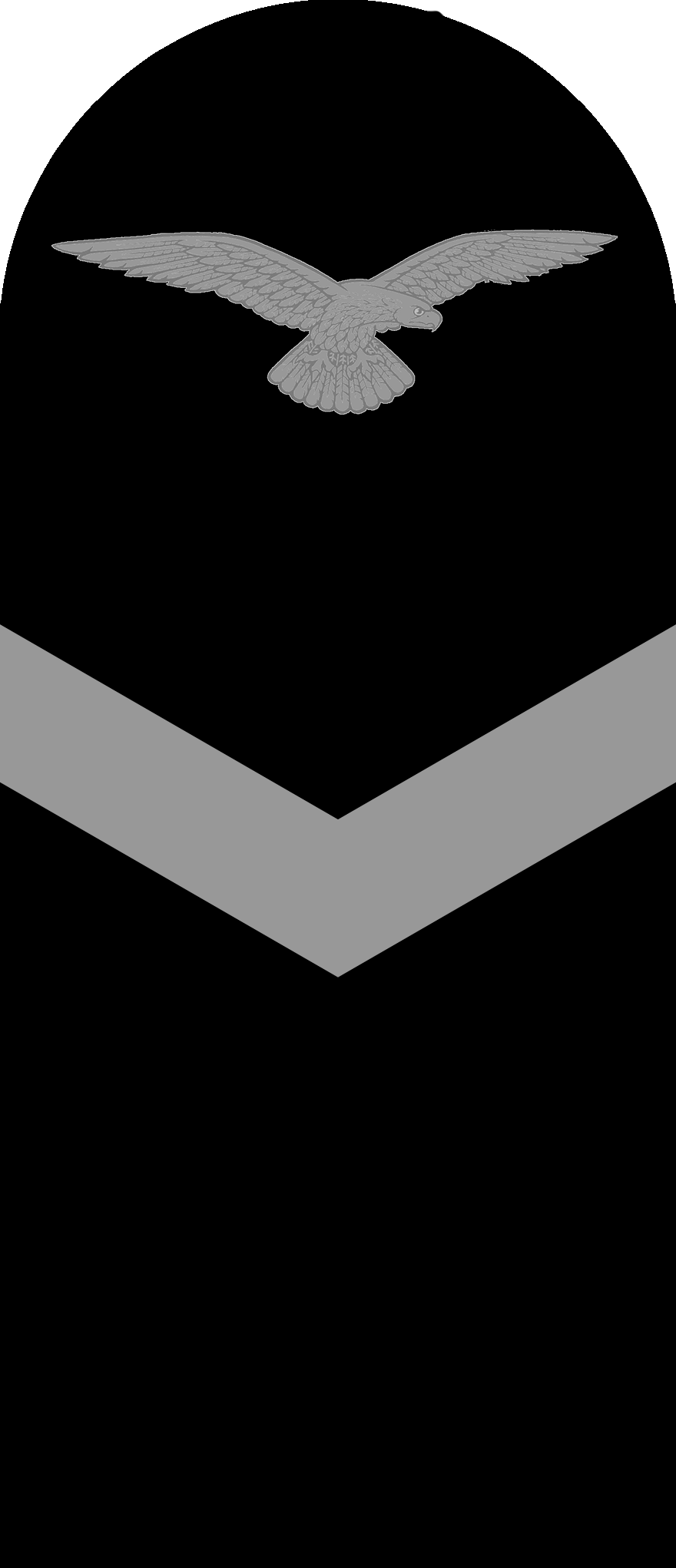
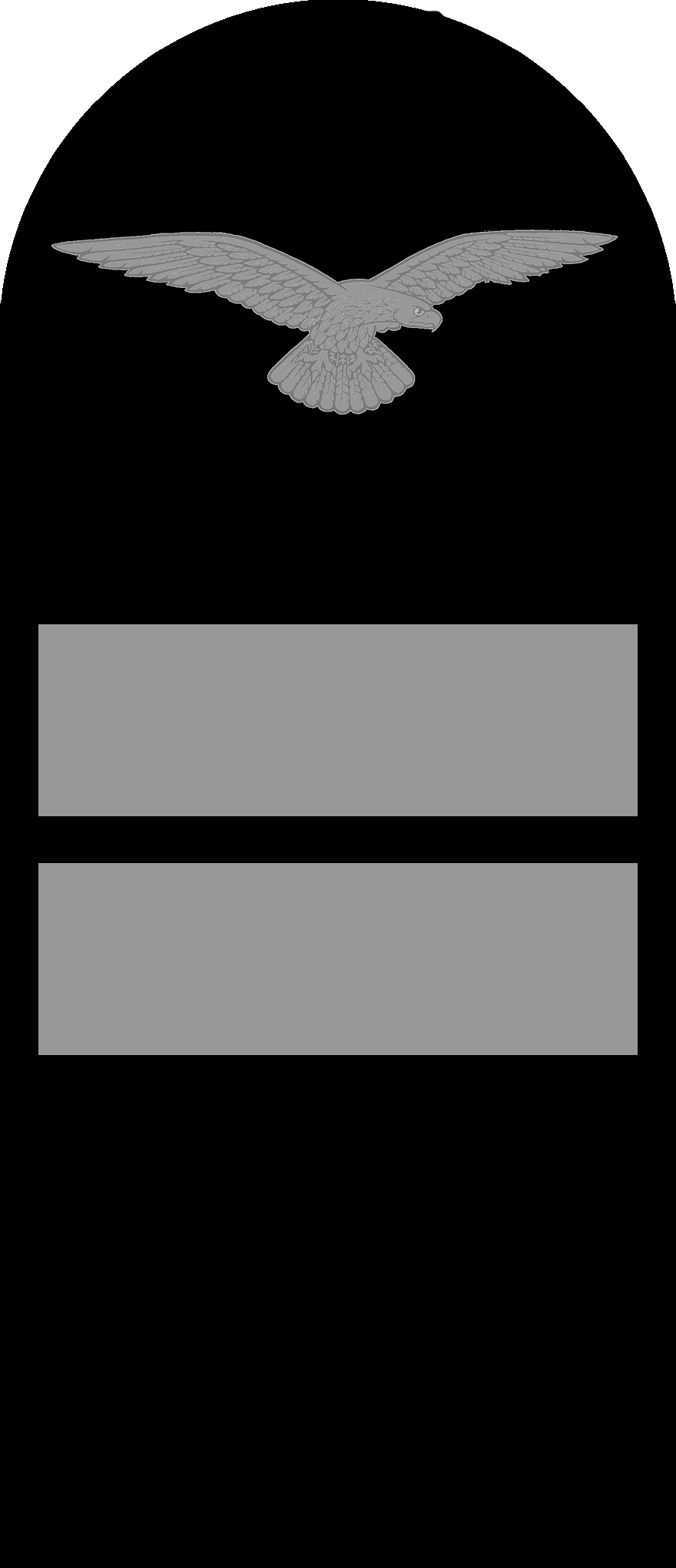
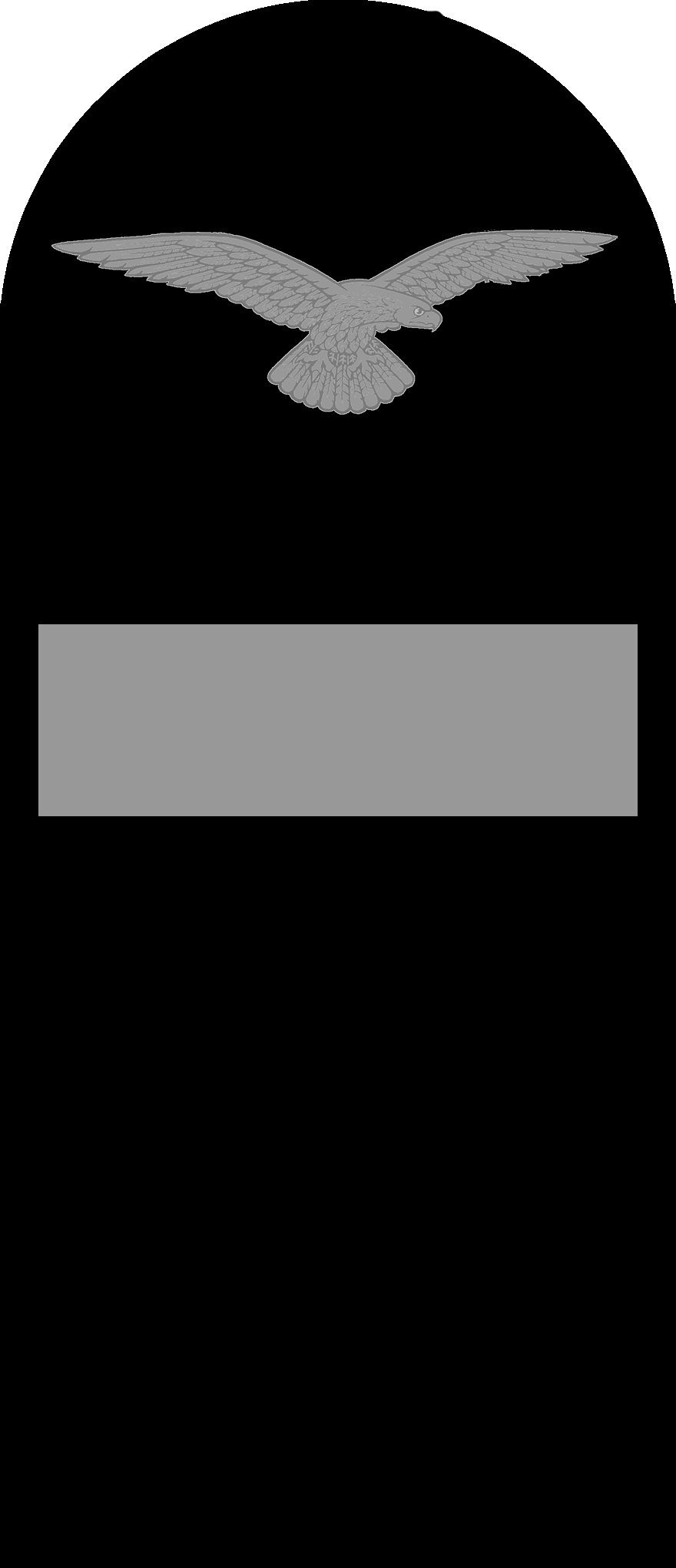
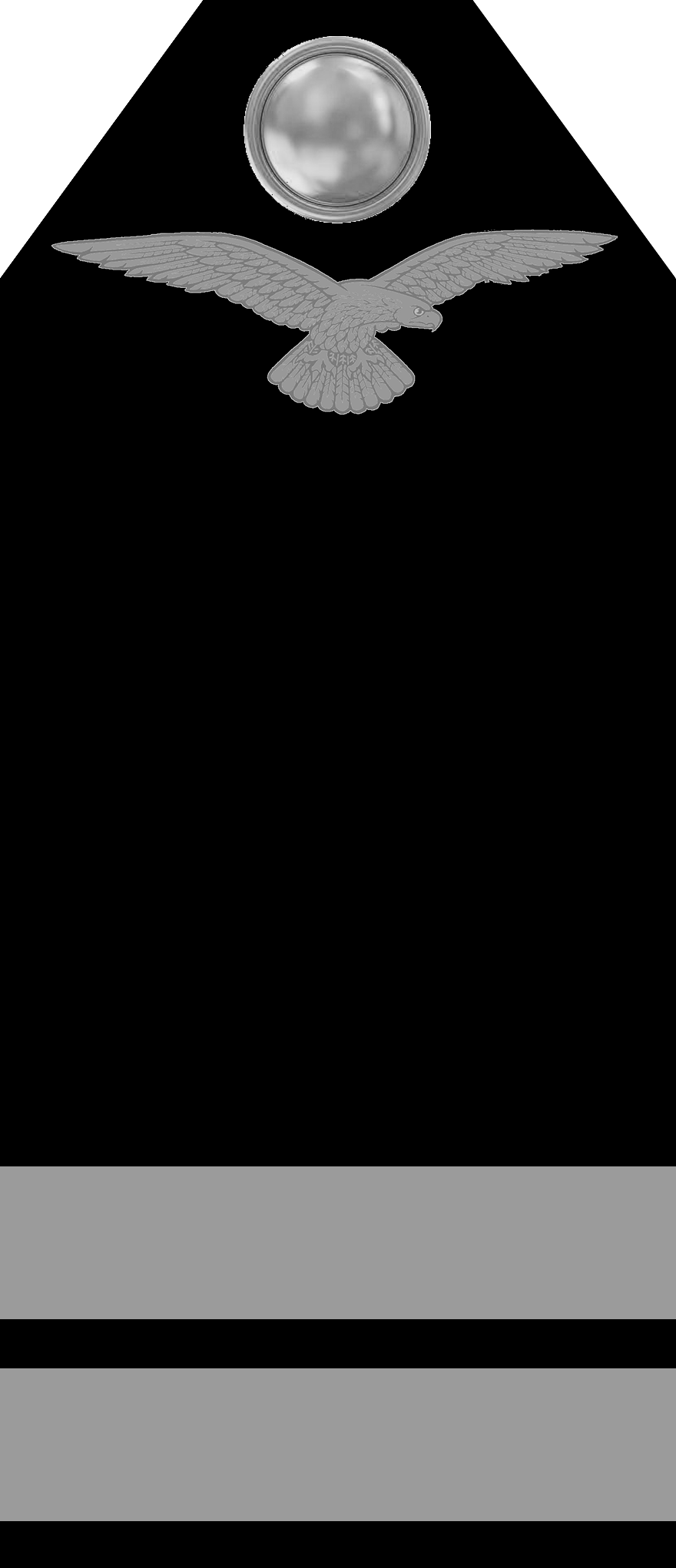
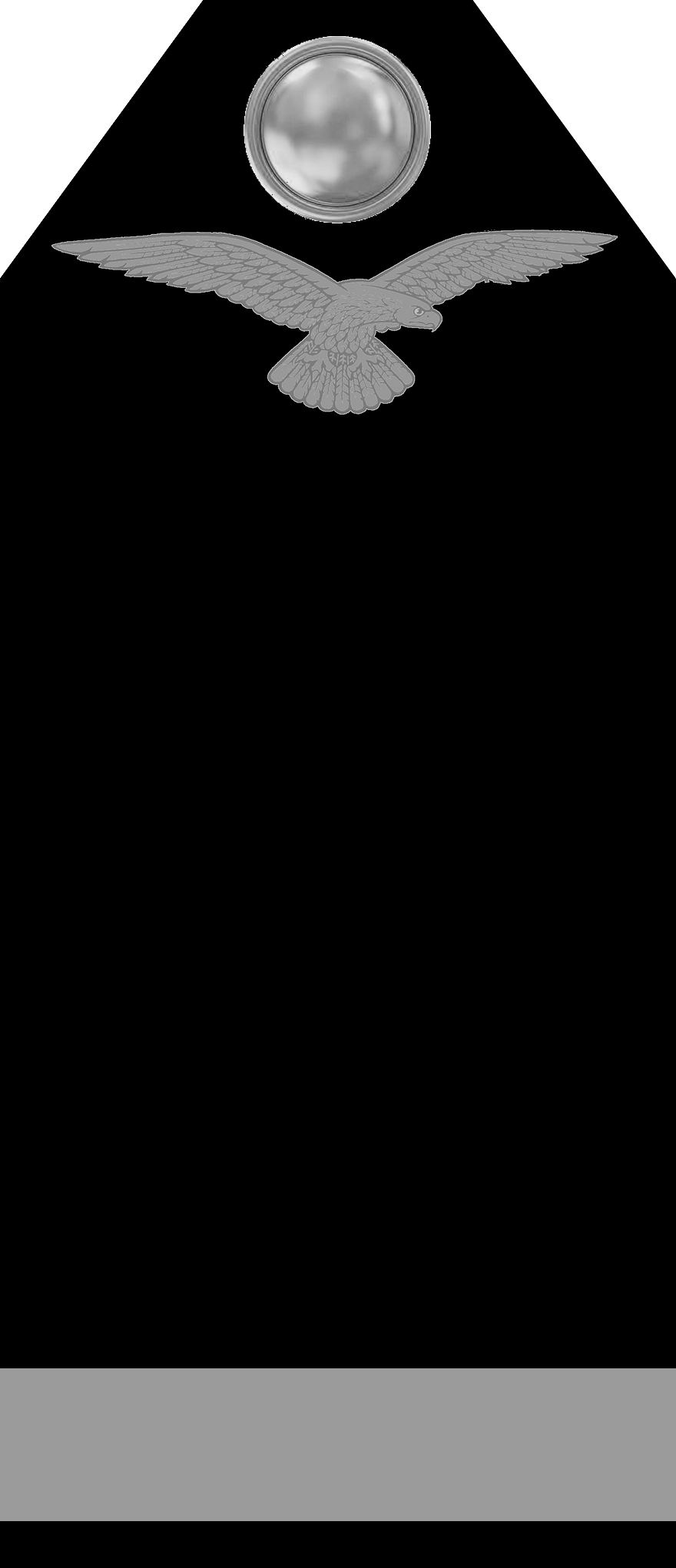
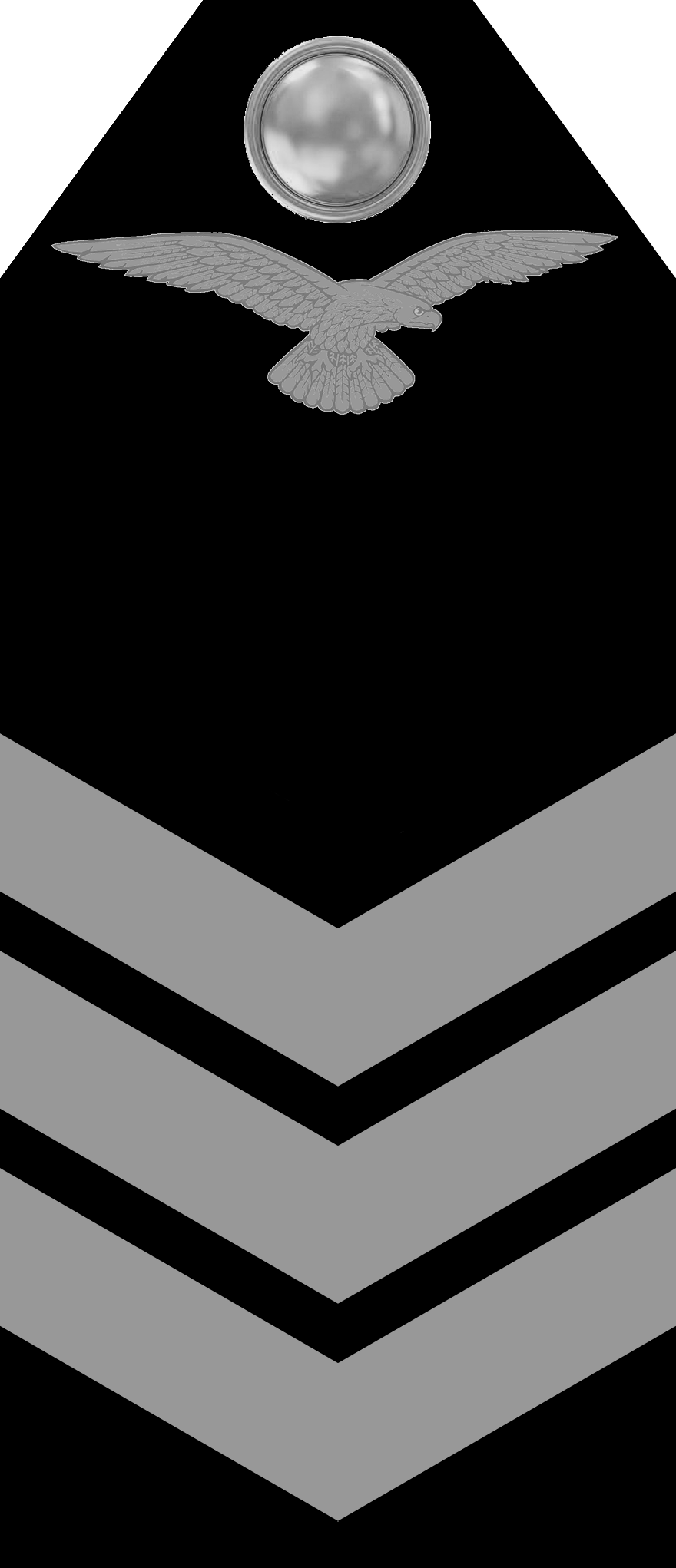
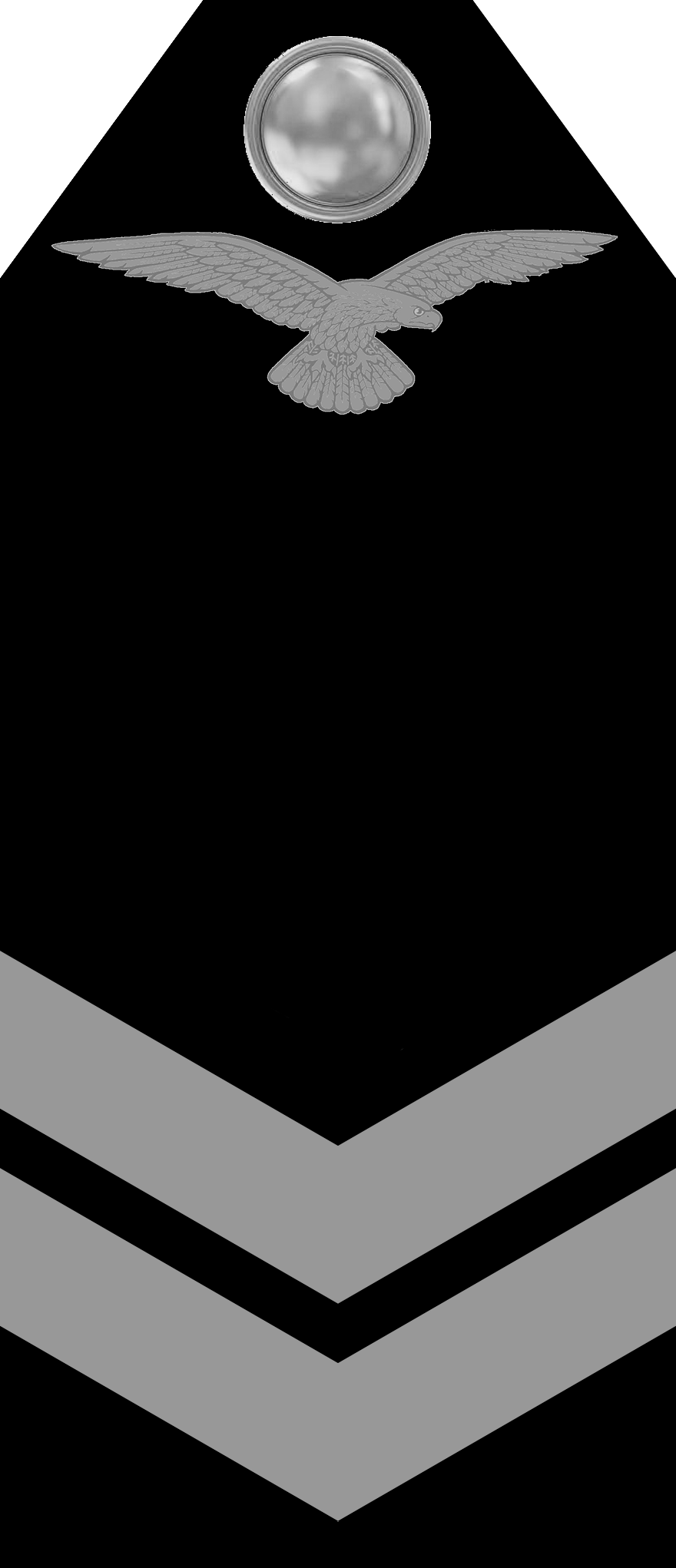
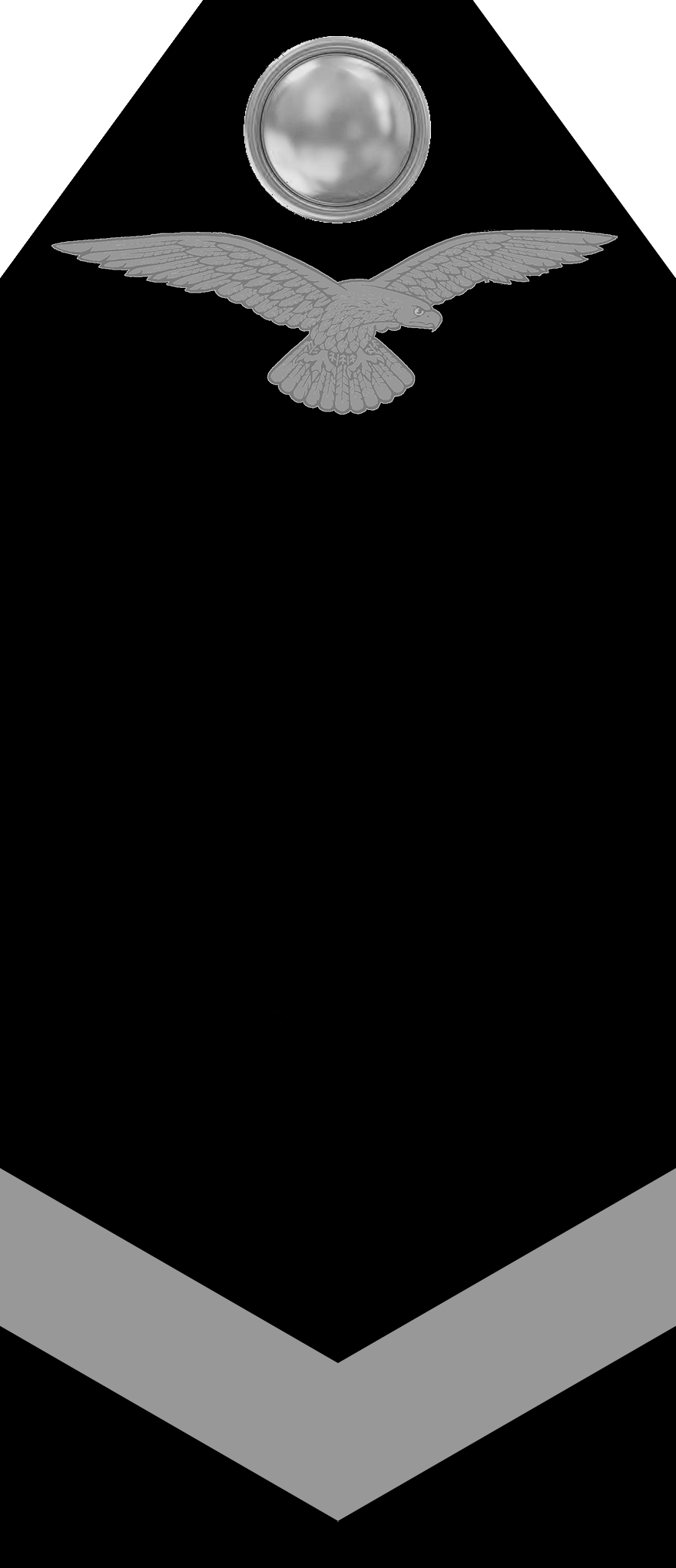
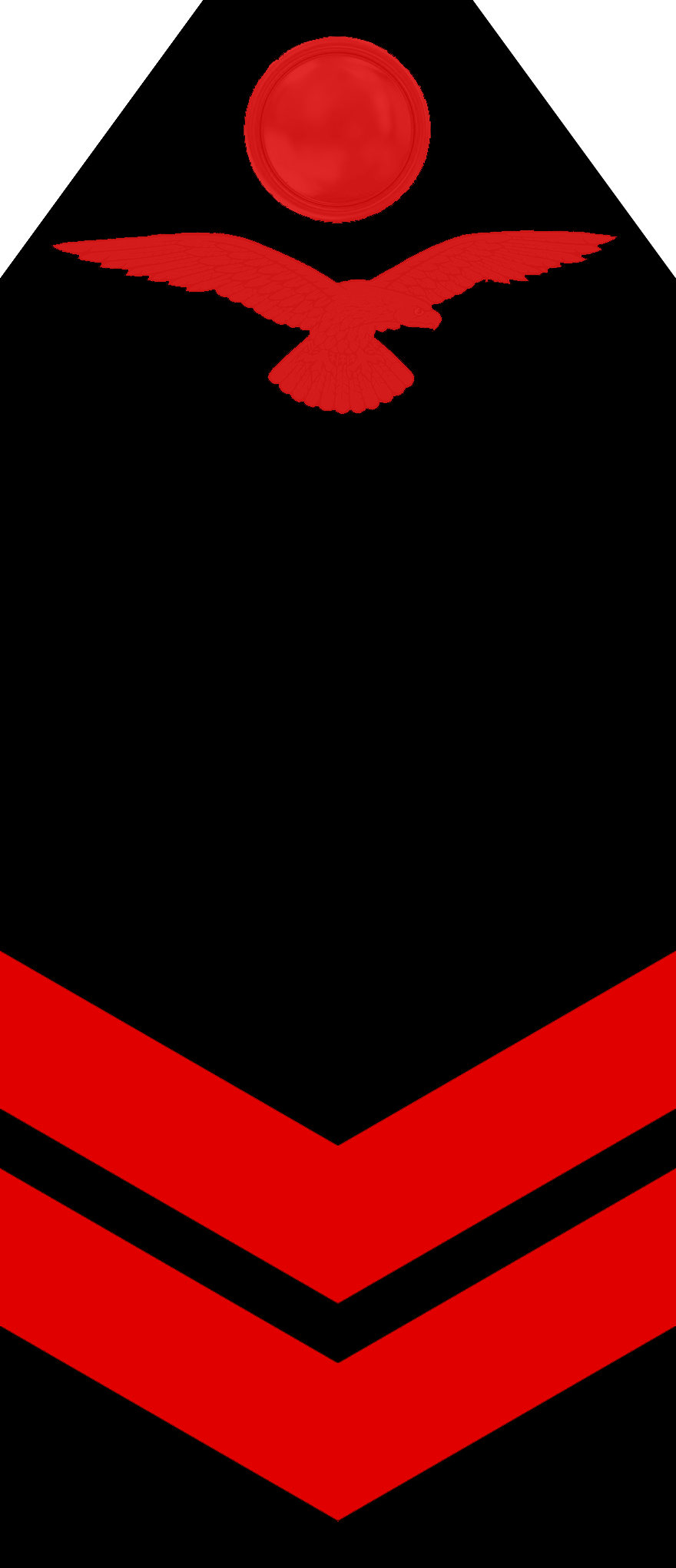
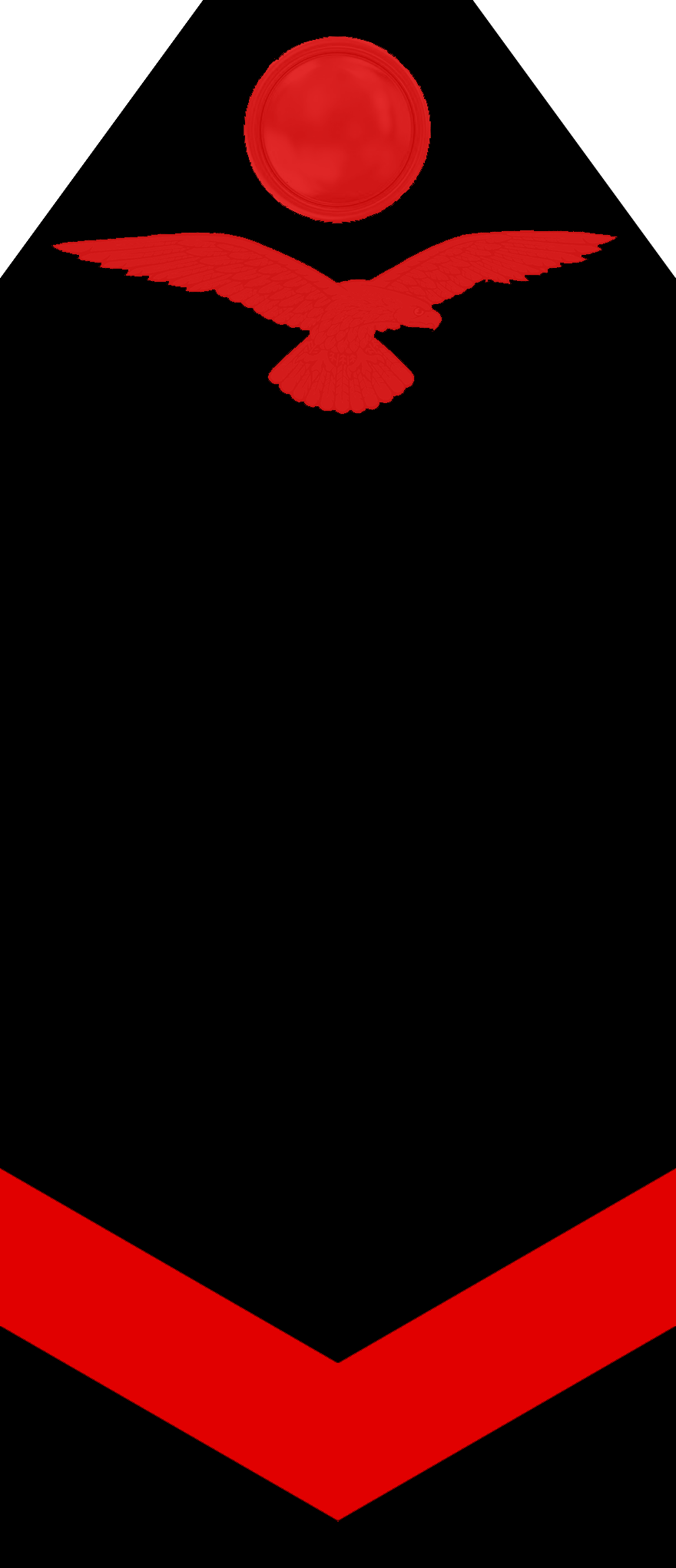
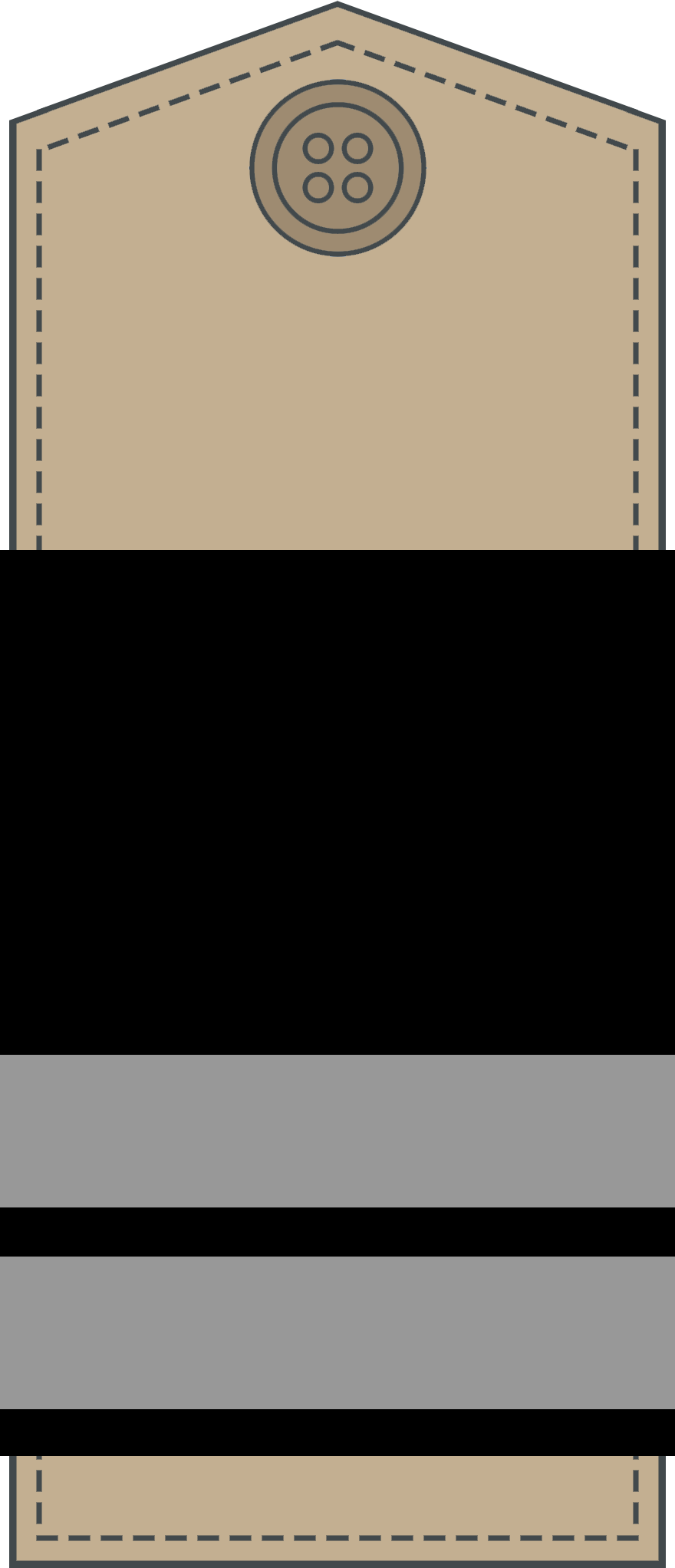
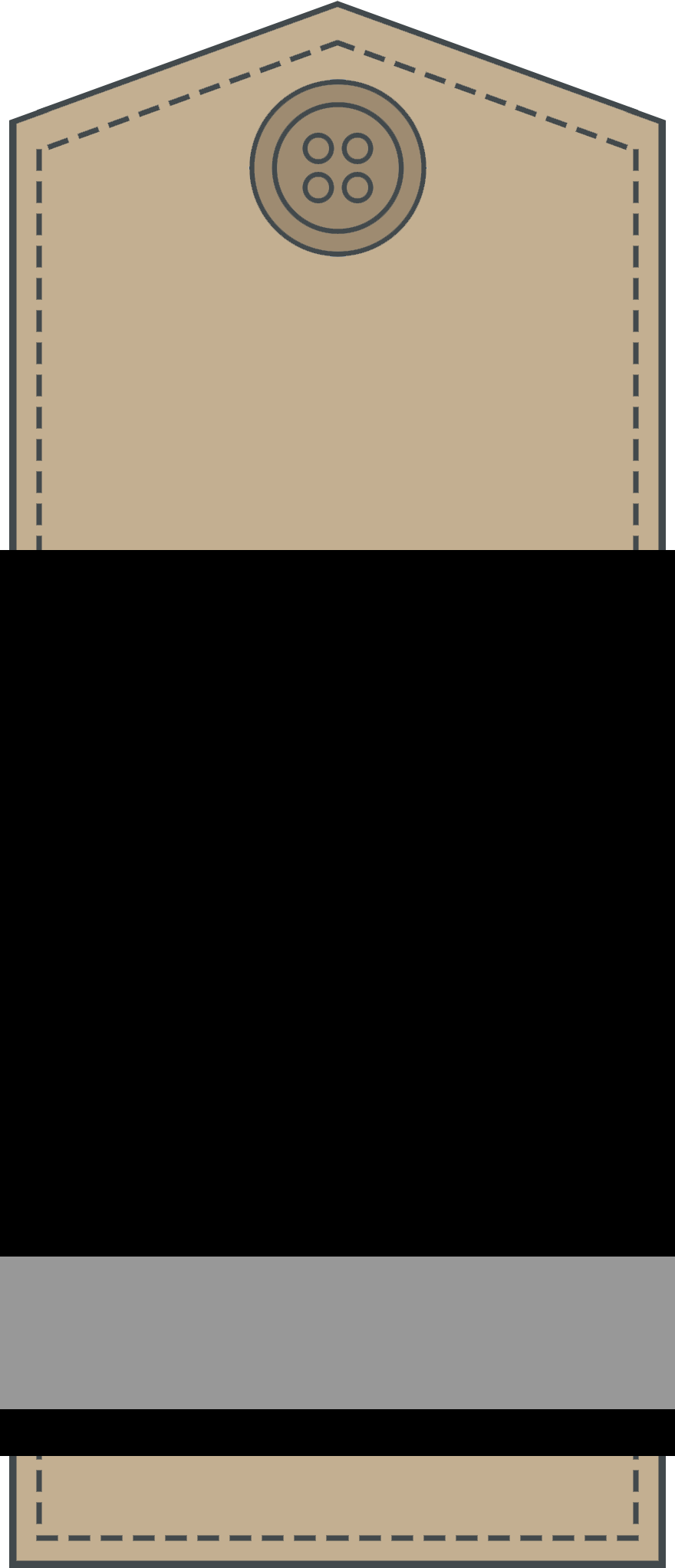
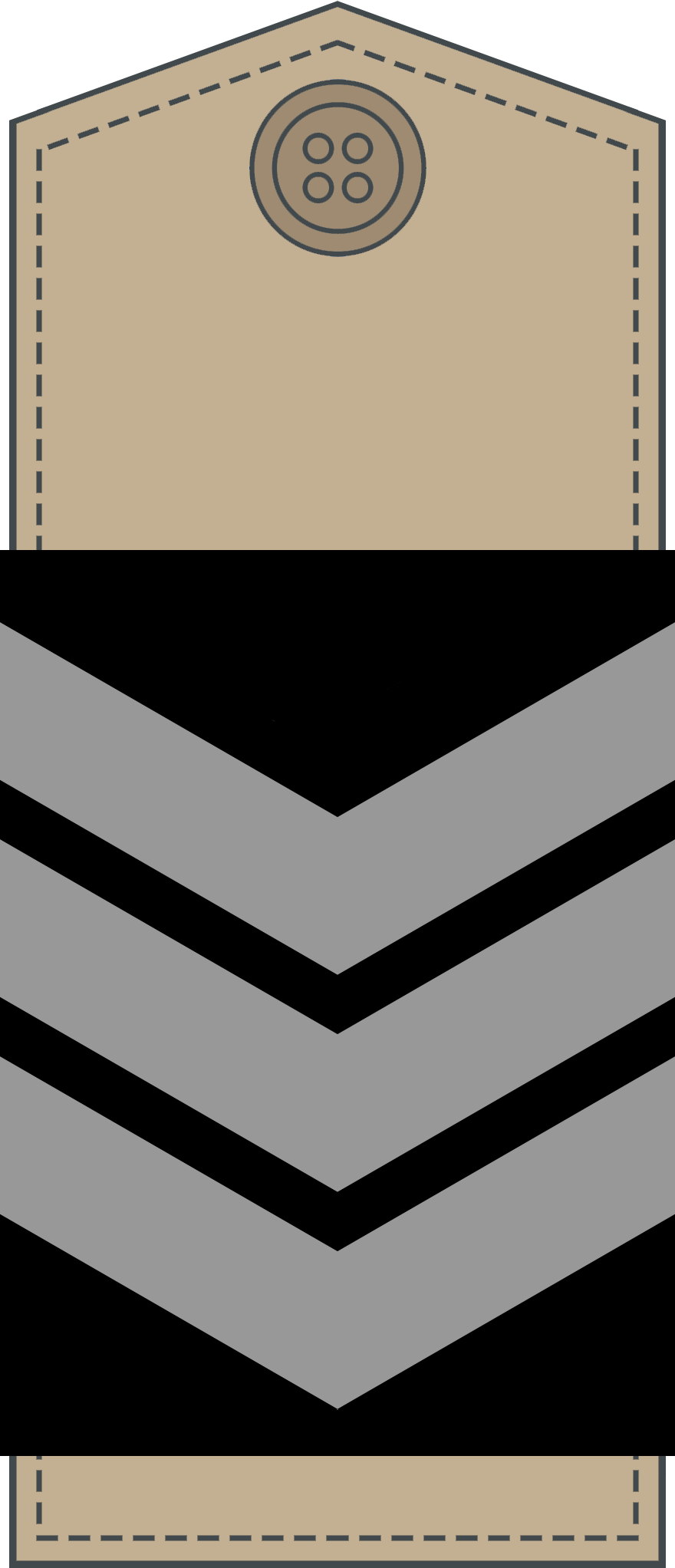
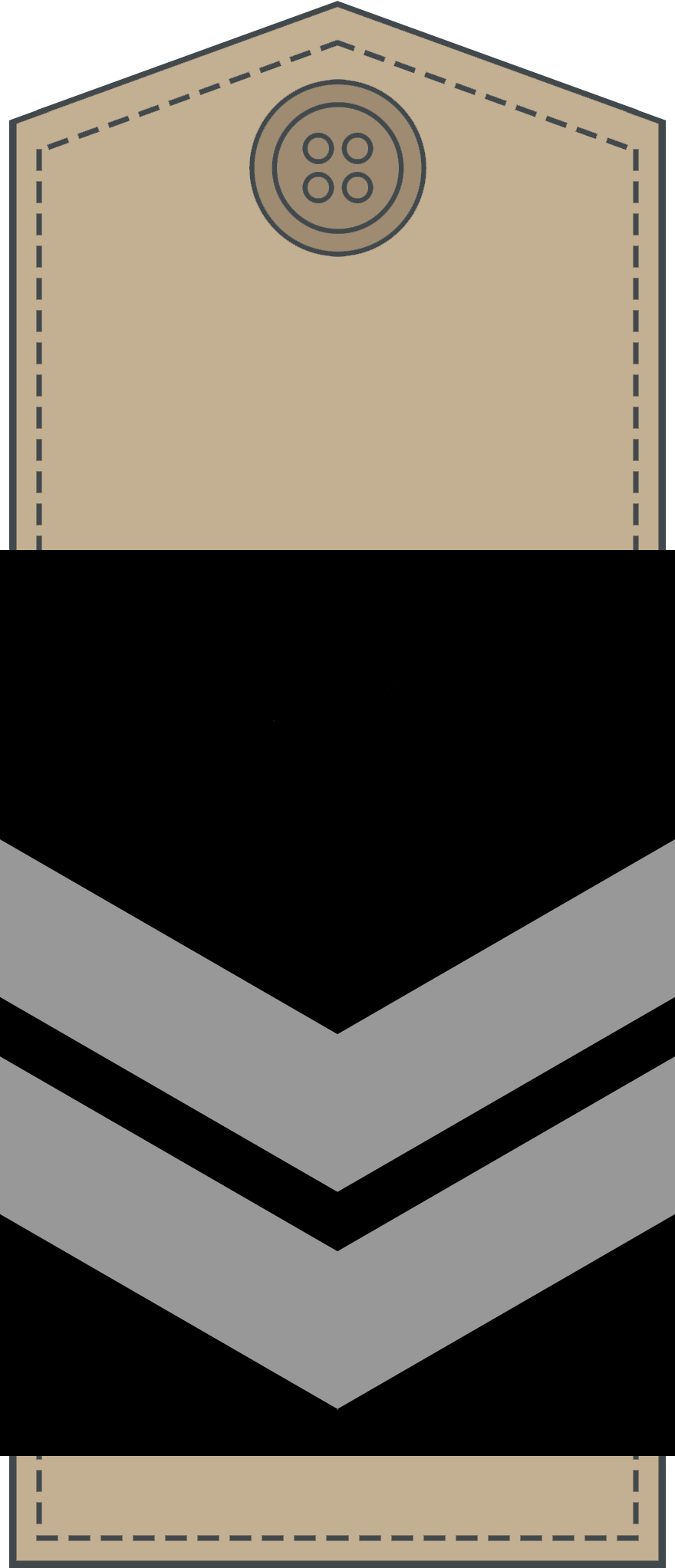
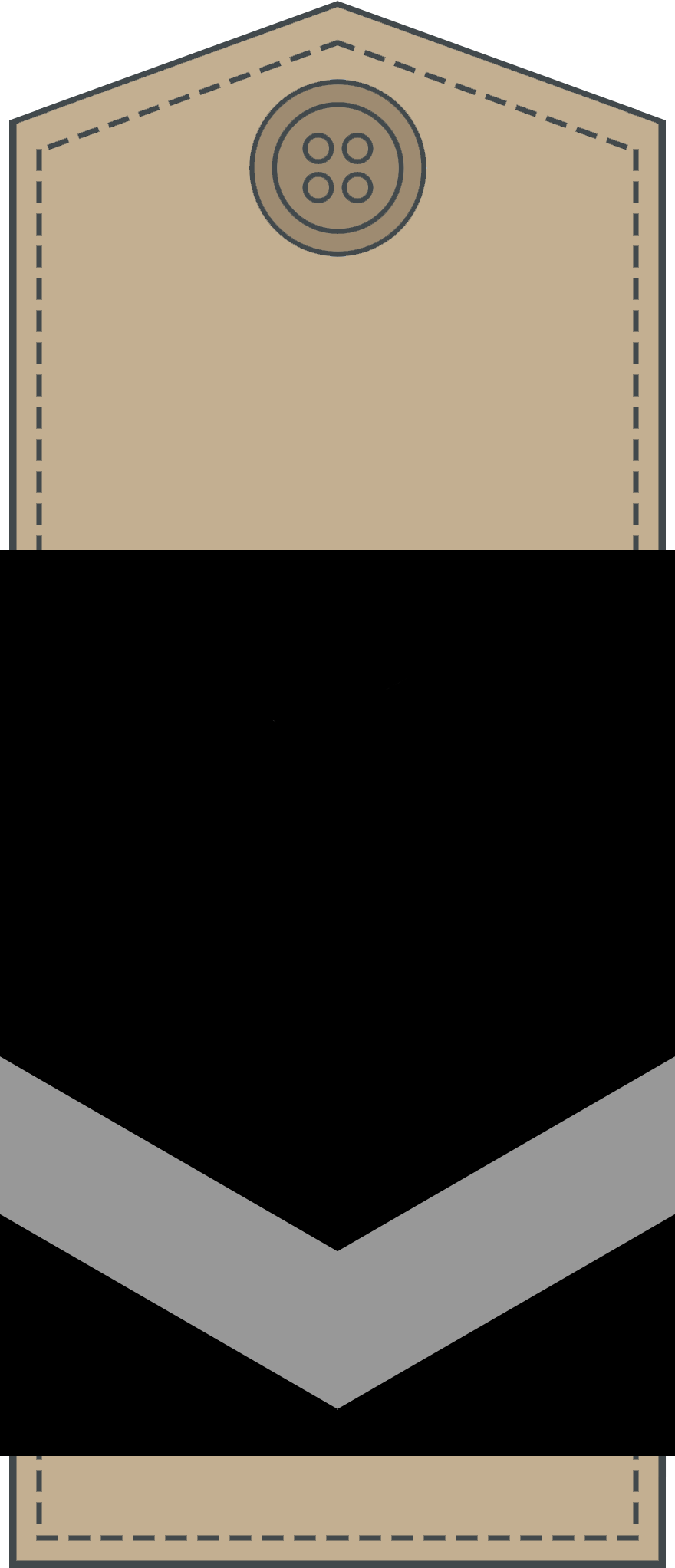
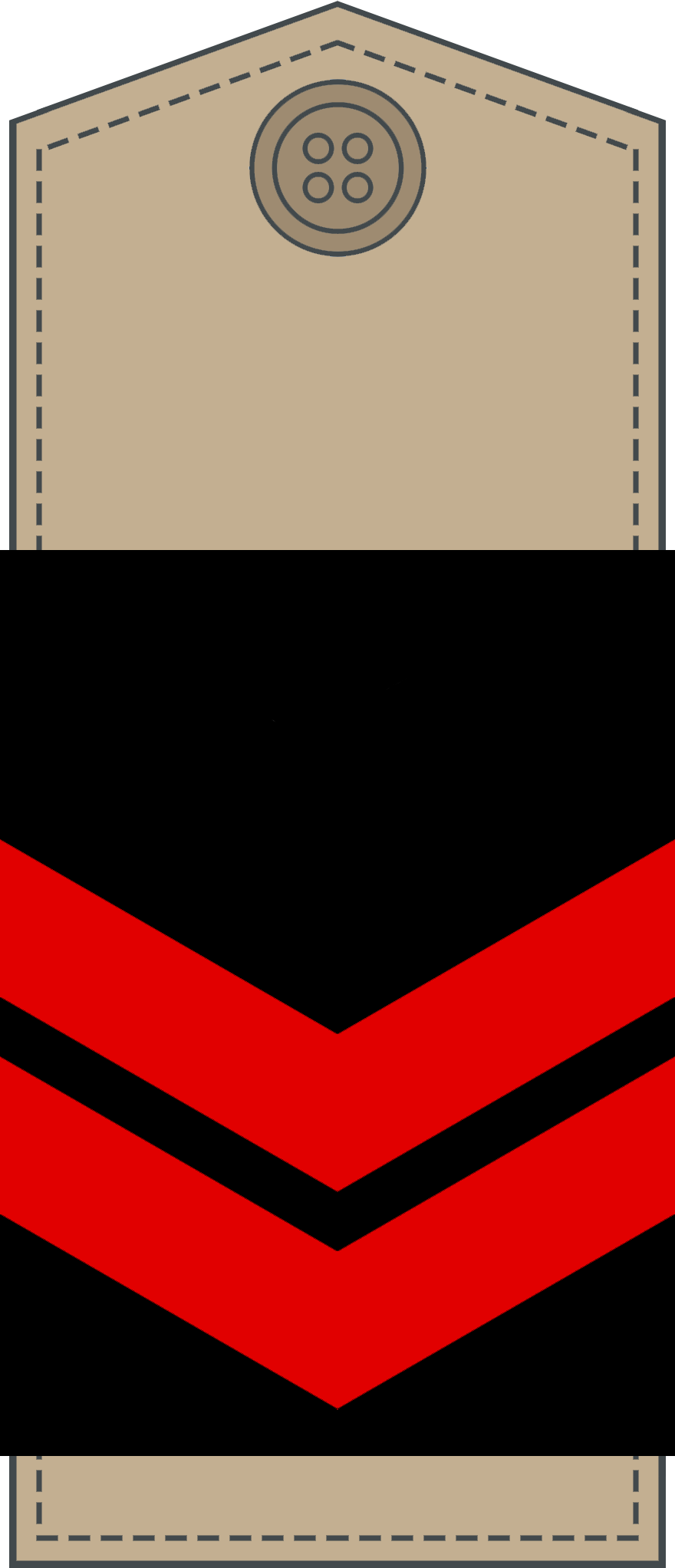
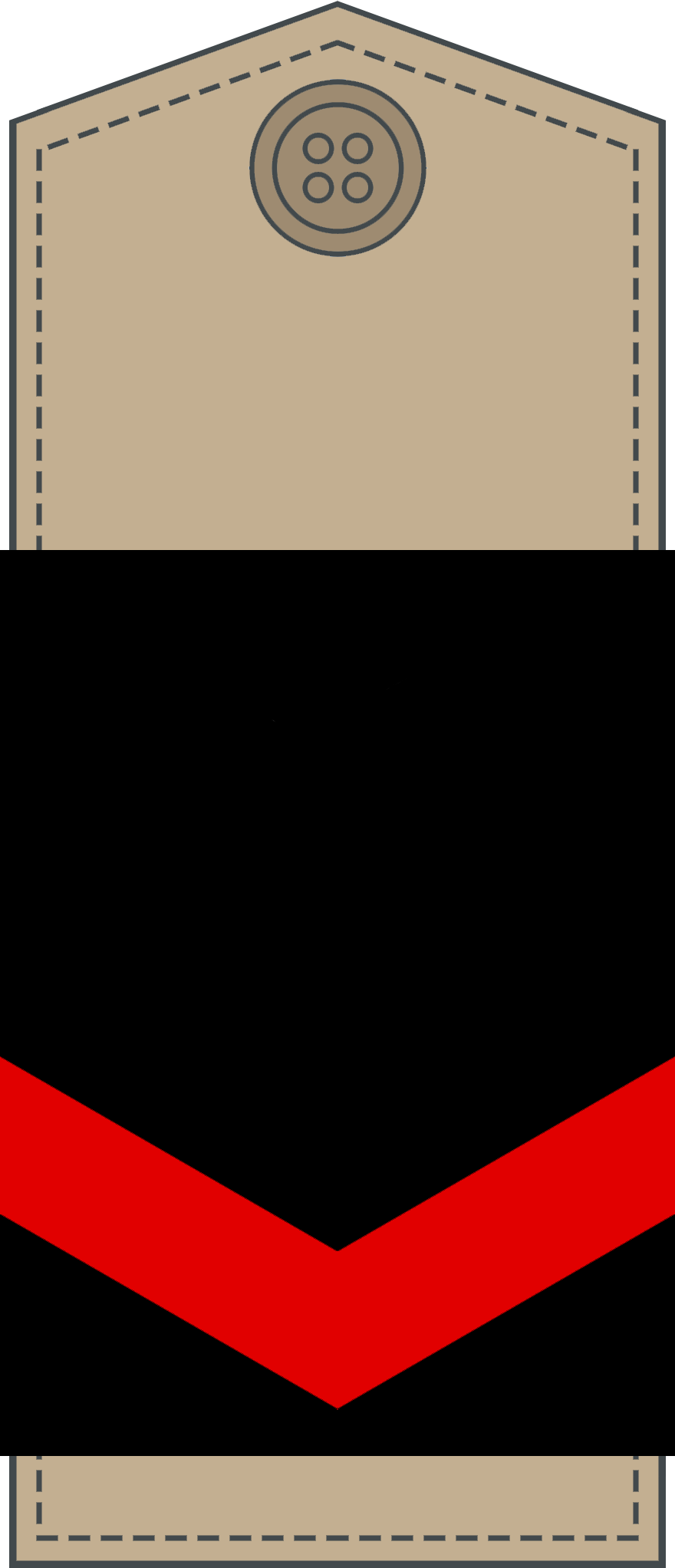
1946-1949
Rank group	Senior NCOs				Junior NCOs	Enlisted
Rank	Adjudan Oedara		Sersan Major Udara	Sersan Udara	Kopral Udara	Pradjurit Udara I	Pradjurit Kelas II
Insignia
1949-1957
Rank group	Senior NCOs				Junior NCOs	Enlisted
Rank	Letnan Moeda Udara I	Letnan Moeda Udara I	Sersan Major Udara	Sersan Udara	Kopral Udara	Pradjurit Udara I	Pradjurit Kelas II
Insignia Full dress uniform
Insignia Service dress uniform and Combat uniform

=== Ranks between 1957–1973 ===
The rank system was updated by yet another Government Regulation on 22 June 1957. The Army received the Brigadier General rank, the Navy flag officer ranks were replaced by new ones (Admiral, Vice Admiral, Rear Admiral and Commodore replacing Admiral 1st Class, Admiral 2nd Class and Admiral 3rd Class) and the Air Force flag officer ranks replaced to be similar to the Navy (with the special title "Udara"). The ranks remained Army-style in the Army and Navy and army-style ranks were formally introduced into the air force. NCOs and Enlisted ranks and ratings became different per service branch. Although the government regulation did not specifically mention rank to be used in the Naval Commando Corps, the rank system of Army was begun to be used in the Naval Commando Corps (Marine Corps today).

- Note: Enhanced Indonesian Spelling System used

Rank Category	Indonesian Army, Naval Commando Corps	Indonesian Navy	Indonesian Air Force
Generals, flag officers, air marshals	Jenderal Besar (General of the Army)	Laksamana Besar (Admiral of the Fleet)	Laksamana Besar Udara (Marshal of the Air Force)
Generals, flag officers, air marshals	Jenderal (General)	Laksamana (Admiral)	Laksamana Udara (Air Chief Marshal)
Generals, flag officers, air marshals	Letnan Jenderal (Lieutenant General)	Laksamana Madya (Vice Admiral)	Laksamana Madya Udara (Air Marshal)
Generals, flag officers, air marshals	Mayor Jenderal (formerly Jenderal Mayor) (Major General)	Laksamana Muda (Rear Admiral)	Laksamana Muda Udara (Air Vice Marshal)
Generals, flag officers, air marshals	Brigadir Jenderal (Brigadier General)	Komodor (Commodore)	Komodor Udara (Air Commodore)
Field officers	Kolonel (Colonel)	Kolonel Laut (Captain)	Kolonel Udara (Colonel)
Field officers	Letnan Kolonel (Lieutenant Colonel)	Letnan Kolonel Laut (Commander)	Letnan Kolonel Udara (Lieutenant Colonel)
Field officers	Mayor (Major)	Mayor (Lieutenant Commander)	Mayor Udara (Major)
Junior grade officers	Kapten (Captain)	Kapten (Lieutenant)	Kapten Udara (Captain)
Junior grade officers	Letnan I (First Lieutenant)	Letnan (Lieutenant junior grade)	Letnan Udara I (First Lieutenant)
Junior grade officers	Letnan II (Second Lieutenant)	Letnan Muda (Ensign)	Letnan Udara II (Second Lieutenant)
Warrant officers and non-commissioned personnel	Pembantu Letnan I (Chief Warrant Officer)	Pembantu Letnan (Warrant Officer)	Letnan Muda Udara I (Warrant Officer First Class)
Warrant officers and non-commissioned personnel	Pembantu Letnan Calon Perwira (Warrant Officer First Class)	Pembantu Letnan (Warrant Officer)	Letnan Muda Udara I (Warrant Officer First Class)
Warrant officers and non-commissioned personnel	Pembantu Letnan II (Warrant Officer Second Class)	Ajudan (Adjutant)	Letnan Muda Udara II (Warrant Officer Second Class)
Warrant officers and non-commissioned personnel	Sersan Mayor (Sergeant Major)	Sersan Mayor I (Master Chief Petty Officer)	Sersan Mayor Udara (Sergeant Major)
Warrant officers and non-commissioned personnel	Sersan Mayor (Sergeant Major)	Sersan Mayor II (Senior Chief Petty Officer)	Sersan Mayor Udara (Sergeant Major)
Warrant officers and non-commissioned personnel	Sersan Kepala (Staff Sergeant)	Sersan I (Chief Petty Officer)	Sersan Udara I (Flight Sergeant)
Warrant officers and non-commissioned personnel	Sersan I (Sergeant First Class)	Sersan I (Chief Petty Officer)	Sersan Udara I (Flight Sergeant)
Warrant officers and non-commissioned personnel	Sersan II (Sergeant)	Sersan II (Petty Officer First Class)	Sersan Udara II (Sergeant)
Enlisted personnel, ratings	Kopral Kepala (Master Corporal)	Kopral (Petty Officer Second Class)	Kopral Udara I (Corporal)
Enlisted personnel, ratings	Kopral I (Corporal)	Kopral (Petty Officer Second Class)	Kopral Udara I (Corporal)
Enlisted personnel, ratings	Kopral II (Lance Corporal)	Kopral (Petty Officer Second Class)	Kopral Udara II (Lance Corporal)
Enlisted personnel, ratings	Prajurit Kader (Specialist)	Kelasi I (Seaman)	Prajurit Udara I (Airman First Class)
Enlisted personnel, ratings	Prajurit I (Private First Class)	Kelasi I (Seaman)	Prajurit Udara I (Airman First Class)
Enlisted personnel, ratings	Prajurit II (Private)	Kelasi II (Seaman Apprentice)	Prajurit Udara II (Airman)
Enlisted personnel, ratings	Prajurit II (Private)	Kelasi III (Seaman Recruit)	Prajurit Udara II (Airman)

=== Changes between 1973–1990 ===
Government Regulation No. 24/ 1973, updated the rank system once again, the changes were as follows:

- Perwira Tinggi (PATI) (General Officers, Flag Officers, and Air Officers)
  - Ranks of General, Lieutenant General, Major General, Brigadier General are used in the Army, the Naval Commando Corps (Marine Corps today), and the Police.
  - Ranks of Admiral, Vice Admiral, and Rear Admiral are to be maintained in the Navy and the rank of Commodore (lit. 'First Admiral') reintroduced
  - Air Chief Marshal, Air Marshal, Air Vice Marshal, and Air Commodore are to be used in the Air Force
- Perwira Menengah (PAMEN) (Field Officers), used same rank system in all branches of armed forces.
- Perwira Pertama (PAMA) (Subaltern Officers), used same rank system in all branches of armed forces.
- Bintara Tinggi (BATI) (Warrant Officers), used same Army rank system in all branches of armed forces.
- Bintara (NCOs), used same rank system in all branches of armed forces.
- Tamtama (Higher Enlisted Rank or Corporal), used Navy and Air Force rank system in all branches of the armed forces.
- Tamtama (Lower Enlisted Rank or Privates)
  - Private is used in the Army, the Naval Commando Corps (Marine Corps today), and the Air Force (equivalent to Airman)
  - Seaman is used in the Navy
  - Agent/Constable is used in the Police (later restricted to the Mobile Brigade and the Marine and Air Police, all policemen in the other branches would later start directly as Sergeants)

=== Changes between 1990–1997 ===
During this period, there are minor changes of rank system in all branch of the armed forces, which are removal of rank of senior warrant officer and new enlisted ranks introduced (Master Corporal and Petty Officer 3rd Class and Specialist Private, Seaman and Senior Airman). Those changes are based on Government Regulation No.6/ 1990.

=== Changes between 1997–2010 ===
Government Regulation No. 32/ 1997 regarding the rank system of armed forces was issued. The primary difference with previous regulation were that five-star honorary rank for all branches of the armed forces was reintroduced (after a brief period in the 1950s) and warrant officers rank was re-introduced.

In 2000, with the Indonesian National Police having regained its independence from the armed forces beginning April 1999, the TNI rank system ceased to be used.

=== Current ranks 2010–present ===
Five-star honorary rank for all branches of the armed forces are no longer regulated on the latest regulation.

The ranks and rank insignia used today come from the Armed Forces rank regulations of 1990 and 1997, themselves revisions of the first rank regulations published in 1973 to use the current system. All three branches have the same rank titles at the same paygrades, except for the Perwira Tinggi (General Officers, Flag Officers, and Air Officers) and the Tamtama (Lower Rank Enlisted) of the Navy and Air Force.

== See also ==
- Indonesian National Police ranks
- Indonesian Maritime Security Agency ranks
