= History of France–United Kingdom relations =

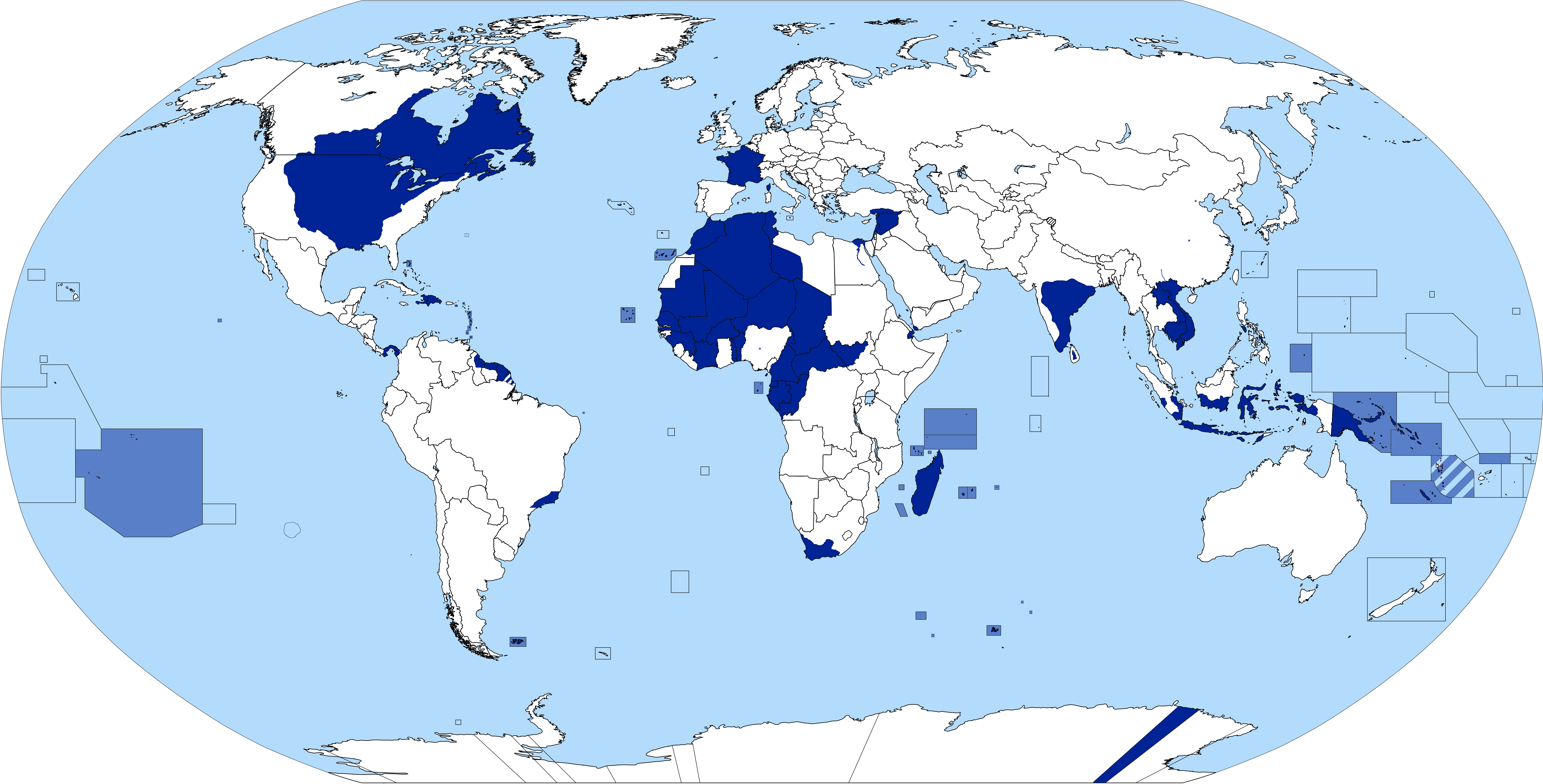
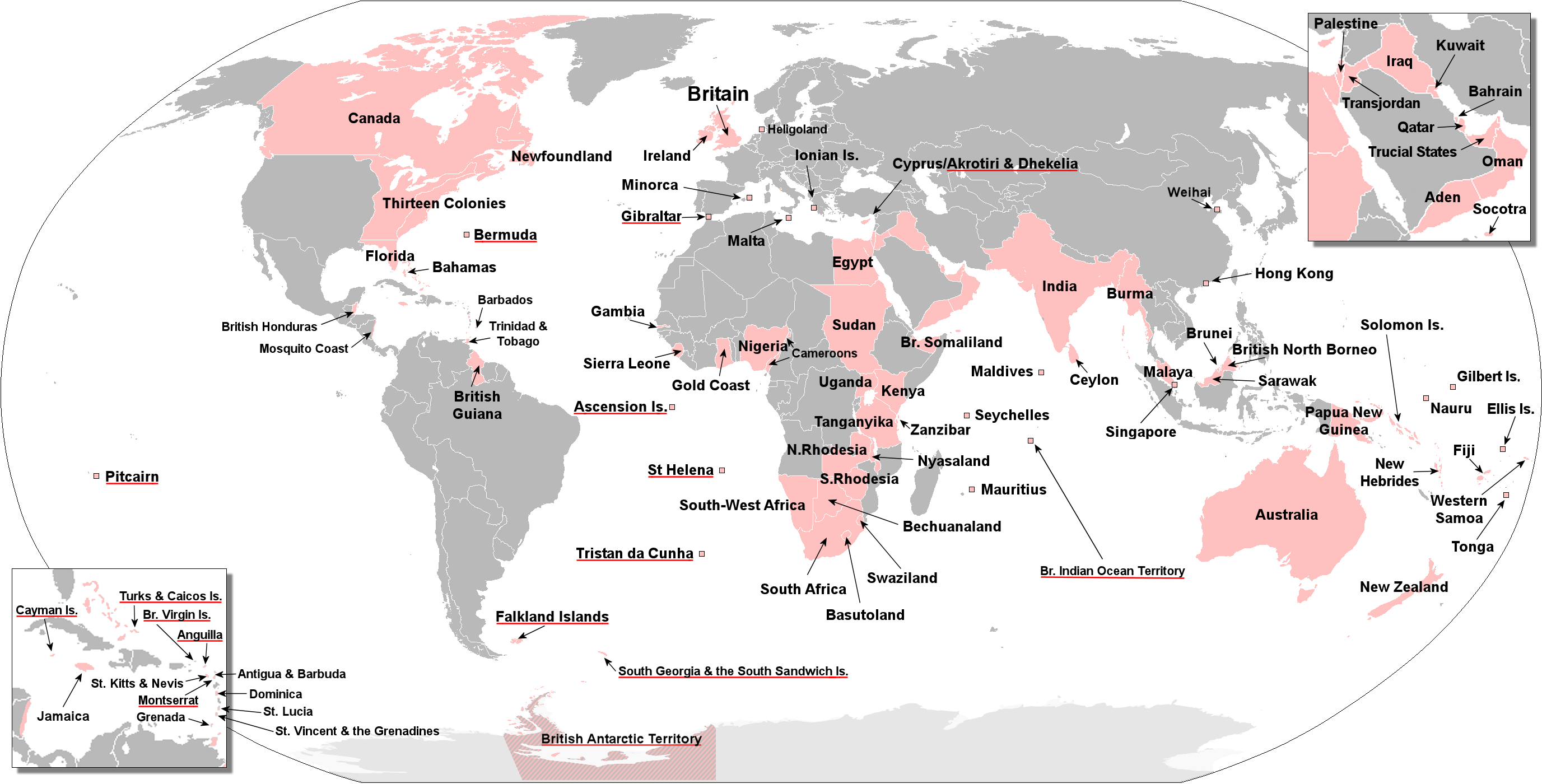
The French colonial empire (top) and British Empire (bottom)

The relationship between France and the United Kingdom was historically defined by and involved substantial enmity, but since the World Wars, has become largely friendly. In the 21st century, France and Britain, though they have chosen different paths and share many overlooked similarities (with roughly the same population, economic size, commitment to democracy, diplomatic clout, and as heads of former global empires.), are often still referred to as "historic rivals", with a perceived ever-lasting competition.

== Ancient era ==
=== Roman and post-Roman era ===
When Julius Caesar invaded Gaul, he encountered allies of the Gauls and Belgae from southeastern Britain offering assistance, some of whom even acknowledged the king of the Belgae as their sovereign.

All the peoples concerned were Celts (as the Germanic Angles and Franks had not yet invaded either country that would later bear their names), this could arguably be seen as the first major example of cross channel co-operation in recorded history. As a consequence, Caesar felt compelled to invade, in an attempt to subdue Britain. Rome was reasonably successful at conquering Gaul, Britain and Belgica; and all three areas became provinces of the Roman Empire.

For the next five hundred years, there was much interaction between the two regions, as both Britain and France were under Roman rule. After the fall of the Western Roman Empire, this was followed by another five hundred years with very little interaction between the two, as both were invaded by different Germanic tribes. Anglo-Saxons invaded southern Britain and established several kingdoms, intermixing and assimilating the local Brythonic population during the process, as well as the later Viking invasions of the British Isles. France saw intermixture with and partial conquest by Germanic tribes such as the Salian Franks to create the Frankish kingdoms. Christianity as a religion spread through all areas involved during this period, replacing the Germanic, Celtic and pre-Celtic forms of worship. The deeds of chieftains in this period would produce the legendaria around King Arthur and Camelot – now believed to be a legend based on the deeds of many early medieval British chieftains – and the more historically verifiable Charlemagne, the Frankish king who founded the Holy Roman Empire throughout much of Western Europe. At the turn of the second millennium, the British Isles were primarily involved with the Scandinavian world, while France's main foreign relationship was with the Holy Roman Empire.

== Medieval era ==
=== Before the Conquest ===
Prior to the Norman Conquest of 1066, there were no armed conflicts between the Kingdom of England and the Kingdom of France. France and England were subject to repeated Viking invasions, and their foreign preoccupations were primarily directed toward Scandinavia.

Such cross-Channel relations as England had were directed toward Normandy, a quasi-independent fief owing homage to the French king; Emma, daughter of Normandy's Duke Richard, became queen to two English kings in succession; two of her sons, Harthacnut and Edward the Confessor later became kings of England. Edward spent much of his early life (1013–1041) in Normandy and, as king, favoured certain Normans with high office, such as Robert of Jumièges, who became Archbishop of Canterbury.

This gradual Normanization of the realm set the stage for the Norman Conquest, in which Emma's brother's grandson, William, Duke of Normandy, gained the kingdom in the first successful cross-Channel invasion since Roman times. Together with its new ruler, England acquired the foreign policy of the Norman dukes, which was based on protecting and expanding Norman interests at the expense of the French kings. Although William's rule over Normandy had initially had the backing of King Henry I of France, William's success had soon created hostility, and in 1054 and 1057, King Henry had twice attacked Normandy.

=== Norman Conquest ===
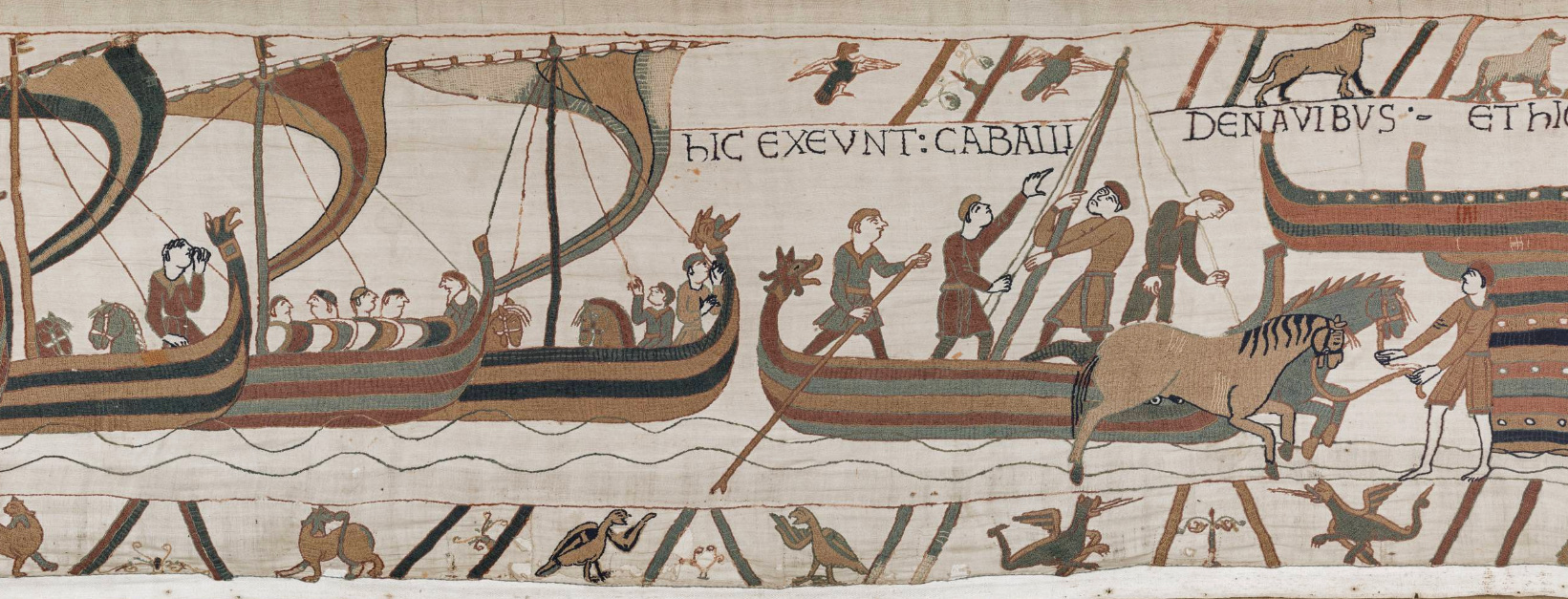
Scene from the Bayeux Tapestry depicting ships grounding and horses landing in England

However, in the mid-eleventh century, there was a dispute over the English throne, and the French-speaking Normans, who were of Viking, Frankish, and Gallo-Roman stock, invaded England under their duke William the Conqueror and took over following the Battle of Hastings in 1066, and crowned themselves Kings of England. The Normans took control of the land and the political system. Feudal culture took root in England, and for the next 150 years England was generally considered of secondary importance to the dynasty's Continental territories, notably in Normandy and other western French provinces. The official language of the aristocracy was French for nearly three hundred years after the Norman Conquest. Many French words were adopted into the English language as a result. About 30% of the English language is derived from or through various forms of French. The first Norman kings were also the Dukes of Normandy, so relations were somewhat complicated between the countries. Though they were dukes ostensibly under the king of France, their higher level of organisation in Normandy gave them more de facto power. In addition, they were kings of England in their own right; England was not officially a province of France, nor a province of Normandy.

=== Breton War, 1076–1077 ===
This war was fought between the years 1076 to 1077.

=== Vexin War, 1087 ===
In 1087, following the monastic retirement of its last count, William and Philip partitioned between themselves the Vexin, a small but strategically important county on the middle Seine that controlled the traffic between Paris and Rouen, the French and Norman capitals. With this buffer state eliminated, Normandy and the king's royal demesne (the Île-de-France) now directly bordered on each other, and the region would be the flashpoint for several future wars. In 1087, William responded to border raids conducted by Philip's soldiers by attacking the town of Mantes, during the sack of which he received an accidental injury that turned fatal.

=== Rebellion of 1088 ===
With William's death, his realms were parted between his two sons (England to William Rufus, Normandy to Robert Curthose) and the Norman-French border war concluded. Factional strains between the Norman barons, faced with a double loyalty to William's two sons, created a brief civil war in which an attempt was made to force Rufus off the English throne. With the failure of the rebellion, England and Normandy were clearly divided for the first time since 1066.

=== Wars in the Vexin and Maine, 1097–1098 ===
Robert Curthose left on crusade in 1096, and for the duration of his absence Rufus took over the administration of Normandy. Soon afterwards (1097) he attacked the Vexin and the next year the County of Maine. Rufus succeeded in defeating Maine, but the war in the Vexin ended inconclusively with a truce in 1098.

=== Anglo-Norman War, 1101 ===
In August 1100, William Rufus was killed by an arrow shot while hunting. His younger brother, Henry Beauclerc immediately took the throne. It had been expected to go to Robert Curthose, Duke of Normandy, but Robert was away on a crusade and did not return until a month after Rufus' death, by which time Henry was firmly in control of England, and his accession had been recognised by France's King Philip. Robert was, however, able to reassert his control over Normandy, though only after giving up the County of Maine.

England and Normandy were now in the hands of the two brothers, Henry and Robert. In July 1101, Robert launched an attack on England from Normandy. He landed successfully at Portsmouth, and advanced inland to Alton in Hampshire. There he and Henry came to an agreement to accept the status quo of the territorial division. Henry was freed from his homage to Robert, and agreed to pay the Duke an annual sum (which, however, he only paid until 1103).

=== Anglo-Norman War, 1105–1106 ===
Following increasing tensions between the brothers, and evidence of the weakness of Robert's rule, Henry I invaded Normandy in the spring of 1105, landing at Barfleur. The ensuing Anglo-Norman war was longer and more destructive, involving sieges of Bayeux and Caen; but Henry had to return to England in the late summer, and it was not until the following summer that he was able to resume the conquest of Normandy. In the interim, Duke Robert took the opportunity to appeal to his liege lord, King Philip, but could obtain no aid from him. The fate of Robert and the duchy was sealed at the Battle of Tinchebray on 28 or 29 September 1106: Robert was captured and imprisoned for the rest of his life. Henry was now, like his father, both King of England and Duke of Normandy, and the stage was set for a new round of conflict between England and France.

=== Anglo-French War, 1117–1120 ===
In 1108, Philip I, who had been king of France since before the Norman Conquest, died and was succeeded by his son Louis VI, who had already been conducting the administration of the realm in his father's name for several years.

Louis had initially been hostile to Robert Curthose, and friendly to Henry I; but with Henry's acquisition of Normandy, the old Norman-French rivalries re-emerged. From 1109 to 1113, clashes erupted in the Vexin; and in 1117 Louis made a pact with Baldwin VII of Flanders, Fulk V of Anjou, and various rebellious Norman barons to overthrow Henry's rule in Normandy and replace him with William Clito, Curthose's son. By luck and diplomacy, however, Henry eliminated the Flemings and Angevins from the war, and on 20 August 1119 at the Battle of Bremule he defeated the French. Louis was obliged to accept Henry's rule in Normandy, and accepted his son William Adelin's homage for the fief in 1120.

=== High Middle Ages ===
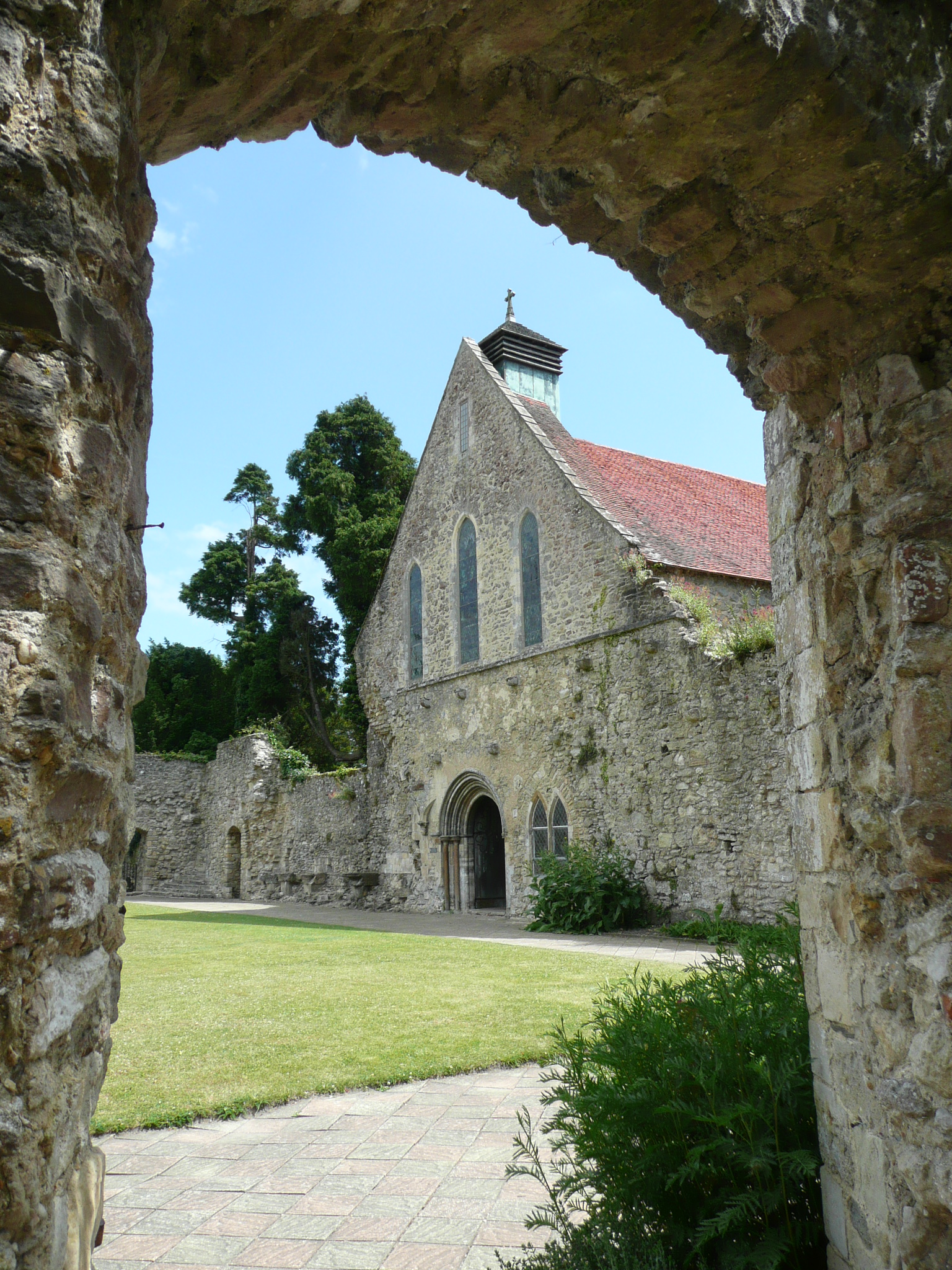
Beaulieu Abbey, founded by King John of England for Cistercians, a religious order from France who gave the Abbey its present name, French for "beautiful place"

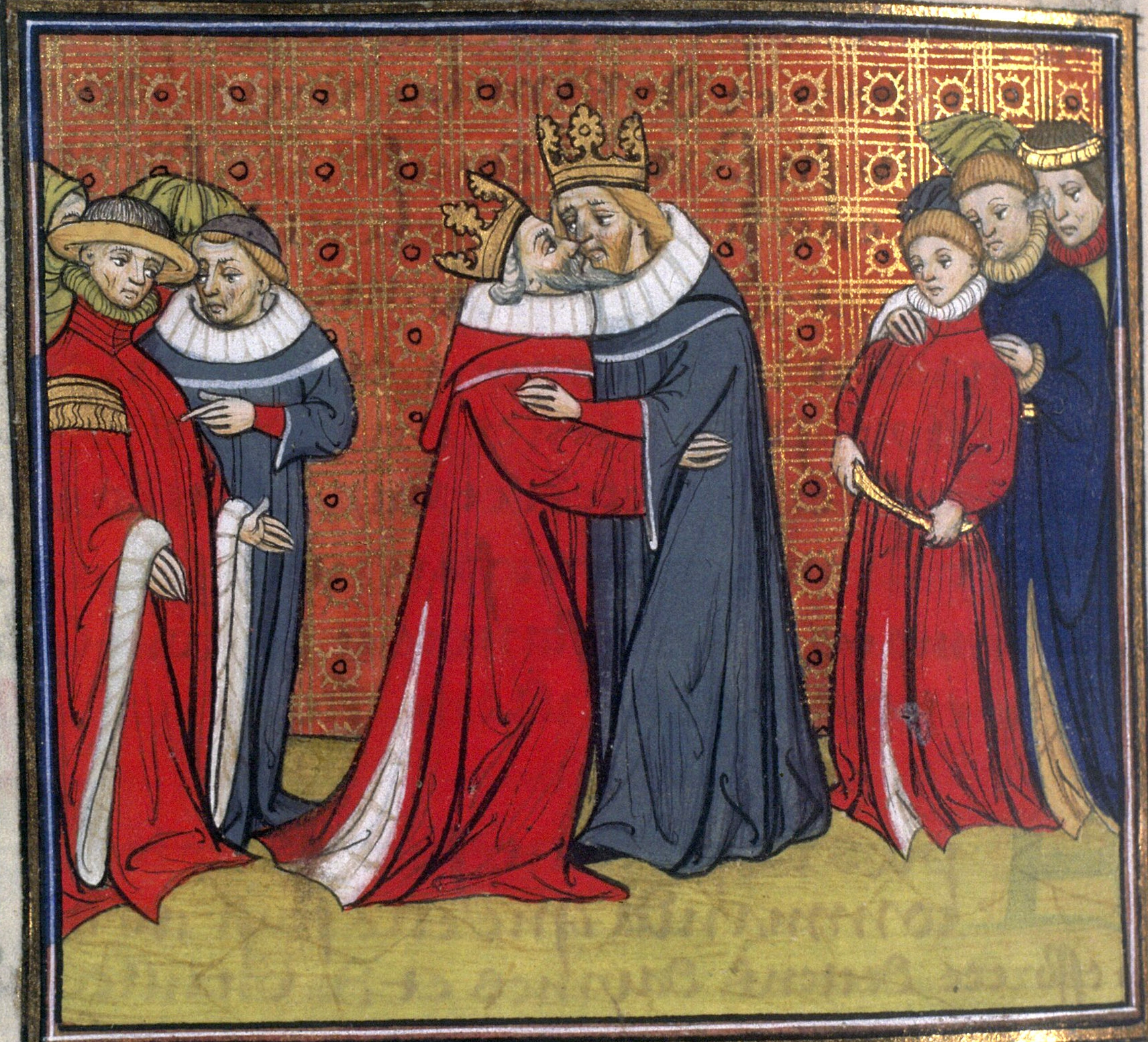
Edward I of England paying homage to Philip IV of France c. 1293

During the reign of the closely related Plantagenet dynasty, which was based in its Angevin Empire, and at the height of the empires size, 1/3 of France was under Angevin control as well as all of England. However, almost all of the Angevin empire was lost to Philip II of France under Richard the Lionheart, John and Henry III of England. The latter finally gave the English a clear identity as an Anglo-Saxon people under a firmly Anglicized (though Francophone, but not French), crown. Henry III was an admirer of Edward the Confessor, and is recorded to have made an effort to learn Old English, as would Edward I.

While the English and French had been frequently acrimonious, they had always had a common culture and little fundamental difference in identity. Nationalism had been minimal in days when most wars took place between rival feudal lords on a sub-national scale. The last attempt to unite the two cultures under such lines was probably a failed French-supported rebellion to depose Edward II. It was also during the Middle Ages that a Franco-Scottish alliance, known as the Auld Alliance was signed by King John of Scotland and Philip IV of France.

=== The Hundred Years' War ===
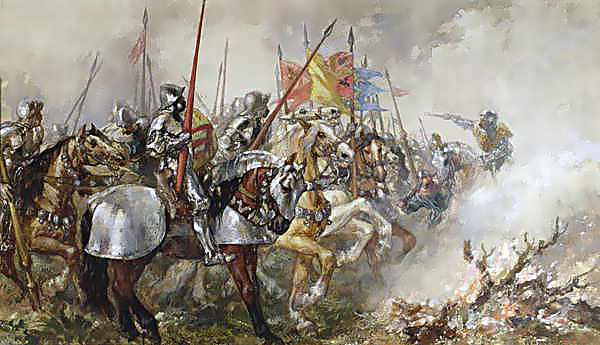
During the Hundred Years' War England and France battled for supremacy. Following the Battle of Agincourt the English gained control of vast French territory, but were eventually driven out. English monarchs would still claim the throne of France until 1800.

The English monarchy increasingly integrated with its subjects and turned to the English language wholeheartedly during the Hundred Years' War between 1337 and 1453. Though the war was in principle a mere dispute over territory, it drastically changed societies on both sides of the Channel. The English, although already politically united, for the first time found pride in their language and identity, while the French united politically.

Several of the most famous Anglo-French battles took place during the Hundred Years' War: Crécy, Poitiers, Agincourt, Orléans, Patay, Formigny and Castillon. Major sources of French pride stemmed from their leadership during the war. Bertrand du Guesclin was a brilliant tactician who forced the English out of the lands they had procured at the Treaty of Brétigny, a compromising treaty that most Frenchmen saw as a humiliation. Joan of Arc was another unifying figure who to this day represents a combination of religious fervour and French patriotism to all France. After her inspirational victory at Orléans and what many saw as Joan's martyrdom at the hands of Burgundians and Englishmen, Jean de Dunois eventually forced the English out of all of France except Calais, which was only lost in 1558. Apart from setting national identities, the Hundred Years' War was the root of the traditional rivalry and at times hatred between the two countries. During this era, the English lost their last territories in France, except Calais, which would remain in English hands for another 105 years, though the English monarchs continued to style themselves as Kings of France until 1800.

=== The Franco-Scots Alliance ===
France and Scotland agreed to defend each other in the event of an attack on either from England in several treaties, the most notable of which were in 1327 and 1490. There had always been intermarriage between the Scottish and French royal households, but this solidified the bond between the royals even further. Scottish historian J. B. Black took a critical view, arguing regarding the alliance:

The Scots...love for their 'auld' ally had never been a positive sentiment nourished by community of culture, but an artificially created affection resting on the negative basis of enmity to England.

== Modern era ==
=== The early modern period ===
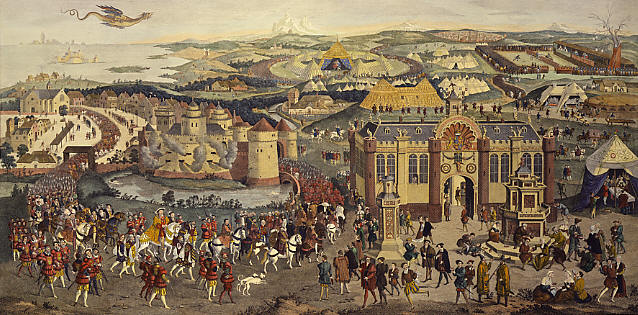
Henry VIII and Francis I met at the Field of the Cloth of Gold in 1519, briefly marking a period of détente between the two nations

The English and French were engaged in numerous wars in the following centuries. They took opposite sides in all of the Italian Wars between 1494 and 1559.

An even deeper division set in during the English Reformation, when most of England converted to Protestantism and France remained Roman Catholic. This enabled each side to see the other as not only a foreign evil but also a heretical one. In both countries there was intense civil religious conflict. Because of the oppression by Roman Catholic King Louis XIII, many Protestant Huguenots fled to England. Similarly, many Catholics fled from England to France. Scotland had a very close relationship with France in the 16th century, with intermarriage at the highest level.

Henry VIII had initially sought an alliance with France, and the Field of the Cloth of Gold saw a face to face meeting between him and King Francis I of France. Mary, Queen of Scots (1542–1587) was born to King James V and his French second wife, Mary of Guise and became Queen when her father was killed in the wars with England. Her mother became Regent, brought in French advisors, and ruled Scotland in the French style. David Ditchburn and Alastair MacDonald argue:

Protestantism was, however, given an enormous boost in Scotland, especially among the governing classes, by the suffocating political embrace of Catholic France. The threat to Scotland's independence seem to come most potently from France, not England... And absorption by France was not a future that appealed to Scots.

Queen Elizabeth I, whose own legitimacy was challenged by Mary Queen of Scots, worked with the Protestant Scottish Lords to expel the French from Scotland in 1560. The Treaty of Edinburgh in 1560 virtually ended the "auld alliance." Protestant Scotland tied its future to Protestant England, rejecting Catholic France. However, friendly relations at the business level did continue.

=== 17th century ===
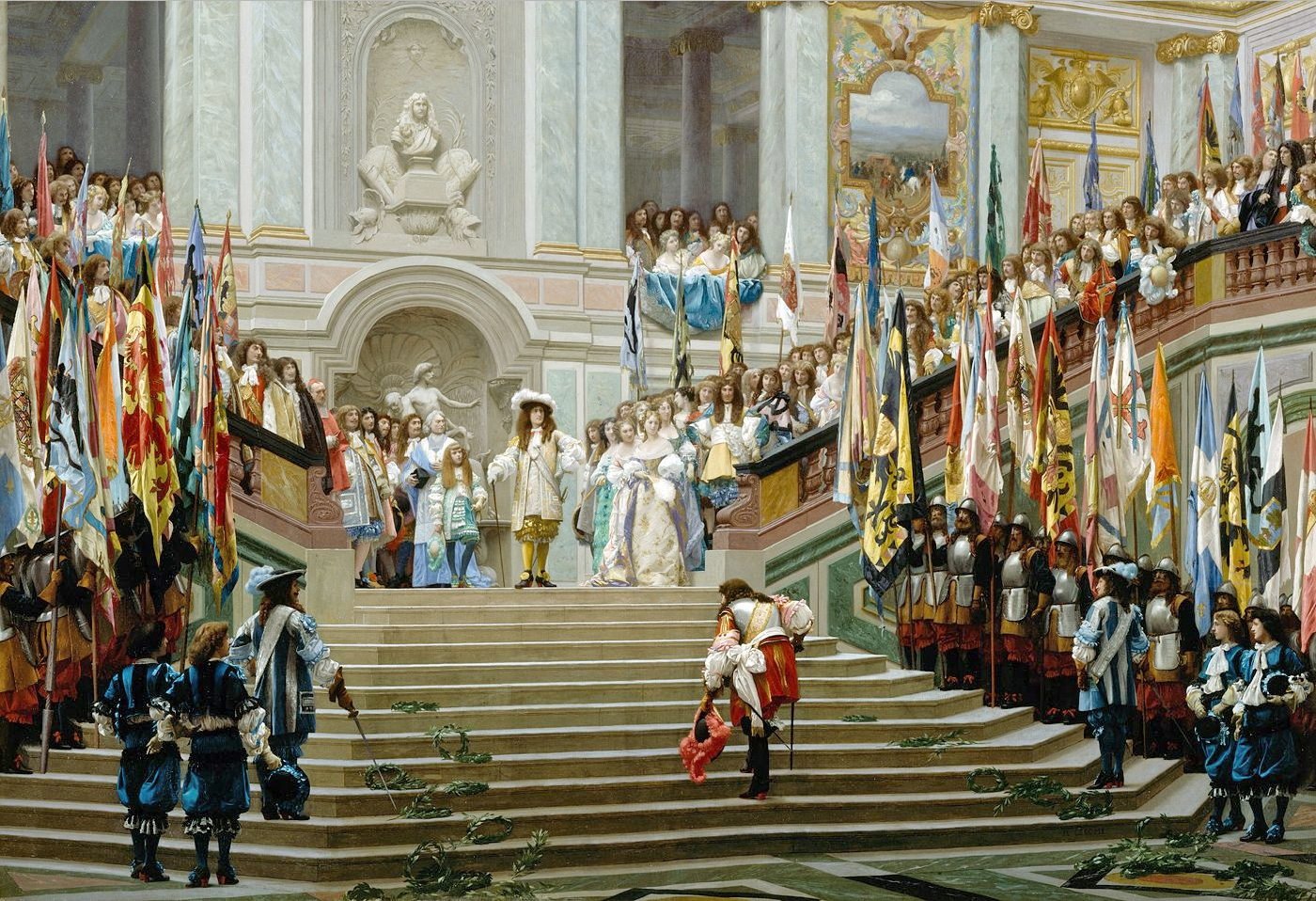
The English feared that King Louis XIV would dominate Europe, and devoted their efforts to frustrating this goal.

While Spain had been the dominant world power in the sixteenth and early seventeenth centuries, the English had often sided with France as a counterweight against them. This design was intended to keep a European balance of power, and prevent one country gaining overwhelming supremacy. France replaced Spain as the dominant power after 1650 so the basis of English strategy was the fear that a French universal monarchy of Europe would be able to overwhelm the British Isles.

At the conclusion of the English Civil War, the newly formed Republic under Oliver Cromwell, "the Commonwealth of England" joined sides with the French against Spain during the last decade of the Franco-Spanish War (1635–1659). The English were particularly interested in the troublesome city of Dunkirk and in accordance with the alliance the city was given to the English after the Battle of the Dunes (1658), but after the monarchy was restored in England, Charles II sold it back to the French in 1662 for £320,000.

Following the conclusion of the Thirty Years' War (1618–1648) Treaty of Westphalia in 1648, and as France finally overcame its rebellious "princes of the blood" and Protestant Huguenots, the long fought wars of the Fronde (civil wars) finally came to an end. At the same time Spain's power was severely weakened by decades of wars and rebellions – and France, began to take on a more assertive role under King Louis XIV with an expansionist policy both in Europe and across the globe. English foreign policy was now directed towards preventing France gaining supremacy on the continent and creating a universal monarchy. To the French, England was an isolated and piratical nation heavily reliant on naval power, and particularly privateers, which they referred to as Perfidious Albion.

However, in 1672, the English again formed an alliance with the French (in accordance with the Secret Treaty of Dover of 1670) against their common commercial rival, the rich Dutch Republic – the two nations fighting side by side during the Franco-Dutch War (1672–1678) and Third Anglo-Dutch War (1672–1674). This war was extremely unpopular in England. The English had been soundly beaten at sea by the Dutch and were in a worsening financial situation as their vulnerable global trade was under increasing threat. The English pulled out of the alliance in 1674, ending their war with the Netherlands and actually joining them against the French in the final year of the Franco-Dutch War in 1678.

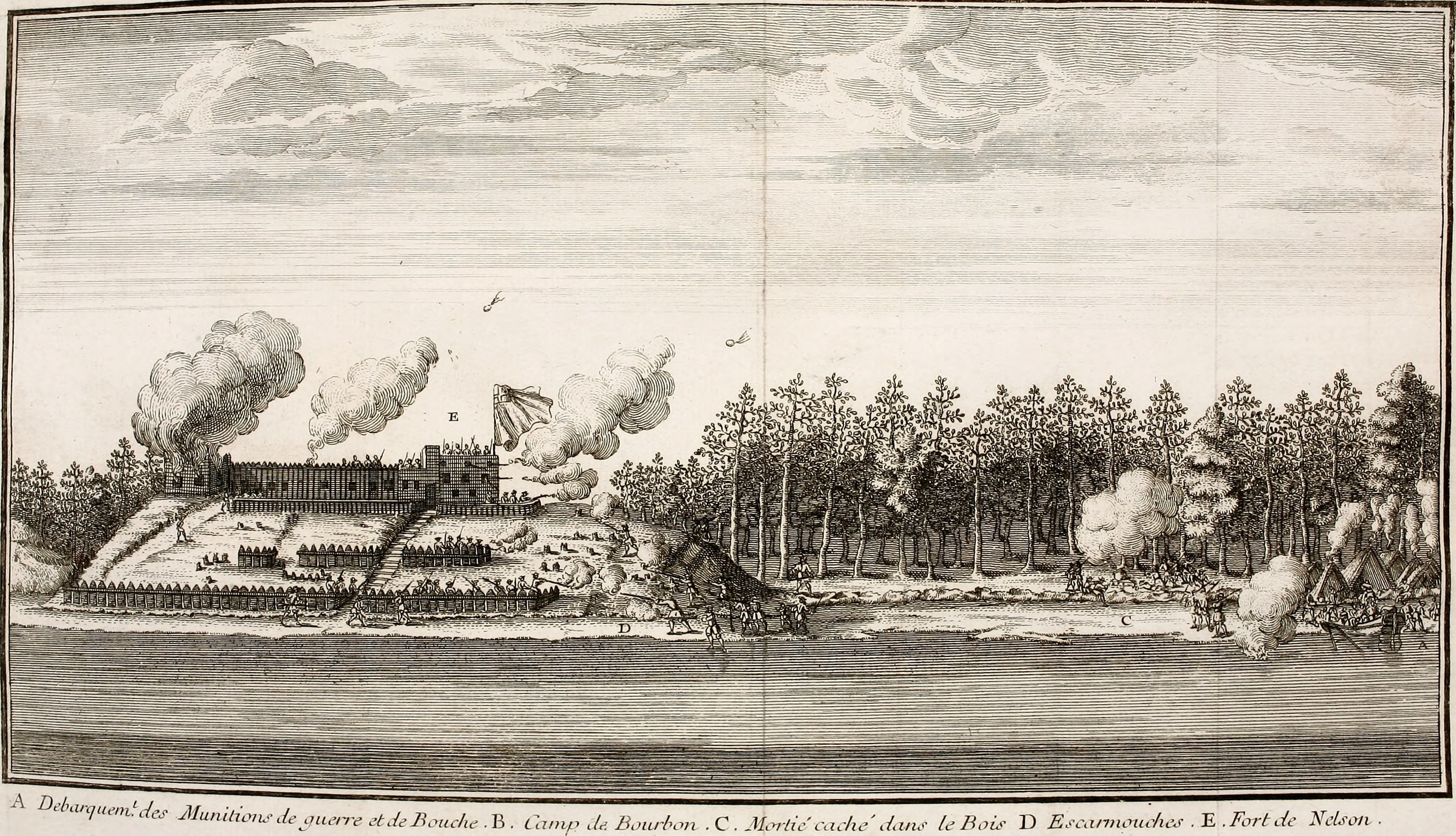
French forces led by d'Iberville, managed to defeat an English squadron, and capture York Factory during the Battle of Hudson's Bay.

During the course of the century a sharp diversion in political philosophies emerged in the two states. In England King Charles I had been executed during the English Civil War for exceeding his powers, and later King James II had been overthrown in the Glorious Revolution. In France, the decades long Fronde (civil wars), had seen the French Monarchy triumphant and as a result the power of the monarchs and their advisors became almost absolute and went largely unchecked.

England and France fought each other in the War of the League of Augsburg from 1688 to 1697 which set the pattern for relations between France and Great Britain during the eighteenth century. Wars were fought intermittently, with each nation part of a constantly shifting pattern of alliances known as the stately quadrille.

=== Second Hundred Years' War 1689–1815 ===
==== 18th century ====
The Act of Union was passed in 1707 partly to unify Great Britain against the perceived French threat.

Partly out of fear of a continental intervention, an Act of Union was passed in 1707 creating the Kingdom of Great Britain, and formally merging the kingdoms of Scotland and England (the latter kingdom included Wales). While the new Britain grew increasingly parliamentarian, France continued its system of absolute monarchy.

The newly united Britain fought France in the War of the Spanish Succession from 1702 to 1713, and the War of the Austrian Succession from 1740 to 1748, attempting to maintain the balance of power in Europe. The British had a massive navy but maintained a small land army, so Britain always acted on the continent in alliance with other states such as Prussia and Austria as they were unable to fight France alone. Equally France, lacking a superior navy, was unable to launch a successful invasion of Britain.

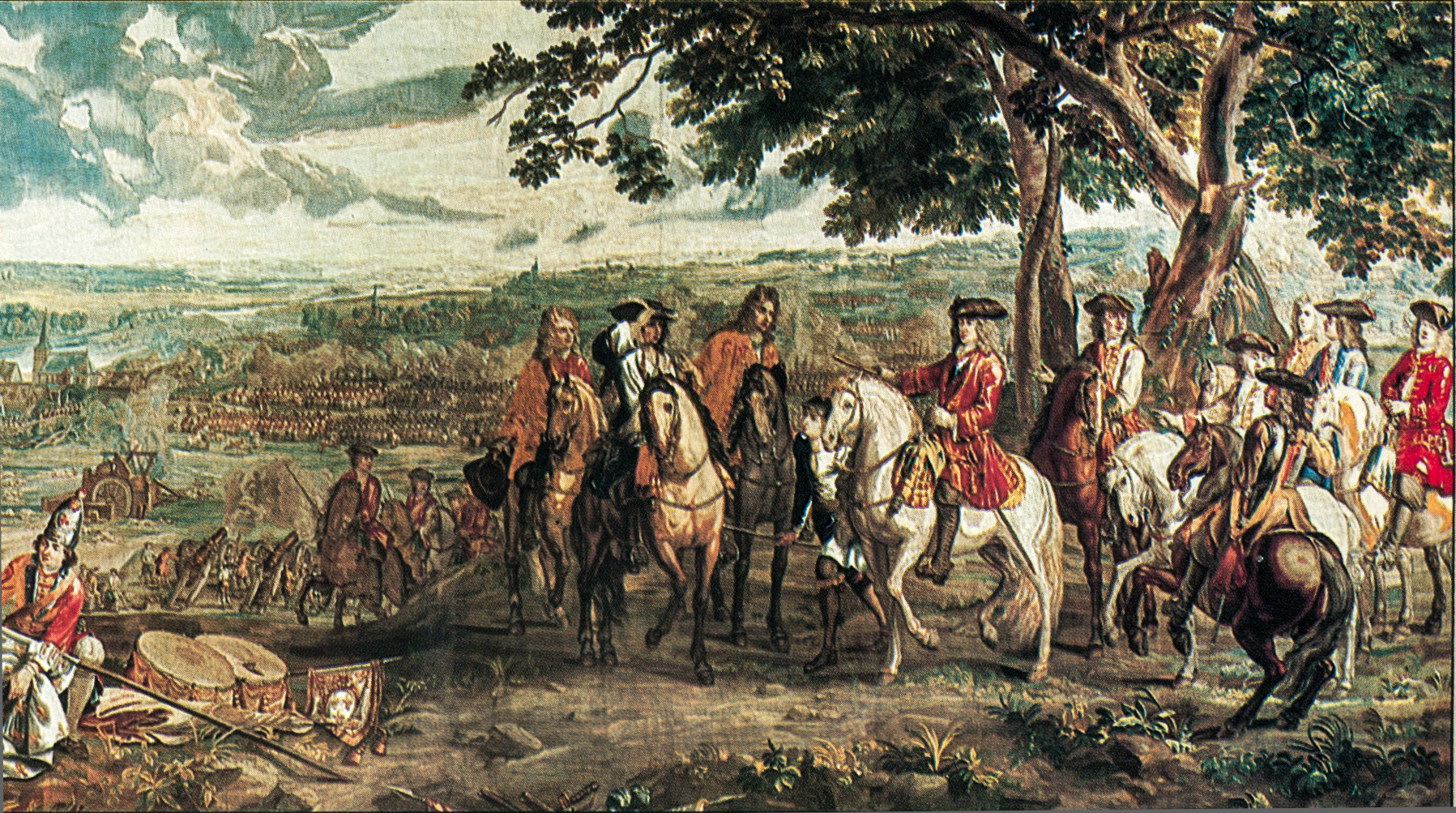
John Churchill, Duke of Marlborough accepts the French surrender at Blenheim, 1704.

France lent support to the Jacobite pretenders who claimed the British throne, hoping that a restored Jacobite monarchy would be inclined to be more pro-French. Despite this support the Jacobites failed to overthrow the Hanoverian monarchs.

The quarter century after the Treaty of Utrecht in 1713 was peaceful, with no major wars, and only a few secondary military episodes of minor importance. The main powers had exhausted themselves in warfare, with many deaths, disabled veterans, ruined navies, high pension costs, heavy loans and high taxes. Utrecht strengthened the sense of useful international law and inaugurated an era of relative stability in the European state system, based on balance-of-power politics that no one country would become dominant. Robert Walpole, the key British policy maker, prioritised peace in Europe because it was good for his trading nation and its growing British Empire. British historian G. M. Trevelyan argues:

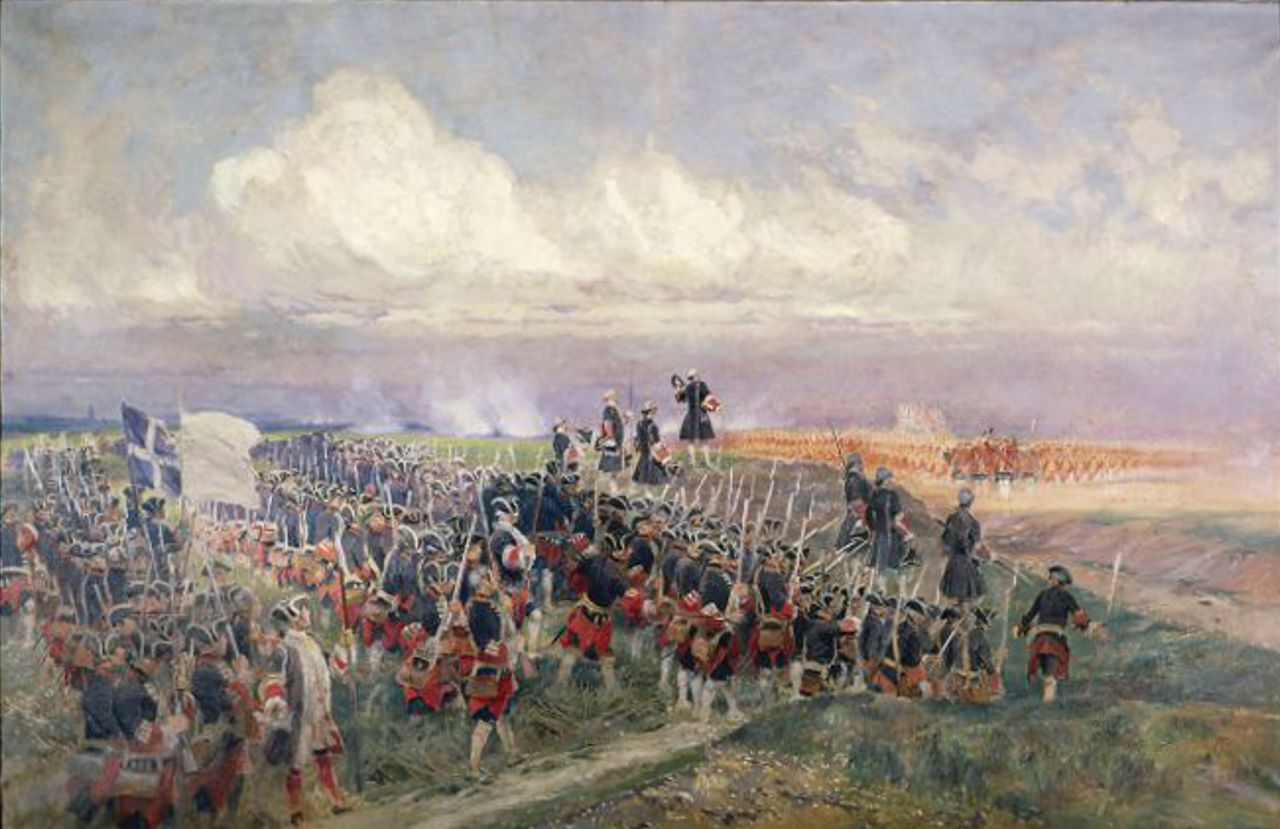
The War of the Austrian Succession was one of several wars in which states tried to maintain the European balance of power.

That Treaty [of Utrecht], which ushered in the stable and characteristic period of Eighteenth-Century civilisation, marked the end of danger to Europe from the old French monarchy, and it marked a change of no less significance to the world at large, — the maritime, commercial and financial supremacy of Great Britain.

But "balance" needed armed enforcement. Britain played a key military role as "balancer." The goals were to bolster Europe's balance of power system to maintain peace that was needed for British trade to flourish and its colonies to grow, and finally to strengthen its own central position in the balance of power system in which no one could dominate the rest. Other nations recognised Britain as the "balancer." Eventually the balancing act required Britain to contain French ambitions. Containment led to a series of increasingly large-scale wars between Britain and France, which ended with mixed results. Britain was usually aligned with the Netherlands and Prussia, and subsidised their armies. These wars enveloped all of Europe and the overseas colonies. These wars took place in every decade starting in the 1740s and climaxed in the defeat of Napoleon's France in 1814.

As the century wore on, there was a distinct passage of power to Britain and France, at the expense of traditional major powers such as Portugal, Spain and the Dutch Republic. Some observers saw the frequent conflicts between the two states during the 18th century as a battle for control of Europe, though most of these wars ended without a conclusive victory for either side. France largely had greater influence on the continent while Britain were dominant at sea and trade, threatening French colonies abroad.

==== Overseas expansion ====
From the 1650s, the New World increasingly became a battleground between the two powers. The Western Design of Oliver Cromwell intended to build up an increasing British presence in North America, beginning with the acquisition of Jamaica from the Spanish Empire in 1652. The first British settlement on continental North America was founded in 1607, and by the 1730s these had grown into thirteen separate colonies.

The French had settled the province of Canada to the North, and controlled Saint-Domingue in the Caribbean, the wealthiest colony in the world. Both countries, recognising the potential of India, established trading posts there. Wars between the two states increasingly included combat in these other continents. Saint Lucia changed masters fourteen times in these disputes, mostly in the late 18th century. France claimed the island of Martinique who was once settled by the French and African slaves which became a prosperous French colony until it was changed six times by the British from 1762 until the Treaty of Paris in 1814 when it was ceded back to the French once more, which led the abolition of slavery on 27 April 1848.

==== Seven Years' War ====
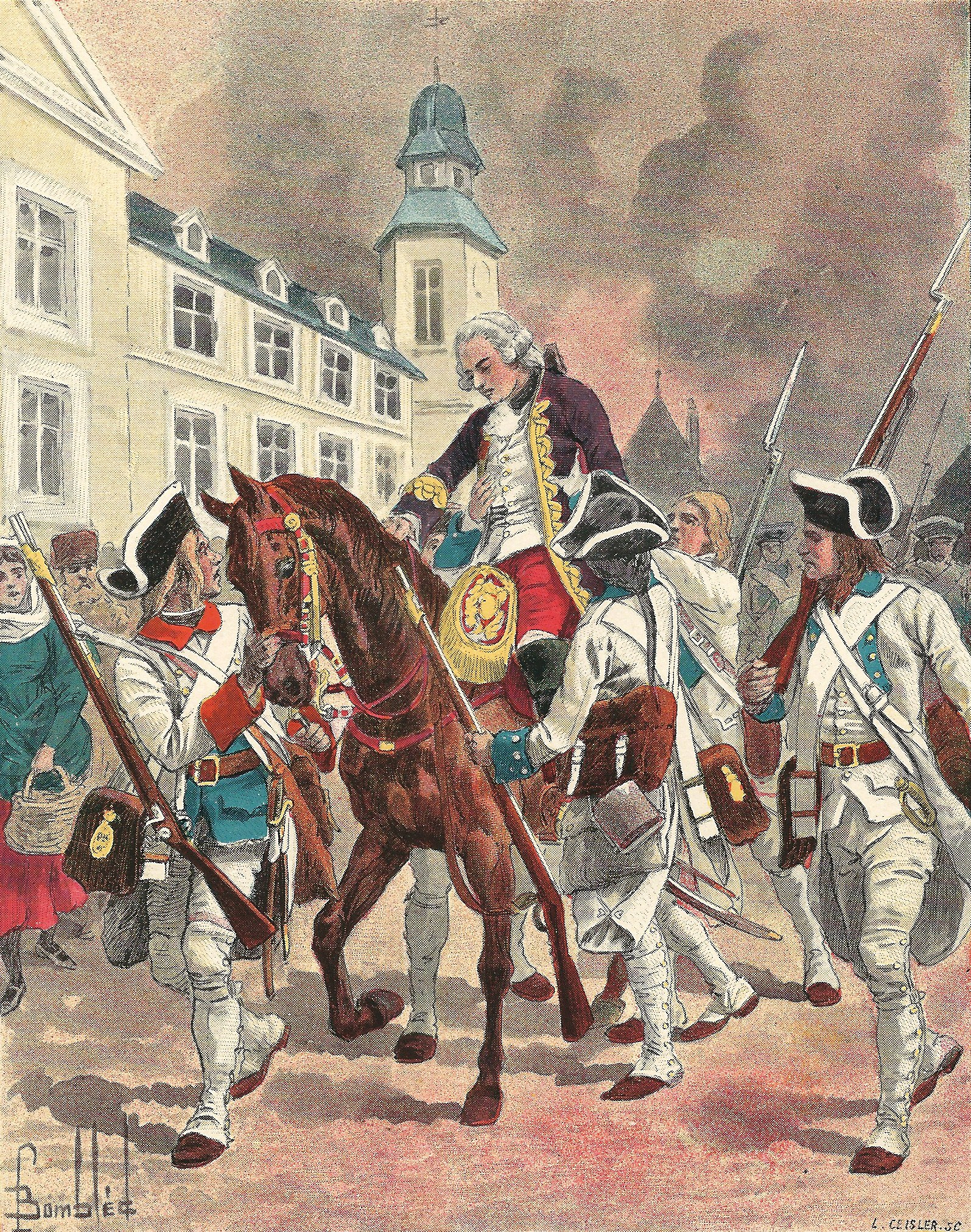
The loss of Quebec to the British in 1759 was a major blow to French colonial ambitions, compounded by defeats in Europe and India.

The French and British fought each other and made treaties with Native American tribes to gain control of North America. Both nations coveted the Ohio Country and in 1753, a British expedition there led by George Washington clashed with a French force. Shortly afterwards the French and Indian War broke out, initially taking place only in North America but in 1756 becoming part of the wider Seven Years' War in which Britain and France were part of opposing coalitions.

The war has been called the first "world war", because fighting took place on several different continents. In 1759, the British enjoyed victories over the French in Europe, Canada and India, severely weakening the French position around the world. In 1762, the British captured the cities of Manila and Havana from Spain, France's strongest ally, which led ultimately to a peace settlement the following year that saw a large number of territories come under British control.

The Seven Years' War is regarded as a critical moment in the history of Anglo-French relations, which laid the foundations for the dominance of the British Empire during the next two and a half centuries.

==== South Seas ====
Having lost New France (Canada) and India in the northern hemisphere, many Frenchmen turned their attention to building a second empire south of the equator, thereby triggering a race for the Pacific Ocean. They were supported by King Louis XV and by the Duc de Choiseul, Minister for War and for the Navy. In 1763, Louis Bougainville sailed from France with two ships, several families, cattle, horses and grain. He established the first colony in the Falkland Islands at Port Saint Louis in February 1764. This done, Bougainville's plan was to use the new settlement as a French base from where he could mount a search for the long-imagined (but still undiscovered) Southern Continent and claim it for France.

Meanwhile, the Secretary of the Admiralty, Philip Stephens, swiftly and secretly dispatched John Byron to the Falklands and round the world. He was followed in 1766 by Samuel Wallis who discovered Tahiti and claimed it for Britain. Bougainville followed and claimed Tahiti for France in 1768, but when he tried to reach the east coast of New Holland (Australia), he was thwarted by the Great Barrier Reef.

The Admiralty sent Captain Cook to the Pacific on three voyages of discovery in 1768, 1772 and 1776. Cook was killed in Hawaii in 1779 and his two ships, Resolution and Discovery, arrived home in October 1780.

At the same time, more Frenchmen were probing the South Seas. In 1769, Jean Surville sailed from India, through the Coral Sea to New Zealand then traversed the Pacific to Peru. In 1771, Marion Dufresne and Julien–Marie Crozet sailed through the Indian and Pacific Oceans. Later in 1771, another French expedition under Yves de Kerguelen and Louis St Aloüarn explored the southern Indian Ocean. St Aloüarn annexed the west coast of New Holland for France in March 1772.

In August 1785, King Louis XVI sent Jean-François Lapérouse to explore the Pacific Ocean. He arrived off Sydney Heads in January 1788, three days after the arrival of Britain's First Fleet commanded by Arthur Phillip. The French expedition departed Australia three months later in March 1788 and, according to the records, was never seen again.

The race for territory in the South Seas continued into the nineteenth century. Although the British had settled the eastern region of New Holland, in 1800 Napoleon dispatched an expedition commanded by Nicolas Baudin to forestall the British on the south and west coasts of the continent.

==== American War of Independence ====
As American Patriot dissatisfaction with British policies grew to rebellion in 1774–75, the French saw an opportunity to undermine British power. When the American War of Independence broke out in 1775, the French began sending covert supplies and intelligence to the American Patriots.

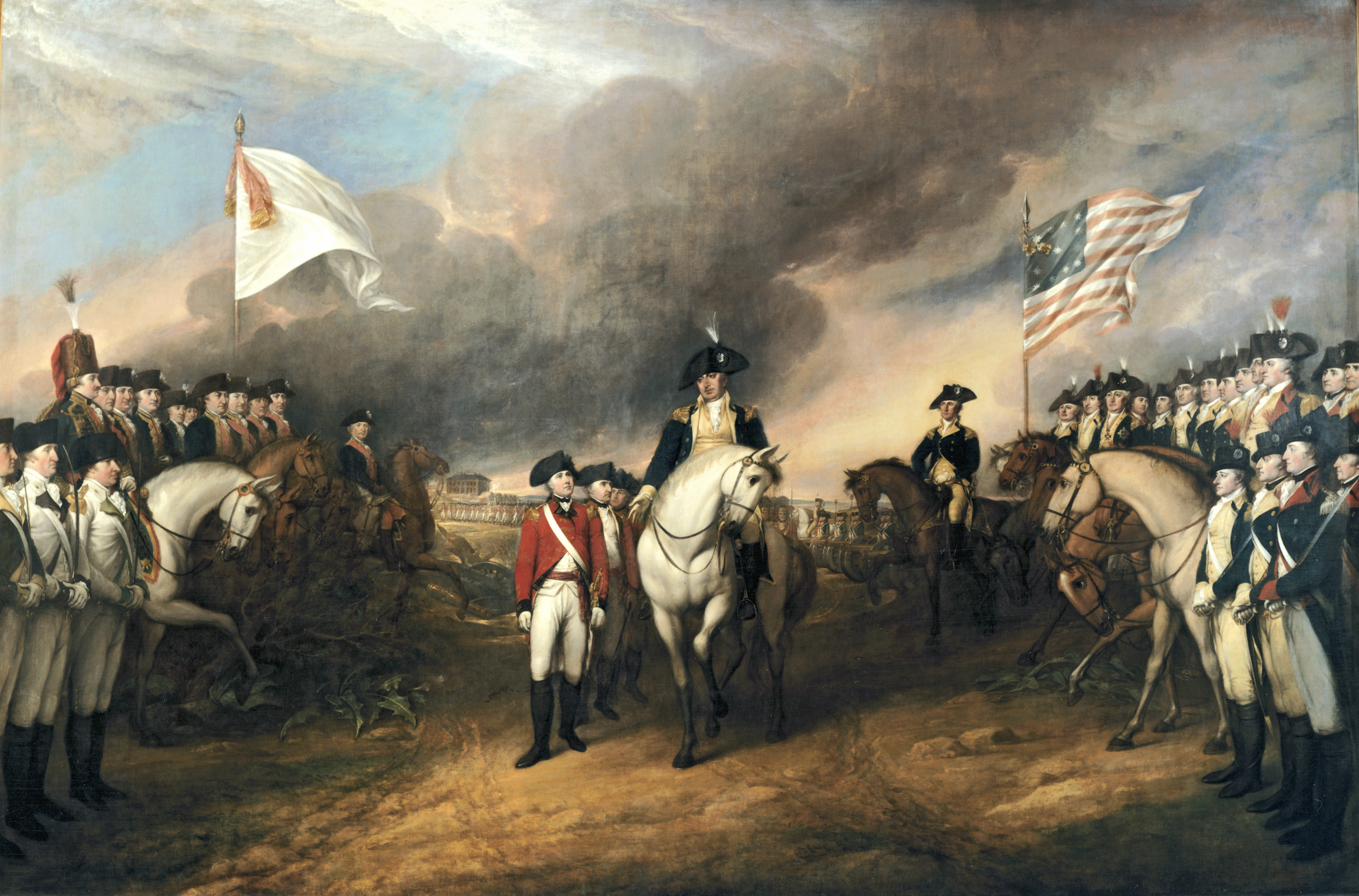
The British defeat at Yorktown was made possible by the actions of a French fleet and a combined French and American army under George Washington. It marked the end of the First British Empire.

In 1778, France, eager to capitalise on the British defeat at Saratoga, recognised the United States of America as an independent nation. Negotiating with Ambassador Benjamin Franklin in Paris, they formed a military alliance. France in 1779 persuaded its ally Spain to declare war on Britain. France despatched troops to fight alongside the Americans, and besieged Gibraltar with Spain. Plans were drawn up, but never put into action, to launch an invasion of England. The threat forced Britain to keep many troops in Britain that were needed in America. The British were further required to withdraw forces from the American mainland to protect their more valuable possessions in the West Indies. While the French were initially unable to break the string of British victories, the combined actions of American and French forces, and a key victory by a French fleet over a British rescue fleet, forced the British into a decisive surrender at Yorktown, Virginia, in 1781. For a brief period after 1781, Britain's naval superiority was weakened by an alliance between France and Spain. However, the British recovered, defeated the main French fleet in April 1782, and kept control of Gibraltar. In 1783 the Treaty of Paris gave the new nation control over most of the region east of the Mississippi River; Spain gained Florida from Britain and retained control of the vast Louisiana Territory; France received little except a huge debt.

The crippling debts incurred by France during the war, and the cost of rebuilding the French navy during the 1780s caused a financial crisis, helping contribute to the French Revolution of 1789.

=== The French Revolution and Napoleon ===
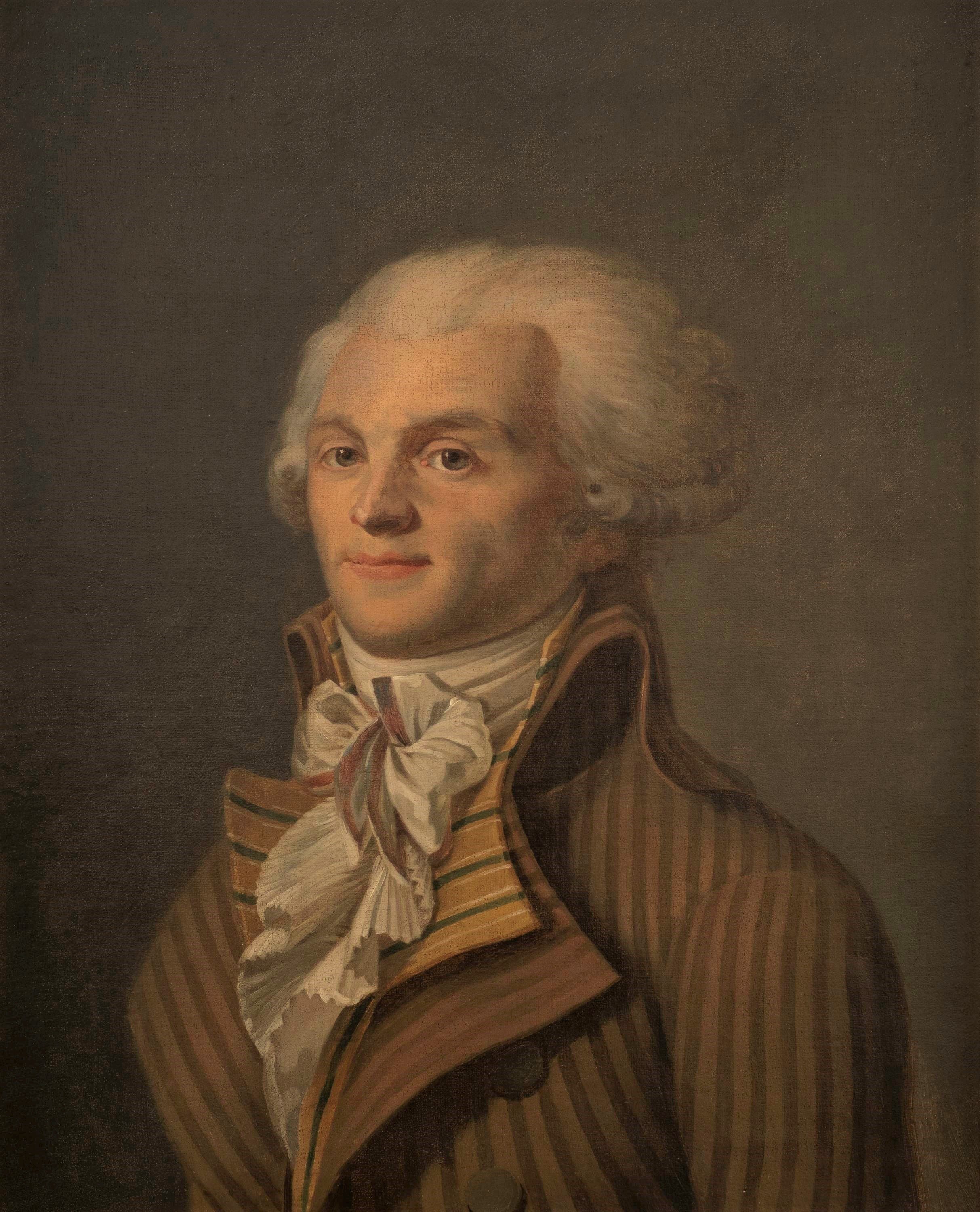
The French Republican leader Maximilien Robespierre became a deeply unpopular figure in Britain because of his role in the Terror. Despite this, Britain initially had no desire to go to war with the new French Republic.

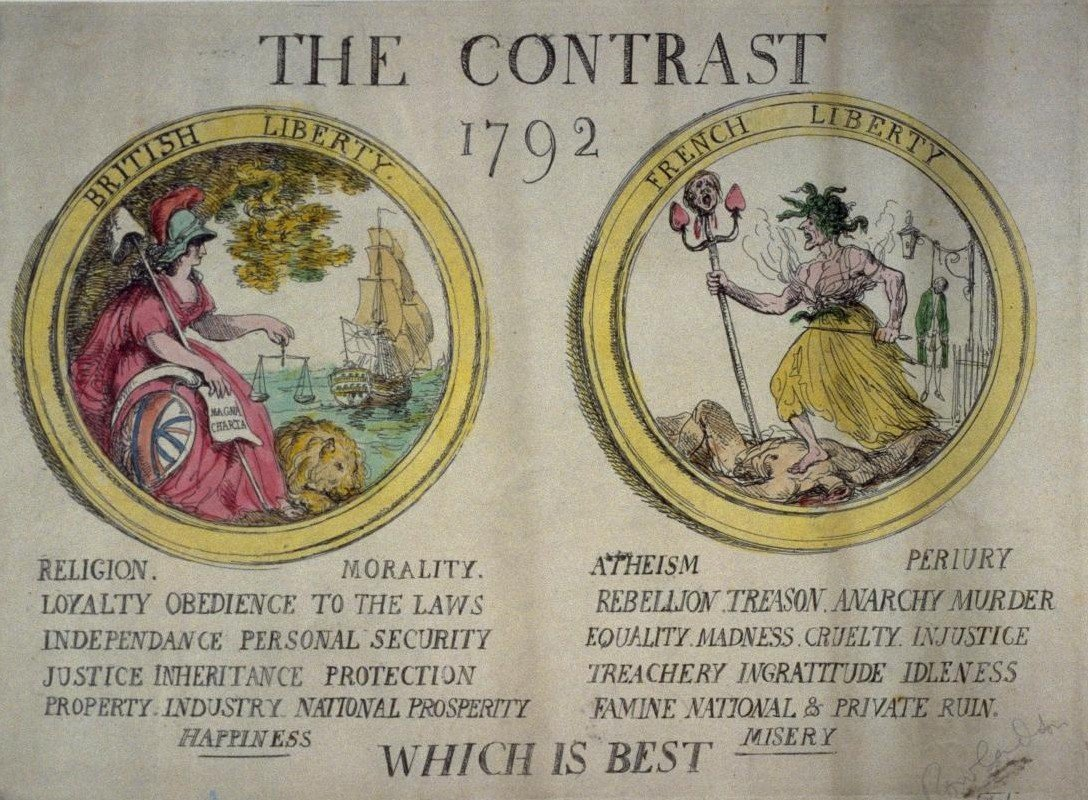
The revolution was initially popular in Britain, but later its turmoils turned into a cause of alarm, as this 1792 caricature contrasting "British Liberty" with "French Liberty" demonstrates.

The continental European monarchies went to war against France to protect their monarchies against the Revolutionary threat of republics. The British goals were more complex: not just to defend its national security but even more to uphold the European balance of power so that France would not dominate the continent. British decision-making was in the hands of Prime Minister William Pitt and lords Grenville and Lord Melville. They devised strategies to use the superior Royal Navy and superior financial resources. Both sides demonised each other, thereby broadening the base of warfare to include the total population. London tried to foment rebellions inside France while Paris sent an invasion force to Ireland to stir up a revolt there. French leaders emphasised their nation's much larger population, the excitement of its revolutionary ideology, and popular hatred of the exiled aristocrats.

While France was plunged into chaos, Britain took advantage of its temporary weakness to stir up the civil war occurring in France and build up its naval forces. The Revolution was initially popular with many Britons, both because it appeared to weaken France and was perceived to be based on British liberal ideals. This began to change as the Jacobin faction took over, and began the Reign of Terror in 1793–1794.

The French were intent on spreading their revolutionary republicanism to other European states, including Britain. The British initially stayed out of the alliances of European states which unsuccessfully attacked France trying to restore the monarchy. In France a new, strong nationalism took hold enabling them to mobilise large and motivated forces. Following the execution of Louis XVI in 1793, France declared war on Britain. This period of the French Revolutionary Wars was known as the War of the First Coalition. Except for a brief pause in 1802–03, the wars lasted continuously for 21 years. During this time Britain raised several coalitions against the French, continually subsidising other European states with gold (called the "Golden Cavalry of St George"), enabling them to put large armies in the field. In spite of this, the French armies were very successful on land, creating several client states such as the Batavian Republic, and the British devoted much of their own forces to campaigns against the French in the Caribbean, with mixed results. The British and their allies got off to a poor start in 1793–94. The main problem was poor coordination between London and Vienna, including delays in planning, poor preparations, and diversion of forces. The result was diplomatic and military reversals in Flanders in the summer of 1794.

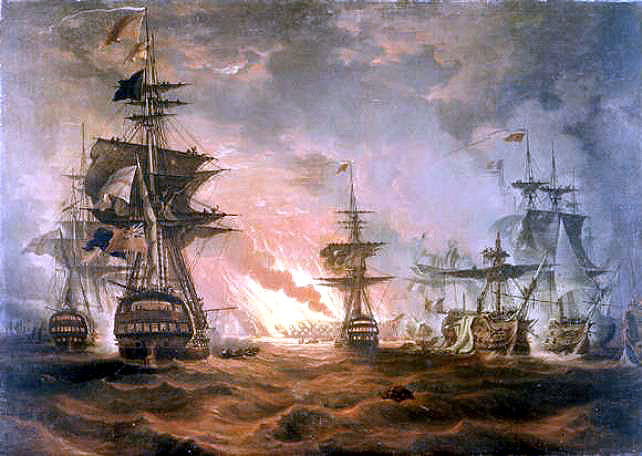
British dominance of the seas prevented France from gaining the upper-hand outside Continental Europe

==== First phase, 1792 to 1802 ====
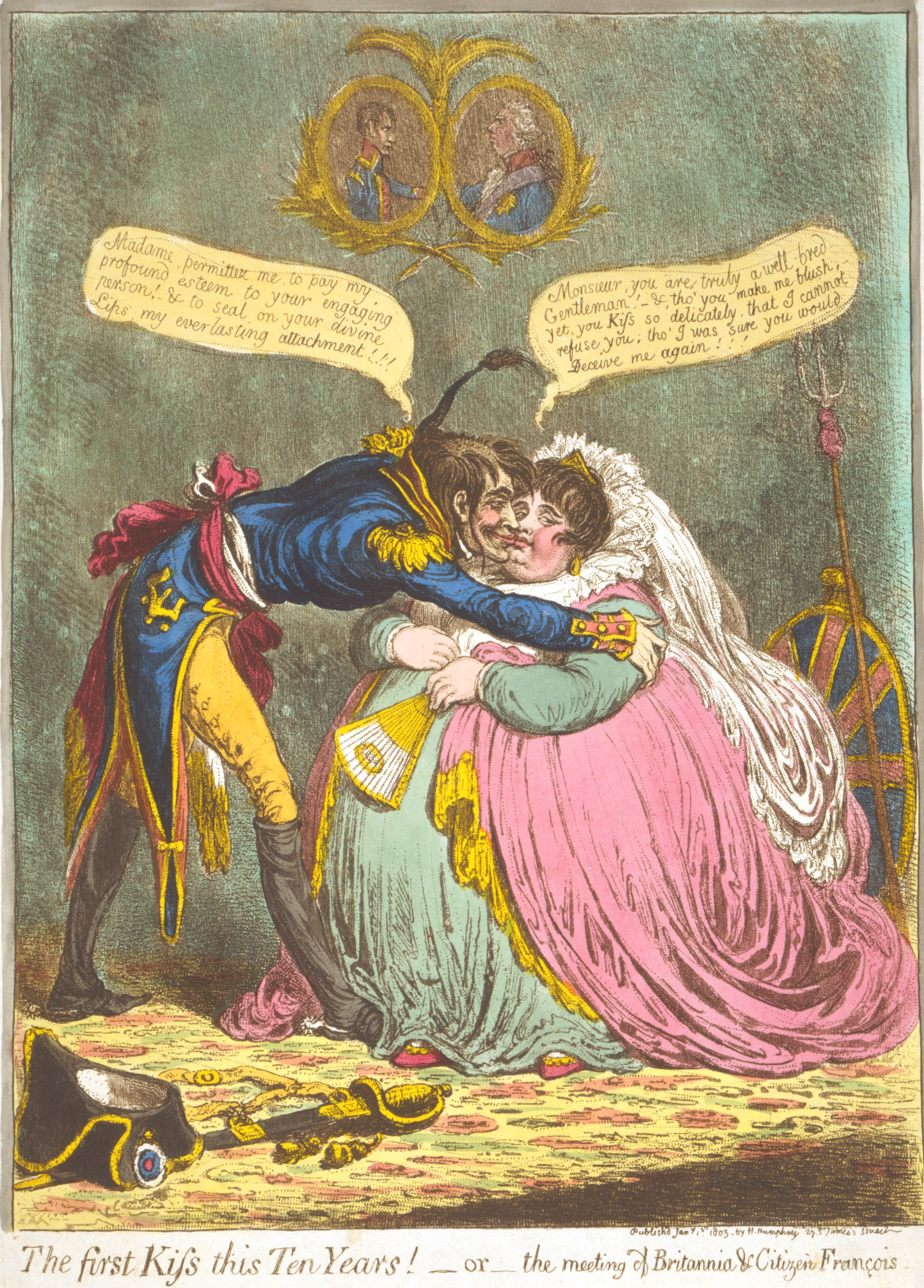
"The first Kiss this Ten Years!" by James Gillray ridicules the short peace that followed the Treaty of Amiens in 1802

Following the execution of Louis XVI in 1793, France declared war on Britain. This period of the French Revolutionary Wars was known as the War of the First Coalition. It lasted from 1792 to 1797. Relying on its large Royal Navy rather than its small army, British strategy was to support smaller allies against France, and try to cut off food shipments. That was an innovative strategy in modern warfare, but the French prioritised feeding their army over the populace, and carried on. Britain's continental allies did nearly all of the actual fighting on land. France meanwhile set up the conscription system that built up a much larger army than anyone else. After the king was executed, nearly all the senior officers went into exile, and a very young new generation of officers, typified by Napoleon, took over the French military. Britain relied heavily on the Royal Navy, which sank the French fleet at the Battle of the Nile in 1798, trapping the French army in Egypt. In 1799, Napoleon came to power in France, and created a dictatorship. Britain led the Second Coalition from 1798 to 1802 against Napoleon, but he generally prevailed. The Treaty of Amiens of 1802 was favourable to France. That treaty amounted to a year-long truce in the war, which was reopened by Britain in May 1803.

Britain ended the uneasy truce created by the Treaty of Amiens when it declared war on France in May 1803, thus starting the War of the Third Coalition, lasting from 1803 to 1805. The British were increasingly angered by Napoleon's reordering of the international system in Western Europe, especially in Switzerland, Germany, Italy and the Netherlands. Kagan argues that Britain was insulted and alarmed especially by Napoleon's assertion of control over Switzerland. Britons felt insulted when Napoleon said it deserved no voice in European affairs (even though King George was an elector of the Holy Roman Empire), and ought to shut down the London newspapers that were vilifying Napoleon. Russia, furthermore, decided that the Switzerland intervention indicated that Napoleon was not looking toward a peaceful resolution. Britain had a sense of loss of control, as well as loss of markets, and was worried by Napoleon's possible threat to its overseas colonies. McLynn argues that Britain went to war in 1803 out of a "mixture of economic motives and national neuroses – an irrational anxiety about Napoleon's motives and intentions." However, in the end it proved to be the right choice for Britain, because in the long run Napoleon's intentions were hostile to British national interest. Furthermore, Napoleon was not ready for war and this was the best time for Britain to stop them. Britain therefore seized upon the Malta issue (by refusing to follow the terms of the Treaty of Amiens and evacuate the island).

The deeper British grievances were that Napoleon was taking personal control of Europe, making the international system unstable, and forcing Britain to the sidelines.

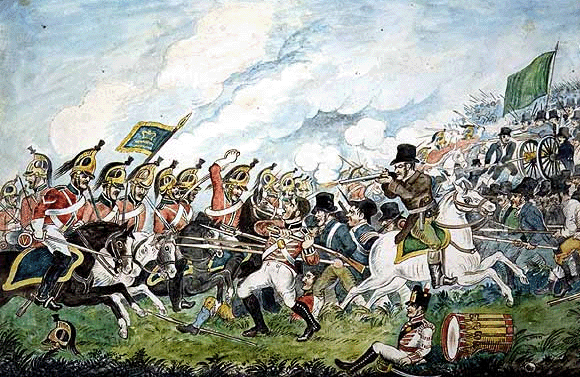
French forces landed in Ireland to support Irish rebels during the failed Irish rebellion of 1798

===== Ireland 1798 =====
In 1798, French forces invaded Ireland to assist the United Irishmen who had launched a rebellion. Although the French joined by thousands of rebels, they were defeated by British and Irish loyalist forces. The fear of further attempts to create a French satellite in Ireland led to the Act of Union, merging the Kingdom of Great Britain and Kingdom of Ireland to create the United Kingdom in 1801. Ireland now lost its last vestiges of independence.

==== Louisiana Purchase and the Haitian Revolution ====
Napoleon sold the vast Louisiana Territory from France to the United States in April 1803 after failing to crush the slave rebellion in Saint-Domingue, he abandoned his dreams of a North American empire and sought funds to fight Great Britain, following the capture of Toussaint Louverture by French forces in 1802 and died in a cold French prison in April 1803. Recognizing Britain's naval blockade against France, Haitian leaders strategically negotiated for British arms, supplies, and naval support to isolate the French forces. Jean-Jacques Dessalines and Henri Christophe had successfully negotiated a strategic alliance with the British Empire to decisively defeat Napoleon’s forces during the final stages of the Haitian Revolution. On 18 November 1803, Dessalines led the revolutionary army to a decisive, final victory at the Battle of Vertières over the French, forcing Rochambeau to surrender. On New Year's Day 1804, Saint-Domingue declared its independence from France and renamed Haiti, the world's very first independent black nation in the Caribbean and Latin America as well as the second oldest independent country in the Americas after the United States.

==== War resumes, 1803–1815 ====
After he had triumphed on the European continent against the other major European powers, Napoleon contemplated an invasion of the British mainland. That plan collapsed after the annihilation of the Franco-Spanish fleet at Trafalgar, coinciding with an Austrian attack over its Bavarian allies.

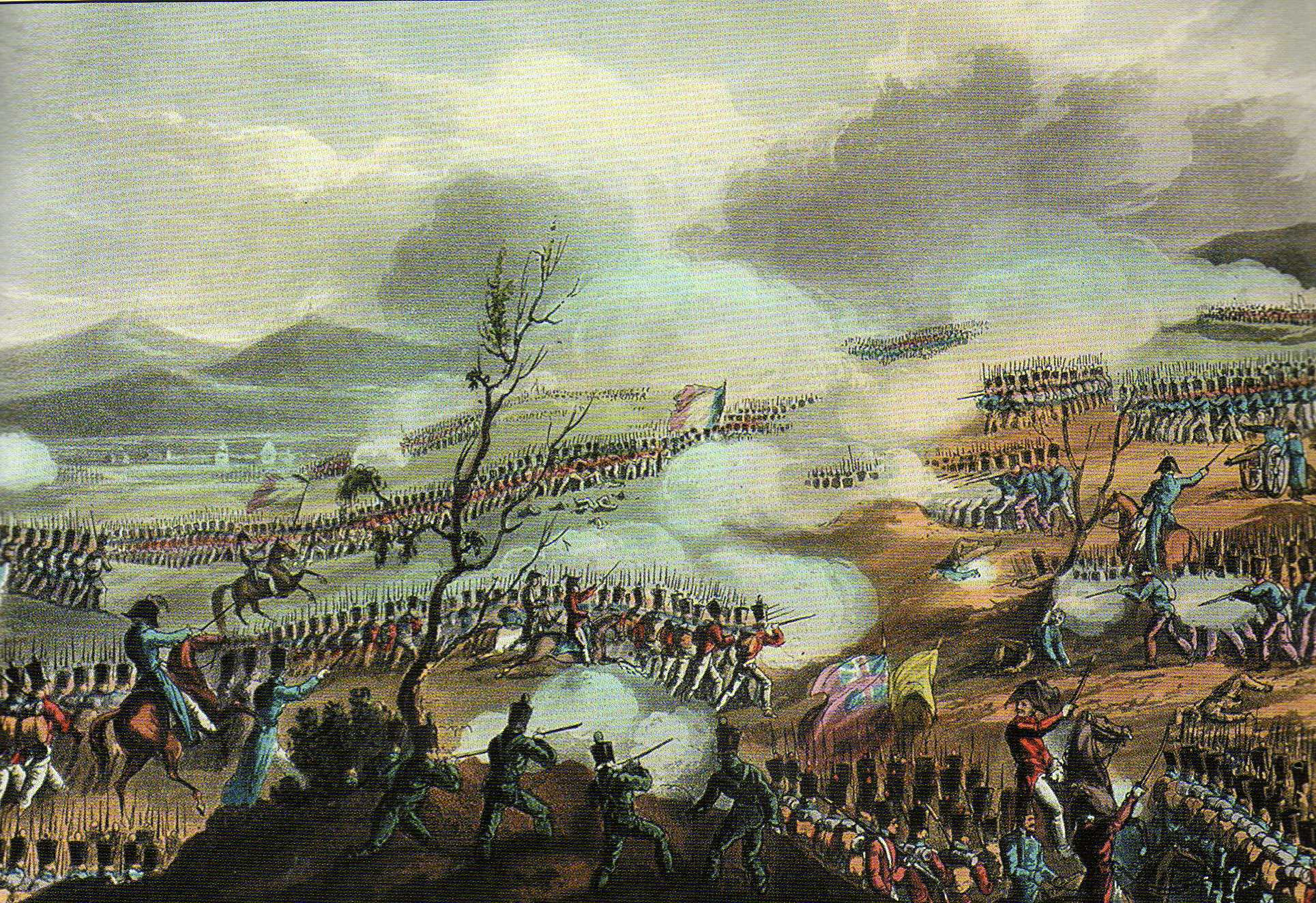
The Battle of Nivelle during the campaign in south-west France, 1814

In response Napoleon established a Continental System by which no nation was permitted to trade with the British. Napoleon hoped the embargo would isolate the British Isles severely weakening them, but a number of countries continued to trade with them in defiance of the policy. In spite of this, the Napoleonic influence stretched across much of Europe.

In 1808, French forces invaded Portugal trying to attempt to halt trade with Britain, turning Spain into a satellite state in the process. The British responded by dispatching a force under Sir Arthur Wellesley which captured Lisbon. Napoleon dispatched increasing forces into the Iberian Peninsula, which became the key battleground between the two nations. Allied with Spanish and Portuguese forces, the British inflicted a number of defeats on the French, confronted with a new kind of warfare called "guerrilla" which led Napoleon to brand it the "Spanish Ulcer".

In 1812, Napoleon's invasion of Russia caused a new coalition to form against him, in what became the War of the Sixth Coalition. In 1813, British forces defeated French forces in Spain and caused them to retreat into France. Allied to an increasingly resurgent European coalition, the British invaded southern France in October 1813, forcing Napoleon to abdicate and go into exile on Elba in 1814.

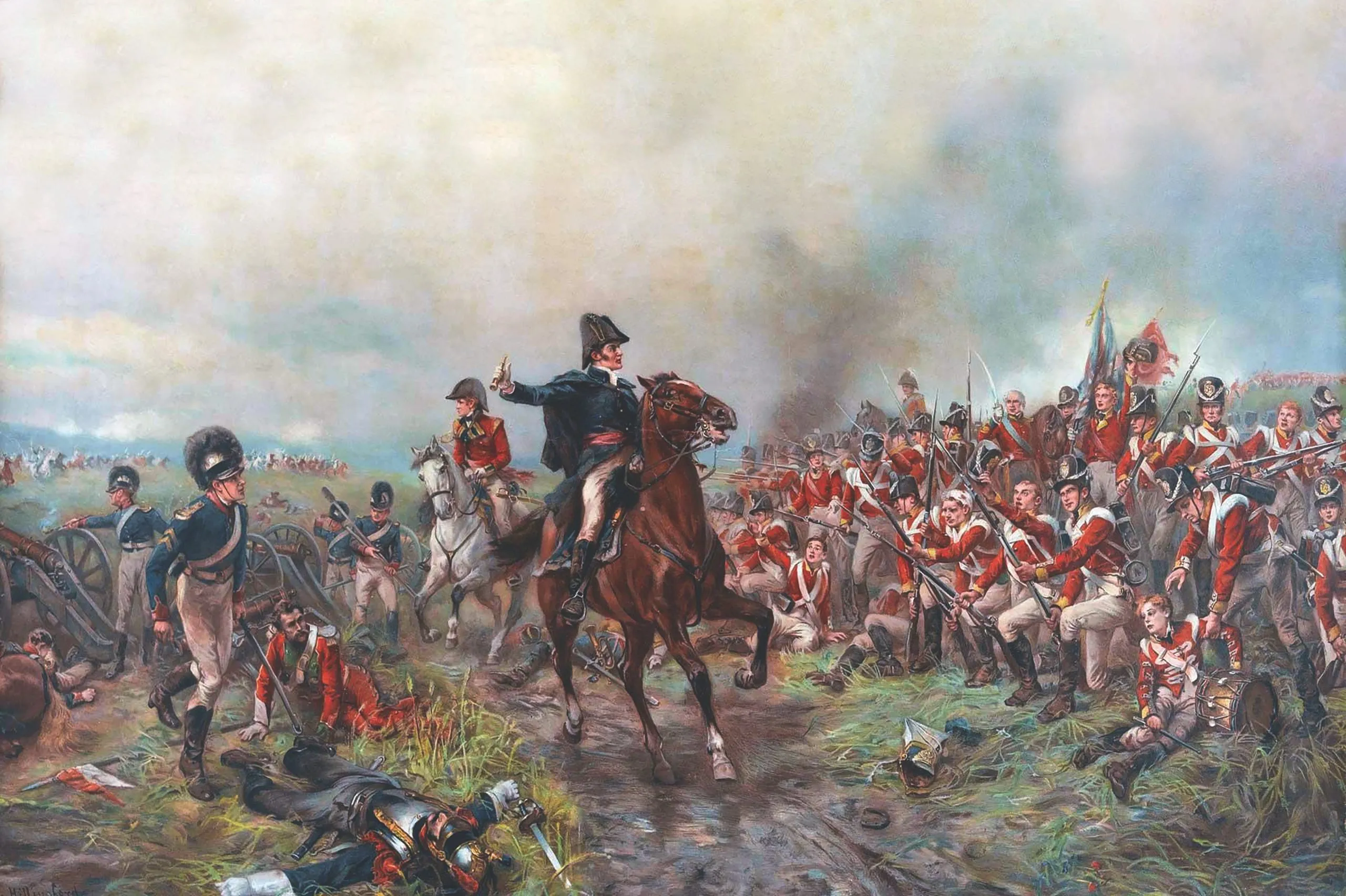
The Allied victory at Waterloo in 1815 marked the end of the Napoleonic era. Though it was the last war between Britain and France, there were later threats of war.

Napoleon was defeated by combined British, Prussian and Dutch forces at Battle of Waterloo in June 1815. With strong British support, the Bourbon monarchy was restored and Louis XVIII was crowned King of France. The Napoleonic era was the last occasion on which Britain and France went to war with each other, but by no means marked the end of the rivalry between the two nations. Viscount Castlereagh shaped British foreign policy as foreign minister 1812–1822; he led the moves against Napoleon 1812 and 1815. Once the Bourbon allies were back in power he established a partnership with France during the Congress of Vienna.

=== Long 19th century: 1789–1914 ===
Britain and France never went to war after 1815, although there were a few "war scares". They were allied together against Russia in the Crimean War of the 1850s.

==== 1815–1830 ====
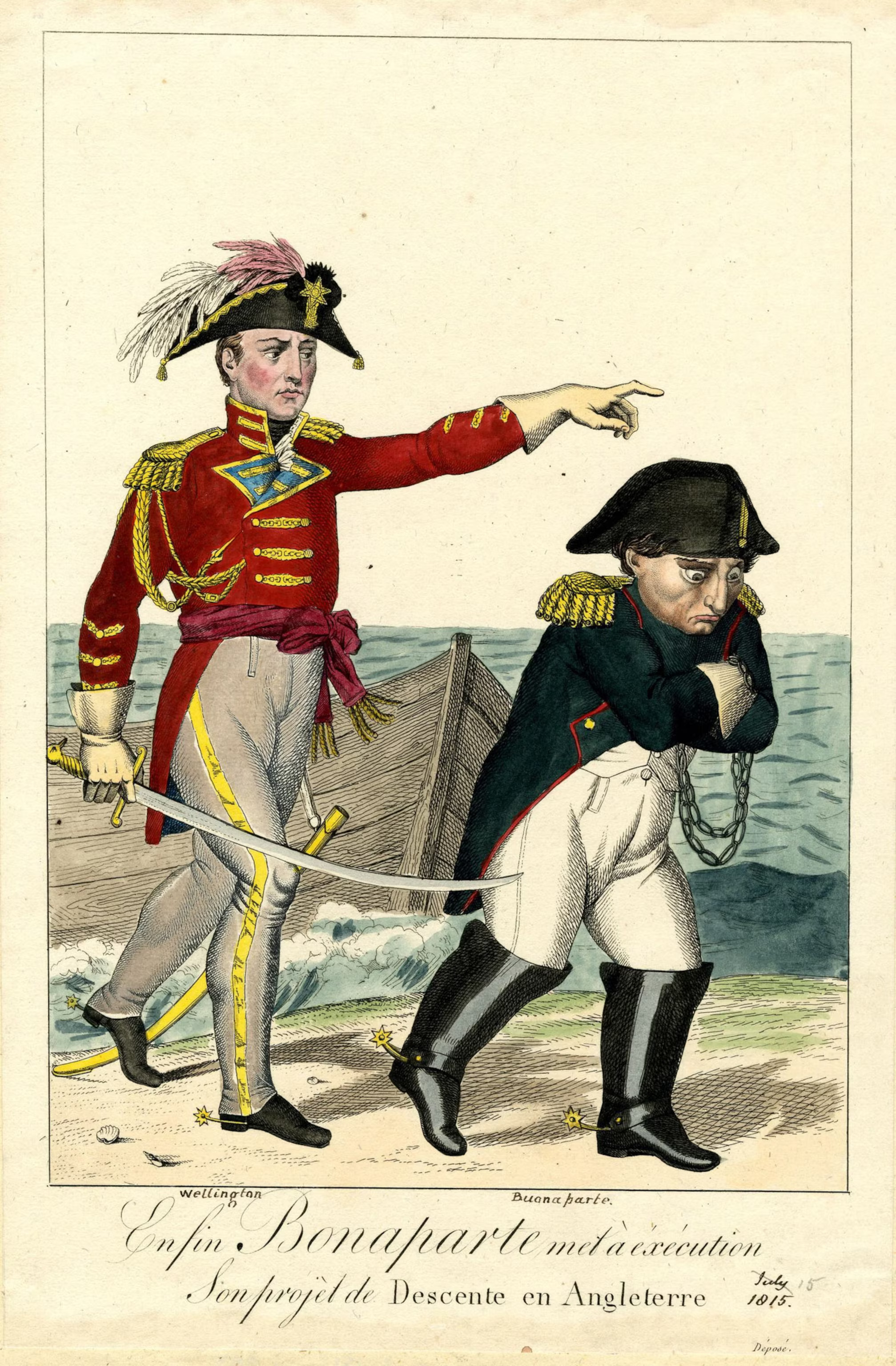
1815 French cartoon depicting the Duke of Wellington ordering Napoleon into exile

Britain emerged from the 1815 Congress of Vienna as the ultimate leading financial, military and colonial power of the world, going on to enjoy a century of global dominance in the Pax Britannica. France recovered from its defeat to rebuild its position on the world stage. Talleyrand's friendly approaches were a precursor to the Entente Cordiale in the next century, but they lacked consistent direction and substance. Overcoming their historic enmity, the British and French eventually became political allies, as both began to turn their attentions to acquiring new territories beyond Europe. The British developed India and Canada and colonised Australia, spreading their powers to several different continents as the Second British Empire. Likewise the French were quite active in Southeast Asia and Africa. Eventually, relations settled down as the two empires tried to consolidate themselves rather than extend themselves.

=== July Monarchy and the beginning of the Victorian age ===
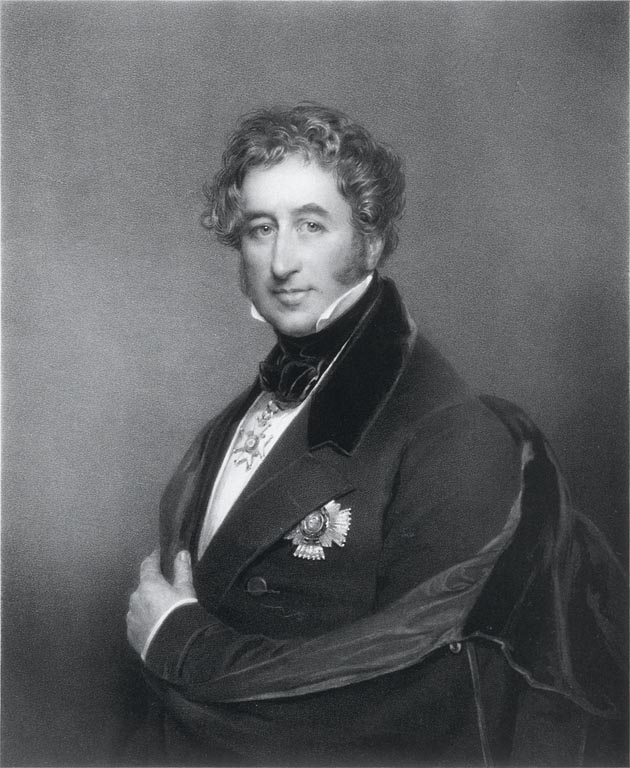
British Foreign Secretary Viscount Palmerston allied himself with French monarch Louis-Philippe.

In 1830, France underwent the July Revolution to expel the reactionary Bourbon kings, and install the Orléanist Louis-Philippe as king. By contrast, the reign of Queen Victoria began in 1837 in a peaceful fashion. The major European powers—Russia, Austria, Britain, and to a lesser extent Prussia—were determined to keep France in check, and so France generally pursued a cautious foreign policy. Louis-Phillipe allied with Britain, the country with which France shared the most similar form of government, and its combative Foreign Secretary Lord Palmerston. In Louis-Philippe's first year in power, he refused to annex Belgium during its revolution, instead following the British line of supporting independence. Despite posturings from leading French minister Adolphe Thiers in 1839–1840 that France would protect the increasingly powerful Muhammad Ali of Egypt (a viceroy of the Ottoman Empire), any reinforcements were not forthcoming, and in 1840, much to France's embarrassment, Ali was forced to sign the Convention of London by the powers. Relations cooled again under the governments of François Guizot and Robert Peel. They soured once more in 1846 though when, with Palmerston back as Foreign Secretary, the French government hastily agreed to have Isabella II of Spain and her sister marry members of the Bourbon and Orléanist dynasties, respectively. Palmerston had hoped to arrange a marriage, and "The Affair of the Spanish Marriages" has generally been viewed unfavourably by British historians ("By the dispassionate judgment of history it has been universally condemned"), although a more sympathetic view has been taken in recent years.

==== Second French Empire ====
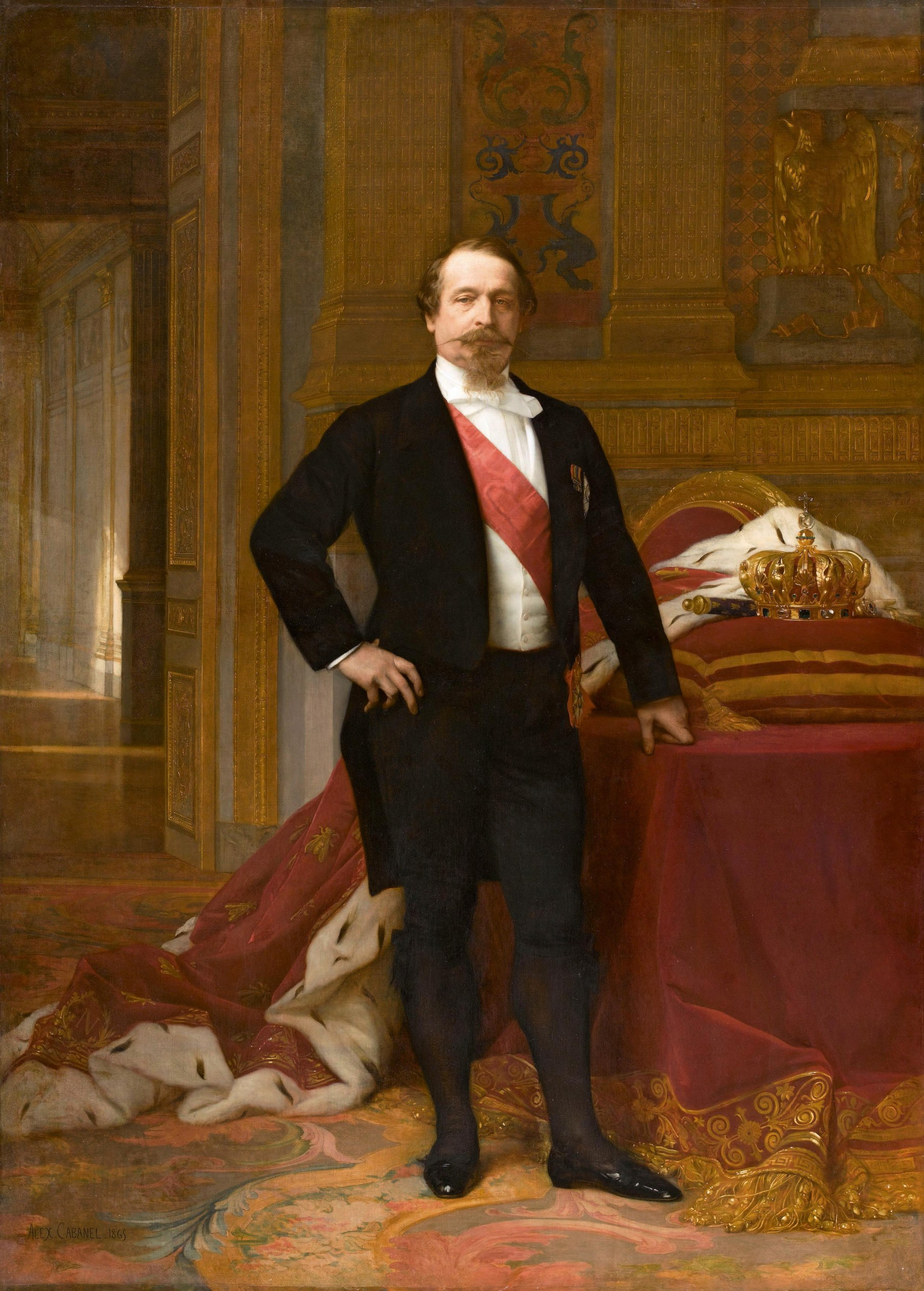
French Emperor Napoleon III

Lord Aberdeen (foreign secretary 1841–46) brokered an Entente Cordiale with François Guizot and France in the early 1840s. However Louis-Napoléon Bonaparte was elected president of France in 1848 and made himself Emperor Napoleon III in 1851. Napoleon III had an expansionist foreign policy, which saw the French deepen the colonisation of Africa and establish new colonies, in particular Indochina. The British were initially alarmed, and commissioned a series of forts in southern England designed to resist a French invasion. Lord Palmerston as foreign minister and prime minister had close personal ties with leading French statesmen, notably Napoleon III himself. Palmerston's goal was to arrange peaceful relations with France in order to free Britain's diplomatic hand elsewhere in the world.

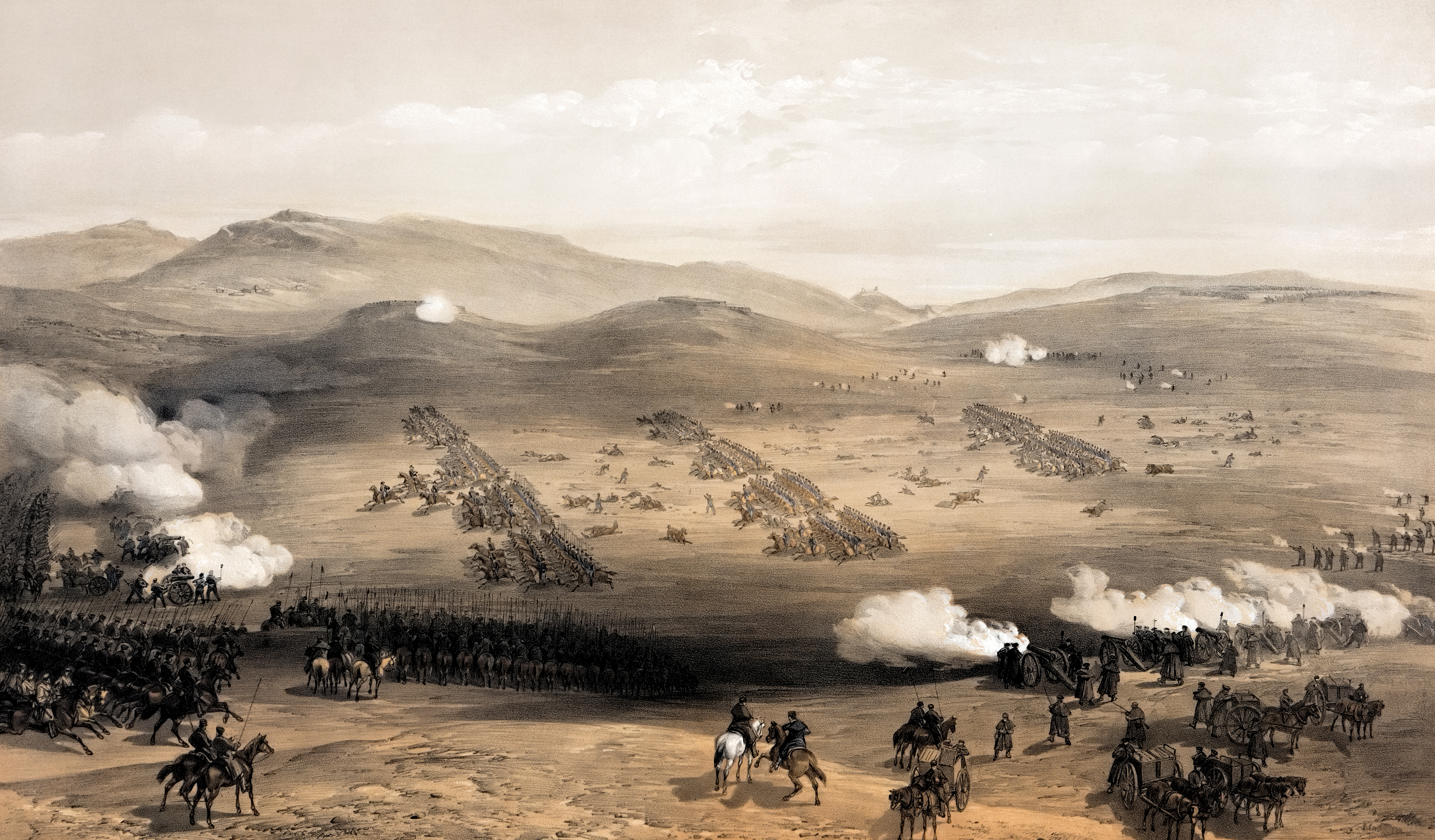
France and Britain were allies during the Crimean War, both aiming to check on the power of an expanding Russia. During the iconic Charge of the Light Brigade it was cover from French cavalry which allowed the British survivors to escape.

Napoleon at first had a pro-British foreign policy, and was eager not to displease the British government whose friendship he saw as important to France. After a brief threat of an invasion of Britain in 1851, France and Britain cooperated in the 1850s, with an alliance in the Crimean War, and a major trade treaty in 1860. However, Britain viewed the Second Empire with increasing distrust, especially as the emperor built up his navy, expanded his empire and took up a more active foreign policy.

The two nations were military allies during the Crimean War (1853–56) to curb Russia's expansion westwards and its threats to the Ottoman Empire. However, when London discovered that Napoleon III was secretly negotiating with Russia to form a postwar alliance to dominate Europe, it hastily abandoned its plan to end the war by attacking St. Petersburg. Instead Britain concluded an armistice with Russia that achieved none of its war aims.

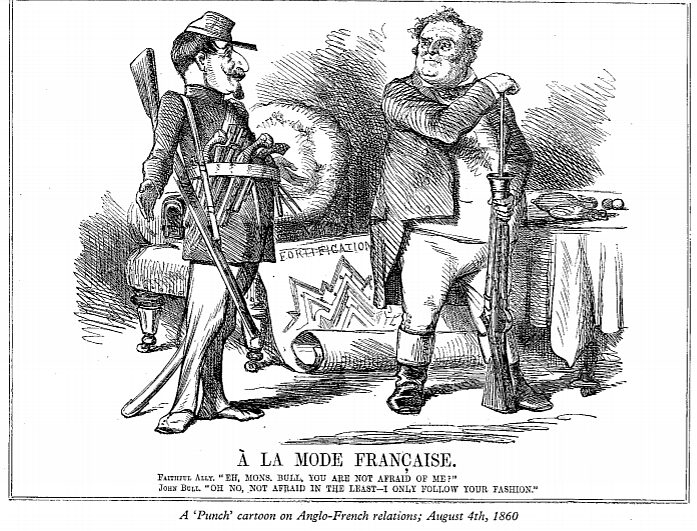
PUNCH warns of danger of French invasion, 4 August 1860

There was a brief war scare in 1858-1860 as alarmists in England misinterpreted scattered hints as signs of an invasion, but Napoleon III never planned any such hostility. The two nations co-operated during the Second Opium War with China, dispatching a joint force to the Chinese capital Peking to force a treaty on the Chinese Qing Dynasty.

In 1859 Napoleon, bypassing the Corps législatif which he feared would not approve of free trade, met with influential reformer Richard Cobden, and in 1860 the Cobden-Chevalier Treaty was signed between the two countries, reducing tariffs on goods sold between Britain and France. The Cobden–Chevalier Treaty of 1860 lowered tariffs in each direction, and began the British practice of encouraging lower tariffs across Europe, and using most favoured nation treaties.

During the American Civil War (1861-1865) both nations considered intervention to help the Confederacy and thereby regain cotton supplies, but remained neutral. The cutoff of cotton shipments caused economic depression in the textile industries of both Britain and France, resulting in widespread unemployment and suffering among workers. In the end France dared not enter alone and Britain refused to go to war because it depended on food shipments from New York. Although US Secretary William H. Seward was at times impetuous, shortly after taking office in 1861 he proposed to Lincoln that the Union be preserved by starting a war with Britain, France and possibly Spain but Lincoln blocked his imprudent projects and channeled his brilliance and effervescence into more useful activities.

Napoleon III attempted to gain British support when he invaded Mexico and forcibly put his pawn Maximilian I on the throne. London was unwilling to support any action other than the collection of debts owed by the Mexicans. This forced the French to act alone in the French Intervention in Mexico. Washington, after winning the civil war, threatened an invasion to expel the French and Napoleon pulled out its troops. Emperor Maximilian remained behind and was executed. When Napoleon III was overthrown in 1870, he fled to exile in England.

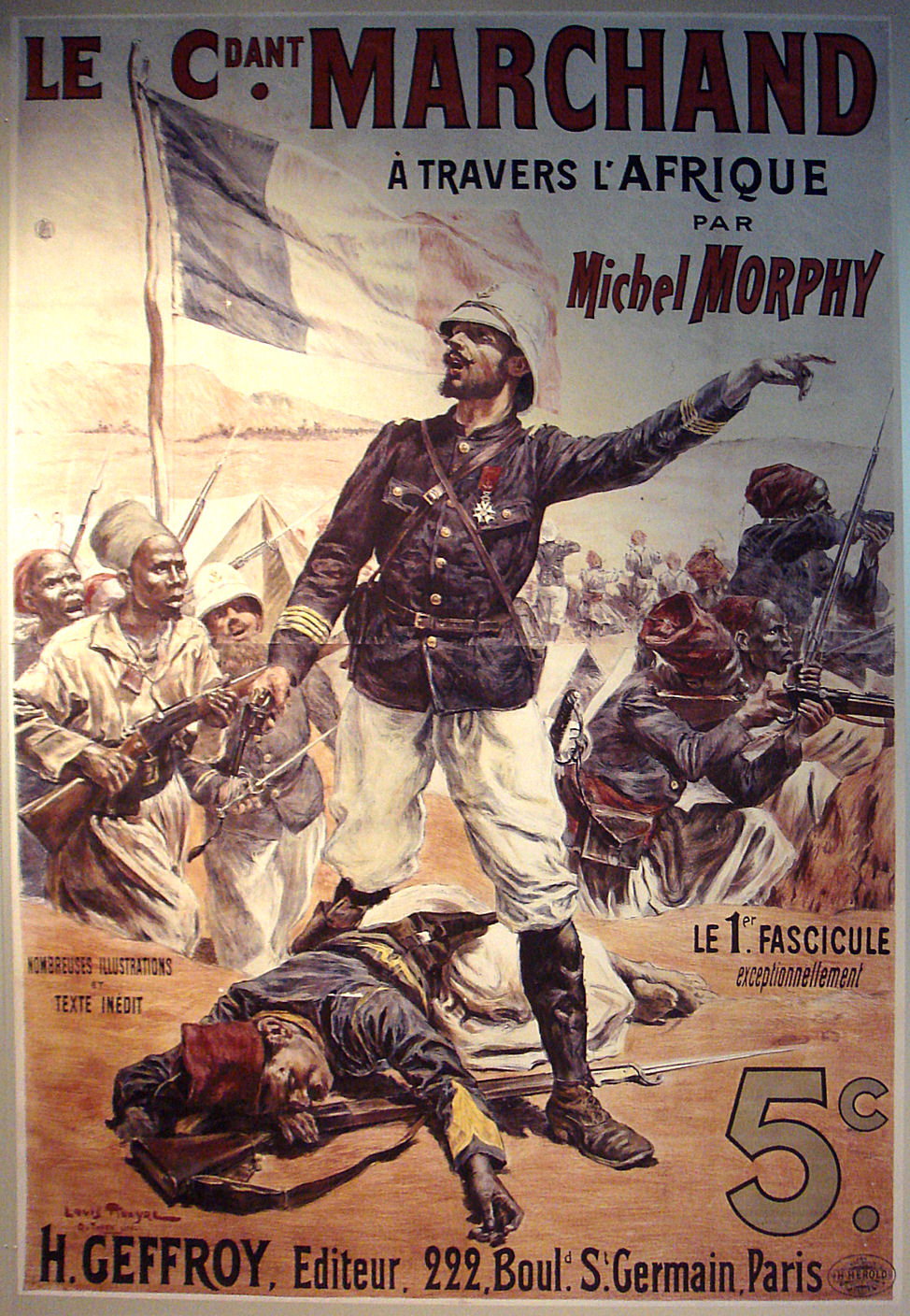
Major Jean-Baptiste Marchand led colonial France into the Fashoda incident against more powerful British forces in Sudan, but retreated before there was any combat.

==== Late 19th century ====
In the 1875–1898 era, tensions were high, especially over Egyptian and African issues. At several points, these issues brought the two nations to the brink of war; but the situation was always defused diplomatically. For two decades, there was peace—but it was "an armed peace, characterized by alarms, distrust, rancour and irritation." During the Scramble for Africa in the 1880s, the British and French generally recognised each other's spheres of influence. In an agreement in 1890 Great Britain was recognised in Bahr-el-Ghazal and Darfur, while Wadai, Bagirmi, Kanem, and the territory to the north and east of Lake Chad were assigned to France.

Khedive Isma'il Pasha, faced severe financial difficulties due to the high costs of modernization projects, including the construction of lavish domestic spending. The resulting debt crisis forced Egypt to sell a significant portion of its assets to foreign powers, notably rival Britain and France.

The Suez Canal, built by the French, became a joint British-French project in 1875, as both saw it as vital to maintaining their commerce with Asia and their empires. In 1882, ongoing civil disturbances in Egypt (see Urabi Revolt) prompted Britain to intervene, and inviting France to join in. France's expansionist Prime Minister Jules Ferry was out of office, and the government was unwilling. Britain established a protectorate, and opinion in France later put this action down to English duplicity. Meanwhile the two nations established co-ownership of Vanuatu, a small island in the Pacific. The Anglo-French Convention of 1882 was also signed to resolve boundary disagreements in western Africa. Despite Germany's support for Great Britain in diplomacy "Egyptian Lever", In 1884, amidst the deliberations of the Berlin Conference and the Congo Question, Bismarck put forth a proposition for a provisional Franco-German entente, thereby indirectly exerting pressure on Britain. Nevertheless, this collaboration proved to be ephemeral and strategic, primarily functioning as a means to influence British colonial policy and enhance Germany's position without necessitating long-term alliance commitments. The understanding proved to be transient, lacking institutionalization, and primarily symbolic. With Bismarck's departure in 1890, a new chancellor's approach led to a shift, causing the Franco-German rapprochement dissipated.

One dangerous dispute occurred during the Fashoda Incident in 1898 when French troops tried to claim an area in the Southern Sudan. A much larger British force arrived from Egypt and demanded the French get out. France had failed. P.M.H. Bell says:

Between the two governments there was a brief battle of wills, with the British insisting on immediate and unconditional French withdrawal from Fashoda. The French had to accept these terms, amounting to a public humiliation....Fashoda was long remembered in France as an example of British brutality and injustice."

Fashoda was a diplomatic victory for the British because Paris realised that in the long run it needed friendship with London, especially in case of a war between France and Germany.

The Fashoda Incident also had broader implications, including a temporary turnabout in France's revanchist policy toward Germany and the potential for a Franco-German alliance against Britain. Historians can observe how the altered geopolitical balance had global effects in the post-Fashoda colonial era, perhaps it could have led to a Franco-German friendship treaty during the war in the Transvaal and persisted until the secret Björkö protocol of 1905, which would have guaranteed Germany a central role among the Entente powers instead of Great Britain. This alongside German diplomatic inaction is considered a missed strategic opportunity to reshape alliances with potential inclusion of Austria-Hungary and Italy if Britain and Germany allied thus revived the pre-1815 old coalition alliance, reshaping the balance in Europe and colonial theatres before the Great War or prevented the war altogether. Britain perhaps move away from Franco-Russian rapprochement.

=== 20th century ===
==== The Entente Cordiale ====
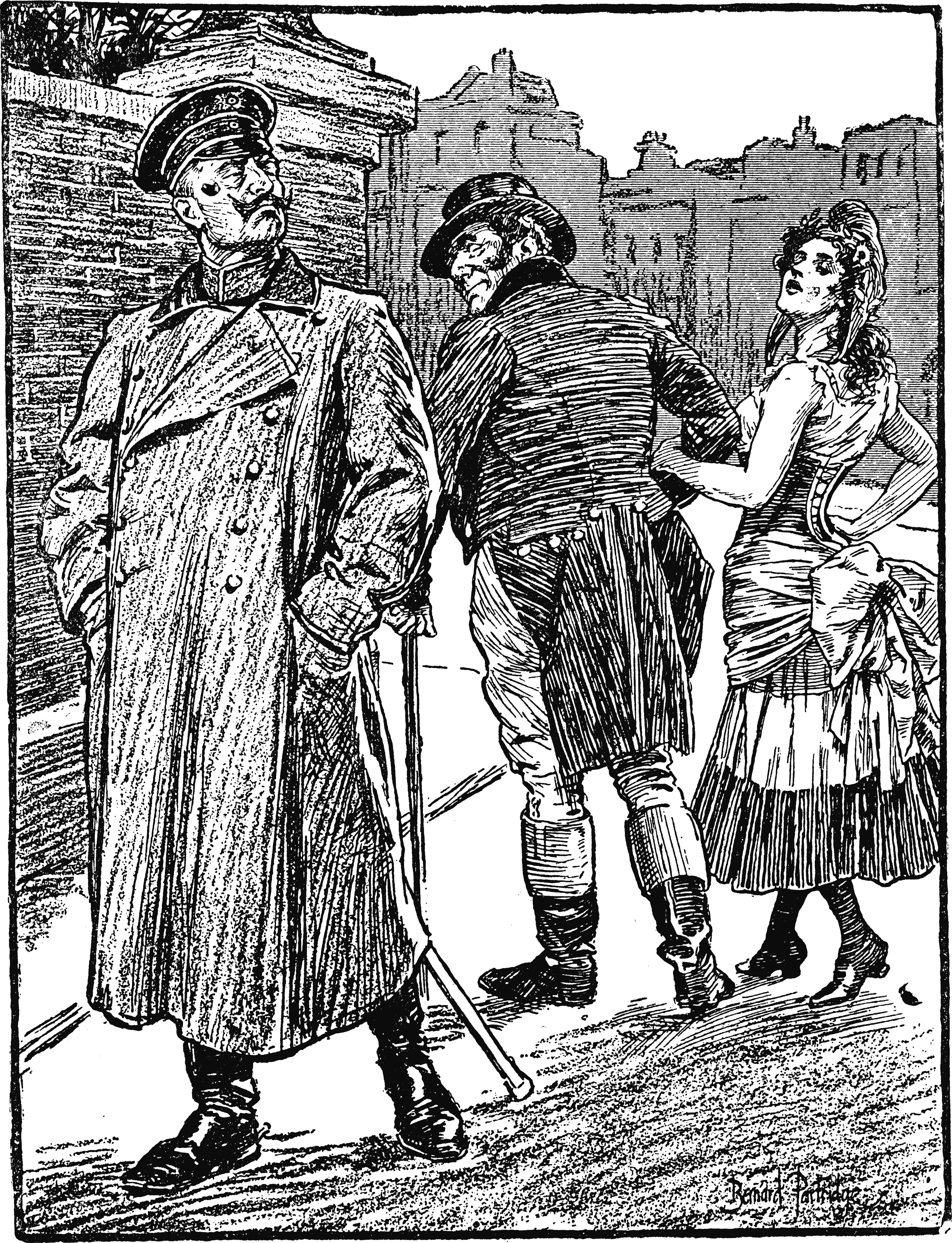
A cartoon on the Entente Cordiale from the German perspective.

From about 1900, Francophiles in Britain and Anglophiles in France began to spread a study and mutual respect and love of the culture of the country on the other side of the English Channel. Francophile and Anglophile societies developed, further introducing Britain to French food and wine, and France to English sports like rugby. French and English were already the second languages of choice in Britain and France respectively. Eventually this developed into a political policy as the new united Germany was seen as a potential threat. Louis Blériot, for example, crossed the Channel in an aeroplane in 1909. Many saw this as symbolic of the connection between the two countries. This period in the first decade of the 20th century became known as the Entente Cordiale, and continued in spirit until the 1940s. The signing of the Entente Cordiale also marked the end of almost a millennium of intermittent conflict between the two nations and their predecessor states, and the formalisation of the peaceful co-existence that had existed since the end of the Napoleonic Wars in 1815. Up to 1940, relations between Britain and France were closer than those between Britain and the US. This also started the beginning of the French and British Special Relationship. After 1907 the British fleet was built up to stay far ahead of Germany. However, Britain nor France committed itself to entering a war if Germany attacked the other.

In 1904, Paris and London agreed that Britain would establish a protectorate over Egypt, and France would do the same over Morocco. Germany objected, and the conference at Algeciras in 1906 settled the issue as Germany was outmaneuvered.

==== First World War ====
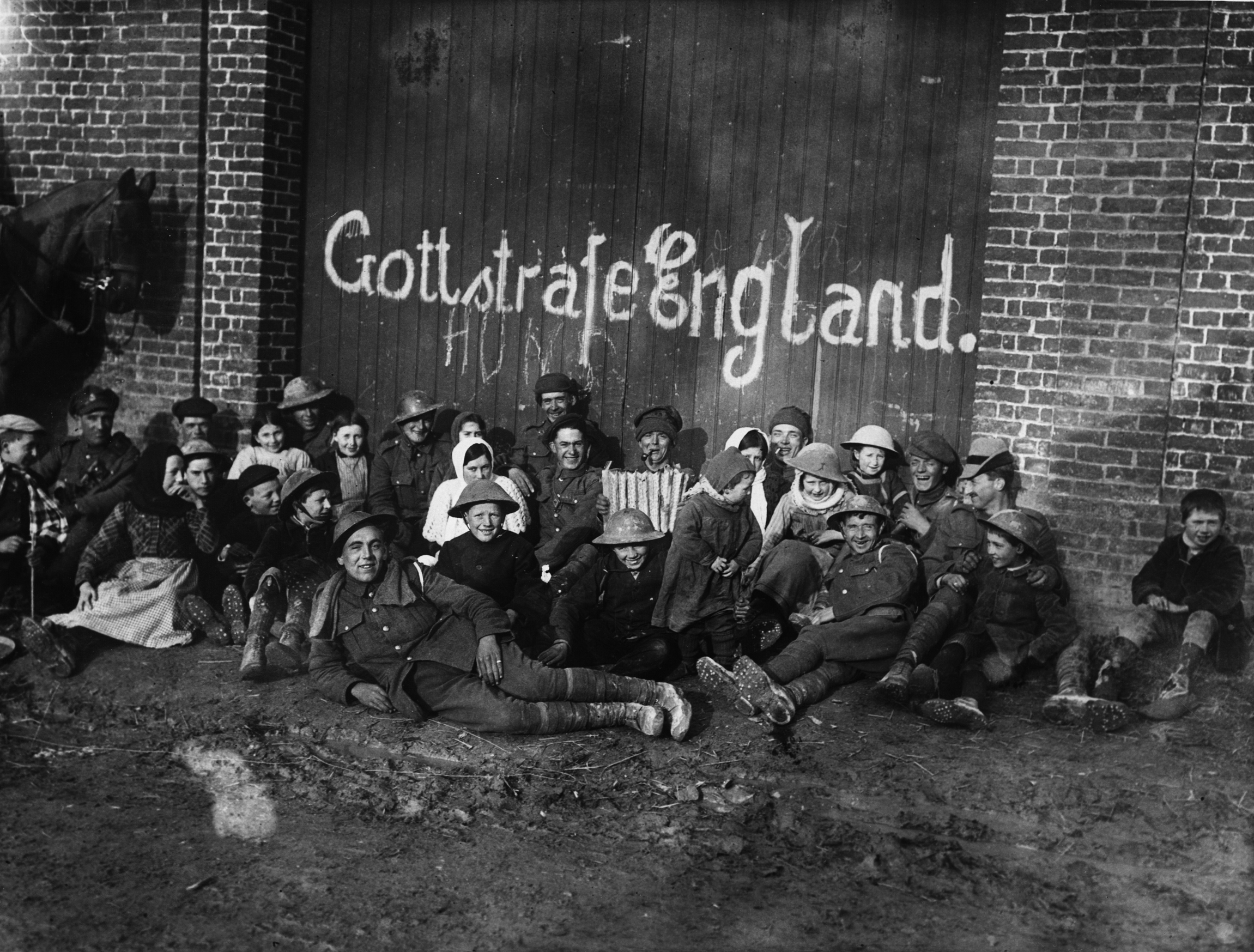
British soldiers and French civilians next to the slogan May God punish England painted on a wall by German troops in France, 1 January 1918

Britain tried to stay neutral as the First World War opened in summer 1914, as France joined in to help its ally Russia according to its treaty obligations. Britain had no relevant treaty obligations except one to keep Belgium neutral, and was not in close touch with the French leaders. Britain entered when the German army invaded neutral Belgium (on its way to attack Paris); that was intolerable. It joined France, sending a small expeditionary force to fight on the Western Front, later reinforced by volunteers and conscripts to form a large army.

There was close co-operation between the British and French forces. French Commander-in-Chief Joseph Joffre worked to coordinate Allied military operations and to mount a combined Anglo-French offensive on the Western Front. The result was the great Battle of the Somme in 1916 with massive casualties on both sides and only limited gains. Paul Painlevé took important decisions during 1917 as France's war minister and then, for nine weeks, premier. With some reservations, he promoted the Nivelle Offensive—which failed badly and drove the French Army to mutiny. The disasters at Passchendaele hurt Britain, its army and civil-military relations. The positive result was the decision to form the Supreme War Council that led to unity of Allied command. Meanwhile Russia collapsed in 1917 and Germany's victory enabled it to move its armies in the east to the Western Front in 1918. While Germany was cut off from, its colonies, the British and French empires came through with manpower and supplies. The Germans, short of food and soldiers, were overwhelmed in 1918 by the combined alliance powers of the British, French, and American forces.

==== Treaty of Versailles ====
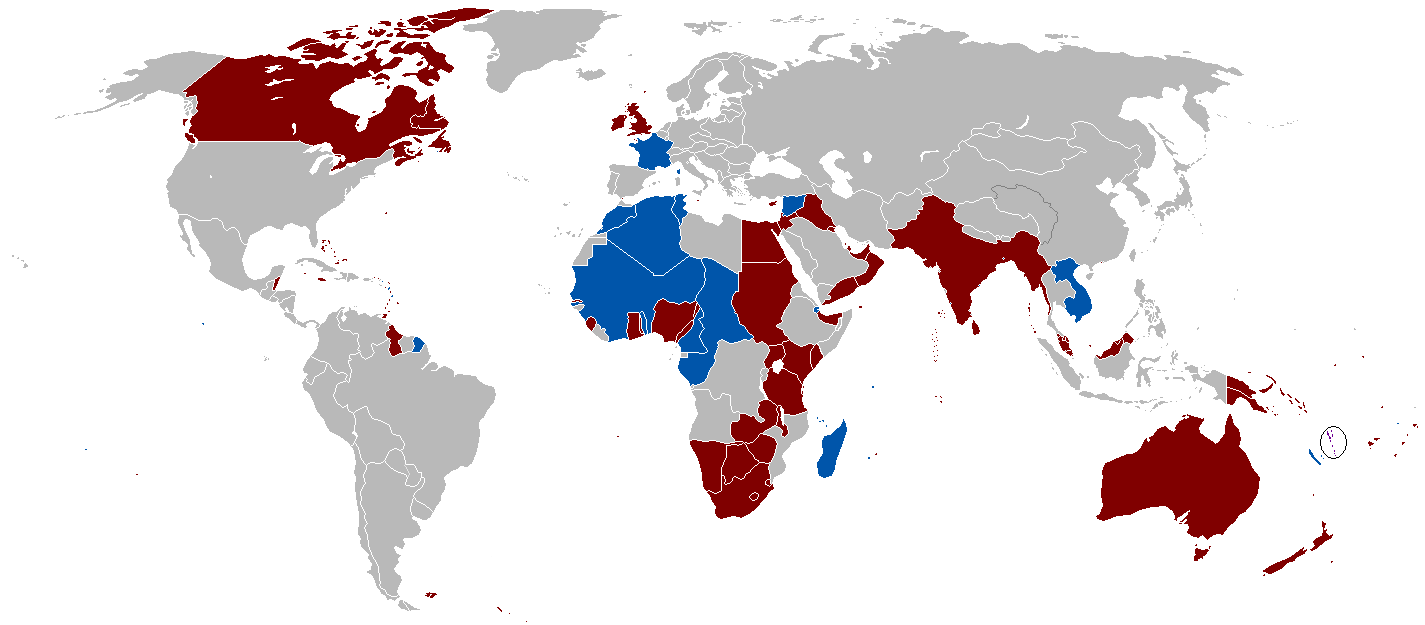
The British (red) and French (blue) colonial empires reached their peaks after the First World War, a reflection of the power of their alliance.

Following the war, at the Treaty of Versailles the British and French worked closely with the Americans to dominate the main decisions. Both were also keen to protect and expand their empires, in the face of calls for self-determination. On a visit to London, French leader Georges Clemenceau was hailed by the British crowds. Lloyd George was given a similar reception in Paris.

Lloyd George worked hard to moderate French demands for revenge. Clemenceau wanted terms to cripple Germany's war potential that were too harsh for Wilson and Lloyd George. A compromise was reached whereby Clemenceau softened his terms and the U.S. and Britain promised a Security Treaty that would guarantee armed intervention by both if Germany invaded France. The British ratified the treaty on condition the U.S. ratified. In the United States Senate, the Republicans were supportive, but Wilson insisted this security treaty be closely tied to the overall Versailles Treaty, and Republicans refused and so it never came to a vote in the Senate. Thus there was no promise of American or British military aid to defend France.

Britain tried hard to moderate French revenge toward Germany, as in the Locarno Treaties. Under Prime Minister Ramsay MacDonald in 1923–24, Britain took the lead in getting France to accept an American solution to the issue of reparations through the Dawes Plan and the Young Plan. The Dawes Plan (1924–1929) stabilised the German currency and lowered reparations payments, allowing Germany to access capital markets in New York for the money it owed the Allies in reparations.

==== 1920s ====
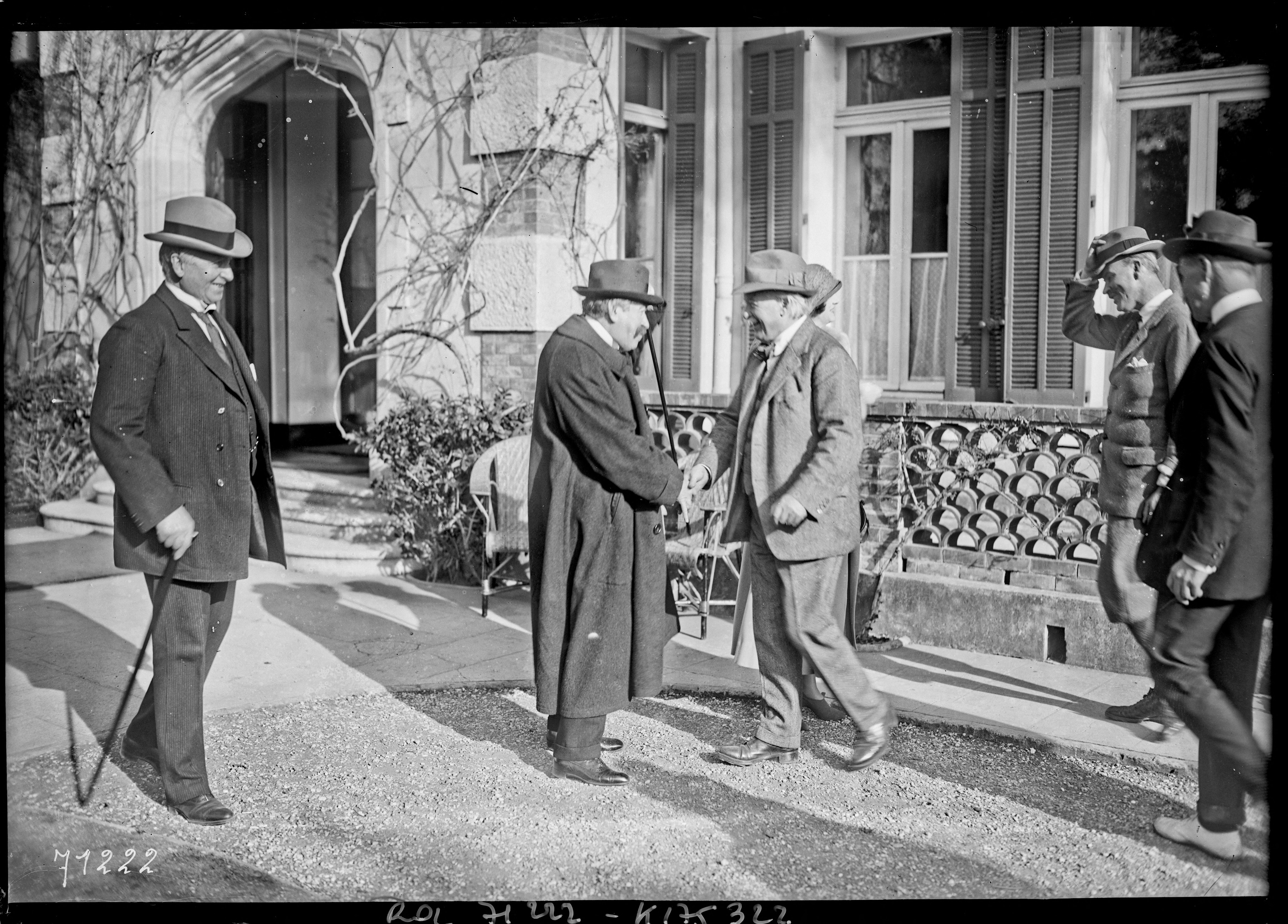
Prime ministers Aristide Briand and David Lloyd George meeting at the post-war Cannes Conference in 1922

Both states joined the League of Nations, and both signed agreements of defence of several countries, most significantly Poland. The Treaty of Sèvres split the Middle East between the two states, in the form of mandates. However the outlook of the nations were different during the inter-war years; while France saw itself inherently as a European power, Britain enjoyed close relationships with Australia, Canada and New Zealand and supported the idea of imperial free trade, a form of protectionism that would have seen large tariffs placed on goods from France. In Siam (present-day Thailand), it was surrounded by the European colonies in Southeast Asia led by the British in Burma and Malaysia and the French in Vietnam as part of French Indochina in 1920s.

In the 1920s, financial instability was a major problem for France, and other nations as well. it was vulnerable to short-term concerted action by banks and financial institutions by heavy selling or buying, in the financial crisis could weaken governments, and be used as a diplomatic threat. Premier and Finance Minister Raymond Poincaré decided to stabilise the franc to protect against political currency manipulation by Germany and Britain. His solution in 1926 was a return to a fixed parity against gold. France was not able to turn the tables and use short-term financial advantage as leverage against Britain on important policy matters.

In general, France and Britain were aligned in their position on major issues. A key reason was the Francophile position of Foreign Minister Austen Chamberlain, and the ambassador to Paris the Marquess of Crewe (1922–28). They promoted a pro-French policy regarding French security and disarmament policy, the later stages of the Ruhr crisis, the implementation of the Geneva Protocol, the Treaty of Locarno and the origins of the Kellogg-Briand Pact. The high point of cooperation came with the Treaty of Locarno in 1925, which brought Germany into good terms with France and Britain. However, relations with France became increasingly tense because Chamberlain grew annoyed that foreign minister Aristide Briand's diplomatic agenda did not have at its heart a reinvigorated Entente Cordiale.

Furthermore, Britain thought disarmament was the key to peace but France disagreed because of its profound fear of German militarism. London decided Paris really sought military dominance of Europe. Before 1933, most Britons saw France, not Germany, as the chief threat to peace and harmony in Europe. France did not suffer as severe an economic recession, and was the strongest military power, but still it refused British overtures for disarmament. Anthony Powell, in his A Dance to the Music of Time, said that to be anti-French and pro-German in the 1920s was considered the height of progressive sophistication.

==== Appeasement of Germany ====
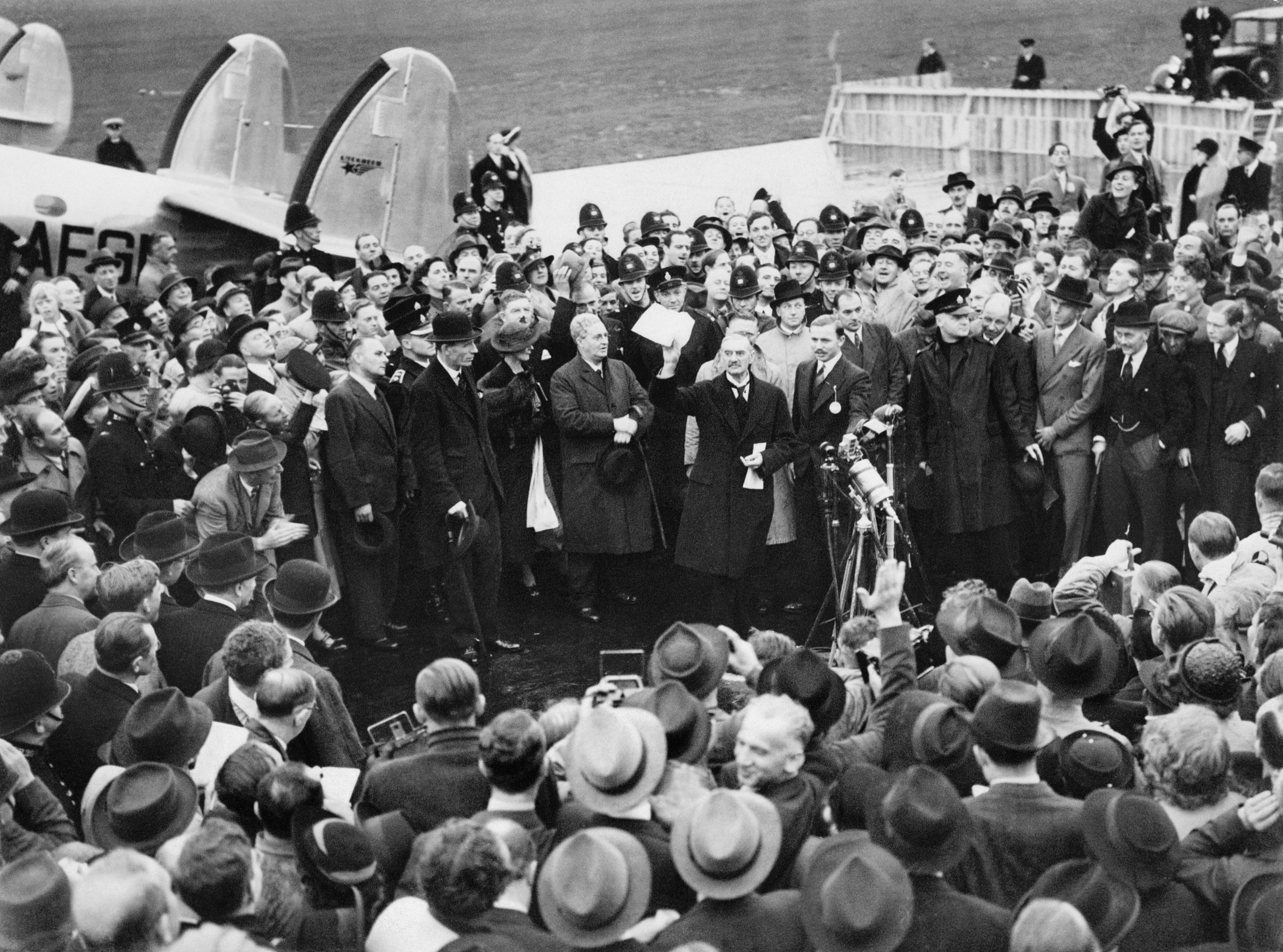
Both states initially pursued a policy of appeasement towards Nazi Germany. When this failed, they both declared war in September 1939 in response to the German invasion of Poland.

In the 1930s, Britain and France coordinated their policies toward the dictatorships of Mussolini's Italy and Hitler's Germany. However, public opinion did not support going to war again, so the diplomats sought diplomatic solutions, but none worked. Efforts to use the League of Nations to apply sanctions against Italy for its invasion of Ethiopia failed. France supported the "Little Entente" of Czechoslovakia, Romania, and Yugoslavia. It proved much too weak to deter Germany.

The Anglo-German Naval Agreement was signed between Britain and Nazi Germany in 1935, allowing Hitler to reinforce his navy. It was regarded by the French as the ruining of the anti-Hitlerian Stresa front. Britain and France collaborated closely especially in the late 1930s regarding Germany, based on informal promises with no written treaty. Efforts were made to negotiate a treaty but they failed in 1936, underscoring French weakness.

In the years leading up to World War II, both countries followed a similar diplomatic path of appeasement of Germany. As Nazi intentions became clear, France pushed for a harder line but the British demurred, believing diplomacy could solve the disputes. The result was the Munich Agreement of 1938 that gave Germany control of parts of Czechoslovakia settled by Germans. In early 1939, Germany took over all of Czechoslovakia and began threatening Poland. Appeasement had failed, and both Britain and France raced to catch up with Germany in weaponry.

=== Second World War ===
After guaranteeing the independence of Poland, both declared war on Germany on the same day, 3 September 1939, after the Germans ignored an ultimatum to withdraw from the country. When Germany began its attack on France in 1940, British troops and French troops again fought side by side. Eventually, after the Germans came through the Ardennes, it became evident that France would not be able to fend off the German attack. The final bond between the two nations was so strong that members of the British cabinet had proposed a temporary union of the two countries for the sake of morale: the plan was drawn up by Jean Monnet, who later created the Common Market. The idea was not popular with a majority on either side, and the French government felt that, in the circumstances, the plan for union would reduce France to the level of a British Dominion. When London ordered the withdrawal of the British Expeditionary Force from France without telling French and Belgian forces and then refused to provide France with further reinforcements of aircraft the proposal was definitively turned down. Later The Free French resistance, led by Charles de Gaulle, were formed in London, after de Gaulle gave his famous 'Appeal of 18 June', broadcast by the BBC. De Gaulle declared himself to be the head of the one and only true government of France, and gathered the Free French Forces around him.

Prime Minister Winston Churchill and General Charles de Gaulle at Marrakesh, January 1944

==== War against Vichy France ====
After the preemptive destruction of a large part of the French fleet by the British at Mers-el-Kebir (3 July 1940), as well as a similar attack on French ships in Oran on the grounds that they might fall into German hands, there was nationwide anti-British indignation and a long-lasting feeling of betrayal in France. In southern France a collaborative government known as Vichy France was set up on 10 July. It was officially neutral, but metropolitan France came increasingly under German control. The Vichy government controlled Syria, Madagascar, and French North Africa and French troops and naval forces therein. Eventually, several important French ships joined the Free French Forces.

One by one de Gaulle took control of the French colonies, beginning with central Africa in autumn`1940, and gained recognition from Britain but not the United States. An Anglo-Free French attack on Vichy territory was repulsed at the Battle of Dakar in September 1940. Washington maintained diplomatic relations with Vichy (until October 1942) and avoided recognition of de Gaulle. Churchill, caught between the U.S. and de Gaulle, tried to find a compromise.

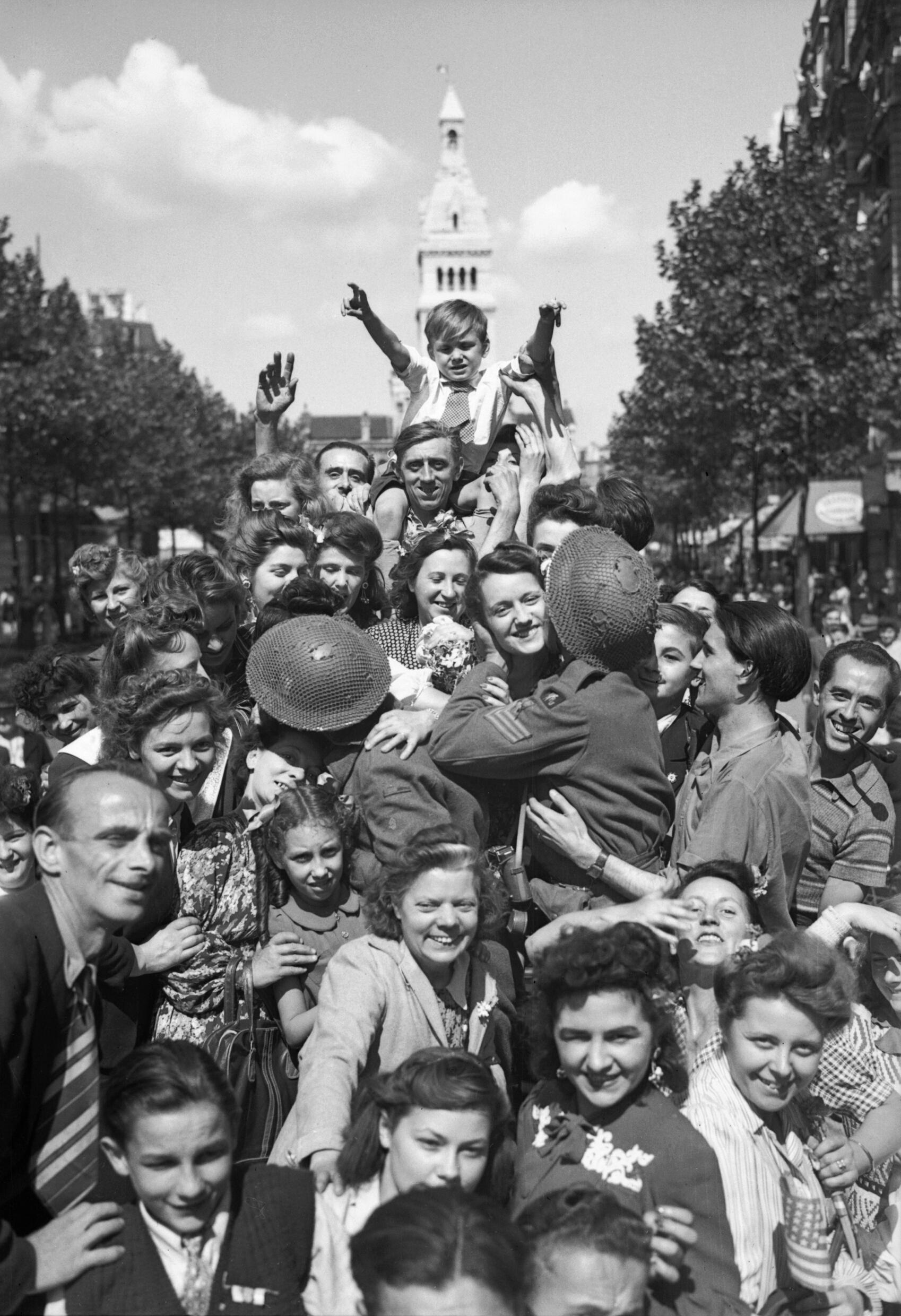
British troops are greeted by cheering crowds in Paris, 26 August 1944

From 1941, British Empire and Commonwealth forces invaded Vichy controlled territory in Africa, the Indian Ocean and the Middle East. The first began in 1941 during the campaign against Syria and the Lebanon assisted with Free French troops. In two months of bitter fighting the region was seized and then put under Free French control. Around the same time after the Italian defeat in East Africa, Vichy controlled French Somaliland subsequently became blockaded by British and Free French forces. In a bloodless invasion the colony fell in mid 1942. In May 1942, the Vichy controlled island of Madagascar was invaded. In a seven-month campaign the island was seized by British Empire forces. Finally in the latter half of 1942, the British with the help of US forces took part in the successful invasion of French North Africa in Operation Torch. Most Vichy forces switched sides afterwards to help the allied cause during the Tunisian Campaign fighting as part of the British First Army.

==== Levant Crisis ====
Following D-Day, relations between the two peoples were at a high, as the British were greeted as liberators and remained so till the surrender of Germany in May 1945. At the end of that month, however, French troops, with their continued occupation of Syria, had tried to quell nationalist protests there. With heavy Syrian civilian casualties reported, Churchill demanded a ceasefire. With none forthcoming, he ordered British forces into Syria from Jordan. When they reached Damascus in June, the French were then escorted and confined to their barracks at gunpoint. That became known as the Levant Crisis and almost brought Britain and France to the point of conflict. De Gaulle raged against 'Churchill's ultimatum' and reluctantly arranged a ceasefire. Syria gained independence the following year and France labelled British measures as a 'stab in the back'.
