= Military uniform =

Standardised military dress

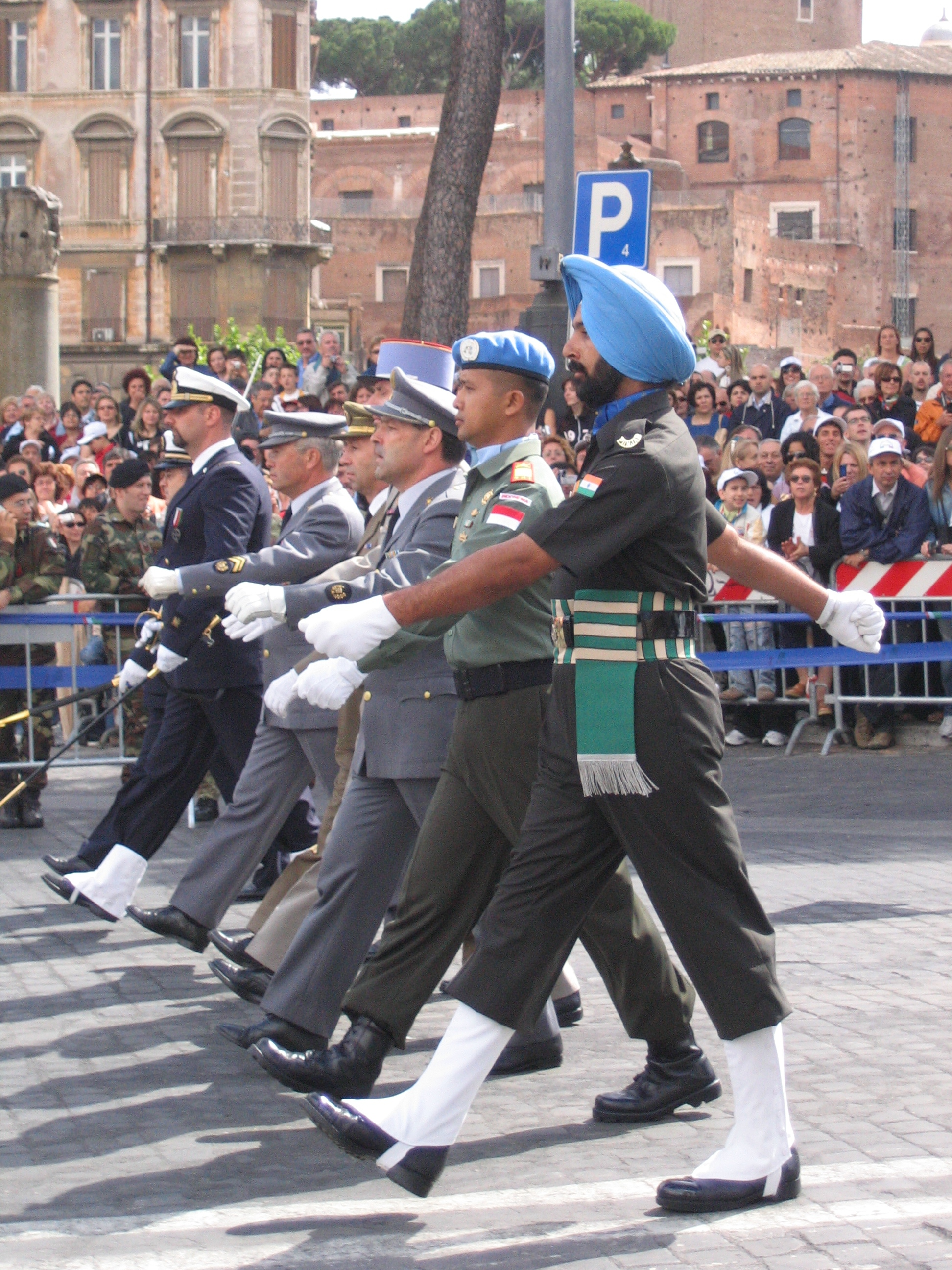
Italian, French, Spanish, Portuguese, Indonesian and Indian military personnel in uniform during a parade in Rome, Italy

A military uniform is a standardised form of dress worn by members of an armed force or paramilitary unit to identify their service, rank, role and affiliation.

Military dress and styles have gone through significant changes over the centuries, from colourful and elaborate, ornamented clothing until the 19th century, to utilitarian camouflage uniforms for field and battle purposes from World War I (1914–1918) on. Military uniforms in the form of standardised and distinctive dress, intended for identification and display, are typically a sign of organised military forces equipped by a central authority.

Military uniforms differ not only according to military units but tend to also be offered in different levels of formality in accordance with Western dress codes: full dress uniform for formal wear, mess dress uniform for formal evening wear, service dress uniform for informal wear, and combat uniform (also called "battle/field dress") which would equal casual wear. Sometimes added to the casual wear category is physical training uniforms. The study used to design and produce military uniforms is referred to as military textile science.

== History ==
As far back as antiquity, there were various attempts to create standardised military uniforms, such as the introduction of the lorcia segmentata in the 1st century AD in the Roman Empire or, in China, the zhanpao (战) war cloak However, the standardised uniform did not develop until the 17th century, with the ever-increasing use of firearms.

=== Post-classical era ===
The feudal system of Western Europe provided instances of distinguishing features denoting allegiance to one or another lord. These however seldom went beyond colours and patterns painted on shields or embroidered on surcoats. Orders of military monks such as the Knights Templar or Hospitaller wore mantles respectively of white (with red crosses on the shoulder) and of black (later red with white crosses) over the usual pattern of armour for their periods. In the later part of the Medieval period instances of standardised clothing being issued for particular campaigns began to occur. English examples included the white coats worn by Norfolk levies recruited in 1296 and the green and white clothing that identified Cheshire archers during the 14th century.

The regular thematic (provincial) and Tagmata (central) troops of the Byzantine Empire (East Roman) are the first known soldiers to have had what would now be considered regimental or unit identification. During the 10th century, each of the cavalry "banda" making up these forces is recorded as having plumes and other distinctions in a distinctive colour. Officers wore a waist sash or pekotarion, which may have been of different colours according to rank.

=== Early modern era ===
==== European regimental dress ====
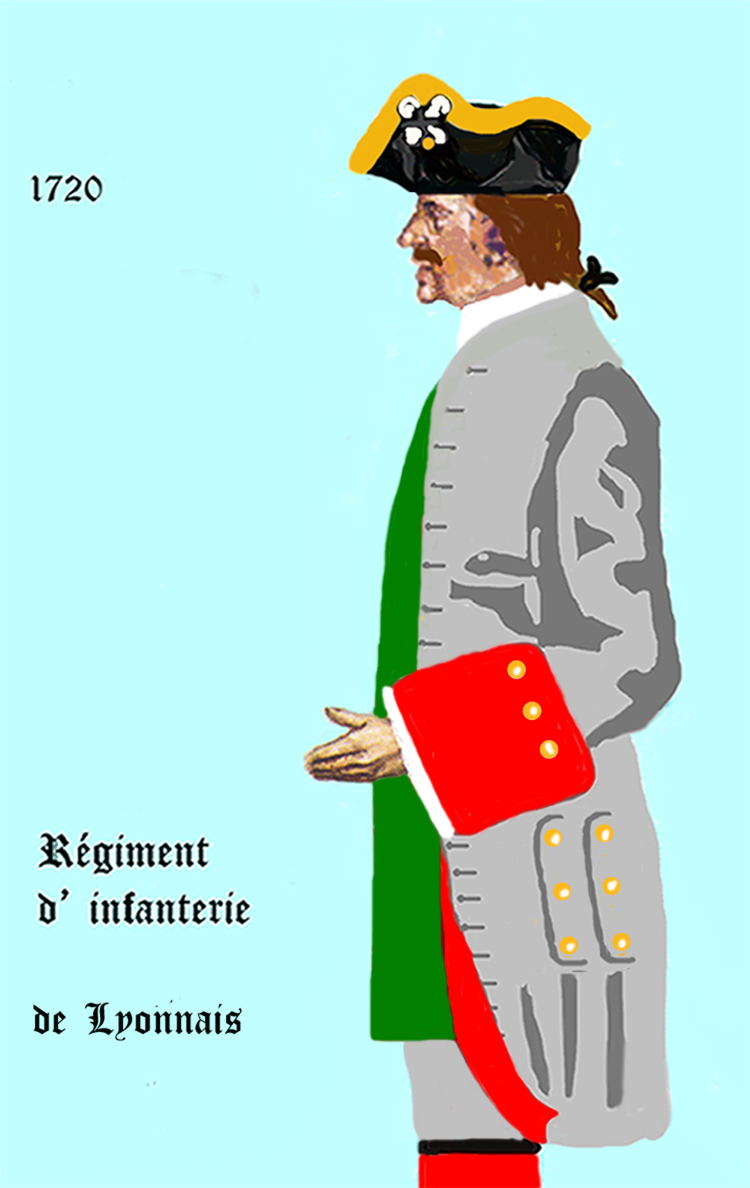
Facing colours were introduced to distinguish the various regiments. Here, the Régiment du Lyonnais with red and green facings on the standard grey uniform (1720–1734)

The styles and decoration of military uniforms varied immensely with the status, image, and resources of the military throughout the ages. Uniform dress became the norm with the adoption of regimental systems, initially by the French army in the mid-17th century. Before 1600 a few German and Dutch regiments had worn red or yellow coats. From about 1626 onwards some Swedish infantry had been issued with standard coloured dress under Gustavus Adolphus (hence his "yellow" or "blue" regiments). However, most levies of the 15th and 16th centuries wore civilian dress and regiments were dressed at the expense of their colonels in whatever style and colours the colonel preferred. Even Royal guards would sometimes only be issued with distinctive coloured or embroidered surcoats to wear over ordinary clothing. To help armies distinguish friend from foe, scarves, pieces of foliage, or other makeshift identification known as "field signs" would be worn, (a practice still recognised under international humanitarian law and the laws of war as a "distinctive sign"). Field signs were easily removed or donned, as in the example of John Smith, a squire on the Royalist side who at the Battle of Edgehill put on the orange scarf of the Parliamentarians and with no more elaborate disguise recaptured the royal standard from the Earl of Essex's own secretary.

By this time, in France at least, the general character of the clothes and accoutrements to be worn on various occasions was strictly regulated by orders. But uniformity of clothing was not to be expected so long as the "enlistment" system prevailed and soldiers were taken in and dismissed at the beginning and end of every campaign. The beginnings of uniform are therefore to be found in truly national armies, in the Indelta of Gustavus Adolphus, and the English armies of the English Civil War. In the earlier years of the latter, though the richer colonels uniformed their men (for instance, the Marquess of Newcastle's "Whitecoats" and King Charles's own red-coated Lifeguard of foot), the rustics and the citizens turned out for war in their ordinary rough clothes, donning armour and sword-belt. But in 1645 the Long Parliament raised an army for permanent service, and the colonels became officials rather than proprietors. The New Model Army was clothed in the civilian costume of the date—ample coat, waistcoat, breeches, stockings and shoes (in the case of cavalry, boots)—but with the distinctive colour throughout the army of red and with regimental facings of various colours and breeches of grey. Soon afterwards the helmet was replaced by a grey broad-brimmed hat. From the coat was eventually evolved the tunic of the mid-19th century, and the hat became the cocked hat of a later generation, which generally disappeared during the decade of 1800–1810 to reappear in the late 19th and early 20th century, by which time it had its original form of a "slouch-hat." For service in Ireland the New Model Army's red coat was exchanged for one of russet colour, just as scarlet gave way to khaki for Indian service in the 19th century. The Ironsides cavalry, however, wore buff leather coats and armour long after the infantry had abandoned them.

Thus the principle ever since followed — uniform coat and variegated facings — was established. By choice or convenience the majority of the corps out of which the New Model Army was formed had come to be dressed in red, with facings according to the colonel's taste. In Austria sixty years afterwards events took the same course. The colonels there uniformed their men as they saw fit, but had, probably to obtain "wholesale" prices, agreed upon a serviceable colour, pearl grey. When in 1707 Prince Eugene procured the issue of uniform regulations, few line regiments had to be re-clothed. In France, as in England and Austria, the cavalry, still led by the wealthy classes rather than officered by the professional, was not uniformed upon an army system until after the infantry. But in 1688 six-sevenths of the French cavalry was uniformed in light grey with red facings; and about half the dragoon regiments had red uniforms and blue facings. The Marquis of Louvois, in creating a standing army, had introduced an infantry uniform as a necessary consequence. The native French regiments had light grey coats, the Swiss red, the German black and the Italian blue, with various facings. The French grey was probably decided upon, like the Austrian grey, as being a good "service" colour, which could be cheaply manufactured.

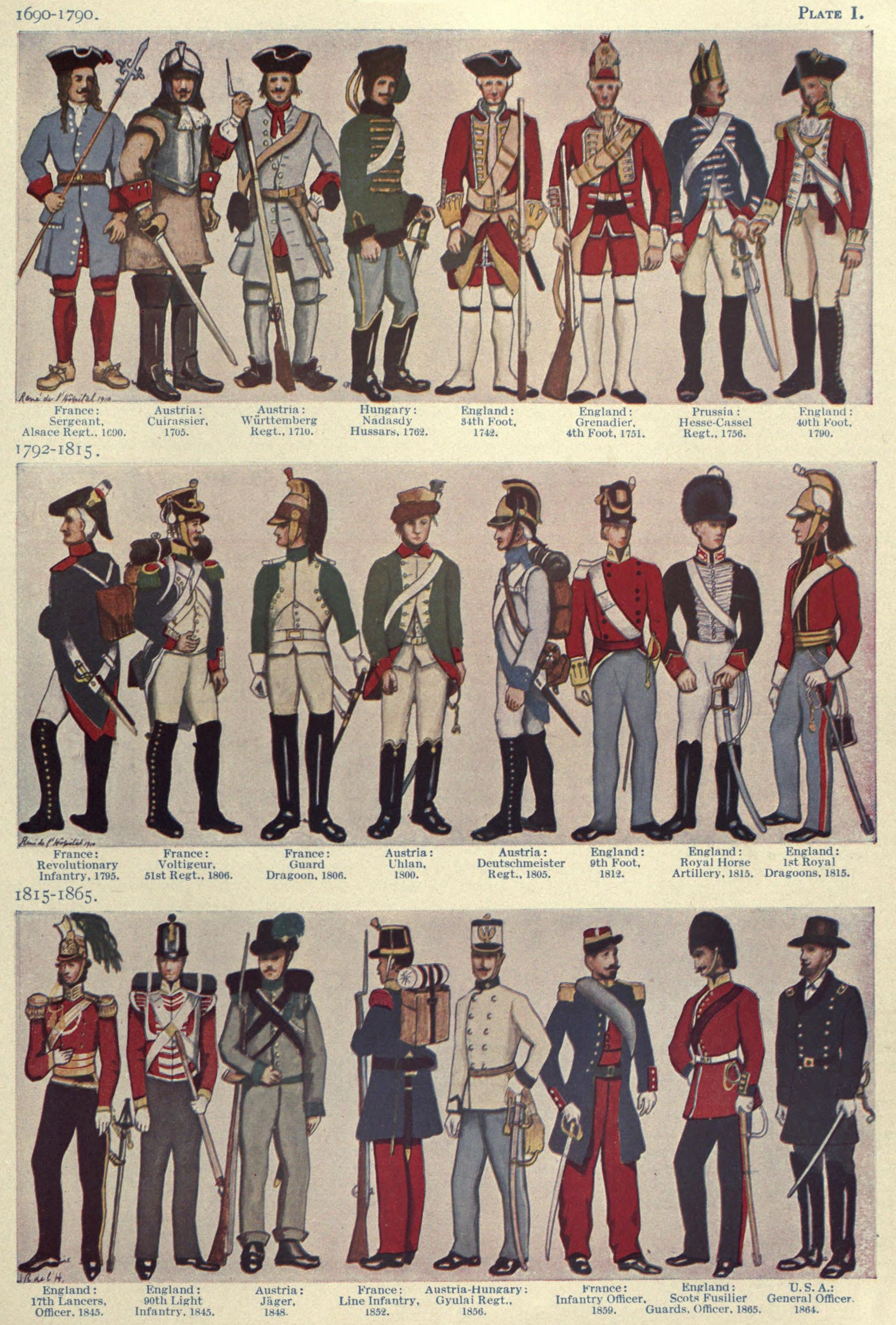
Uniforms used by Western military forces from 1670 to 1865

During the 18th century the normal military uniform in Europe comprised a standardised form of civilian dress (tricorn hat, long-skirted coat, waistcoat and breeches). One distinctively military feature were the long canvas gaiters which came up to mid-thigh and had multiple buttons. Dress was surprisingly standardised between European armies in cut and general outline. The distinction normally lay in colours: red coats for the British and Danes, light grey then white for the French, Spanish, and Austrian infantry, dark blue for the Prussians and Portuguese, green for the Russians, etc. Within each army different regiments were usually distinguished by "facings" — linings, turnbacks, and braiding on coats in colours that were distinctive to one or several regiments. The Royal Comtois Infantry Regiment of the French Army, for example, had large dark blue cuffs on its off-white coats. To a certain extent the functions required of a given group of soldiers were reflected in their dress. Thus artillery uniforms in most armies were usually of dark blue, for the practical reason that handling black powder would have soiled lighter coloured clothing. Infantry drummers and cavalry trumpeters often had "reverse" colours with coats the colour of the regimental facings and facings the colour of the regimental coats.

Officers (who paid for their own clothing) were slower to accept uniforms. During the late 17th century they were often dressed in individual styles and colours according to their own taste and means. In part this was because the uniform dress issued to the rank and file was considered a form of livery — the mark of a servant and demeaning to members of the social class from which officers came. One early practice in the French and other armies was for officers to wear coats of the facing colour of their regiments. Rank insignia as such was unknown until well into the 18th century. The gorget hanging from a chain around the neck (a last survival of medieval armour) was the only universally recognised mark of an officer until epaulettes developed from clusters of ribbons formerly worn on the shoulder. In the British army officers were ordered to adopt epaulettes by a clothing warrant dated 1768. Even when officers' uniforms became the subject of detailed regulation they remained easily distinguishable from those of other ranks, by the better quality and richness of the materials and trimmings used. Gold or silver braiding on the hats and coats of officers usually matched the bronze or pewter of the numerous buttons on regimental clothing. New uniforms were issued with surprising frequency in some 18th-century armies (once a year in the British service). It should, however, be remembered that a soldier had to march, parade, fight and sometimes sleep in the same garment and that such extras as greatcoats or working clothes were seldom issued until the end of the century.

==== Ottoman Empire ====
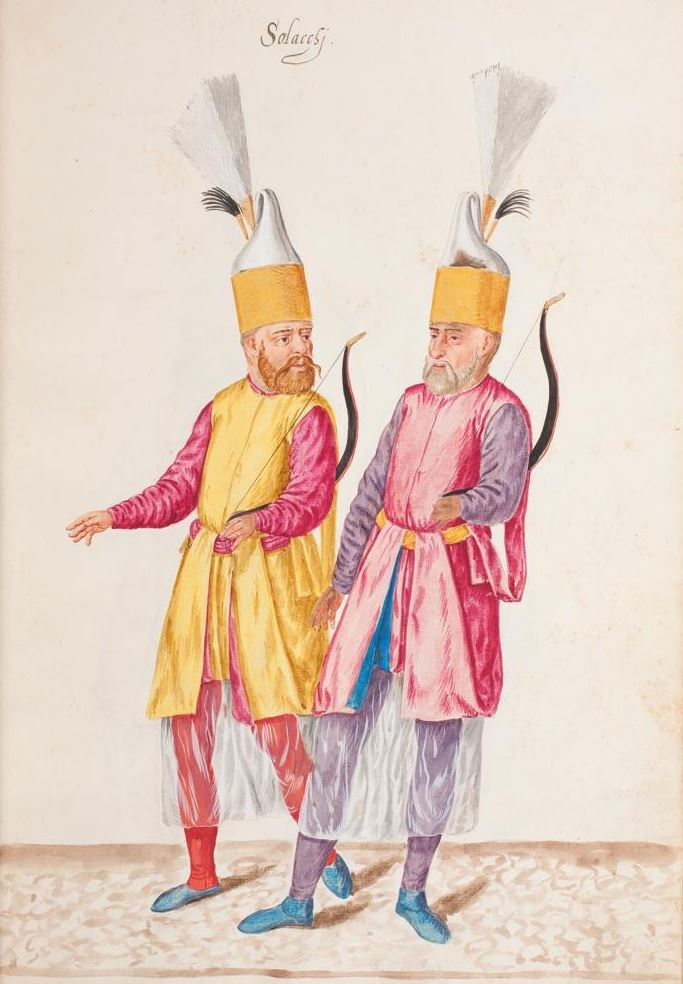
Solaks, the Janissary archer bodyguard of the Sultan by Lambert de Vos, c. 1575

The highly organised armies of the Ottoman Empire employed distinctive features of dress to distinguish one corps or class of soldier from another. An example would be the conical black hats of felt worn by the Deli cavalry of the early 19th century. However the basic costume was usually that of the tribal group or social class from which a particular class of warrior was drawn. As such it was sufficiently varied not to rank as "uniform" in the later sense. An elaborate system of colourful standards largely provided unit identification. Even the appearance of the Janissaries was likely to reflect individual means and taste, although red was a favoured colour and the white felt zarcola headdresses were similar. It was not until the reorganisation of the Ottoman Army by Sultan Mahmud II during the 1820s that completely standardised dress was issued.

=== Later modern era ===
The first fifteen years of the 19th century influenced the appearance of military uniforms until the 1850s. In particular, some uniforms of the Grande Armée – notably those of the cavalry regiments of the Imperial Guard – are considered as being amongst the most striking and distinctive of the time. The cost of the French uniforms varied widely, going from 200 to 250 francs for a line infantryman's outfit to 2000 francs for a cuirassier's uniform. Cavalrymen of the Guard had no fewer than 10 different uniforms. One justification for the expensive parade dresses of the Guard was that they would "lead the people of the conquered nations to regard the French uniforms with unreserved astonishment". As a general trend France and other European states replaced their bicornes by feathered shakos or crested helmets, while the coatee-type jacket replaced the combination of tailcoat and waistcoat.

The ornamental peak of the military uniform was reached in the early 19th century in Western Europe. Sometimes the Napoleonic Wars are identified as being the acme of colourful and ornate uniforms, but actually the several decades of relative peace that followed were a time of even more decorative styles and embellishments. The Napoleonic soldier on campaign was likely to present a shabby and nondescript appearance as unsuitable peacetime dress quickly deteriorated or was replaced with whatever local substitutes were available.

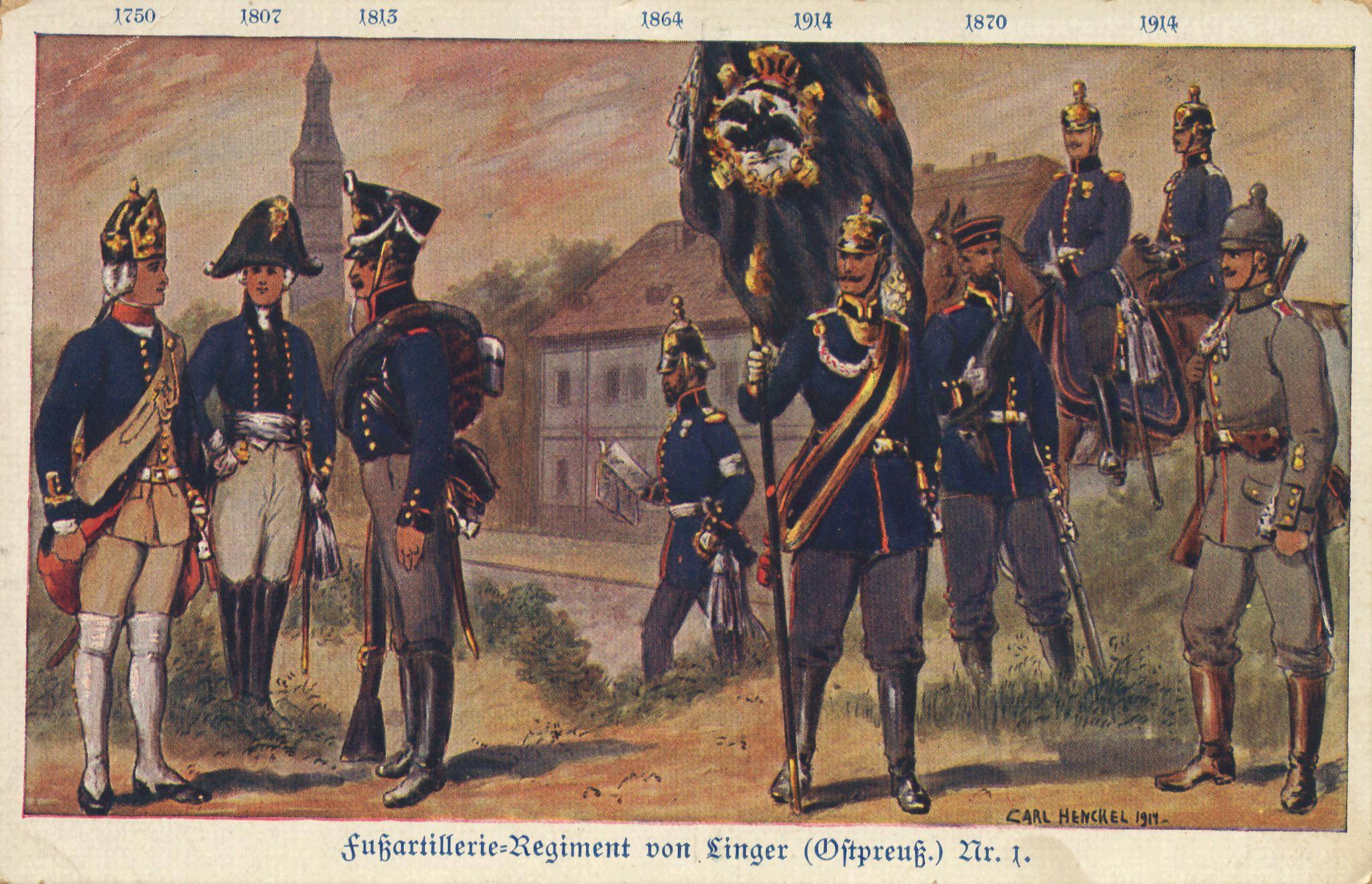
Uniforms used by the Prussian Army from 1701 to 1919

Until later on in the century dyes were primitive and different batches of uniforms worn by the same unit might present differing shades, especially after exposure to rain and sun. The white uniforms popular amongst many armies through the 18th and early 19th centuries soiled easily and had to be pipeclayed to retain any semblance of cleanliness. Green as worn by Jäger and Rifle regiments proved particularly prone to fading until suitable chemical dyes were devised in the 1890s. British soldiers were known for their striking red clothing (hence the name "Redcoats"). This was actually a fairly dull shade of madder red until the general adoption of scarlet for tunics in the 1870s.

==== Navies ====
In an early instance of military camouflage, the sailors of Imperial Rome are reported to have worn blue/grey tunics. However uniform dress was not a feature of navies (officers and marines excepted) until comparatively recent times. This may reflect the considerable difference in roles and conditions of service between sailors and soldiers.

No uniform was prescribed for the French Navy until a standardised suit for officers of blue and red was decreed in 1764. This evolved from optional blue clothing authorised by Royal decree as early as 1665, although practical grey, brown or black colours were worn at sea. In other 17th-18th navies of Mediterranean states red was a commonly worn colour.

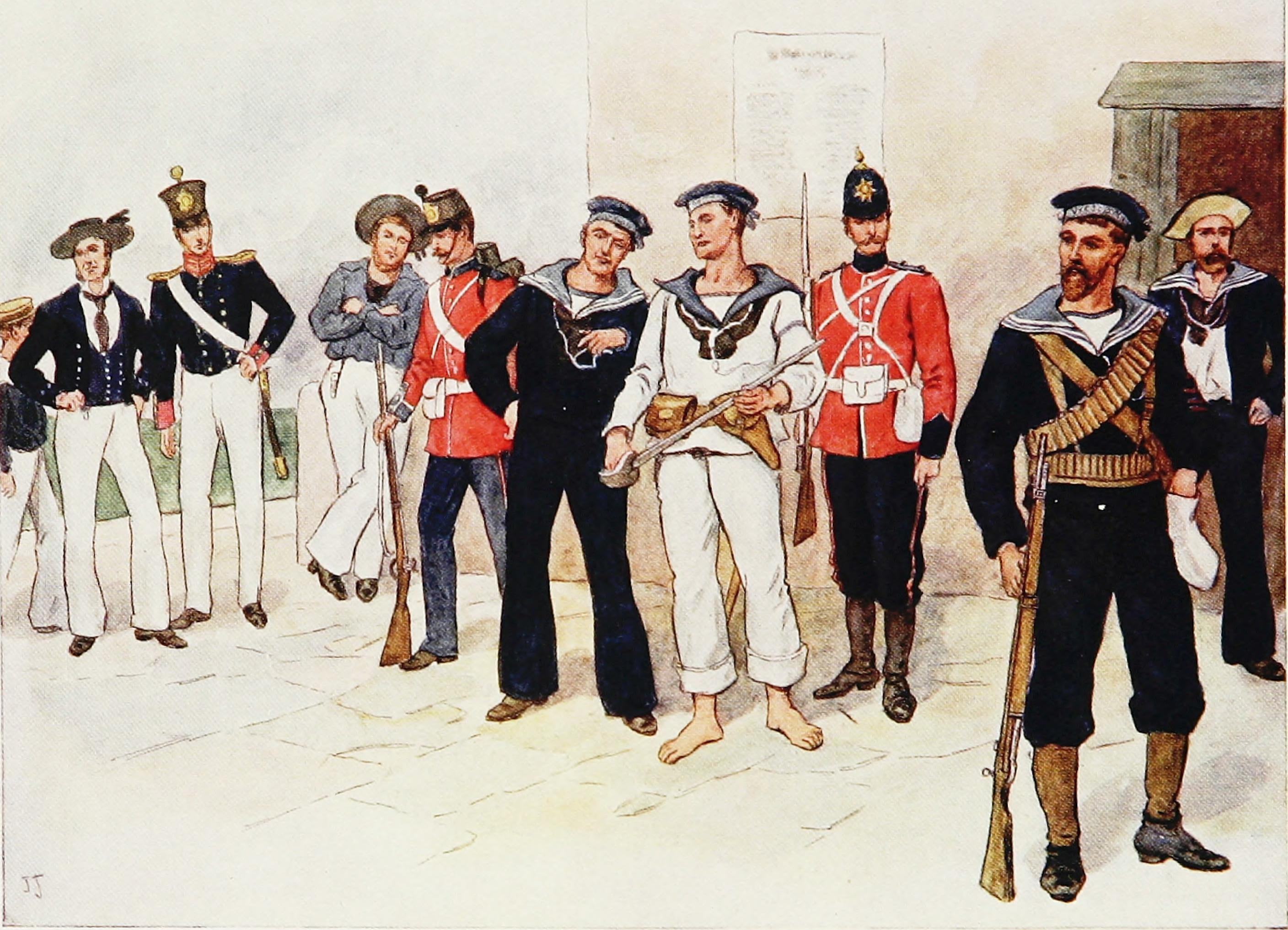
Uniforms used by the Royal Navy during the mid-19th century

Until the middle of the 19th century only officers and warrant officers in the Royal Navy wore regulated uniforms. Through the 18th century to the Napoleonic Wars navy officers had a form of dress broadly resembling that of army officers, though in dark blue with white facings. In the early 19th century Royal Navy officers developed a more distinctive form of uniform comprising (in full dress uniform) a cocked hat, dark blue coatee with white collar and cuffs, dark blue or white trousers, or breeches. Epaulettes and braiding were gold and varied according to rank. In a simplified form this dress (without the cocked hat) survives as the modern ceremonial dress for flag officers. Throughout this period sailors supplied or made their own clothing. Sailors developed traditional clothing suitable for their work: loose-fitting trousers with belts made of rope; tunics that slipped over the head, with arms to above the wrist so that the cloth would not foul in ropes passing through a cleat or pulley. For cold weather, a jumper was knitted from yarn or wool. For wet weather, old sail cloth was made into a coat (with hat or attached hood) that was waterproofed with tallow or fat. In these days, the officers would designate certain afternoons to "make and mend" (clothing). A sailor with little clothing to make or mend used this time as "time off". In January 1857 the decision was taken to issue complete uniforms to petty officers and seamen. This included features which can still be recognised in the Class I uniform of ratings in the modern Royal Navy – notably the wide blue collar with white tapes, a black neckerchief, white lanyard and blue or white jumper. The flared "bell bottom" trousers disappeared after the Second World War. Because of the global dominance of the Royal Navy from Trafalgar to the Second World War RN uniforms became the model for virtually all other navies. While certain distinctive features emerged – such as the red pompon worn on the crown of the French sailor's cap, the open fronted jacket of the German Navy or the white round cap of the U.S. Navy – the overall pattern remained standard until the development of specialist working or protective rigs during the Second World War.

==== American Civil War ====
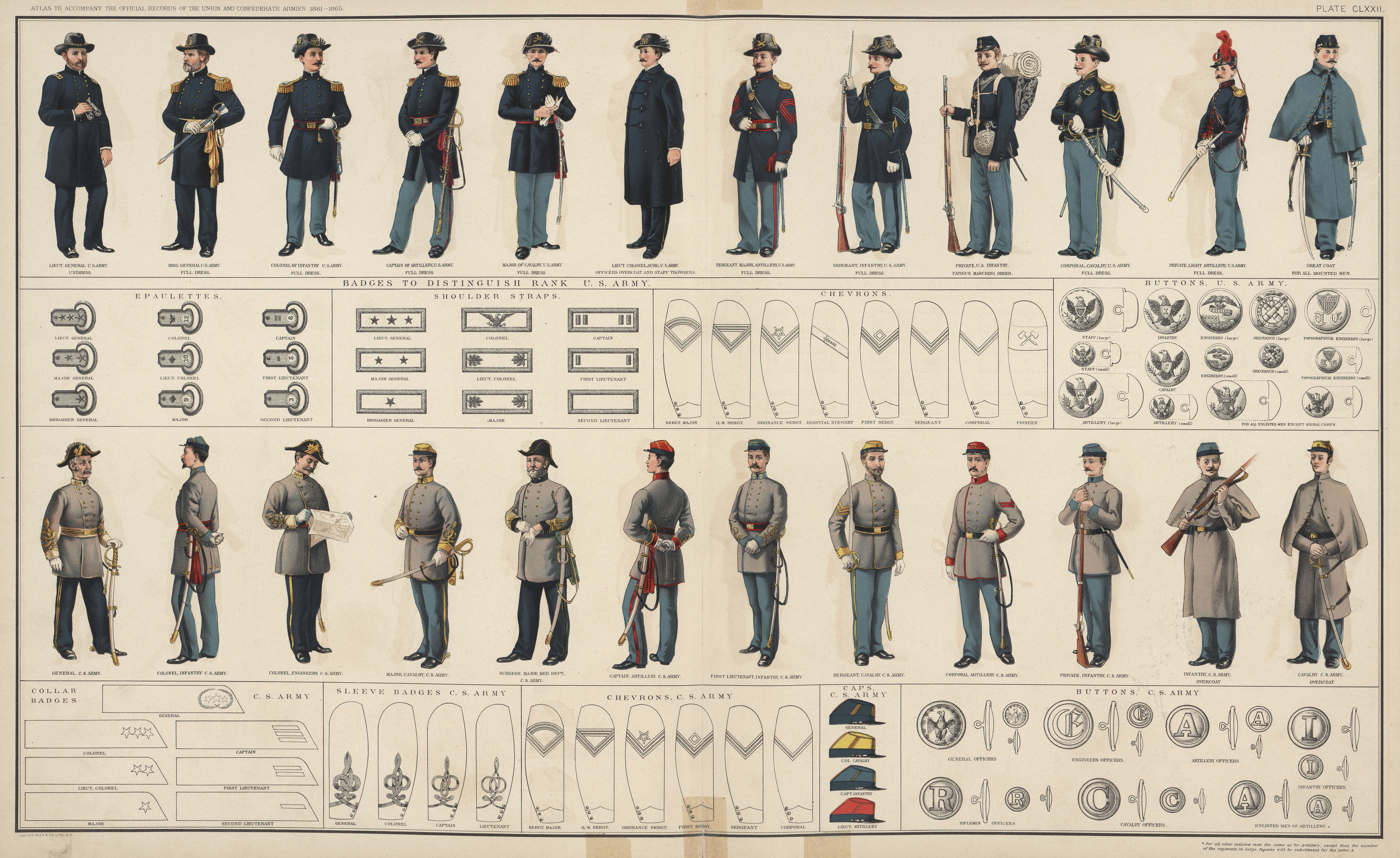
Colour plate from the War of the Rebellion Atlas depicting Union and Confederate uniforms

It is generally supposed that Union soldiers wore blue uniforms and Confederate soldiers wore grey ones. However, this was only a generalisation. Both the Union and the Confederacy drew up uniform regulations, but as a matter of practical reality neither side was able to fully equip its men at the outbreak of the war. Existing state units and quickly raised volunteer regiments on both sides wore a wide variety of styles and colours in the early stages of the war. Some regiments—such as the North's Berdan Sharpshooters and the South's Alexandria Rifles—had green uniforms, while the French zouave style was widely imitated.

The Union eventually got most of its men into regulation Federal blue but this often faded until it appeared grey. Originally the Confederate government relied on the "commutation" system which required the states to provide their own uniforms. While the commutation system was in place, many states were not able to provide an ample supply of uniforms and captured federal uniforms were common. Later in the war the Confederate national government provided uniforms from a central depot system, including the famous Richmond and Columbus depots. Many photographs of Confederate soldiers from later in the war (usually casualties) are wearing standardised uniforms. As Sherman's men marched across Georgia and up the Carolinas, they were cut off from supply by the Union and began wearing clothing of Confederate origin. Confederate soldiers used a variety of vegetable and imported dyes which would fade to a "butternut" colour.

==== End of bright colours ====
Until 1914 the majority of armies still provided colourful dress uniforms for all ranks, at least for parade and off-duty wear. These often retained distinctive features from the past. Most Russian troops, for example, wore the very dark green introduced by Peter the Great in 1700. German infantry generally wore the dark "Prussian blue" of the previous two centuries. This and other features of the historic Prussian Army uniform were generally adopted by the other German States as they fell under Prussian influence before and after the Franco-Prussian War of 1870. Bavarians, however, continued to wear light blue and Saxon regiments retained a number of distinctions after the establishment of the German Empire (1871). Two regiments of the Prussian Guard and one of the Russian were still issued with the brass mitre caps of the 18th-century grenadier. The British infantry retained their scarlet tunics for parade and "walking out" wear, while the bulk of French regiments wore red trousers with dark or light blue tunics. The infantry of the Austro-Hungarian Empire discarded their historic white tunics in 1868 in favour of dark blue. However, the extremely large number of colours appearing on collars, cuffs, and shoulder straps to distinguish the various regiments were retained. There were for example ten shades of red, ranging from cherry red to pink. The Swedish Army had favoured dark blue with yellow facings since the beginning of the 18th century. There was infinite variety, even within smaller armies, between regiments, branches or ranks and the subject is a complex one.

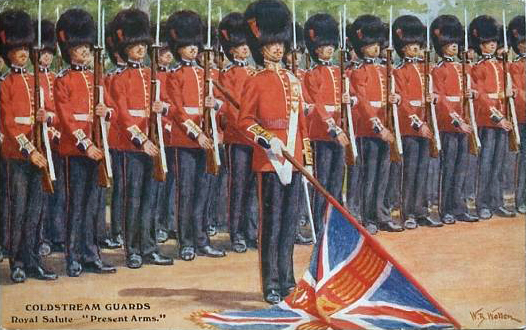
Coldstream Guards on parade in their scarlet dress uniform. By the 20th century most militaries had relegated their more colourful uniforms for ceremonial use only.

The British were the first to introduce drab/khaki uniforms: in 1848 in India. This khaki drill then became more generally worn from the Indian Rebellion of 1857 both in India and Africa. A darker version, known as "service drab", was adopted for home service field wear in 1902, the same year that the US Army also adopted khaki for non-dress occasions. The Italians introduced grey-green in 1909, followed by the German and Austrian armies who adopted different shades of grey. The Russians had changed to a grey shade of khaki in 1908, following their experience in the Russo-Japanese War of 1905. There was however strong attachment to the colourful uniforms as previously worn on all occasions and the process was not an inexorable one. The Danish Army adopted grey-green uniforms for all occasions in 1903, reverted to a combination of dark and light blue in 1910, took up light grey in 1915 and finally settled for khaki in 1923. The Imperial Russian armies, following their adoption of khaki-grey field uniforms in 1908, took the opportunity to upgrade their parade uniforms to much more elaborate and colorful styles, and were experimenting with a mix of khaki and bright colours when war broke out in 1914. The Japanese Army probably went further than most in adopting khaki for all occasions after 1905, although even here officers of all branches and the cavalry of the Imperial Guard retained traditional coloured uniforms for formal and ceremonial occasions.

With the exception of Western-influenced units such as the "Ever-Triumphant Army" of the Taiping Rebellion (1851–66), Chinese armies of the 19th century wore dress that was broadly variegated. Embroidered chest panels and coloured buttons on headdresses were used to distinguish rank and sometimes unit. From 1910 the Imperial Chinese Army adopted dark blue uniforms of Japanese style with coloured facings of red, white, or yellow to distinguish the different branches. The Imperial Guard Division had a light grey uniform with the same branch colours as the line. A khaki summer uniform was worn by the entire army.

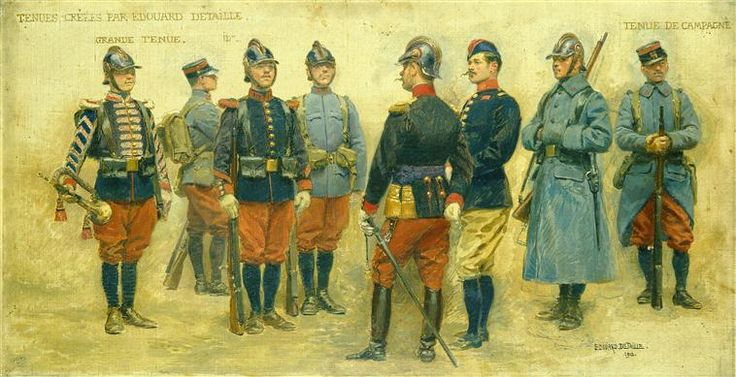
Test uniforms created in 1912 by Edouard Detaille for the French infantry in order to lessen the visibility of the troops on the battlefield as can be seen on the campaign dresses (right).

By the 20th century, drab colours were increasingly being adopted for active service and ordinary duty wear. The First World War finally put an end to the expensive practice of furnishing colourful uniforms to all ranks of the various armies. Amongst the frontline troops in August 1914 only the Belgian and French armies saw active service in bright colours and old fashioned headgear (although the Austro-Hungarian cavalry retained their blue and red uniforms for field wear after the remainder of the army had gone into pike grey in 1909). The Imperial German field grey of 1910 retained a number of traditional features such as spiked helmets, shakos, busbies, and coloured piping from the older uniforms. The demands of modern warfare as well as financial economy soon saw these survivals vanish, and by 1916 all involved armies were in either khaki (Russia, Turkish, Serbia, Montenegro, Japan, Greek, French colonial, and Britain), various shades of grey (German, Italian, Bulgarian, Portuguese, and Austro-Hungarian) or sky blue (French and Romanian). The coloured uniforms of peacetime were often relegated to depot wear by recruits doing their basic training.

Steel helmets first appeared in the form of the "Adrian" helmet adopted by the French Army in 1915. The practical advantages of this innovation led the British and German armies to adopt their own helmets by 1916. Other armies followed suit – the Belgians and Italians for example copying the French model and the Austro-Hungarians that of Germany.

===== Interwar period =====
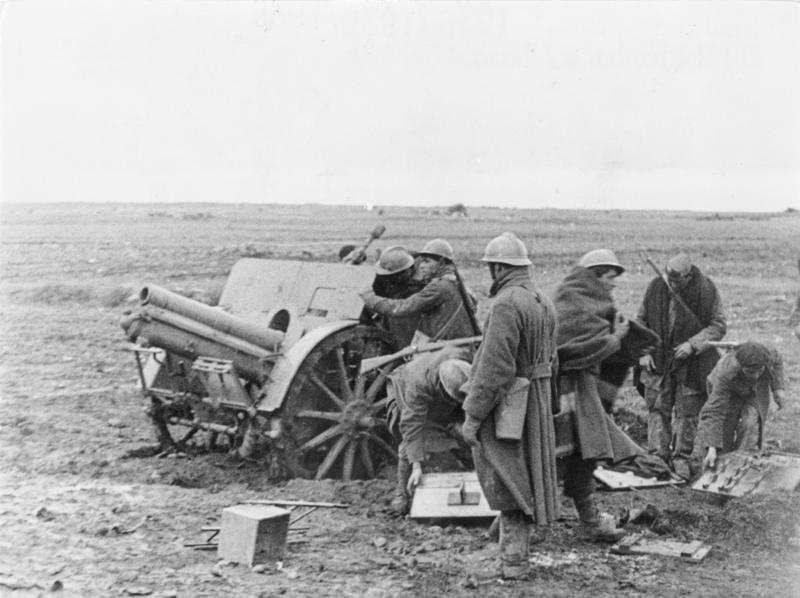
Italian troops wearing steel helmets during the Spanish Civil War

The drab uniforms of 1914–18 remained in general use until the Second World War. This was partly for political reasons, since the republican, fascist, Nazi, and communist regimes that replaced many of the old monarchies and empires had little interest in preserving the splendours of their predecessors. However, even in those societies where there was social and political continuity the trend was away from the traditional uniforms worn prior to 1914. The British Army reintroduced full dress for Guards regiments in 1919-20 and regimental bands by 1928, while permitting officers to wear their mess (evening), blue or green "patrols" (semi-formal) and full dress on appropriate occasions. The French reintroduced "grande tenue" in 1927 for North African regiments which were mostly dependent on voluntary recruiting, and after 1930 required all regular officers to acquire dress uniforms in the pre-1914 colours of their branch or regiment. Elsewhere full or coloured dress of traditional cut was generally restricted to formal uniforms for officers and long service regulars, ceremonial guards, and a few other limited categories. The Spanish Army (which had not been involved in the First World War) exceptionally continued to issue coloured uniforms to all its conscript rank and file until 1926 and thereafter to the garrisons of Seville, Barcelona, and Madrid for special ceremonials until 1931. These included red trousers for the line infantry, following the French practice in an example of cross-border influence.

The use of steel helmets was by now almost universal and a number of countries adopted their own designs moving away from the German, British, and French models of the First World War. The Italians, Soviets, Japanese, Swiss, Spanish and Portuguese were amongst these. Steel helmets, originally simply items of utilitarian protective clothing, were adopted as parade headdress by the French, German, Italian, and Soviet armies, amongst others, between the Wars.

===== Second World War =====
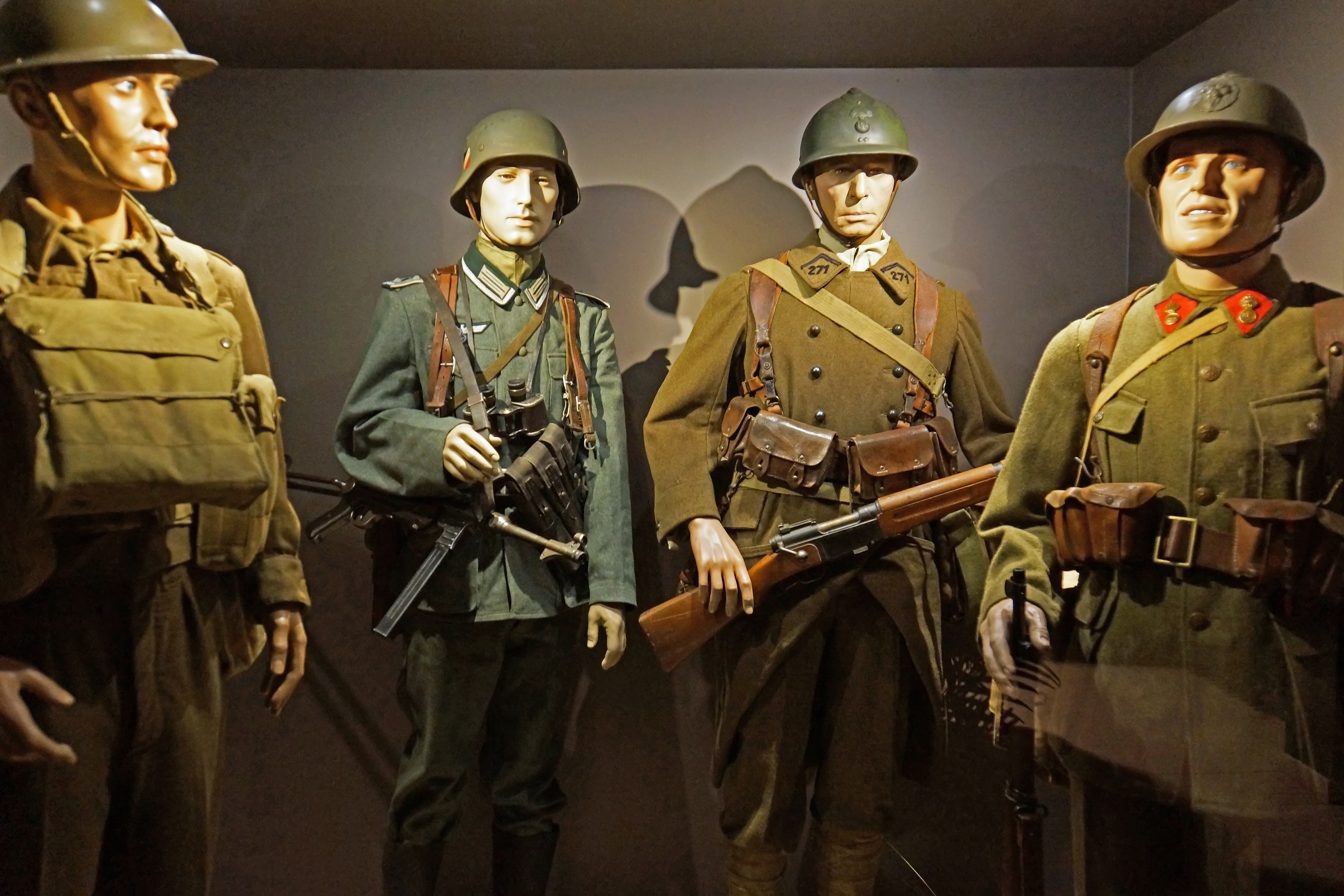
Operational uniforms used by the Belgian, British, French and German forces during the Second World War

Uniforms of varying shades of khaki and grey were universal in the Second World War but the cut and outline appearance of the different armies still made identification in the field relatively straight forward. A Soviet soldier would, for example be distinguishable from his German opponent by his general outline, even in the fog of battle. British, American, Japanese and French uniforms still retained some distinctive features, even as they became more and more utilitarian in the course of the War.

The US Army discarded its First World War style field uniforms in 1941 in favour of a very plain and practical combat dress in a thin light brown wool shirt (sometimes with an olive green cast) and slightly darker trousers. This was worn in conjunction with a smart olive drab "Class A" dress uniform—which in many cases varied to a rich "chocolate" brown tunic worn with khaki trousers. There was a khaki version of the Class A dress uniform for summer wear. The war started with American combat troops wearing combat shoes with "spats" (a form of gaiters), replaced later in the war with 2-buckle combat boots.

By contrast, British soldiers, other than officers, had their 1938 battledress for all occasions.

In Germany the Nazi regime retained uniforms with many traditional features from Imperial Germany for its army uniforms, such as field grey cloth, marching boots (a taller version for officers), collar litzen (braiding) and breeches (for officers and NCOs); German Panzer (tank) troops had a special combat uniform made of black wool and German troops serving in tropical climates had uniforms in a shade of khaki. Later in the war, severe leather shortages led to the replacement of marching boots with ankle height shoes worn with gaiters (Gemäsch).

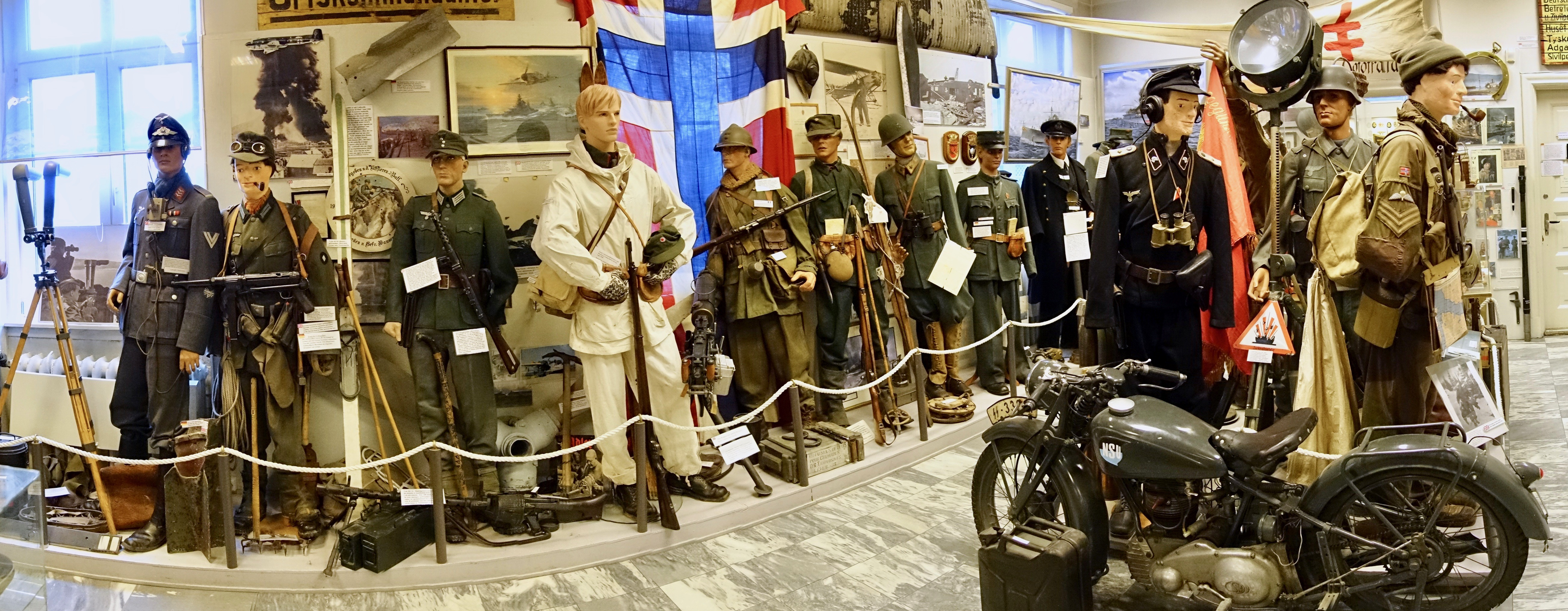
Uniforms and military equipment of German, Norwegian, French and British armies, dating to the Second World War

Imperial Japan used a light brown or khaki colour for most Imperial army uniforms — though there was also a green service dress tunic for officers. Footwear was reddish brown jack boots (restricted for wear only by officers), while soldiers wore shoes with leg wrappings puttees).

From 1935 to 1943, Soviet Army uniforms for all troops (except than tank troops) were an intermediate shade of brown; uniforms included a field uniform ("gymnasterka" shirt with collar tabs and a 2-button breast opening, belt, breeches, garrison cap, and boots), a service dress "kittel" tunic worn with breeches or trousers, and a dress uniform "mundir" tunic (worn with deep blue breeches). Soviet tank troops wore the gymnastyrka shirt, kittel (dress tunic) in a bluish grey (rather than brown) colour. In 1943, the Soviet Army began to re-adopt many Tsarist Army features, notably braided shoulder boards, which had previously been forbidden (since the founding of the Soviet Army) as a sign of an undesirable "social class" mentality. The reintroduction of these epaulettes in 1943 was a relatively inexpensive means of boosting Soviet troop morale. Once reintroduced to the Soviet Army, the use of shoulder boards was never rescinded and they remained part of the uniform until the dissolution of the Soviet Union. The distinct bluish grey colour for tankers was eliminated in 1943, from which point on all units of the Soviet Army wore brown.

== Modern uniforms ==
Most military forces have developed several different uniform types, including combat dress, working dress, service or ordinary duty uniforms and (to a very limited extent) ceremonial full dress.

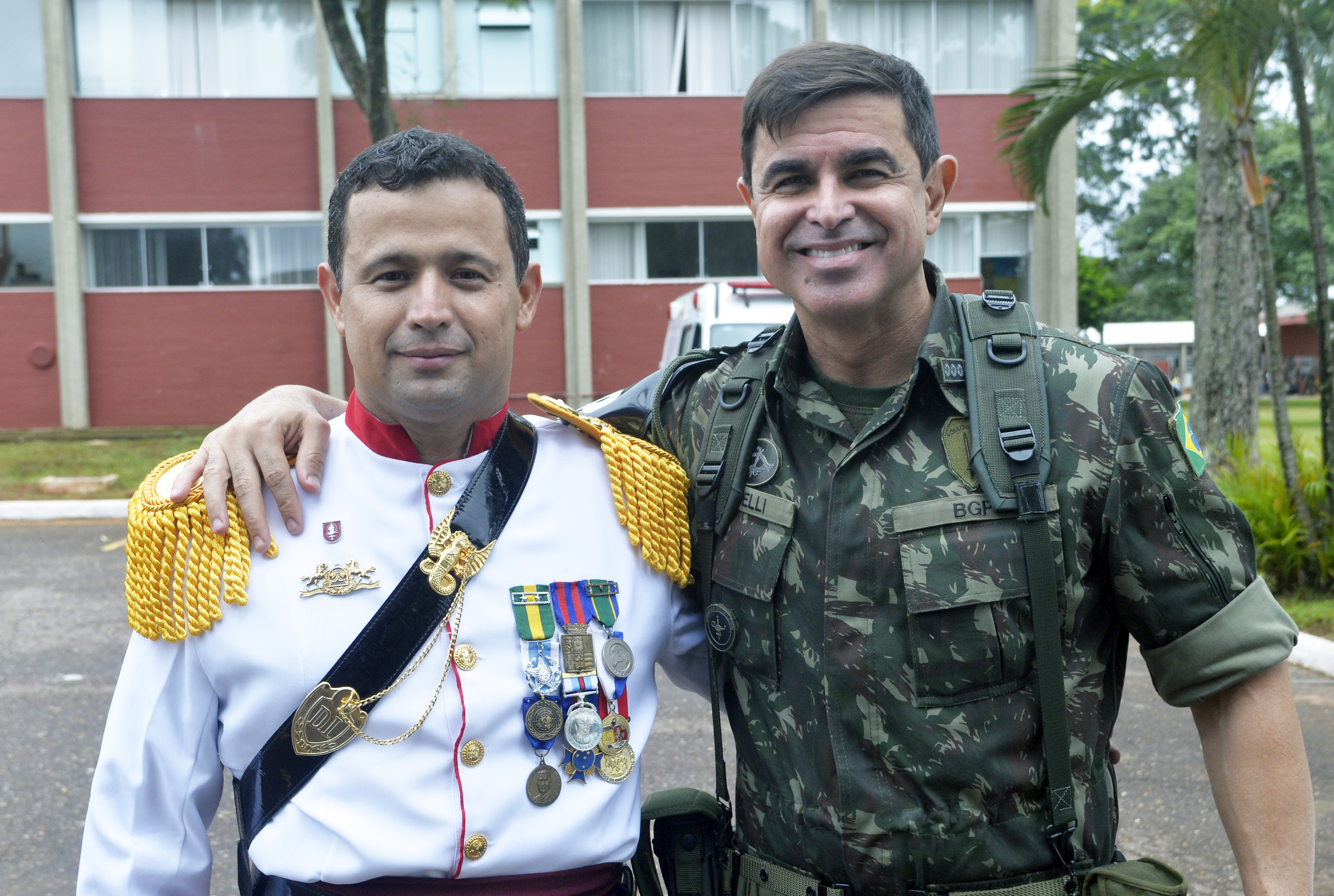
Members of the Brazilian Army's Independence Dragoons. The soldier on the left is wearing the unit's ceremonial uniform, while the other is wearing combat fatigues.

=== Camouflage ===
Today, all armies wear some form of camouflage uniforms for training and combat duty purposes. Armies facing service in different theatres may need several different camouflage uniforms.

=== Parade ===
Traditional coloured uniforms have long since given way to clothing more suited for actual combat in modern conditions. Bright colours are now usually reserved for wear by units having ceremonial functions, some bands and officers attending formal occasions. Elite units normally contrive to having some distinctive features. The United States Marine Corps are well known for their traditional midnight blue tunics and sky blue trousers (trimmed in red for NCO and above). These "dress blues" are worn for formal occasions such as the Marine Corps Birthday Ball in November. The British Household Cavalry and Foot Guards wear uniforms largely unchanged from 1914 for "public duties" i.e. ceremonial.

The military of many countries have adopted the economical expedient of smartening up combat uniforms for parade by adding medals, neck scarves and coloured berets to the terrain coloured camouflage uniforms intended for combat. As an interesting example of the combining of old and new features of uniform the French Spahis and the Spanish Regulares still wear the flowing cloaks, fezzes, turbans and sashes of the North African colonial regiments from which they are descended with modern khaki or camouflage clothing, on appropriate occasions.

=== By country ===
==== France ====
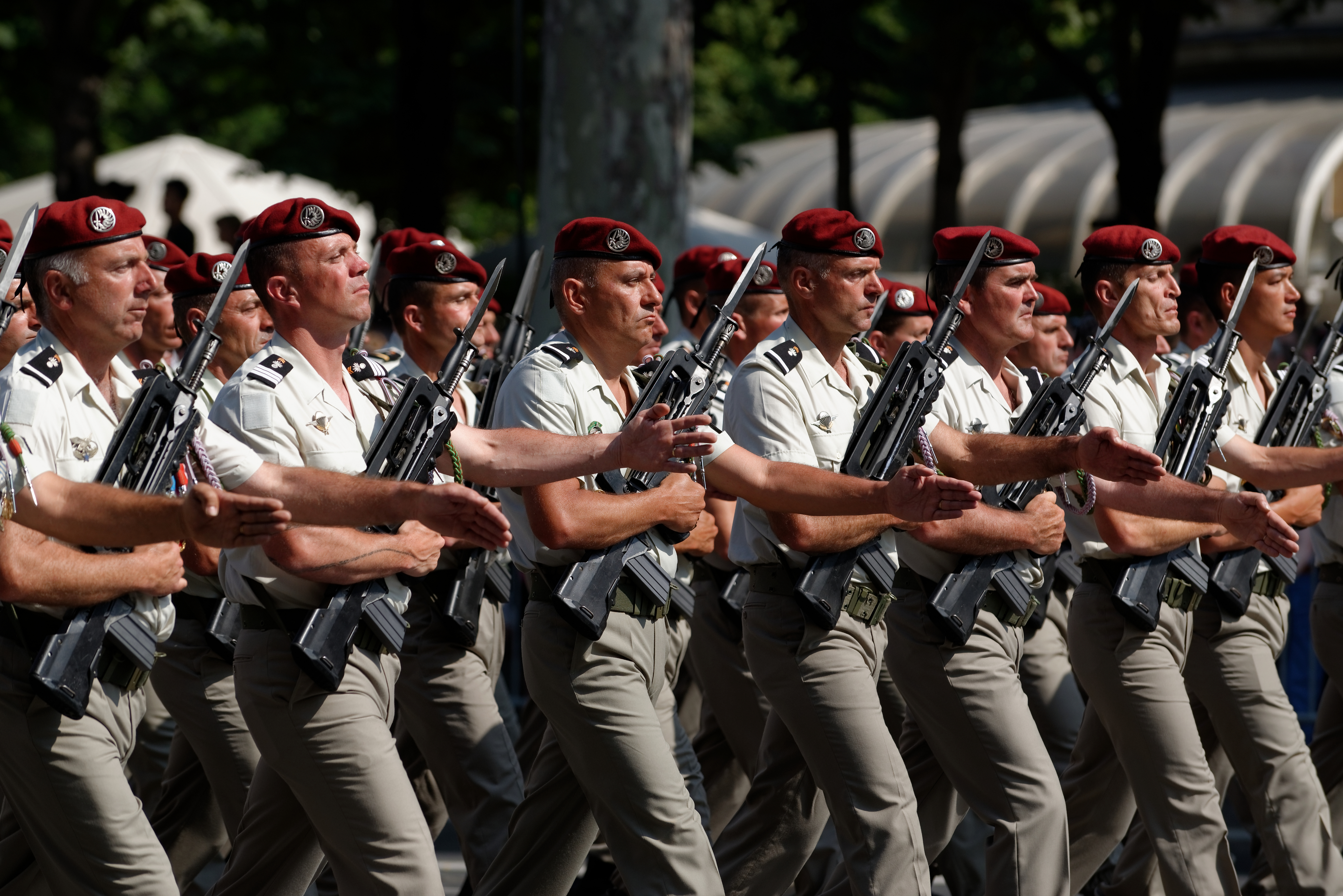
Members of the French Army in parade dress

The battle dress of the French Armed Forces is the FÉLIN system combined with SPECTRA helmets. France has adopted a light beige dress uniform which is worn with coloured kepis, sashes, fringed epaulettes, fourragères and other traditional items on appropriate occasions. As an alternative parade dress, camouflage uniforms can be worn with the dress items noted above. The legionnaires of the Foreign Legion wear white kepis, blue sashes and green and red epaulettes as dress uniform, while the sappers wear the basic legionnaire uniform but with leather aprons and gloves. Troupes de marine wear blue and red kepis and yellow epaulettes. The Chasseurs Alpins wear a large beret, known as the "tarte" (the pie), and mountain outfits. The single remaining regiment of Spahis retains the white cloak and red sash of the days when this corps consisted of Algerian and Moroccan cavalry.

Sailors of the French Navy and Fusiliers marins wear a dress uniform dating from the 19th century with a distinctive red pompon on the round cap.

The infantry and cavalry of the Republican Guard retain their late 19th-century dress uniforms, as do the military cadets of Saint-Cyr and the École polytechnique. A dark blue/black evening dress is authorized for officers and individual branches or regiments may parade bands or "fanfares" in historic dress dating as far back as the Napoleonic period.

==== Germany ====
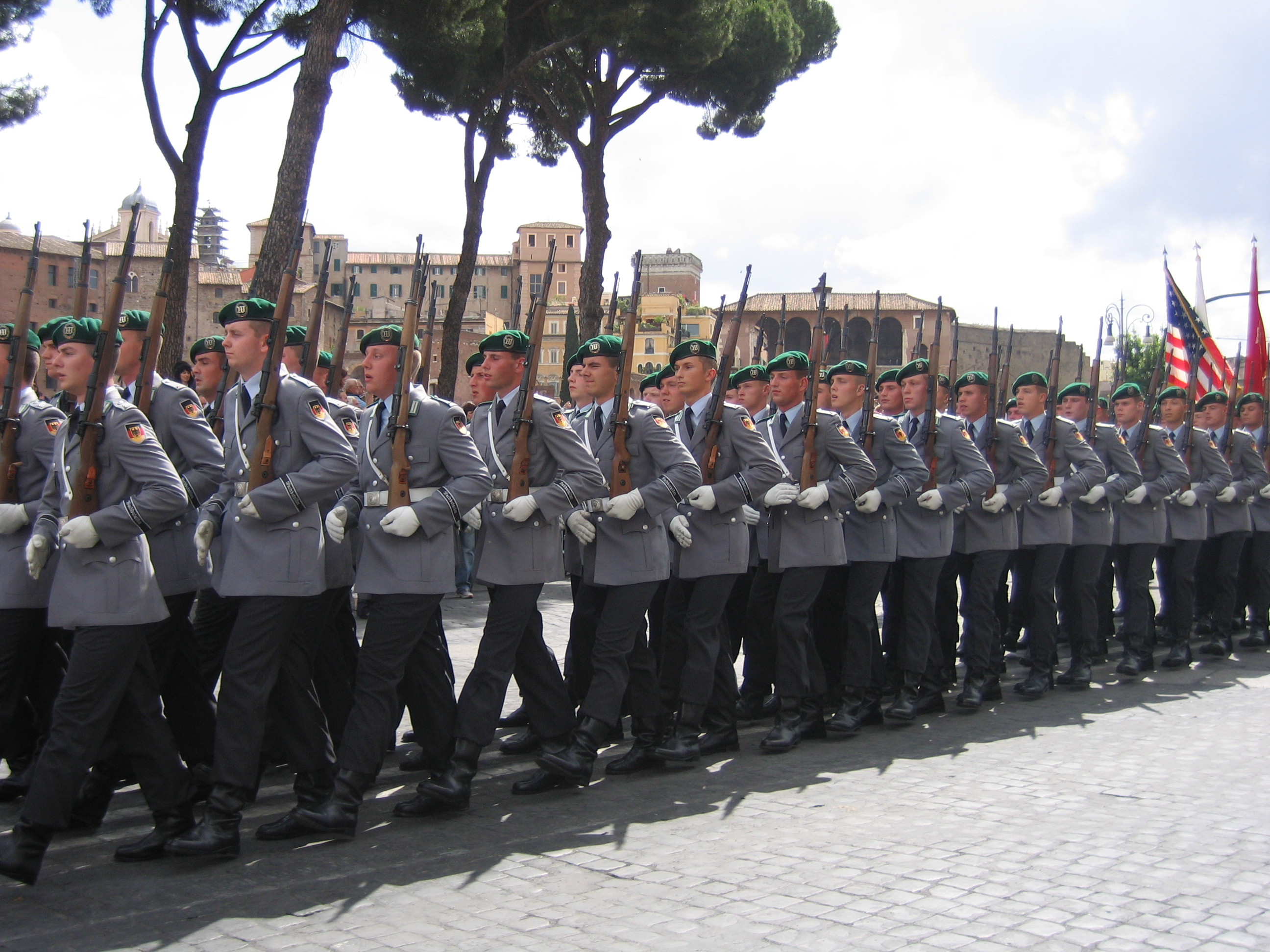
Field grey has been retained in the dress uniforms of the German Army

The German Army has retained a form of field grey for dress wear though of modern cut and worn with berets. Some senior officers still wear peaked caps. The collar braid stripes (Litzen), that distinguished regiments of the Prussian Guard prior to 1918, have become a general feature of modern German uniforms. The Mountain infantry troops retain a more traditional dress uniform. The Nationale Volksarmee of the former German Democratic Republic also maintained a stone grey uniform, following the Imperial German tradition. Both the West and East German militaries still retained Prussian-style dress uniform respectively, with the West abandoning the "Stiefelhosen" (bootcut trousers). Until 1945 Waffenrock (English: service coat or tunic) – was the generic term for military uniform. This included dress uniforms, parade uniforms, and also epaulettes or shoulder boards with rank insignia, as well as uniform cuffs, badges and other insignia.

==== India ====
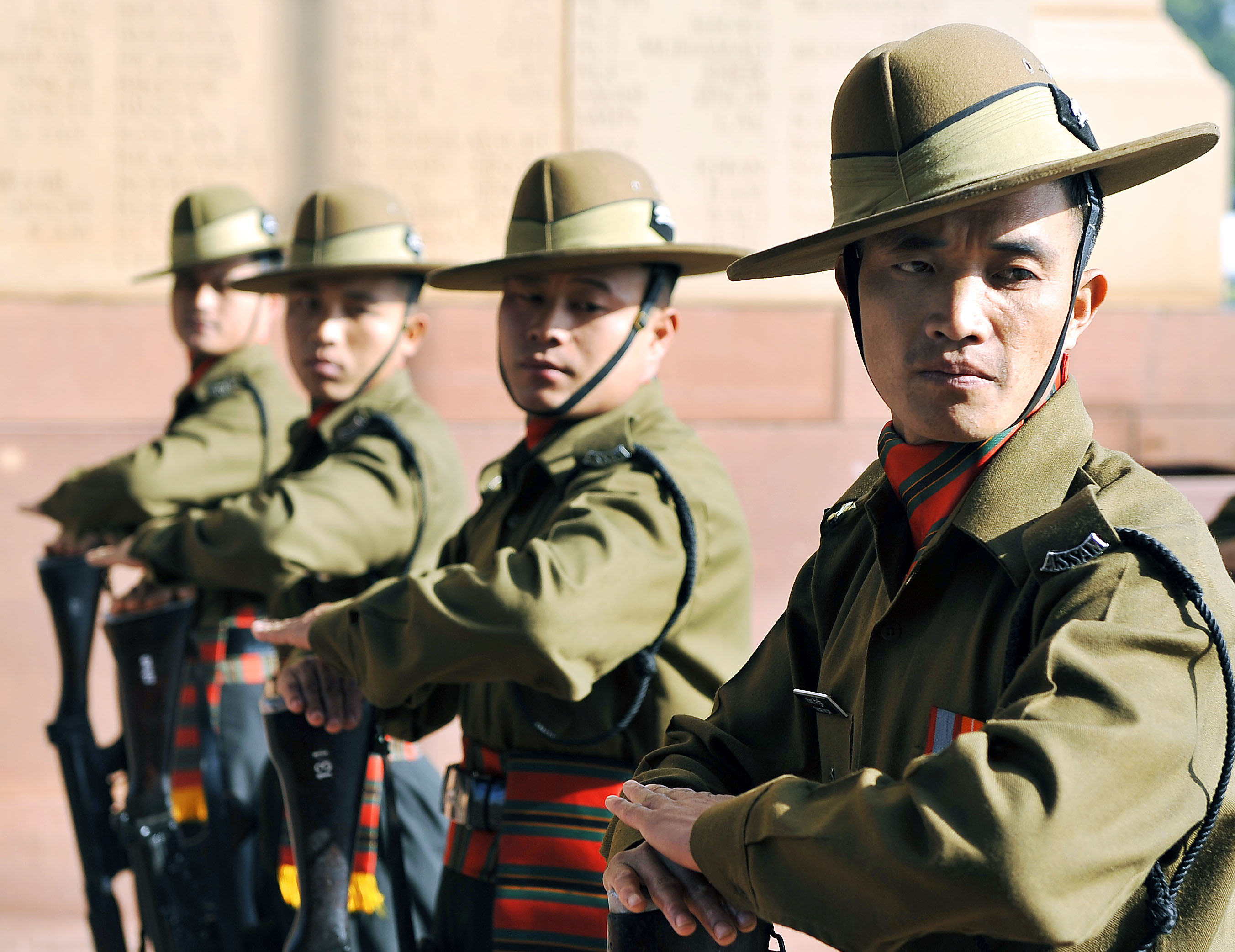
Soldiers of the Assam Regiment of the Indian Army in parade dress

During the Indian Rebellion of 1857 the forces of the East India Company in India dyed their white summer tunics to neutral tones; initially a tan called khaki (from the Hindi word for "dusty"). This was a temporary measure which became standard in the Indian service in the 1880s. Only during the Second Boer War in 1902, did the entire British Army standardise on dun for Service Dress including the British Indian Army. The modern Indian Army uniform standardises on dun for khaki.

The Indian Army camouflage uniform consists of shirts, trousers, and cap of a synthetic material. Shirts are buttoned up with two chest pockets with buttoned flaps. Trousers have two pockets, two thigh box pockets, and a back pocket. The Indian Army Jungle camouflage dress features a jungle camouflage pattern and is designed for use in woodland environments. The Indian Army Desert camouflage, which features a desert camouflage pattern, is used by artillery and infantry posted in dusty, semi-desert, and desert areas of Rajasthan and its vicinity.

Parade dress for the modern Indian Army normally involve the addition of pagris (turbans), cravats and cummerbunds in regimental colours to olive green uniforms. Gurkha, Kumaoni, Naga, Garhwali and Assam units wear wide brimmed felt hats.

==== Indonesia ====
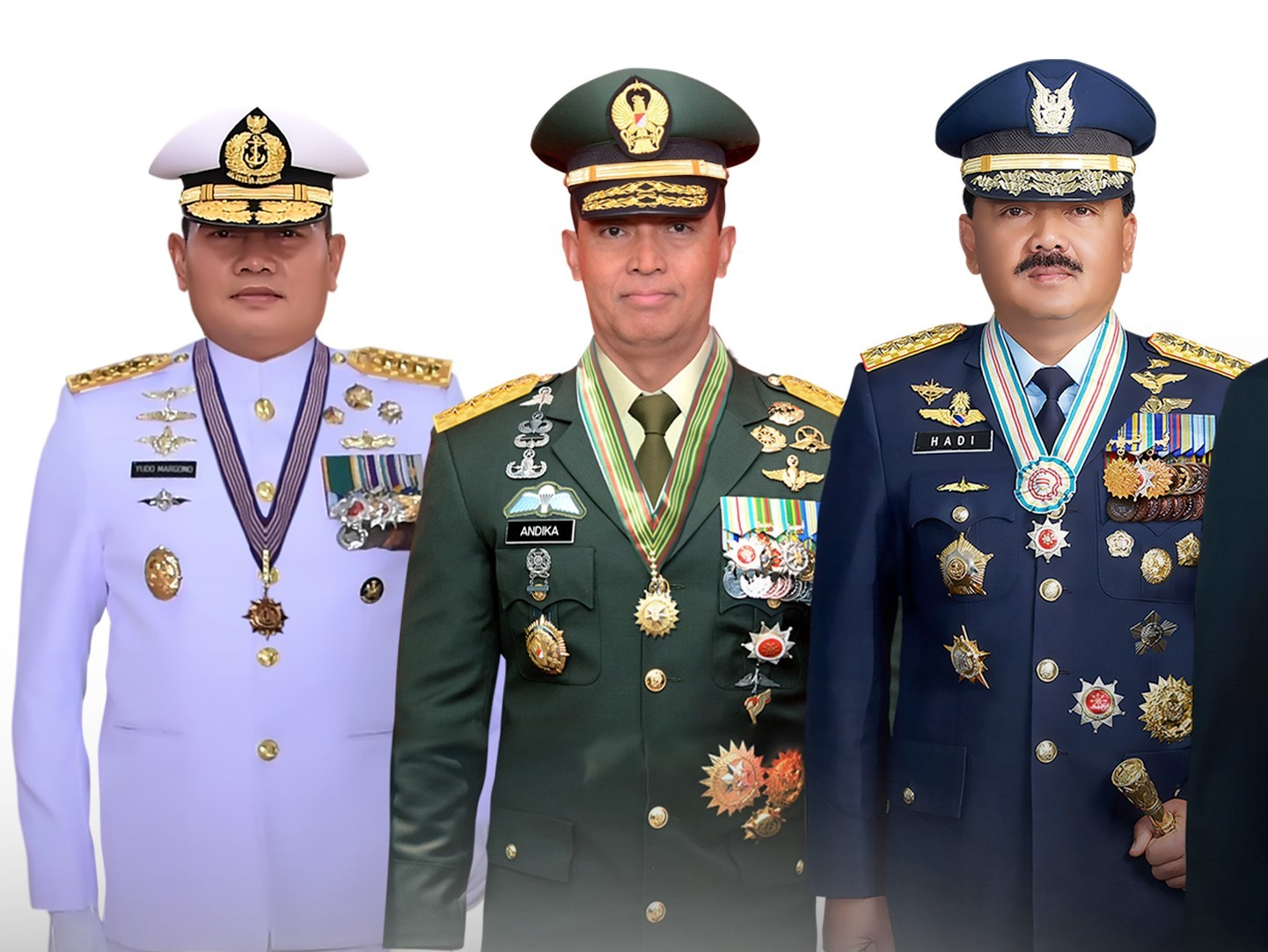
Indonesian flag-officers in their Full dress uniform

The Indonesian National Armed Forces have different types of uniforms worn by its personnel for certain occasions. The uniforms are basically regulated into several categories including "PDU" (Pakaian Dinas Upacara), which is the full dress uniform worn for attending formal state occasions; "PDH" (Pakaian Dinas Harian), which is the service dress uniform worn during everyday-indoor duties; "PDL" (Pakaian Dinas Lapangan), which is the combat dress uniform worn during outdoor duties; and "PDP" (Pakaian Dinas Parade), which is the parade dress uniform worn during military parades and other ceremonial occasions. Each uniform category consists of different types which usually consists of type I until type IV (four types). The uniform regulations are basically different for men and women. The Army, Navy, and Air Force basically have the same regulations for the uniform, but differ in terms of color and certain designs which represent their respective branches.

==== Italy ====
The Italian Armed Forces use a range of different uniforms and uniform variations for each of their four branches: the Italian Army, the Italian Air Force, the Italian Navy and the Carabinieri Corps.

The traditional headdresses of the Bersaglieri, Horse Artillery and Alpini are still worn by the Italian Army, the Bersaglieri even wearing their flowing feathers on steel helmets as part of their combat dress. Officers of all branches have a dark blue dress uniform of modern cut while the Corazzieri (Cuirassiers of the Presidential Guard), Mounted Carabinieri and cadets of the Military Academy of Modena wear ceremonial uniforms which date back to the 19th century. Individual regiments with a long history, such as the Lancieri di Montebello and the Granatieri di Sardegna occasionally parade honour guards or other detachments in their pre-1915 dark blue uniforms.

==== Iran ====
The military of Iran uses a variety of military uniforms, including a solid olive-green pattern. Several other uniforms have also been reserved for parade use, such as a slate grey, a black and white, a beige, a beige on beige, a beige on brown, a beige on green, and an eggshell white-coloured uniform – paired with a matching beret and balaclava.

The Iranian military uses several types of camouflage patterns. Three distinct desert camouflage patterns with slightly differing colour palettes and blotch densities have been issued; one for the Islamic Republic of Iran Army, one for the Islamic Revolutionary Guard Corps, and a third pattern used by the tarabaris personnel who repair military cars and trucks. A green and brown forest camouflage pattern was also issued to the Islamic Republic of Iran Air Defense Force. The Islamic Republic of Iran Air Force was issued an arctic blue camouflage pattern. A pixelated grey and green camouflage pattern was issued to the Islamic Republic of Iran Navy.

==== Russia ====
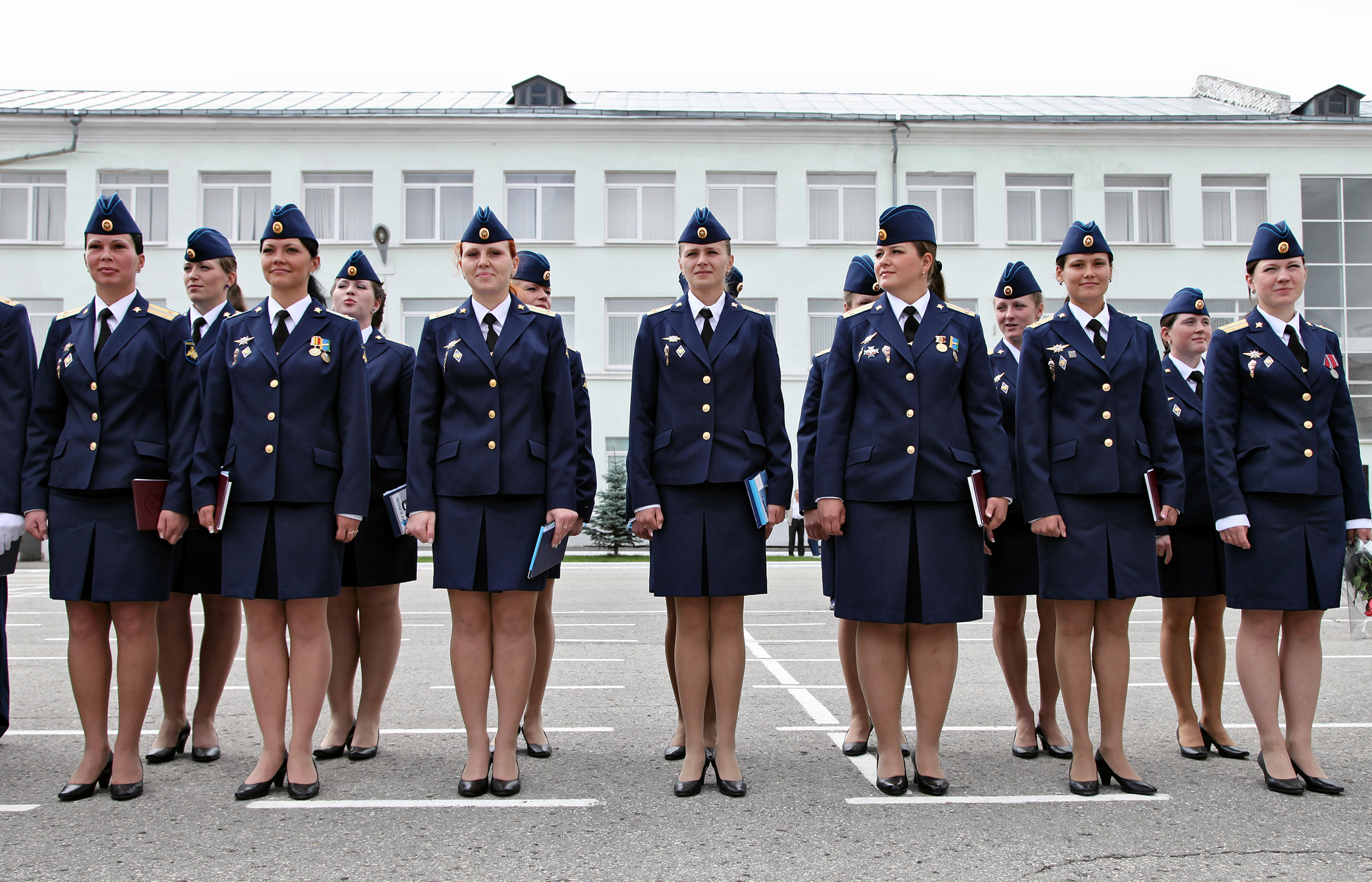
A female contingent from the Russian Armed Forces in their formal uniforms during a parade, 2013.

The Russian Army has retained a number of features, such as officers' epaulettes, high boots and long greatcoats with collar patches for all ranks, which can be traced back to Tsarist days. The dress uniform for officers is of the same distinctive blue/green colour as "Tsar's green", worn until 1914. The Kremlin Regiment has in recent years been issued with a special ceremonial uniform which closely resembles that of the infantry regiments of the Imperial Guard immediately prior to the First World War. Women's uniforms in the Russian Army feature a skirt instead of trousers and a garrison cap instead of a beret or peaked cap. Since 1994 the uniform (or its main details) has undergone a series of changes in 1999, 2005, 2010, 2013 and 2017.

==== Spain ====
The Spanish Army has reintroduced a number of dress uniforms dating back to the pre-1931 Monarchy. These include a variety of parade uniforms worn by various units of the recreated Royal Guard as well as the traditional dark blue and white uniforms of the Guardia Civil and the blue tunics and red trousers of the 1st Infantry Regiment. While only worn by limited numbers of personnel on special occasions, these uniforms include such distinctively Spanish features as the "Ros" shako of the infantry and the Royal Guard, and the Tricorn of the Civil Guard. Officers of all branches wear dark blue or white gala uniforms for social and ceremonial occasions.

==== United Kingdom ====
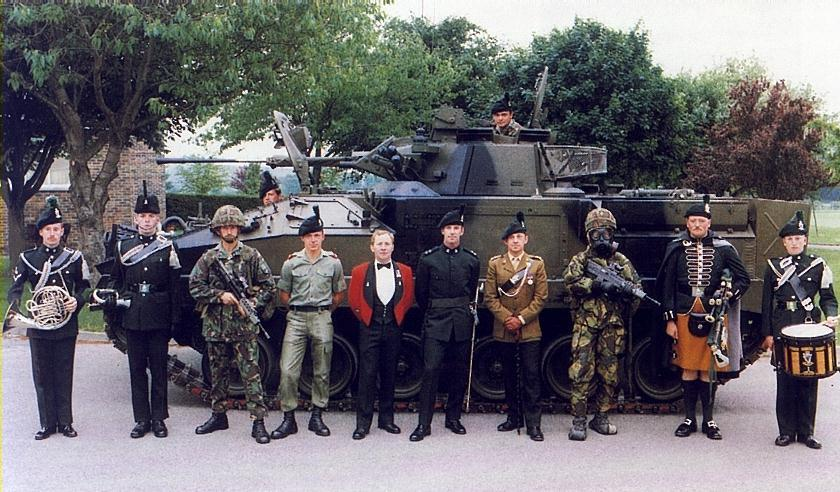
Royal Irish Rangers soldiers and officers in Numbers 8, 14, 10, 1, 2 and 12 dress, flanked by a bandsman, bugler, piper and drummer in full-dress.

The British Army generally retains its traditional full dress uniforms only for bands and units performing ceremonial functions (notably the Household Brigade). An attempt dating from the early 1950s to provide other British soldiers with a plainer (and cheaper) dark blue or green No.1 dress did not meet with much enthusiasm; indeed, most soldiers are not issued with their own No.1 dress, and the most common occasion when it is now worn is for a wedding. Parade dress for most British regiments is khaki No. 2 dress with No 1 Dress coloured peaked caps, berets or Glengarry bonnets. Following the introduction of the Combat Soldier 95 (CS95) clothing system of Disruptive Pattern Material (DPM) and later Multi Terrain Pattern (MTP) this is worn for most day-to-day business replacing the old 'working' uniform of green Lightweight Trousers and Shirt/Jersey, albeit that these are still used as 'Barrack Dress' by some office based personnel. However, the proposed Future Army Dress (FAD), which is currently being developed by the British Army, includes a return to Barrack Dress for all arms, including 'non-iron' shirts and trousers in a similar pattern to that of the current No.2 Dress uniform. Tradition is however still strong in British military culture and there are many regimental distinctions added to some uniforms. One example is the King's Royal Hussars who wear their historic crimson trousers with all orders other than fatigue or combat dress. The "trews" or tartan trousers of Lowland regiments have been retained for certain orders of dress in the amalgamated Royal Regiment of Scotland, although the kilt of the Highland regiments is the parade dress. Mess dress in traditional scarlet, blue or green is worn by officers and senior NCOs of all regiments for formal evening dress.

==== United States ====
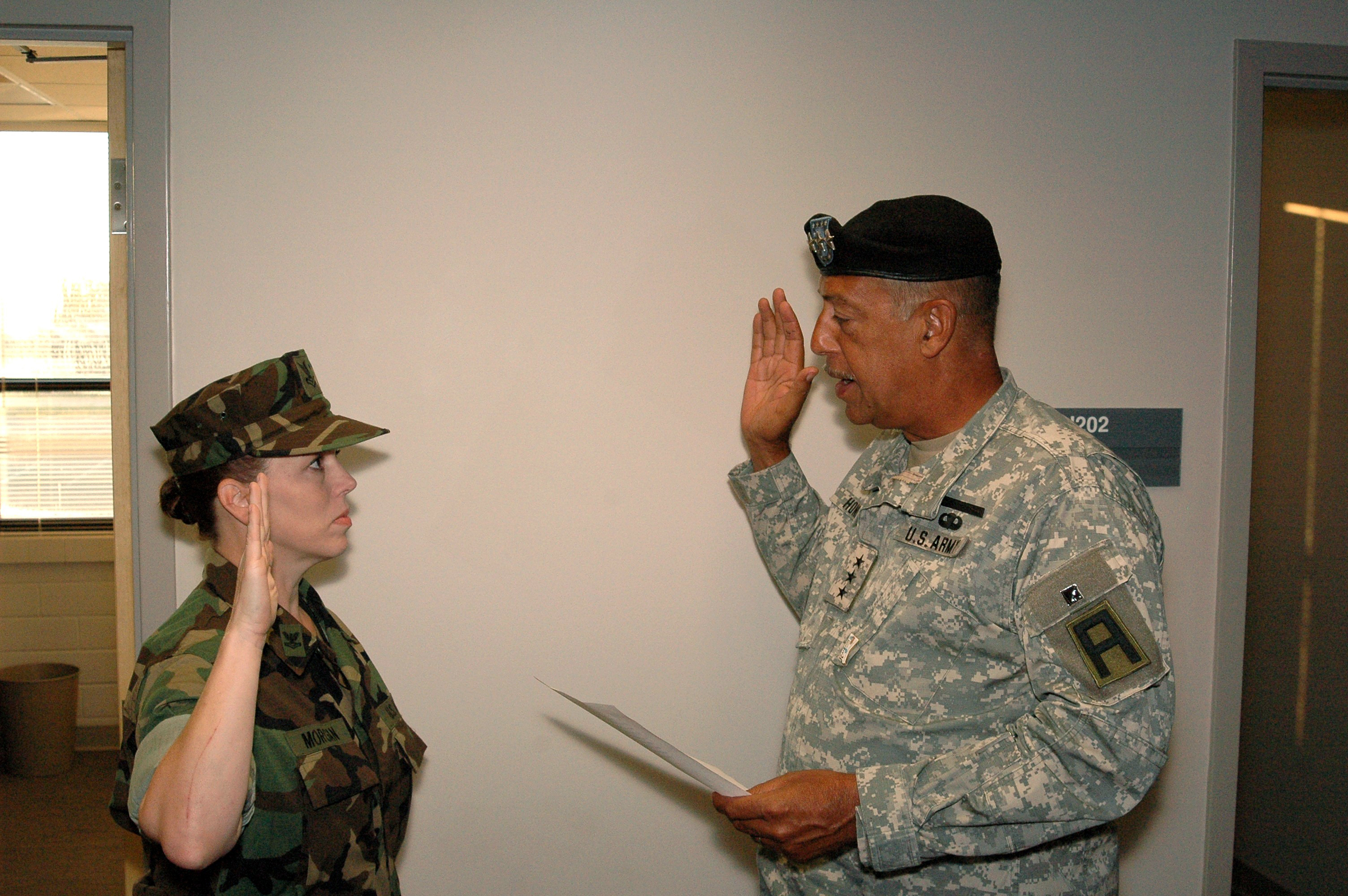
A yeoman dressed in BDU is reenlisted by a United States Army general dressed in ACUs. The ACU replaced the BDU as the army's combat uniform during the 21st century

In recent decades, many militaries around the world have gradually simplified the range of uniforms issued. For example, most U.S. servicemen now wear camouflage utilities for daily duty and all but the most formal occasions-whereas in the past the service uniform would be worn unless a soldier was engaged in a dirty or physical task. As an example of modern practice, the United States Marine Corps has a distinct blue dress uniform, but other uniforms include khaki button-up shirts, forest-green coats, and combat camouflage. In other services where camouflage is normally a non-issue, such as navies, coloured uniforms are still issued, e.g. the United States Navy's white officer uniform for warm weather. The United States Armed Forces allows every branch to develop and use their own uniforms. In recent years, many Battle Dress Uniforms with famous US Woodland pattern were replaced. The marine Corps developed new digital MARPAT pattern, while the United States Army developed Universal Pattern (ACU) for its standard combat uniforms, though a special camouflage pattern (multicam) more appropriate for use in Afghanistan was fielded in 2010. Popular disdain among US troops for the beret headgear as part of the "default" headgear for wear with the ACU uniform led to a regulation revision in 2011, with the standard "default" headgear for wear with ACUs now being the ACU patrol cap, which provides a much better degree of sun protection for the eyes). The U.S. Army has since developed the OCP uniform (starting in 2016), going back to a green camo pattern, with coyote brown undershirts, boots, and belt. The U.S. Army is still in transition between the old ACU pattern and the new OCP pattern. The U.S. Military uses different camo patterns when deployed in different combat zones (in theater). U.S. Army mostly uses the Multi-Cam pattern in Iraq and Afghanistan, but is subject to change due to the new OCP uniform being issued.

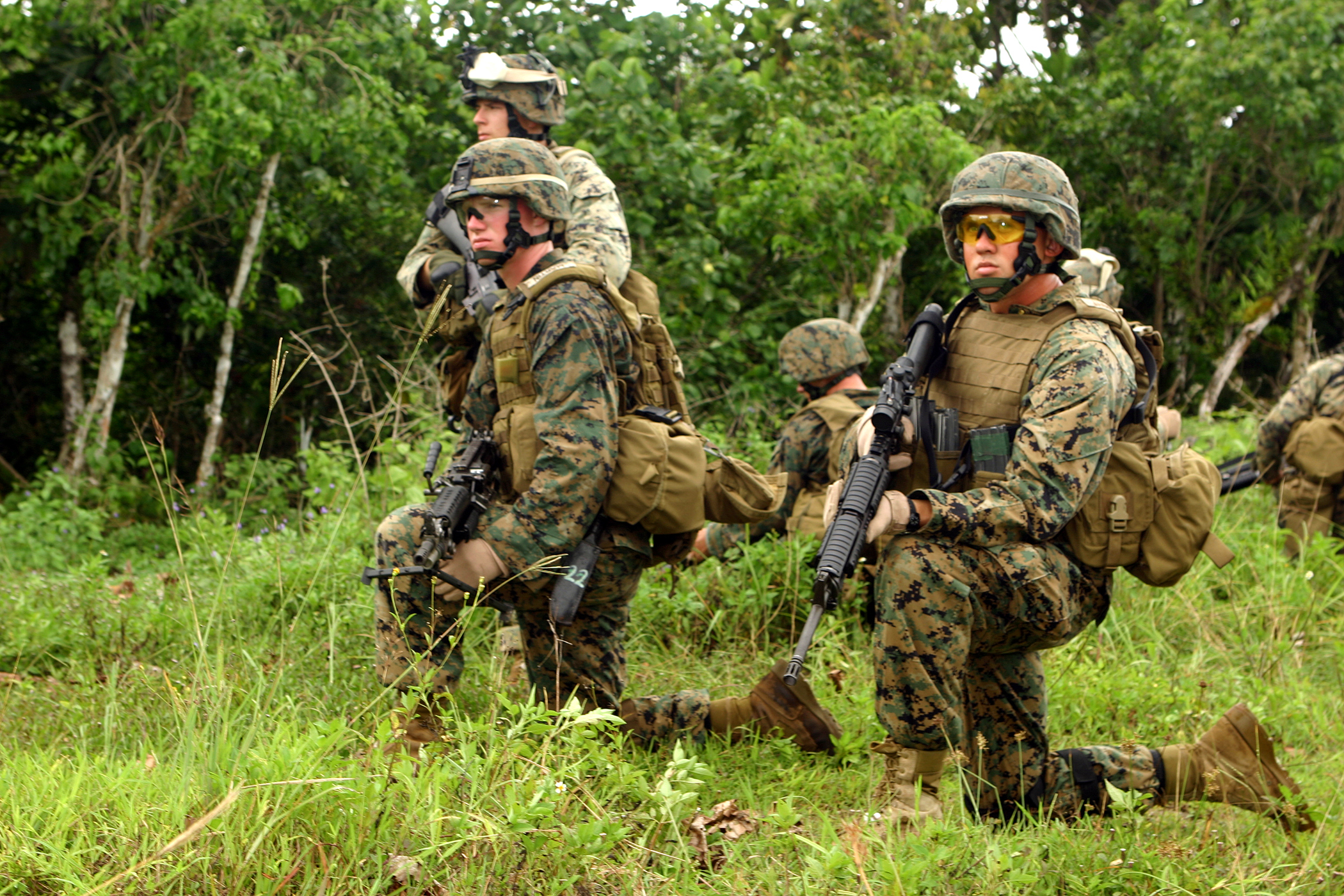
U.S. Marines in MARPAT combat uniforms. The marines was one of several service branches in the U.S. to adopt multi-scale camouflage during the 21st century.

Based on recommendations made during a comprehensive briefing by Task Force Uniform on 24 Feb. 2006, CNO Michael G. Mullen agreed to production of both a BDU-style working uniform for all Sailors E-1 to O-10 and a more practical, year-round service uniform to withstand day-to-day classroom and office-like environments where the service uniform is typically worn. The new Navy Working Uniform (NWU) is now worn by naval sailors and officers. On 6 June 2006 the US Army announced that its green and white uniforms would be superseded by the Army Blue Uniform as a universal service uniform in the historic colours of dark blue (for tunics) and light blue (for trousers). The new service dress was introduced in 2007 and became obligatory for all ranks by 2011.

As of 1 April 2021, the Air Force makes use of the Operational Camouflage Pattern (OCP) as a common daily uniform. This is the same uniform worn by the US Army with the exception of distinctive name patches with copper lettering. The footwear worn with ABUs are coyote brown suede boots and head covering is the OCP pattern Patrol Cap or ball cap, or the beret of the relevant career field (Security Forces, Special Operations Weather Team, SERE Instructor, Pararescue, and Combat Controller). Aside from OCPs, the most common uniform to be worn would be dress blues, which incorporate a light navy blue for bottoms, and the same shade to match the top jacket. Underneath the top jacket either a long sleeve or short sleeve sky blue shirt may be worn with a tie or neck tab whenever wearing the top jacket. The jacket is reserved for more formal events. Placed on the outermost tunic, Airmen may pin their ribbons and career badge as optional with their name plate as the only mandatory item. For headgear a flight cap of matching shade to the pants and similar in appearance to the former Army green garrison cap and the shoes are a black high polished dress shoe. Other, but not standard, headgear includes the flat top mess dress cap and the appropriate beret career field beret. Blues, though the second most used uniform, receive far less service than OCPs. Those performing duties not suited for the formal dress uniform may wear OCPs instead. The Mess Uniform uses the same pants and jacket as dress blues, but with a white under-shirt, bow tie and cummerbund, and the same black dress shoes.

== Purpose ==
=== Distinctive clothing ===
One purpose of military uniforms is to clearly distinguish combatants who are protected by the laws of war from other persons carrying weapons, who do not always enjoy such protection.

Another purpose in historical times was to make it difficult for deserters to avoid detection; military uniforms were so distinctive with many metal buttons and unique colours that they could not be modified into unrecognisable clothing. If the commander raised and equipped the troops out of his own pocket, the appearance of the soldiers was also designed to impress his superiors.

Attractive or distinctive uniforms could make a military career desirable to young men or women (the "peacock" factor). As late as 1914 the British Army found that regiments with particularly striking off-duty or parade uniforms found it easier to attract recruits. Thus the four Rifle regiments in their sombre dark green had a higher public profile than the great mass of line infantry in scarlet.

==== Nationalism ====
During the Boxer Rebellion, the Muslim Gansu Braves under General Dong Fuxiang used traditional Chinese clothing instead of western-style uniforms, reflecting the opposition of the movement to foreign influences.

==== Religion ====
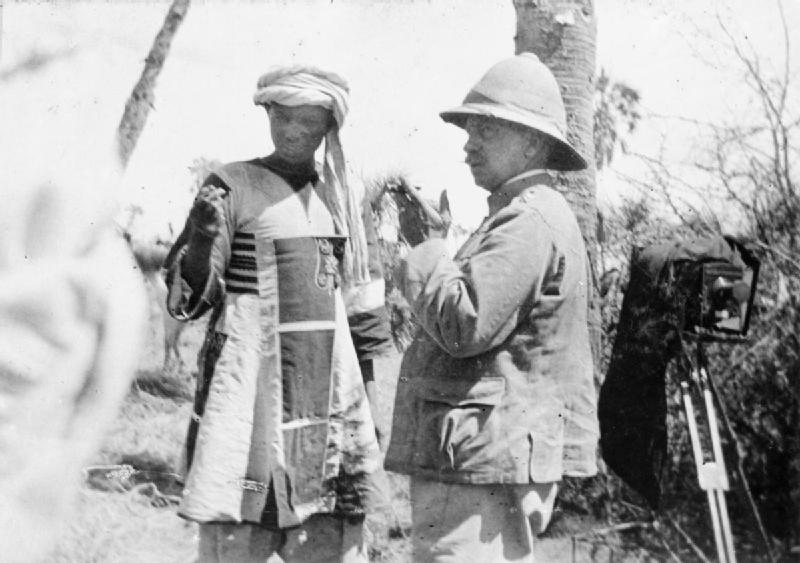
A Sudanese prisoner with Reginald Wingate after the Battle of Atbara. The prisoner is wearing a jibba, a garment that was worn by followers of Muhammad Ahmad.

The patched jibba, a garment traditionally worn by followers of Sufi religious orders, was adopted as military dress in the 1880s by the Sudanese anṣār (Arabic: أنصار) (followers of the religious leader Muhammad Ahmad al-Mahdi). The Anṣār rebelled against the Turkish Ottoman rule of Sudan, due, among other reasons, to the lax religious standards of the occupation. The jibba was a ragged, patched garment which symbolised a rejection of material wealth by its wearer and a commitment to a religious way of life. Muhammad Ahmad al-Mahdi decreed that this garment should be worn by all his soldiers in battle. The decision to adopt the religious garment as military dress, enforced unity and cohesion among his forces, and eliminated traditional visual markers differentiating potentially fractious tribes. During the years of conflict between Mahdist and Anglo-Egyptian forces at the end of the 19th century, the Mahdist military jibba became increasingly stylised and were specifically colour-coded to denote the rank and military division of the wearer.

=== Visibility or camouflage ===
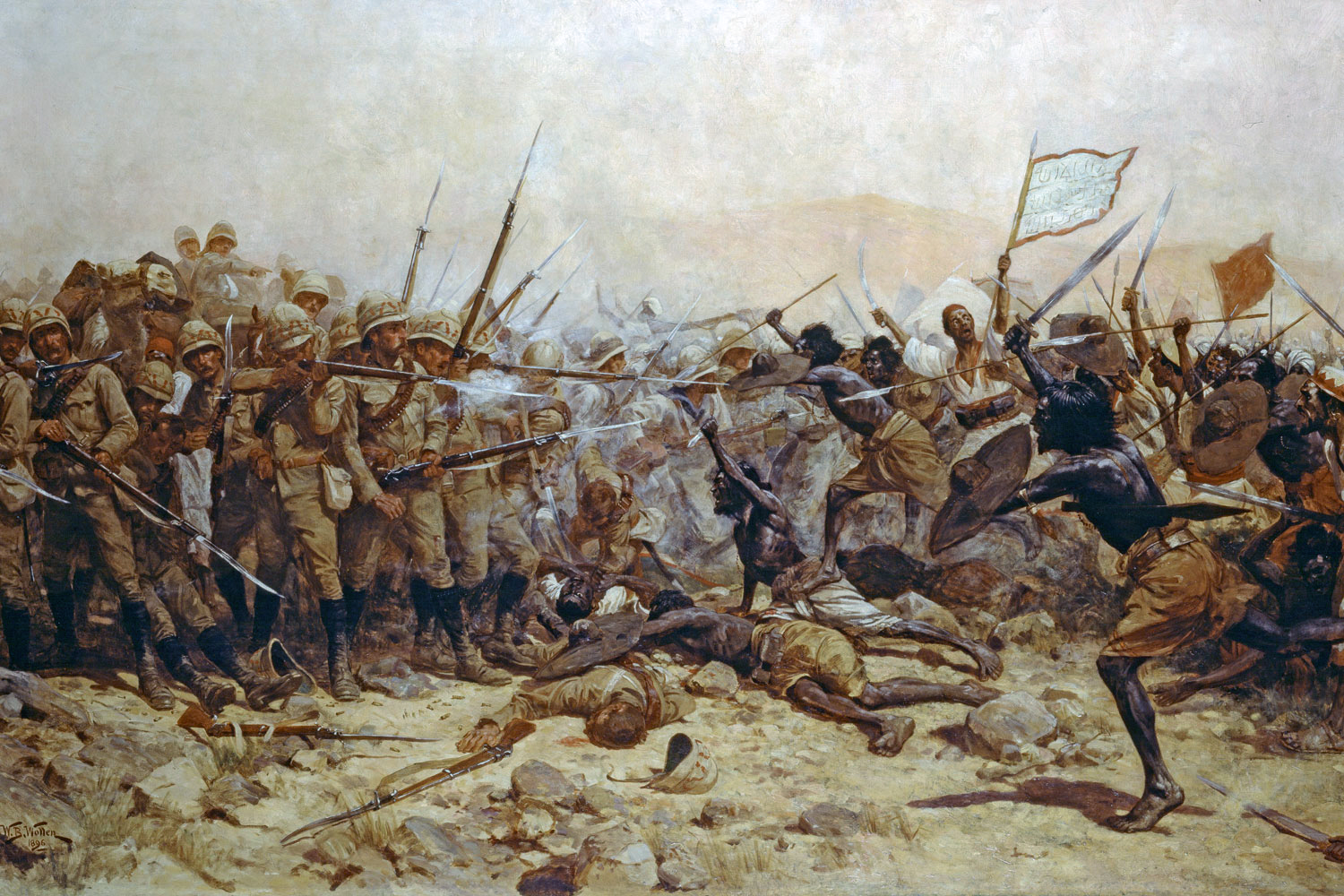
The rise of rifles and smokeless powder led to the decline of more-colourful uniforms in favour of drab.

Throughout the 18th and 19th centuries, the typical colour scheme included bright and highly contrasting colour arrangements which made it easier to distinguish units in battle. Coloured uniforms were useful in enabling commanders to spot troop locations on battlefields that were often completely obscured by smoke from the black gunpowder used in both muskets and cannons. Large flags were another aid to co-ordination and location for commanders.

However, with the growing prevalence of accurate rifles and other ranged firearms as standard weapons for infantry, it was found, from about the 1880s on, that these colours made soldiers easy targets for enemies to shoot at a distance. These weapons used a new smokeless powder that generated far less smoke leaving the battlefield un-obscured by smoke and making brightly coloured troops into highly visible targets. In reaction, the various militaries, beginning with the British Army, changed the colours, predominantly to such ones that blended in more with the terrain, such as khaki, grey or olive drab for the purposes of camouflage. In addition, this idea was followed with uniforms suitable for particular climates and seasons such as white for snowy regions and tan for sandy ones. Now most armies have some form of camouflaged uniform, such as the British Disruptive Pattern Material.

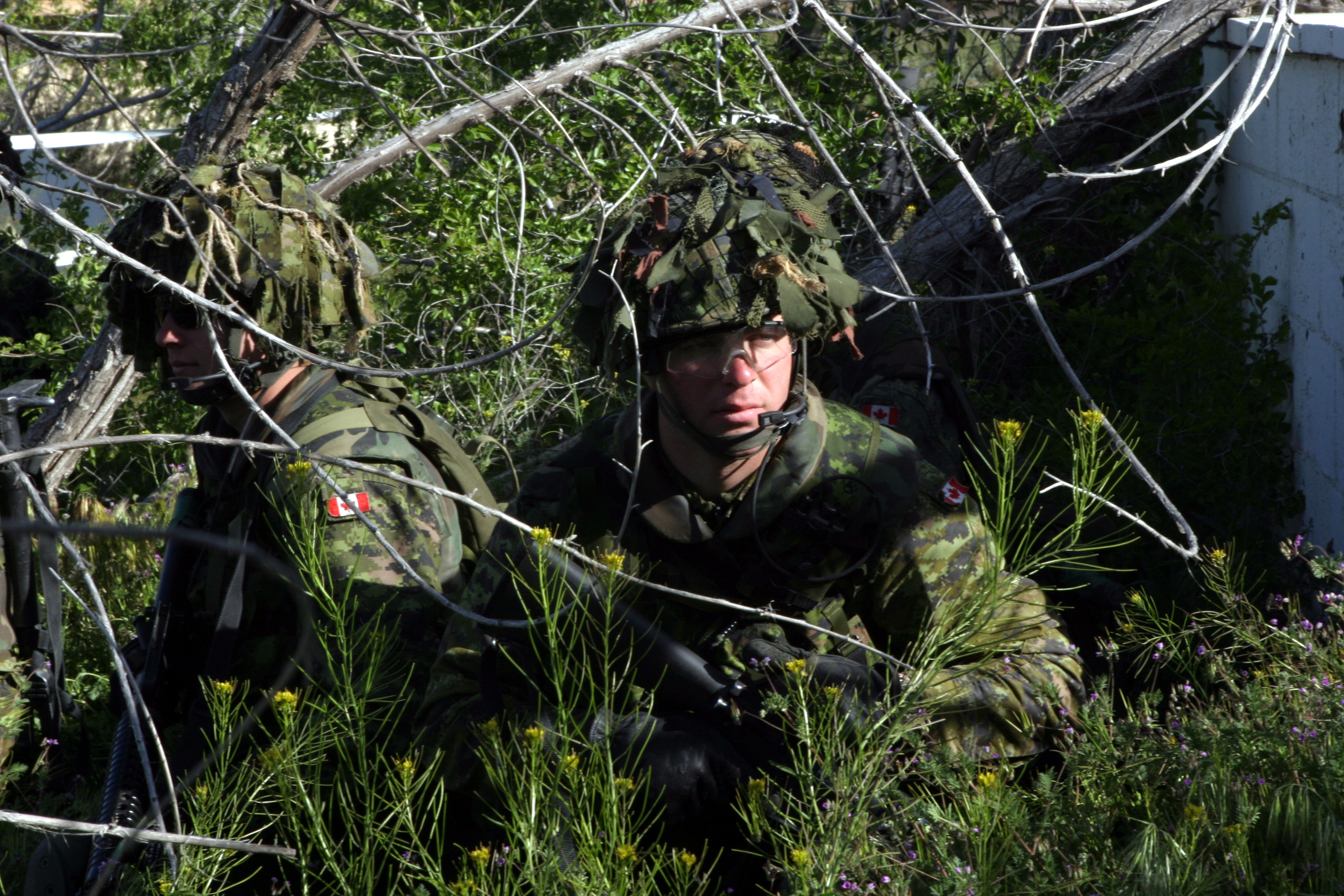
Soldiers of the Canadian Army in CADPAT camouflage uniforms. Camouflaged uniforms are used to make its wearers less visible.

Many modern military forces now use a system of combat uniforms that not only break up the outline of the soldier for use on the battlefield during the daytime, but also employ a distinctive appearance that makes them difficult to detect with light amplification devices, such as night-vision goggles (NVGs). These modern "digital" print uniforms present a somewhat splotched appearance, generally of somewhat muted colours, that provide visual concealment in a variety of surroundings. The US Army now issues, for all theatres of operations, the Army Combat Uniform, which replaces the Battle Dress Uniform and the Desert Combat Uniform. The colour scheme on these ACUs is OCP, or Operational Camouflage Pattern, a derivative of Crye Precision’s Scorpion W2. Pocket outlines on the front of the jackets are offset from vertical, so as to present a less distinctive straight line for the eye to follow while using NVGs. The U.S. Marine Corps also issues similar uniforms with their MARPAT pattern, the U.S. Marines considered adopting CADPAT for their new pattern, however, the Canadian government owns the copyright for the pattern which it had been developing since 1988. The Canadian government supplied information and manufacturers to help the Marines with the development of their own computer-generated digital pattern pixelated uniform. Though their uniforms are not designed to replace both woodland pattern uniforms and desert pattern, since both woodland digital and desert digital patterns are available. Similarly the US Air Force has begun fielding digital pattern uniforms to their service members, with those uniforms featuring a blue/grey/tan pattern).

=== Uniform of the day ===
The "uniform of the day," when referred to in a military sense, is the designated uniform all military personnel are required to wear on that particular day. It is often designated by the senior officer on the base. Normally the uniform is determined by the seasons (e.g. winter blues or summer whites for Navy) however, special occasions (e.g. visiting dignitaries) or weather changes may dictate changes to the uniform of the day. The uniform of the day instruction is broadcast over the 1MC at reveille on board U.S. Navy ships.

The "uniform of the day" may also be referred to as the "dress of the day" in some militaries.

=== Logistics ===
Mass-produced uniforms are a good way to equip thousands of soldiers quickly and efficiently. Uniforms in standard sizes and designs are also easier to replace on campaign. As an example, English levies raised for service in Ireland or the Continent during the 17th century came to be provided with clothing purchased in bulk and often of a standard colour or cut. This was however only a temporary wartime expedient and the development of uniforms as such had to wait on the formulation of a system of permanent regiments, notably by the French Monarchy (see above).

=== Psychological warfare ===
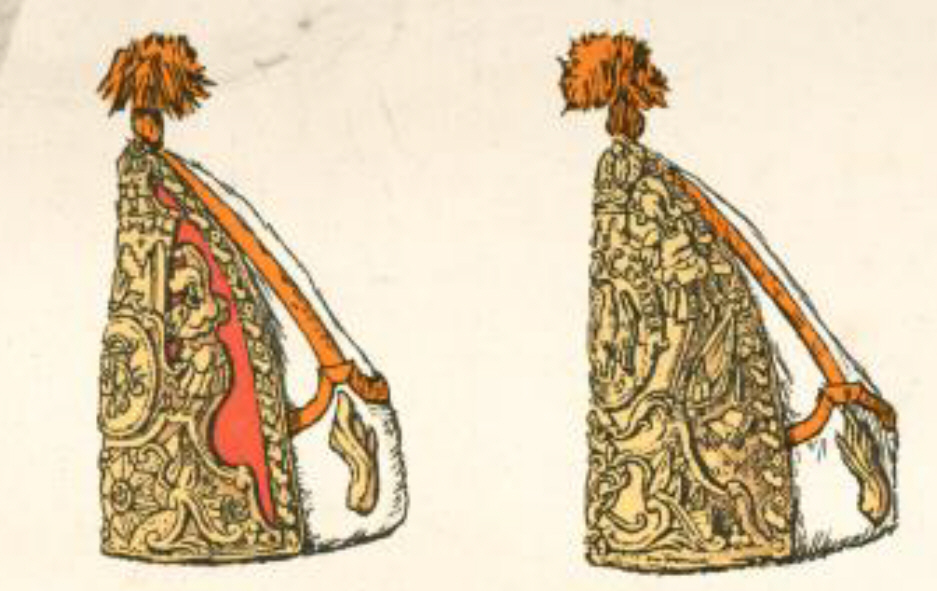
18th century Prussian grenadier mitre caps. Some military units have historically adopted tall headgear as a part of their uniform to exaggerate the wearer's height.

The appearance of the troops was often enhanced in some way to intimidate the enemy. The tall, mitre-shaped caps worn by grenadiers in the 18th century made their wearers appear bigger and more impressive. King Frederick William I of Prussia had a guard unit of especially tall men with tall mitre hats, the Potsdam Giants. Prussian hussars wore the "skull and crossbones" (Totenkopf) on their hats from 1740 to 1918. This tradition continues into the present day with nose art and fin flash on combat aircraft.

The warriors of ancient Sparta, normally known for their austere lifestyle, wore expensive red cloaks. Reportedly this was adopted as the only colour on which the spilled blood of their enemies would not leave stains. There is a popular myth that the historic red coat of the English soldier was adopted for the same reason (in fact, blood does show as a dark stain on red clothing and the British red coat originated as a historical accident, possibly as a result of the relative cheapness of madder red dyes at the time of the English Civil War in the mid-17th century).

Hair styles in military organisations usually follow civilian fashions, but sometimes certain features are associated with soldiers. In the late 19th century, the ornate beards and moustaches worn by the officers of the day, which complemented their rank and age, were also worn by socially equivalent civilians. In the 20th and 21st centuries, the "high and tight" haircut often distinguished low-ranking soldiers, particularly infantrymen, or, in the United States, Marines and Soldiers of all ranks. The principal purpose, however, of the "high and tight" is to prevent lice and promote general hygiene. Modern regulations against beards also ensure a good seal is made around the face when using a gas mask.

== Components of military uniform ==
- Aiguillette
- Badges
- Bearskin
- Beret
- Brassard
- Busby
- Buttons
- Coatee
- Czapka
- Epaulette
- Fez
- Fourragère
- Garrison cap
- Glengarry
- Gorget
- gymnasterka
- Hackle
- Kepi
- Medal
- Peaked cap
- Pickelhaube
- Pith helmet
- Red coat
- Ribbon bar
- Rogatywka
- Sailor cap
- Sam Browne belt
- Sash
- Shako
- Stable belt
- Tunic
- Ushanka
- Sajkaca
- Plis

== See also ==
Military uniform types

- Full dress uniform
- Mess dress uniform
- Service dress uniform
- Combat uniform
- Physical training uniform

Other

- Armour
- Costumes
- Facial hair in the military
- List of camouflage patterns
- Militaria

Uniforms by country

- Egyptian Army Uniform
- Greek Army uniforms
- Modern Irish Army uniform
- Swedish military uniforms
- Tanzanian Armed Forces Uniform
- Uniforms of the Australian Army
- Uniforms of the Canadian Armed Forces
- Uniforms of the Imperial Japanese Army
- Uniforms of Iraqi Armed Forces
- Uniforms of the New Zealand Army
- Uniforms of the Royal Danish Army

== General sources ==
- Bueno, José María (1983), El Ejército de Alfonso XIII - La Infantería de Línea (in Spanish), Madrid: Barreira, p. 26, ISBN 84-86071-02-X.
- Elliott, Jane E. (2002), Some did it for civilisation, some did it for their country: a revised view of the boxer war, Chinese University Press, p. 126, ISBN 962-996-066-4.
- Kannik, Preben (1968), Military Uniforms of the World, London: Blandford P., ISBN 0713704829.
- Lanxin Xiang (2003), The origins of the Boxer War: a multinational study, Psychology Press, p. 207, ISBN 0-7007-1563-0 (scroll down to next page from 206 to get to 208).
- Pfanner, Toni (March 2004), "Military uniforms and the law of war" (PDF), International Review of the Red Cross, 86 (853): 93–124, doi:10.1017/S1560775500180113, S2CID 144589400, archived (PDF) from the original on 13 August 2011.
- Asquith, Stuart (1981), New Model Army 1645-60 (illustrated ed.), Osprey, p. 32, ISBN 9780850453850.
- Wilkinson, Frederic (1970). Battle Dress: a Gallery of Military Style and Ornament. Garden City: Doubleday & Company.
- Graff, David A. (2016). The Eurasian Way of War Military Practice in Seventh-Century China and Byzantium. Taylor & Francis. ISBN 978-1-317-23709-9.
- Damhorst, Mary Lynn; Miller, Kimberly A.; Michelman, Susan O. (1999). The Meanings of dress. Fairchild Publications. ISBN 1-56367-165-4.
