= Military textile science =

Study of textiles used by defense forces

Military textile science is the study and development of technical textiles used by defense forces on land, sea, and air. The products derived from this field of study are designated as military textiles.This field includes various types of textiles, such as woven, knitted, nonwoven, coated, laminated, and composite materials, all designed to meet the specific needs of military operations. The focus is on creating textiles that are lightweight, durable, and effective in providing comfort, protection, and survival in challenging environments.

== History ==
The history of military textile science dates back to the late 18th century, with one of the earliest documented studies attributed to Benjamin Thompson. In 1792, he published a paper on Philosophical Transactions of the Royal Society where he highlighted the importance of internally trapped air in textiles for thermal insulation. Here is a list of some of the most important innovations in military textiles in history:

Year	Innovation	Impact on Military Use
1879	Gabardine	Used in trench coats, offering protection from rain while allowing breathability.
1912	Flame-Resistant textiles	Provided enhanced protection in combat zones, reducing burn injuries.
1933	Polyethylene fiber	Used to achieve flexibility, high ductility, and resistance against chemicals and water.
1939	Nylon Stockings	Demonstrated Nylon's potential, leading to its military adoption.
1941	Nylon Parachutes	Improved reliability and availability of parachutes during World War II.
1943	Ventile Fabric	Enhanced water resistance and survival rates for airmen.
1955	Ballistic Nylon	Provided improved protection against shrapnel and ballistic threats.
Early 1960s	Nomex	Enhanced protection for soldiers exposed to fire and heat.
1963	Dyneema	Provided high strength with lightweight properties, used in body armor and protective gear.
1965	Kevlar	Revolutionized body armor, providing effective ballistic protection.
1969	Gore-Tex	Improved comfort and protection in harsh, wet environments.
Early 1970s	Twaron	Used in bulletproof vests, helmets, and other protective gear.
1974	Aramid Fibers	Improved durability and effectiveness of body armor.
Early 1990s	Smart Textiles	Enabled real-time monitoring of soldier’s health and environmental conditions.

== Material and performance parameters ==
Military textiles are categorized under various functional criteria, which include:

- Thermal and Evaporative Resistance: Measured using the skin model to determine the thermal insulation and evaporative resistance of textiles.
- Water Resistance: Fabrics should have high water vapor permeability or low evaporative resistance to allow sweat evaporation while being water repellent to minimize water pick-up.
- Durability: Textiles should exhibit excellent durability, especially in harsh environments, and maintain their protective qualities after multiple launderings.
- Flame Resistance: Fabrics should be inherently flame-resistant or treated to resist flames, with an emphasis on not melting or dripping when exposed to heat.
- Weight and Bulk: Military uniforms need to be lightweight and flexible to not hinder performance, while also providing adequate protection.
- Comfort: Materials should be comfortable to wear for extended periods, considering factors like breathability and moisture management.
- Chemical and Biological Protection: Textiles may need to provide protection against chemical and biological agents, requiring specific material designs and coatings.
- Camouflage Properties: Fabrics should have effective camouflage capabilities, including visual and near-infrared reflectance.
- Ventilation Rates: The ability of clothing to allow air flow and moisture movement to prevent heat stress.
- Mechanical Properties: High tensile and compressive strength, damage tolerance, and low specific weight are critical for ballistic protective equipment.

These parameters ensure that military textiles meet the demanding requirements of various operational environments while providing protection and comfort to the wearer.
