= Make and mend =

Make and mend is the term used in the Navy (notably Commonwealth of Nations navies) for an "afternoon off".

It is derived from the time of sailing ships when sailors would, occasionally but regularly, be allowed time to "make and mend" their uniforms, which were not then supplied by the Royal Navy.

Some sailors were, nevertheless, "on watch" to work (sail) the ship. The designated watch of sailors were still required to "turn to" if the ship's officers had to change the arrangement of the sails or rigging.

This afternoon off was often on Sunday. However, this time off was not a designated "holy day".

In the modern Royal Navy a Make and Mend would be usually be awarded to sailors who had been working during the night time hours, typical the Middle, Morning or Long Morning watches.

In Royal Navy training establishments, on Wednesday afternoons a "Sports Make and Mend" would be allocated to sailors to compete in inter-ship or inter-part games (such as football, rugby or hockey).
