= Fashoda syndrome =

French colonial policy in Africa

Fashoda syndrome or Fashoda complex is the name given to a tendency within French foreign policy in Africa, giving importance to asserting French influence in areas which might be becoming susceptible to British influence. It refers to the Fashoda Incident, which is considered the climax of the imperial territorial disputes between the United Kingdom and France in Eastern Africa, drawing these two nations to the brink of war in their bid to control the African Upper Nile region.

== Background ==
The term was coined by Gerard Prunier in his work on the 1898 confrontation between the British and French troops in southern Sudan, which he also cited as the cause for the latter's swift and deep intervention in the Rwanda crisis. It has been named after the Fashoda Incident. On 4 November 1898, a contingent of French troops occupied the fort in Fashoda (now Kodok in South Sudan). They were forced to withdraw, however, after a larger Anglo-Egyptian army led by Lord Kitchener took over and the conflict resolved by the Anglo-French Declaration of 21 March 1899. The incident was seen as a diplomatic victory for the British and, as a result, French foreign policy began emphasizing an aggressive pursuit of French influence in areas in Africa that are susceptible to British influence. This policy defined the so-called Fashoda syndrome and did not only denote the Anglo-French tussle in Africa but also the balance of power between these two, which was considered redolent of realpolitik.

In The State of Africa, the British historian Martin Meredith explained:

"Ever since an incident in the Sudanese village of Fashoda ... the French had been vigilant in guarding against Anglophone encroachment in what they considered to be their own backyard—le pré carré. In his memoirs, General de Gaulle listed the disasters that had afflicted France in his youth and that had led him to devote himself to upholding France's 'grandeur': the first on the list was the Fashoda incident. The 'Fashoda syndrome', as it was known, formed a basic component of France's Africa policy. To ensure that African issues received due attention, the French presidential office included a special Africa Unit—Cellule Africaine—with a wide remit to cover everything from intelligence work to bribery."

Meredith also concluded that the 1990 French intervention in Rwanda was an expression of the "syndrome". Rwanda lies on the border between "Francophone" and "Anglophone" Africa. In 1990, there was a short-lived invasion by the Rwandan Patriotic Front (RPF), a coalition of Tutsi exiles and those advocating democratic reform. Many of the RPF had grown up in Tutsi refugee camps in formerly British-controlled Uganda and had learned to fight in the Ugandan army, and Uganda was seen by Paris as being, at that time, within the British sphere of influence.

The Fashoda complex has been used in connection with foreign policies of other countries, particularly Egypt and Sudan. It was also the basis for the French interpretation of Laurent-Desire Kabila's rebellion.

== See also ==
- Françafrique
