= Fashoda Incident =

1898 Anglo-French dispute in East Africa

- Part of the Scramble for Africa
- Map of Central and East Africa during the incident
Date	10 July – 3 November 1898
Location	Fashoda, Sudan 09°53′15″N 32°06′37″E
Result	British victory

Belligerents
French Third Republic	United Kingdom; Khedivate of Egypt

Commanders and leaders
(French Third Republic) Jean-Baptiste Marchand	(United Kingdom) Herbert Kitchener

Strength
132 soldiers	1,500 British, Egyptian and Sudanese soldiers

Casualties and losses
None	None

The Fashoda Incident, also known as the Fashoda Crisis (French: Crise de Fachoda), was the climax of imperialist territorial disputes between Britain and France in East Africa, occurring between 10 July and 3 November 1898. A French expedition to Fashoda on the White Nile sought to gain control of the Upper Nile river basin and thereby exclude Britain from Sudan. The French party and a British-Egyptian force (outnumbering the French by 10 to 1) met on friendly terms. However, in Europe, it became a war scare. Both empires stood on the verge of war with heated rhetoric on both sides. Under heavy pressure, the French withdrew, ensuring Anglo-Egyptian control over the area.

== Background ==
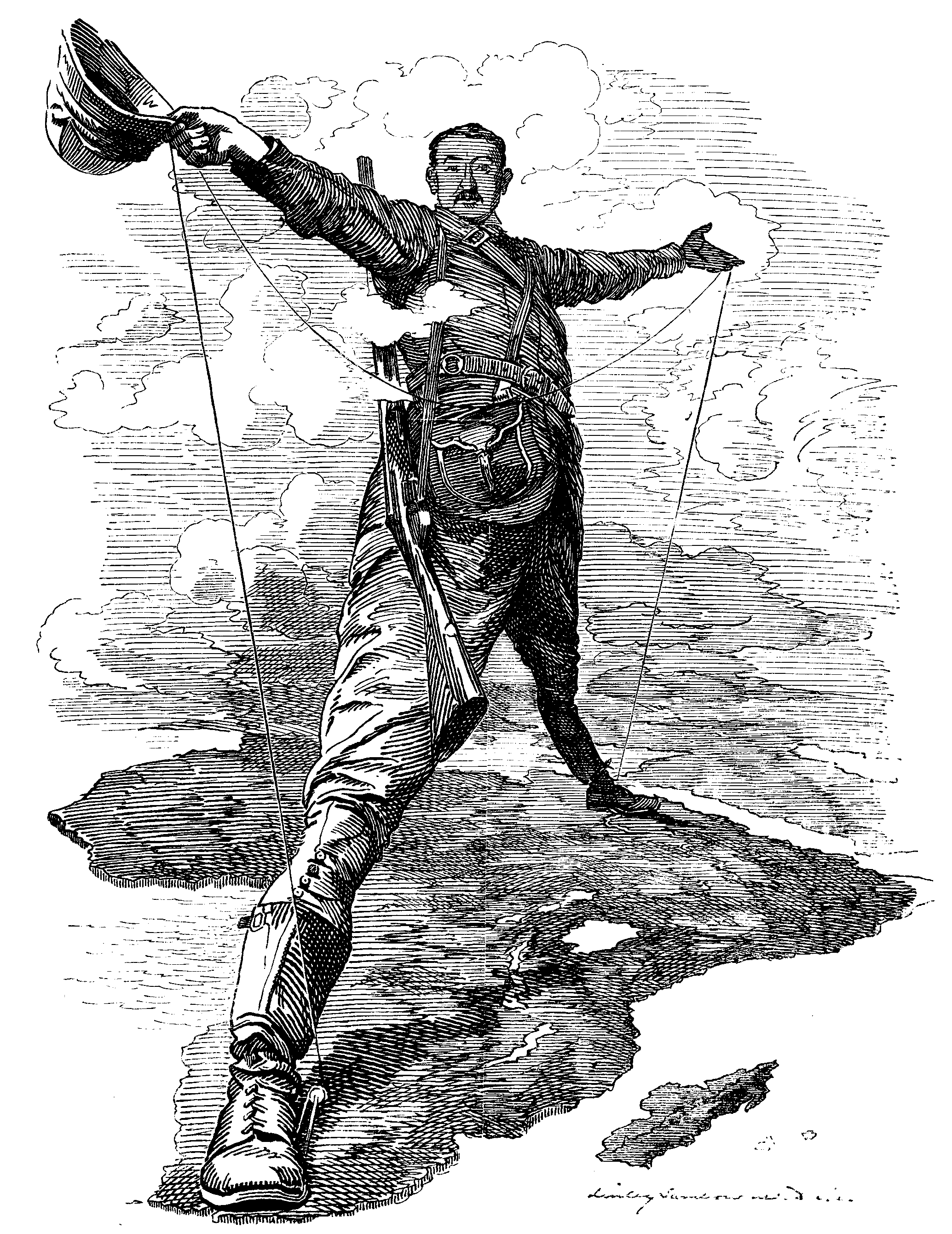
The Rhodes Colossus – cartoon by Edward Linley Sambourne, published in Punch after Rhodes announced plans for a telegraph line from Cape Town to Cairo in 1892.

During the late 19th century, Africa was rapidly being claimed and colonised by European colonial powers. After the 1885 Berlin Conference regarding West Africa, Europe's great powers went after any remaining lands in Africa that were not already under another European nation's influence. This period in African history is usually termed the Scramble for Africa by modern historiography. The principal powers involved in this scramble were Britain, France, Germany, Belgium, Italy, Portugal, and Spain.

The French thrust into the African interior was mainly from the continent's Atlantic coast (modern-day Senegal) eastward, through the Sahel along the southern border of the Sahara, a territory covering modern-day Senegal, Mali, Niger, and Chad. Their ultimate goal was to have an uninterrupted link between the Niger River and the Nile, hence controlling all trade to and from the Sahel region, by virtue of their existing control over the caravan routes through the Sahara. France also had an outpost near the mouth of the Red Sea in French Somaliland (now Djibouti), which could serve as an eastern anchor to an east–west belt of French territory across the continent at its widest point.

The British, on the other hand, wanted to link their possessions in Southern Africa (South Africa, Bechuanaland and Rhodesia), with their territories in East Africa (modern-day Kenya), and these two areas with the Nile basin. Sudan, which then included modern-day South Sudan and Uganda, was the key to the fulfilment of these ambitions, especially since Egypt was already under British control. This 'red line' (i.e., a proposed railway or road, see Cape to Cairo Railway) through Africa was made famous by the British diamond magnate and politician Cecil Rhodes, who wanted Africa "painted Red" (meaning under British control, since territories held by Britain were often coloured red on maps).

If one draws a line from Cape Town to Cairo (Rhodes's dream) and another line from Dakar to French Somaliland by the Red Sea in the Horn (the French ambition), these two lines intersect in eastern South Sudan near the town of Fashoda (present-day Kodok), explaining its strategic importance. The French east–west axis and the British north–south axis could not co-exist; the nation that could occupy and hold the crossing of the two axes would be the only one able to proceed with its plan.

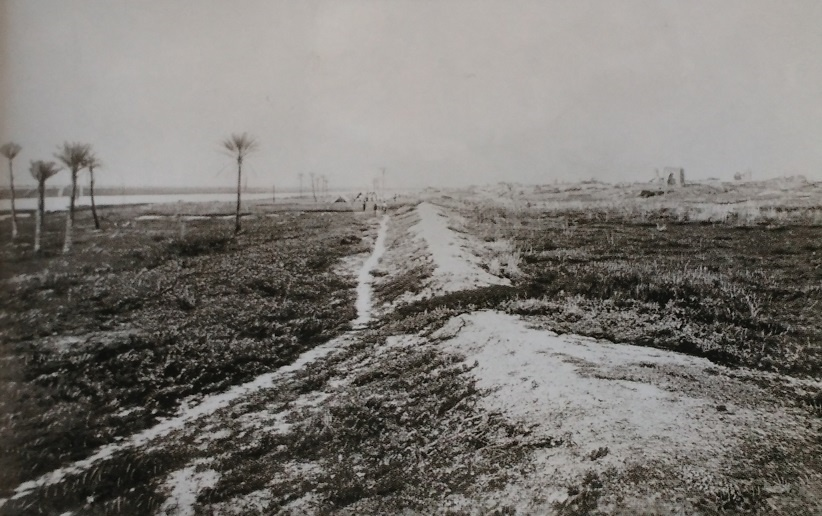
Ruins of the Egyptian fort at Fashoda, photographed in 1898.

Fashoda was founded by the Egyptian army in 1855 on high ground in a large boggy area and was situated at one of the few places where a boat on the Nile could unload. The area was inhabited by the Shilluk people, and by the mid-1870s, Fashoda was a market town. Wilhelm Junker, one of the first Europeans to arrive in the region described the town in 1876 as "a considerable trading place ... the last outpost of civilization, where travellers plunging into or returning from the wilds of equatorial Africa could procure a few indispensable European wares from the local Greek traders." By the time the French arrived in 1898, the Egyptian fort was deserted and in ruins.

Fashoda was also bound up in the Egyptian Question, a long-running dispute between the United Kingdom and France over the British occupation of Egypt. Since 1882 many French politicians, particularly those of the parti colonial, had come to regret France's decision not to join with Britain in occupying the country. They hoped to force Britain to leave, and thought that a colonial outpost on the Upper Nile could serve as a base for French gunboats. These in turn were expected to make the British abandon Egypt. Another proposed scheme involved a massive dam, cutting off the Nile's water supply and forcing the British out. These ideas were highly impractical, but they succeeded in alarming many British officials.

Other European nations were also interested in controlling the upper Nile valley. The Italians who had an outpost at Massawa on the Red Sea, made an attempt but their defeat at the Battle of Adwa in March 1896 ended it. In September 1896, King Leopold II, the Sovereign of the Congo Free State, sent a column of 5,000 Congolese troops, with artillery, towards the White Nile from Stanleyville on the Upper Congo River. After five months they reached Lake Albert, about 800 kilometres (500 mi) from Fashoda. The soldiers were upset at their treatment and mutinied on 18 March 1897. Many of the Belgian officers were killed and the rest fled.

== Crisis ==
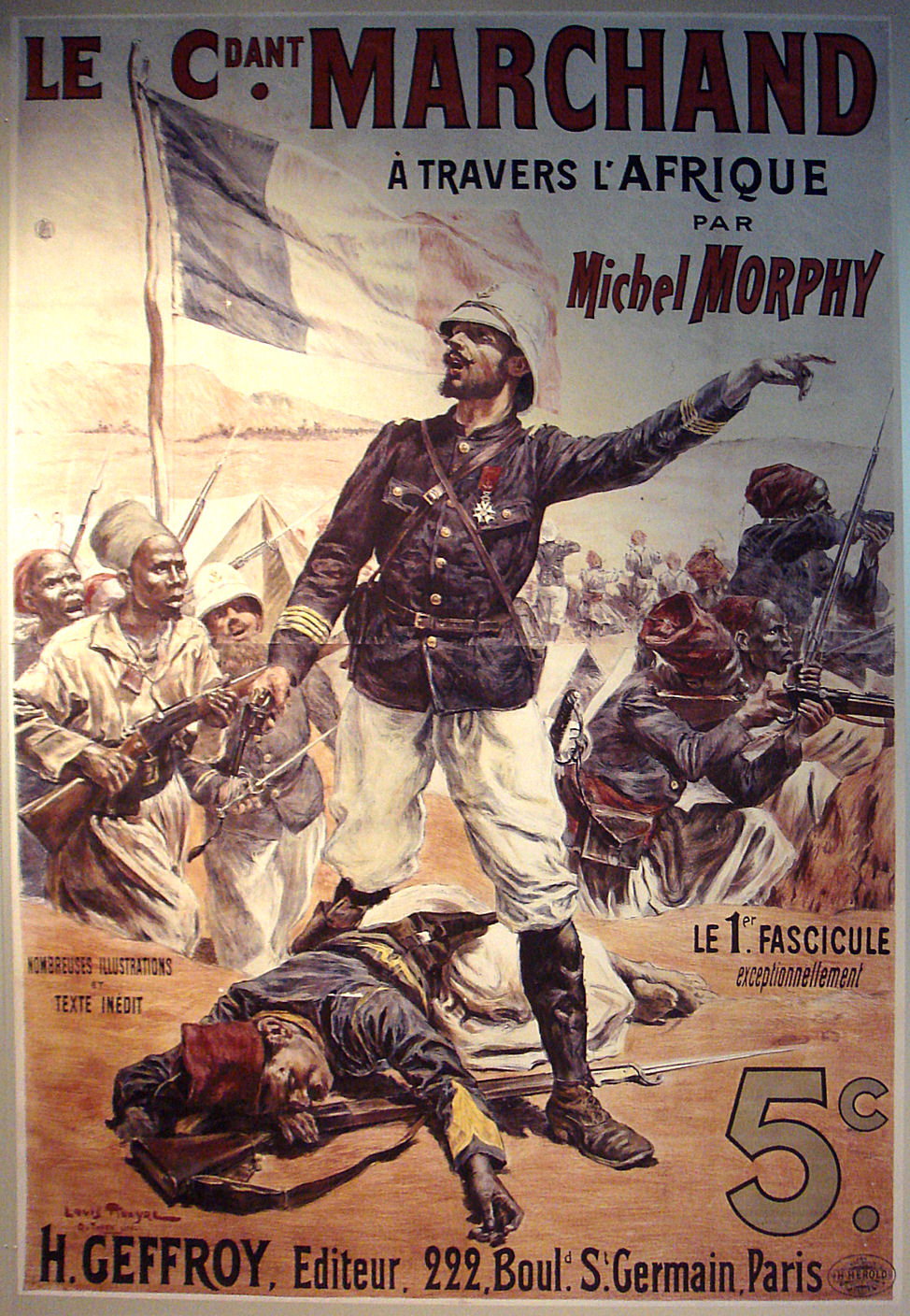
Contemporary illustration of Marchand's trek across Africa.

=== Marchand expedition ===
France made its move by sending Captain Jean-Baptiste Marchand, a veteran of the conquest of French Sudan, back to West Africa. He embarked a force composed mostly of West African colonial troops from Senegal on a ship for central Africa. On 20 June 1896, he reached Libreville in the colony of Gabon with a force of only 120 tirailleurs plus 12 French officers, non-commissioned officers and support staff—Captain Marcel Joseph Germain, Captain Albert Baratier, Captain Charles Mangin, Captain Victor Emmanuel Largeau, Lieutenant Félix Fouqué, a teacher named Dyé, doctor Jules Emily Major, Warrant Officer De Prat, Sergeant George Dat, Sergeant Bernard, Sergeant Venail and the military interpreter Landerouin.

Marchand's force set out from Brazzaville in a borrowed Belgian steamer with orders to secure the area around Fashoda and make it a French protectorate. They steamed up the Ubangi River to its head of navigation and then marched overland (carrying 100 tons of supplies, including a collapsible steel steamboat with a one-ton boiler) through jungle and scrub to the deserts of Sudan. They travelled across Sudan to the Nile. They were to be met there by two expeditions coming from the east across Ethiopia, one of which, from Djibouti, was led by Christian de Bonchamps, veteran of the Stairs Expedition to Katanga.

Following a difficult 14-month trek across the heart of Africa, the Marchand Expedition arrived on 10 July 1898, but the de Bonchamps Expedition failed to make it after being ordered by the Ethiopians to halt, and then suffering accidents in the Baro Gorge. Marchand's small force found itself alone, hundreds of miles from any support. The British, meanwhile, were engaged in the Anglo-Egyptian conquest of Sudan, moving upriver from Egypt. On 18 September a flotilla of five British gunboats arrived at the isolated Fashoda fort. They carried 1,500 British, Egyptian and Sudanese soldiers, led by Sir Herbert Kitchener and including Lieutenant-Colonel Horace Smith-Dorrien. Marchand had received incorrect reports that the approaching force consisted of Dervishes; he found himself facing a diplomatic rather than a military crisis.

=== Kitchener's Advance ===
As the commander of the Anglo-Egyptian army that had just defeated the forces of Muhammad Ahmad at the Battle of Omdurman (2 September 1898), Kitchener was in the process of reconquering Sudan in the name of the Egyptian Khedive. After the battle he opened sealed orders to investigate the French expedition, some 400 miles (640 km) upriver. Kitchener arrived at Fashoda on 19 September, wearing an Egyptian Army uniform, and, in a meeting with Marchand on the same day, insisted on raising the Egyptian flag, at some distance from the French flag, a request which was accepted by Marchand, but on condition that the raising of the Egyptian flag does not prejudge the political status of the territory.

=== Standoff at Fashoda ===
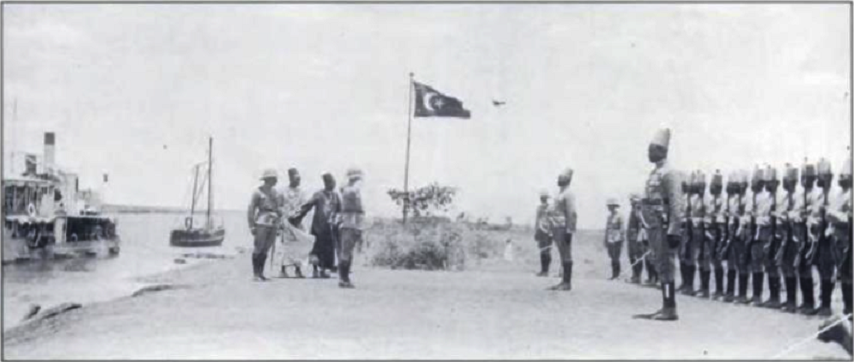
Arrival of the Anglo-Egyptian troops at Fashoda.

Both sides insisted on their right to Fashoda but agreed to wait for further instructions from home. The two commanders behaved with restraint and even a certain humour. Kitchener toasted Marchand with whisky, the drinking of which the French officer described as "one of the greatest sacrifices I ever made for my country". Kitchener inspected a French garden commenting "Flowers at Fashoda. Oh these Frenchmen!" More seriously, the British distributed French newspapers detailing the political chaos caused by the Dreyfus affair, warning that France was in no condition to provide serious support for Marchand and his party. News of the meeting was relayed to Paris and London, where it inflamed the pride of both nations. Widespread popular outrage followed, each side accusing the other of naked expansionism and aggression. The crisis continued throughout September and October 1898. The Royal Navy drafted war orders and mobilized its reserves.

=== French withdrawal ===
In naval terms, the situation was heavily in Britain's favour, a fact that French deputies acknowledged in the aftermath of the crisis. Several historians have given credit to Marchand for remaining calm. The military facts were undoubtedly important to Théophile Delcassé, the newly appointed French foreign minister. "They have soldiers. We only have arguments," he said resignedly. In addition, he saw no advantage in a war with the British, especially since he was keen to gain their friendship in case of any future conflict with Germany. He therefore pressed hard for a peaceful resolution of the crisis even though it had led to a wave of nationalism and anti-British sentiment in France. In an editorial published in L'Intransigeant on 13 October, Victor Henri Rochefort wrote "Germany keeps slapping us in the face. Let's not offer our cheek to England." As P. M. H. Bell writes,

Between the two governments there was a brief battle of wills, with the British insisting on immediate and unconditional French withdrawal from Fashoda. The French had to accept these terms, amounting to a public humiliation.

The French government quietly ordered its soldiers to withdraw on 3 November and the crisis ended peacefully. Marchand withdrew his small force by way of Abyssinia and Djibouti, rather than cross Egyptian territory by taking the relatively quick journey by steamer down the Nile.

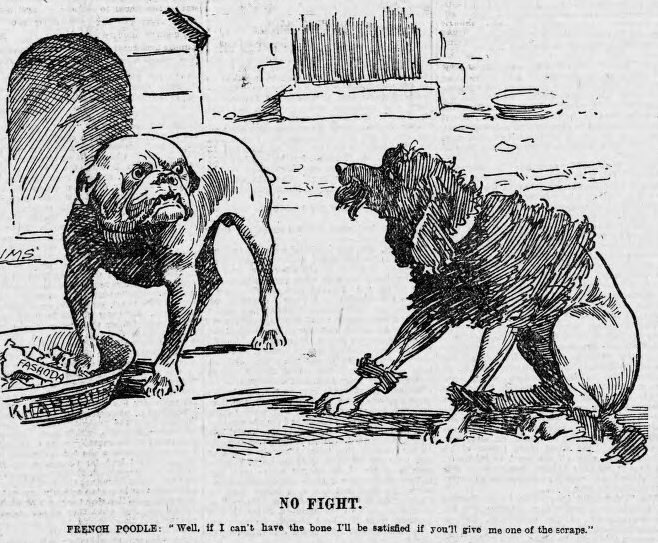
Cartoon by Joseph Morewood Staniforth on the incident. A French poodle says to a British bulldog: "Well, if I can't have the bone I'll be satisfied if you give me one of the scraps."

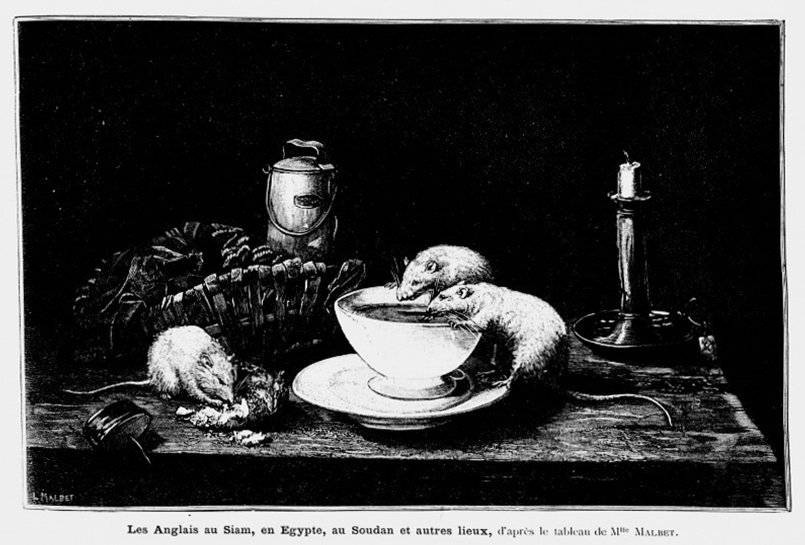
A painting by Aurélie Léontine Malbet depicting mice eating food. It was published in the 19 November 1898 issue of La France illustrée with an added caption that read "The English in Siam, Egypt, the Sudan and other places".

== Aftermath ==
Fashoda was a major diplomatic defeat and a national humiliation for France. According to French nationalists, the capitulation was clear evidence that the French Army had been severely weakened by the Dreyfusards. It also inspired intense anti-British sentiment, and some French people claimed that Britain might be preparing to attack France. The reopening of the Dreyfus affair in January the following year had done much to distract French public opinion from events in Sudan and people increasingly questioned the wisdom of a war over such a remote part of Africa. Nevertheless, it put an end to French ambitions of an equatorial empire stretching from the West coast to the East. Britain, meanwhile, relished in the success, and although wary of French retaliation her coercive policy had resolved the crisis.

The French also realized that in the long run they needed the friendship of Britain in case of a war between France and Germany. Historians note that Germany could have exploited the Fashoda Crisis to pivot France away from Britain or provoke Anglo-French conflict to divert France's attention and weaken both rivals in which Germany might gain leverage by diplomatic support to France to secure alignment against Britain, potentially isolating Britain in Africa, Instead, Germany remained passive. Kaiser Wilhelm's intermittent signalling of interest was insufficient; the German government made no concrete offers to France. A passive observation ensured Germany lost a rare strategic opening in late-19th-century colonial and blunder European diplomacy.

In March 1899, the Anglo-French Convention of 1898 was signed. One of its provisions was an agreement that the watersheds of the Nile and the Congo rivers should mark the frontier between their spheres of influence. The Fashoda Incident was the last serious colonial dispute between Britain and France, and its classic diplomatic solution is considered by most historians to be the precursor of the Entente Cordiale of 1904. The same year, Fashoda was officially renamed Kodok. It is located in modern-day South Sudan.

=== Legacy ===
A French colonial officer, George de Villebois-Mareuil, saw the Second Boer War as a chance to avenge the French humiliation at Fashoda—he was however killed at the Battle of Boshof. The two main individuals involved in the incident are commemorated in the Kitchener-Marchand bridge, a 116-metre (381 ft) road bridge over the Saône, completed in 1959 in the French city of Lyon.

The incident gave rise to the 'Fashoda syndrome' in French foreign policy — a tendency to assert French influence in areas which might be becoming susceptible to British influence. As such it was used as a comparison to other later crises or conflicts such as the Levant Crisis of 1945, the Nigerian Civil War in Biafra in the 1970s and the Rwandan Civil War in 1994.

== See also ==
- 1890 British Ultimatum
- Anglo-Egyptian conquest of Sudan
- Egyptian Lever
- History of France–United Kingdom relations
- International relations (1814–1919)
- Pink Map

== General and cited references ==
- Andrew, G.; et al. (1974). "Gabriel Hanotaux, the Colonial Party and the Fashoda Strategy". J. Imp. Commonw. Hist. 3 (1): 55–104. doi:10.1080/03086537408582422.
- Bates, D. (1984). The Fashoda Incident of 1898: Encounter on the Nile. Oxford University Press. ISBN 0192117718.
- Bell, P. M. H. (2014a). France and Britain, 1900–1940: Entente and Estrangement. London: Routledge. ISBN 9781317892731.
- Bell, P. M. H (2014b). France and Britain, 1940–1994: The Long Separation. Routledge. ISBN 9781317888413.
- Berenson, Edward H (2010). Heroes of Empire: Five charismatic men and the conquest of Africa. University of California Press.
- Brown, R. (1970). Fashoda Reconsidered: The Impact of Domestic Politics on French Policy in Africa, 1893–1898. Johns Hopkins University Press. ISBN 9780801810985.
- Churchill, W. (1899). The River War: An Historical Account of the Reconquest of the Soudan. London: Longmans, Green & Co. OCLC 2704682.
- Eubank, K. (1960). "The Fashoda Crisis Re-Examined". Historian. 22 (2): 145–162. doi:10.1111/j.1540-6563.1960.tb01649.x.
- Giffen, M. (1930). Fashoda, the Incident and Its Diplomatic Setting. University of Chicago Press. OCLC 993310905.
- Horne, A. (2006). La Belle France: A Short History. New York: Vintage. ISBN 9781400034871.
- Kumar, Krishan (2016). The Idea of Englishness English Culture, National Identity and Social Thought. Taylor & Francis. ISBN 9781317028154.
- Langer, W. (1951). The Diplomacy of Imperialism, 1890–1902. New York: Alfred A. Knopf. OCLC 787805.
- Lewis, D. (1988). The Race to Fashoda: European Colonialism & African Resistance in the Scramble for Africa. London: Bloomsbury. ISBN 9780747501138.
- Moorehead, A. (2002). The White Nile. London: Penguin. ISBN 9780141391168.
- Pakenham, T. (1991). The Scramble for Africa, 1876–1912. New York: Random House. ISBN 9780394515762.
- Peterson, Susan (1996). Crisis Bargaining and the State The Domestic Politics of International Conflict By. University of Michigan Press. ISBN 9780472106288.
- Porter, C. (1975). The Career of Théophile Delcassé. Westport: Greenwood. pp. 132–139. ISBN 9780837177205.
- Riker, T. (1979). "A Survey of British Policy in the Fashoda Crisis". Political Science Quarterly. 44 (1): 54–78. doi:10.2307/2142814. JSTOR 2142814.
- Schmidt, Elizabeth (2013). Foreign Intervention in Africa: From the Cold War to the War on Terror Issue 7 of New Approaches to African History. Cambridge University Press. ISBN 9780521882385.
- Taylor, A. (1950). "Prelude to Fashoda: The Question of the Upper Nile, 1894–5". English Historical Review. 65 (254): 52–80. doi:10.1093/ehr/lxv.ccliv.52.
- Taylor, A. (1954). The Struggle for Mastery in Europe, 1848–1918. Oxford: Clarendon Press. OCLC 123580339.
- Turton, E. R. (1976). "Lord Salisbury and the Macdonald Expedition". Journal of Imperial and Commonwealth History. 5 (1): 35–52. doi:10.1080/03086537608582472. Archived from the original on 14 June 2022.
- Vaïsse, M. (2004). L'Entente cordiale de Fachoda à la Grande Guerre: dans les archives du Quai d'Orsay (in French). Brussels: Éditions Complexe. ISBN 9782804800062.
- Wright, Patricia (August 1972). "The French Fashoda Expedition 1896–99". History Today. Vol. 22, no. 8. pp. 564–575. Archived from the original on 3 November 2023.
- Wright, Patricia (1972). Conflict on the Nile: The Fashoda Incident of 1898. London: Heinemann. ISBN 9780434878307. OCLC 185779517.
