= France and the Commonwealth of Nations =

International relations

Relations between the French Republic and the Commonwealth of Nations have undergone successive periods of change since the Commonwealth's creation.

The Commonwealth's predecessor, the British Empire, was a notable rival to France's own empire. Even through eras of Entente cordiale, decolonisation, and political integration with the United Kingdom (the leading Commonwealth member) in the European Union, there has been conflict between French and Commonwealth interests, particularly in Africa. The Fashoda syndrome has shaped French attitudes to prevent Commonwealth influence in French-speaking countries, believing their interests to be mutually-exclusive.

Despite these rivalries and dual structures, at times, it has been suggested that France join the Commonwealth. In 1956, during the Suez Crisis, during which France and the United Kingdom's interests in the Middle East aligned, it was proposed by French Prime Minister Guy Mollet that France and the UK create a Franco-British Union, with common citizenship and Queen Elizabeth II as head of state. His British counterpart, Anthony Eden, instead proposed that France join the Commonwealth, with Commonwealth citizenship rights and recognising the Queen as Head of the Commonwealth. However, this was rejected by Mollet.

== Francophonie ==
La Francophonie, which was founded to promote the French language and French culture, as well as pooled scientific research, is often considered France's equivalent of the Commonwealth of Nations. However, its structure and institutions, whilst superficially being similar to the Commonwealth, are more similar to the United Nations, in relying upon majority voting, rather than consensus, as the Commonwealth does.

La Francophonie also adopts a very different philosophy to the Commonwealth, particularly due to its lacking institutional ties to NGOs its equivalent of the Commonwealth Foundation or Commonwealth Family. Nonetheless, La Francophonie spends ten times as much money per inhabitant as the Commonwealth (€0.30 cf. €0.03), reflecting France's dedication to promoting Francophonie relations.

Twelve countries are full members of both La Francophonie and the Commonwealth (Cameroon, Canada, Cyprus, Dominica, Gabon, Ghana, Mauritius, Rwanda, Saint Lucia, Seychelles, Togo and Vanuatu) and Mozambique is an observer. In the wake of the genocide there, Francophonie member Rwanda has made recent moves away from France's sphere of influence, has replaced French with English as an official language, and joined the Commonwealth at the 2009 Commonwealth Heads of Government Meeting.

Before La Francophonie, since the foundation and expansion of the Commonwealth, France has created a number of political and cultural unions that have attempted to simulate its model amongst France's former colonial possessions and French-speaking countries. The French Union was created in 1946 and was succeeded by the short-lived French Community in 1958, which folded when its members gained independence.
