= Kodok =

Kodok: Kothok; Fashoda
- Town
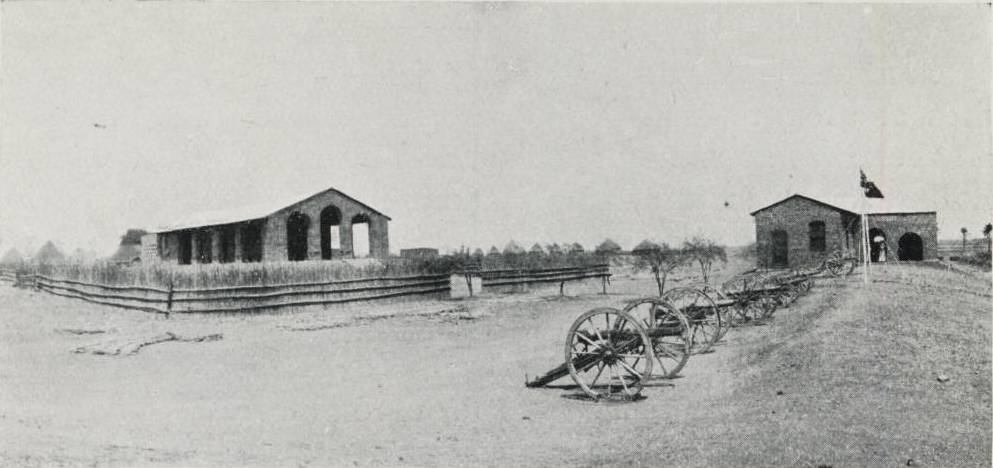

- Location in South Sudan
- Coordinates: 09°53′15″N 32°06′37″E
- Country: South Sudan
- Region: Greater Upper Nile
- State: Upper Nile State
- County: Fashoda County

Population (2012)
  - Total: 7,709
- Time zone: UTC+2 (CAT)

Kodok or Kothok (Arabic: كودوك), formerly known as Fashoda, is a town in the Fashoda County of Upper Nile State, in the Greater Upper Nile region of South Sudan. Kodok is the capital of Shilluk country, formally known as the Shilluk Kingdom. Shilluk had been an independent kingdom for more than sixteen centuries. Fashoda is best known as the place where the British and French nearly went to war in 1898 in the Fashoda Incident.

According to Shilluk belief, religion, tradition and constitution, Kodok serves as the mediating city for the Shilluk King. It is a place where ceremonies and the coronation of each new Shilluk King takes place. For over 500 years, Kodok was kept hidden and acted as a forbidden city for the Shilluk King, but as modern educations and traditions emerge, Kodok is now known to the outside world. Kodok is believed to be a place where the spirit of Juok (God), the spirit of Nyikango (the founder of Shilluk Kingdom and the spiritual leader of Shilluk religion), the spirit of the deceased Shilluk kings and the spirit of the living Shilluk King come to mediate for the Kingdom of Shilluk's spiritual healing. Kodok is preserved as a quiet place for the spirit of God, where the sounds and speeches of God (Juok) can be heard and received by the King, leaders, and elders. For the Shilluk, Kodok is a city of mediation and peace.

== History ==
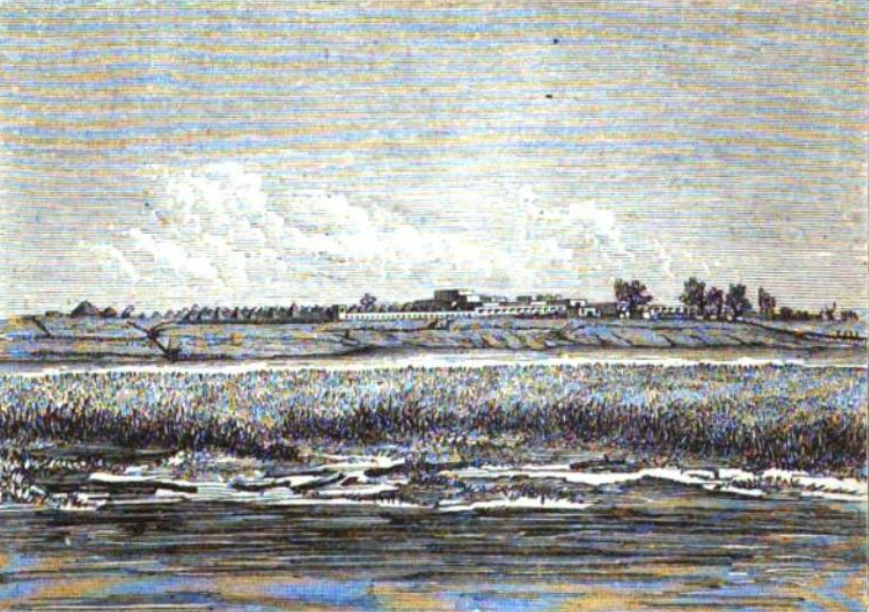
Fashoda in 1869

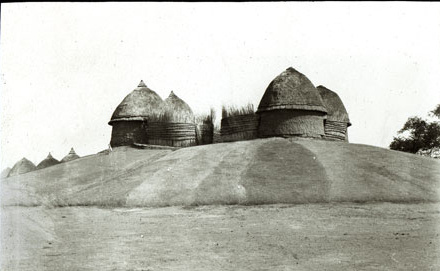
Aturwic, the homestead mound of the Shilluk king at Pachodo (Fashoda) with his four huts built on top. Photo by Charles Gabriel Seligman

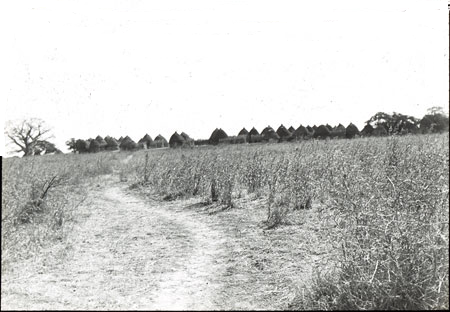
Photograph of Fashoda by Charles Gabriel Seligman

An Egyptian military post was established at Fashoda in 1865. It was then a trading station of some importance, including a slave trade. Between 1883 and 1884 the place fell into the hands of the Mahdists. However, historically Fashoda is chiefly known for being the site of the 1898 Fashoda Incident between the United Kingdom and France. The British were attempting to create a solid block of influence from southern Africa through East Africa to Egypt, which was already under British control. Meanwhile, the French were attempting to expand from West Africa along the southern border of the Sahara Desert in order to control all of the trade through the Sahel. The intersection of these lines of intended control passed through Kodok, and a standoff between armed expeditionary forces led the two countries to the brink of war. The outcome in Britain's favour contributed to the stabilisation of colonial claims and the eventual end of the "Scramble for Africa". The incident gave rise to what is known as the "Fashoda syndrome" in French foreign policy. In 1904, the development of the Anglo-French Entente Cordiale prompted the British to change the town's name to Kodok (Kothok) in the hope of obliterating the memory of the incident.

The Evangelical Church Mission Society (CMS) was assigned in 1898 by the British colonial administration to Kodok awarded to the missionary, after they had been denied the location of Khartoum. The Catholic Verona Fathers were also given the area west of the Nile and the Presbyterian Church (USA) the east to the Ethiopian border. From 1900, the missionaries were in low numbers and encountered territorial disputes, but in the 1920s, complaints were made by the CMS about the expansion of the Catholics on their territory. In January 1933, a Catholic Mission was established in Kodok and since 1974 has been classified under the Diocese of Malakal. From the 1930s, Kodok was also a centre of the Presbyterians, so Kodok has a major Christian influence.

In 1955, the population of Kodok was about 9,100. During the First Sudanese Civil War in 1964, during the reign of Muhammad Ahmad Mahjub, Kodok was the scene of a massacre by the military in Khartoum. Similar massacres in 1964 and 1965 also took place in other cities in southern Sudan.

In the 1990s, Kodok suffered a serious famine and saw many charities brought to the region, especially Operation Lifeline Sudan. In 2004 and 2005, at the end of the Second Sudanese Civil War, many refugees returned but the security situation in 2004 was still very critical.

Today the inhabitants of Kodok are mainly involved in subsistence farming and grow as a staple of their diet millet and rear cattle. From the mid-1990s they began marketing gum arabic, obtained from Acacia seyal and sold to Arab traders from the north. There are also ongoing local disputes in the area between Kodok and the south of Malakal on the Nile for land rights and water distribution.
