= The State of Africa =

2005 non-fiction book by Martin Meredith

The State of Africa: A History Of Fifty Years Of Independence
- Author: Martin Meredith
- Language: English
- Subject: History of Africa; Politics of Africa
- Published: London
- Publisher: Free Press; Simon & Schuster
- Publication date: 2005
- Publication place: United Kingdom
- Pages: 752
- ISBN: 9780743232210
- OCLC: 607697514
- Dewey Decimal: 960.32

The State of Africa: A History Of Fifty Years Of Independence (also published under the title The Fate of Africa: From the Hopes of Freedom to the Heart of Despair; republished in 2011 as The State of Africa: A History Of The Continent Since Independence) is a 2005 book by British writer Martin Meredith.

== Background and synopsis ==
The book is an in-depth investigation into the history of Africa since European decolonisation. Meredith examines the many challenges much of Africa has faced including civil conflict and lawlessness, government corruption and dictatorships. Africa is described as a continent where "bad-news stories (famine, genocide, corruption) massively outweigh the good (South Africa)."

== Reception ==
Australian The Age newspaper writer Pamela Bone wrote that in "this big, exhaustive history Martin Meredith leaves us in little doubt as to what he believes is the primary cause of Africa's pain: its corrupt, tyrannical, incompetent, thieving, "vampire-like" leaders... It documents, country by country, decade by decade, a depressing litany of wars, revolutions, dictatorships, famines, genocide, coups and economic collapse". While Bone wrote that the book is an "impressive history, well told" she criticised the fact that "the book misses the spirit of Africa, the joyfulness and strength of the people, which persists despite their appalling hardships, and which gives hope".

Writing in The Independent, Alex Duval Smith described The State of Africa as a "dispassionate analysis" that "does more than perhaps he (Meredith) realises to set the past 50 African years in a continuum"

Chris Nkwatsibwe, a human rights activist from Uganda praised the book. Nkwatsibwe wrote that "Meredith works with the colossal spatial and temporal span of this subject with ease, weaving chapters together in a loose chronological order to present the narrative as a patchwork quilt of Africa, rather than as a rigid country-by-country timeline".

== See also ==
- Elephant Destiny, another book by the same author
