= Elephant Destiny =

2009 non-fiction book by Martin Meredith

Elephant Destiny: Biography Of An Endangered Species In Africa
- Author: Martin Meredith
- Language: English
- Genre: Nonfiction
- Published: 2009
- Publisher: PublicAffairs
- Publication place: UK
- Pages: 256
- ISBN: 9780786728381

Elephant Destiny: Biography Of An Endangered Species In Africa is a 2009 non-fiction book by Martin Meredith published by Public Affairs. It discusses the African elephant, its risk of extinction, and its interwoven history with Africa's development, dating to the time of the pharaohs.
