= Martin Meredith =

British historian, journalist and biographer

- Occupations: Author and commentator
- Writing career
- Genres: Biographies, history

Martin Meredith (born 1942) is a historian, journalist, and biographer. He has written several books on Africa and its modern history.

== Life ==
Meredith first worked as a foreign correspondent in Africa for The Observer and Sunday Times, then as a research fellow at St Antony's College, Oxford. Living near Oxford, he is now an independent commentator and author.

Meredith's writing has been described as authoritative and well-documented, despite the pessimism so often imposed upon his subject matter.

== Bibliography ==
- The Fortunes of Africa: A 5,000-Year History of Wealth, Greed and Endeavour (2014) ISBN 978-1-86842-643-0
- The State of Africa: A History of the Continent Since Independence reprinted (2011); revised and updated (2021) ISBN 978-1-471-19641-6
- Born in Africa: The Quest for the Origins of Human Life. Simon and Schuster. 2011. ISBN 978-0-85720-667-1.
- Diamonds, Gold and War: The Making of South Africa (2007) ISBN 978-1-58648-473-6
- Mugabe: Power, Plunder, and the Struggle for Zimbabwe's Future (2007) ISBN 978-1-58648-558-0
- The State of Africa: A History of Fifty Years of Independence (2005) ISBN 978-0-7432-3222-7; (US edition:) The Fate of Africa: From the Hopes of Freedom to the Heart of Despair (2005) ISBN 978-1-58648-398-2
- Elephant Destiny: Biography of an Endangered Species in Africa (2004) ISBN 978-1-58648-233-6
- Our Votes, Our Guns: Robert Mugabe and the Tragedy of Zimbabwe (2003) ISBN 978-1-58648-186-5
- Fischer's Choice: The Life of Bram Fischer (2002) ISBN 978-1-86842-131-2
- Coming to Terms: South Africa’s Search for Truth (2001) ISBN 978-1-903985-09-0
- Nelson Mandela: A Biography (1999) ISBN 978-0-312-19992-0
- South Africa’s New Era: The 1994 Election (1994) ISBN 978-0749319106
- In the Name of Apartheid: South Africa in the Post War Period (1988) ISBN 978-0241124956
- The First Dance of Freedom: Black Africa in the Postwar Era (1984) ISBN 978-0241113400
- The Past is Another Country: Rhodesia 1890–1979 (1979) ISBN 0-233-97121-1; revised and expanded (1980) ISBN 0-330-26268-8

== See also ==
- Colin Legum (1919–2003), South African journalist and writer on Africa
- Basil Davidson (1914–2010), British journalist and writer on Africa
