= Egyptian Army Uniform =

The Egyptian Army uses a British Army Style ceremonial outfit, and a desert camouflage overall implemented in 2012. The Identification between different branches within the Egyptian Army depends on the branch insignia on the left upper arm and the color of the beret. Additionally, the Airborne, Thunderbolt, and the Republican Guard have their own camouflage overall.

== Ceremonial outfit ==
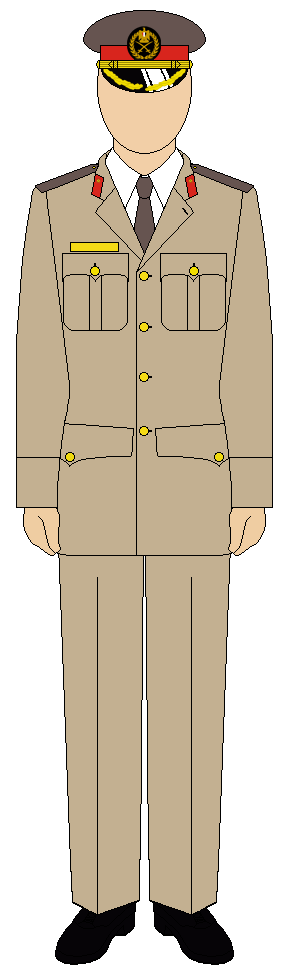
Summer (generals)

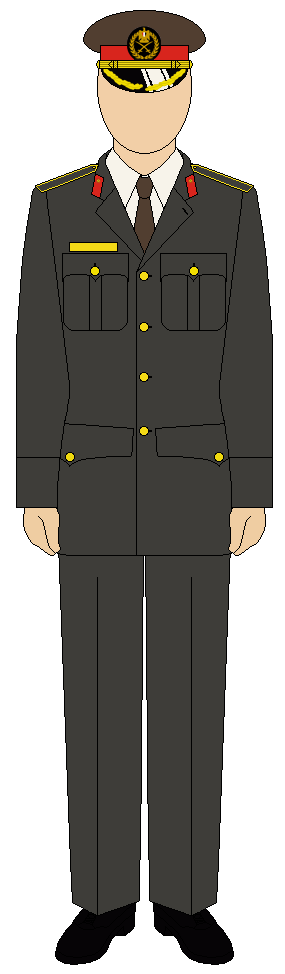
Winter (generals)

== Everyday outfit ==
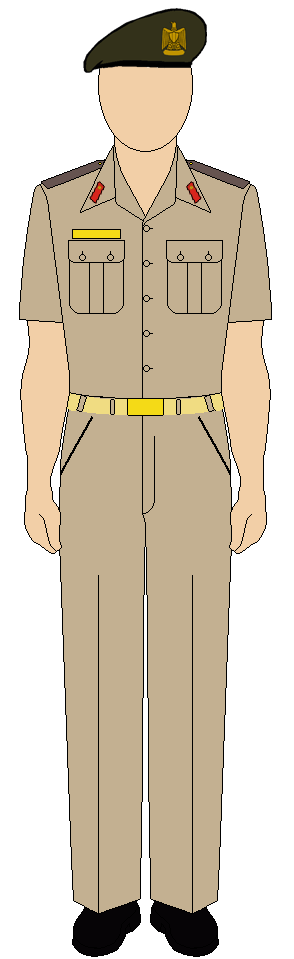
Summer

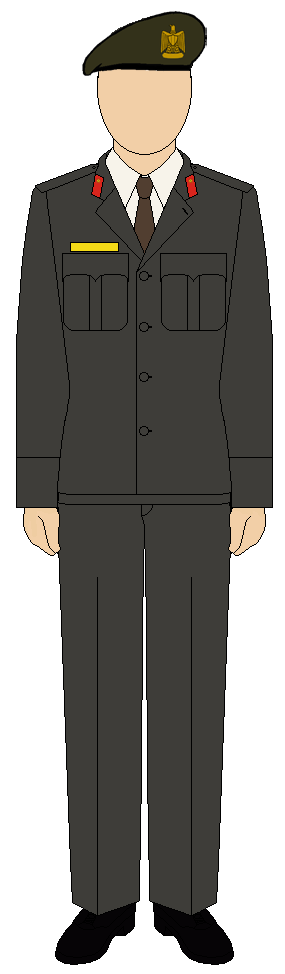
Winter

== Field overall ==
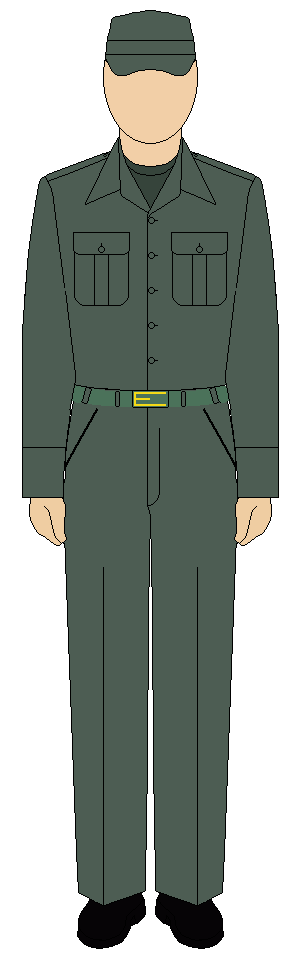

== Republican Guard ==
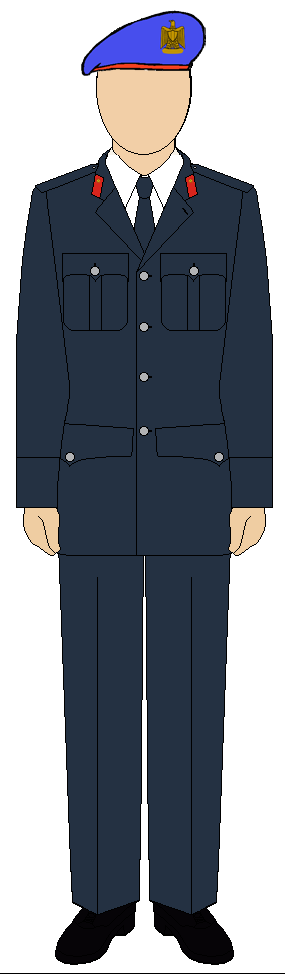
Everyday suit

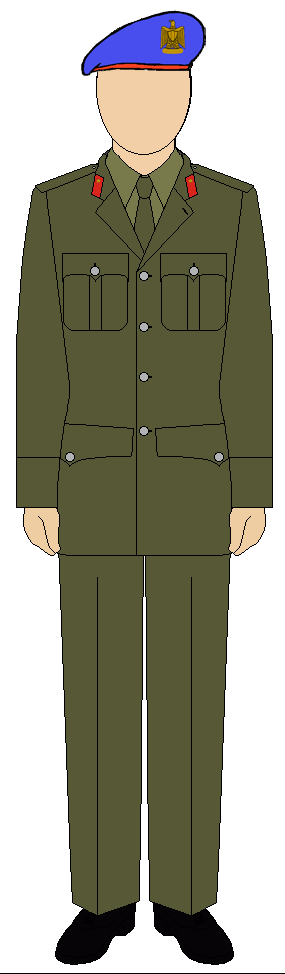
Republican Guard Police Forces

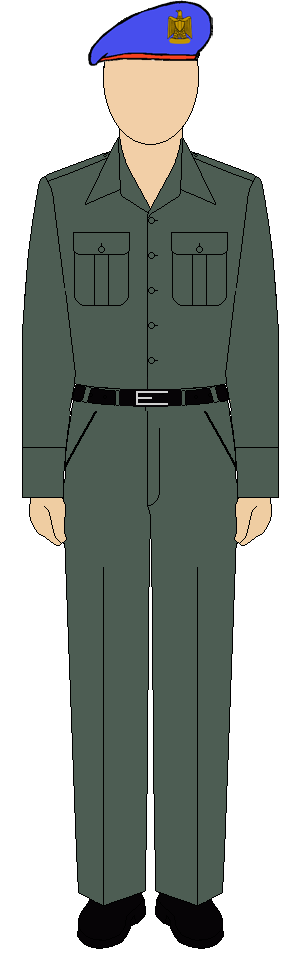
Field outfit

== Camouflage suit ==
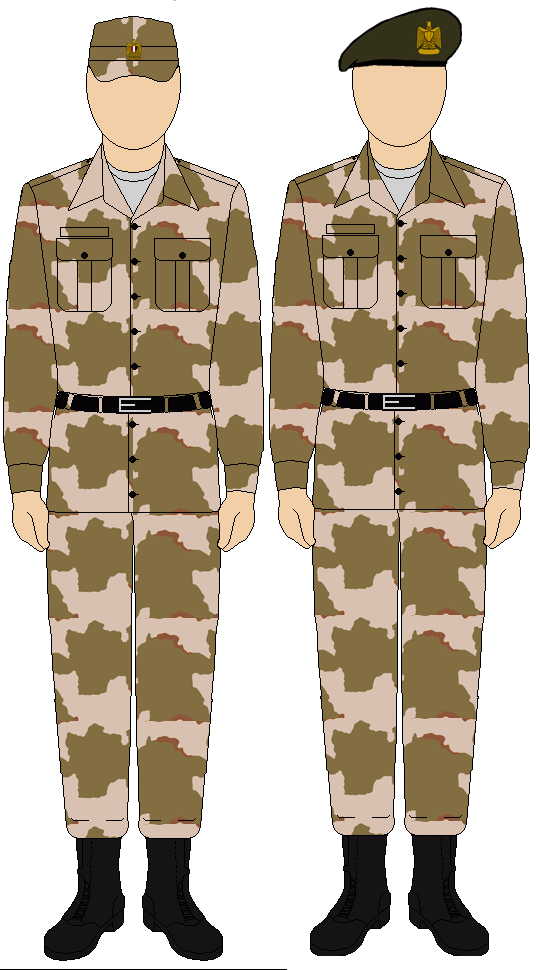
Army

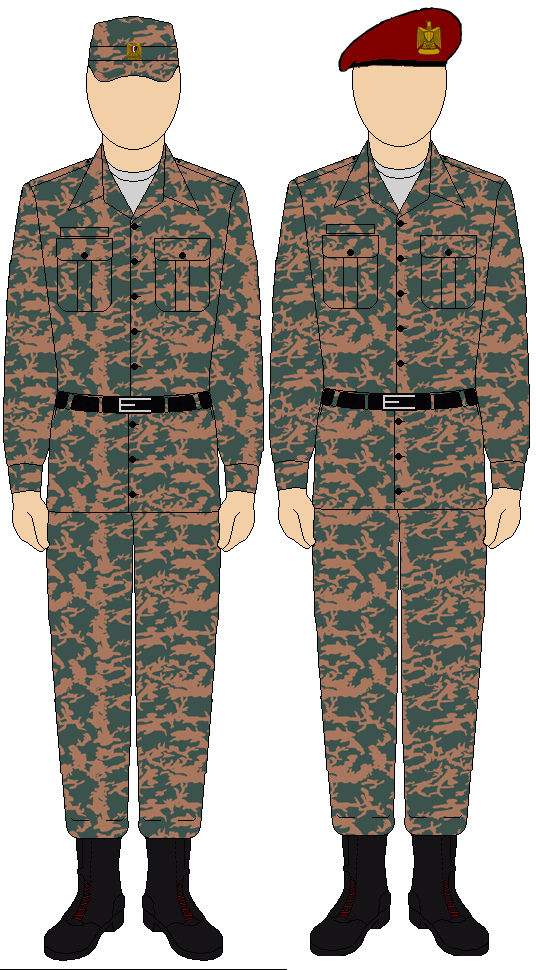
Airborne

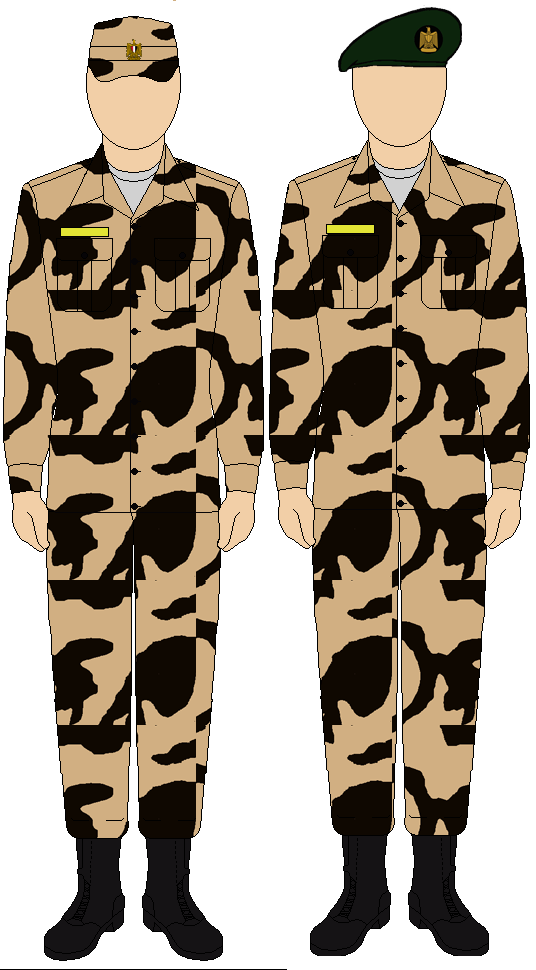
Thunderbolt

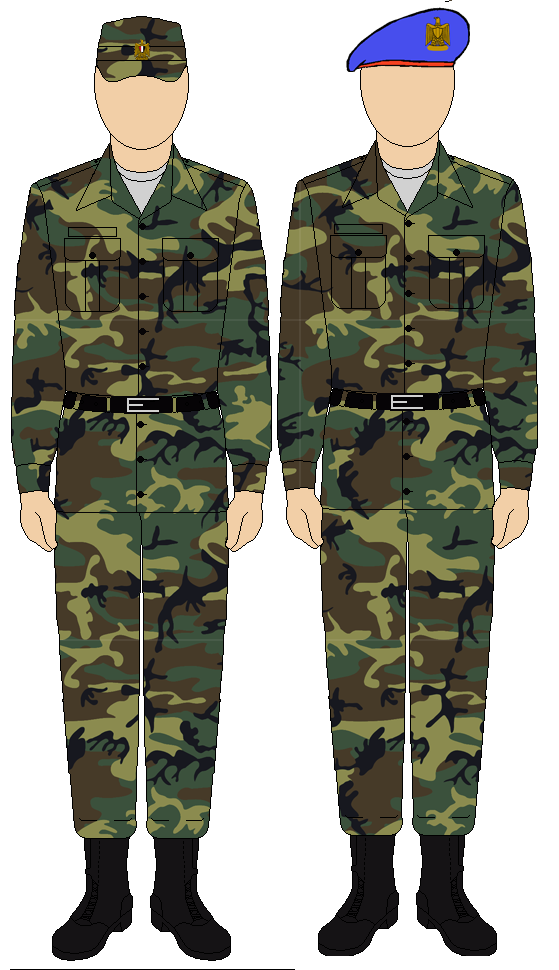
Republican Guard

== Berets ==
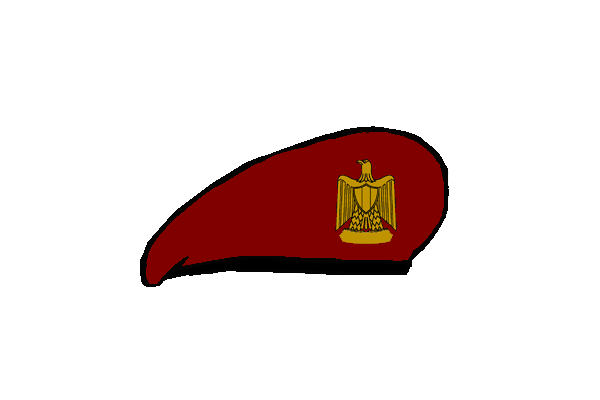
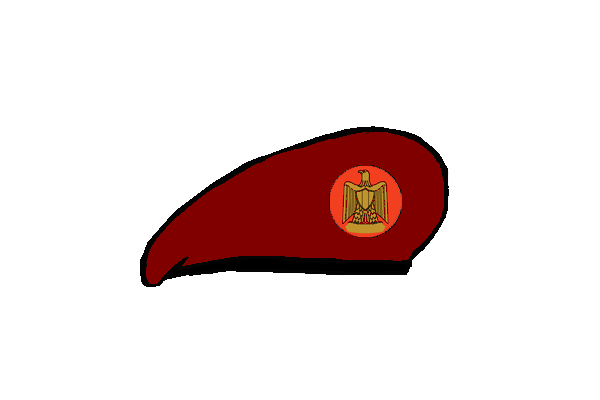
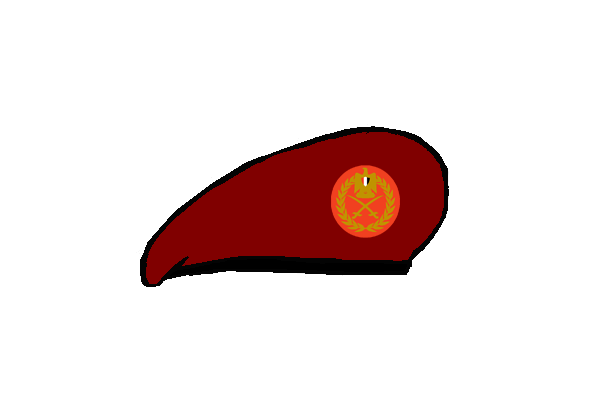
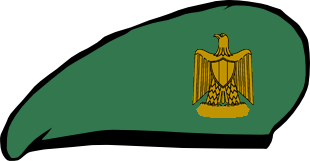
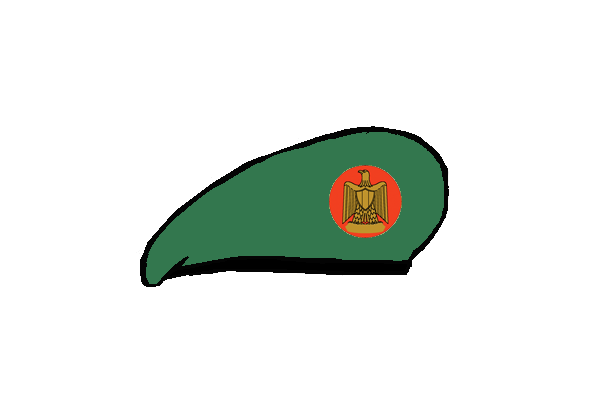
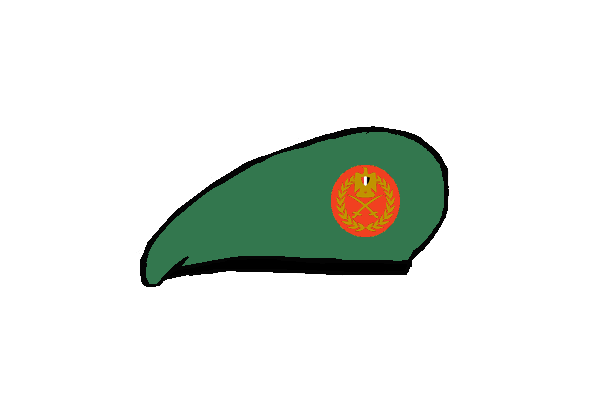
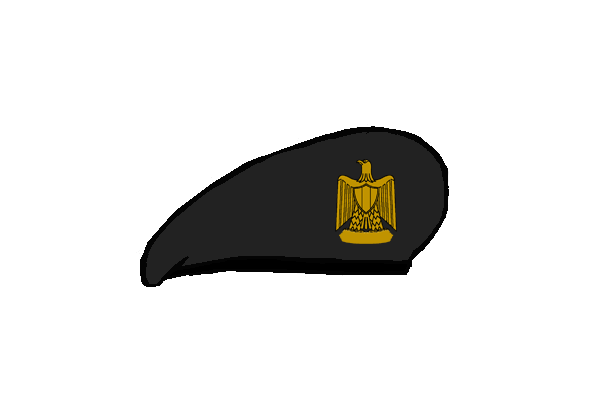
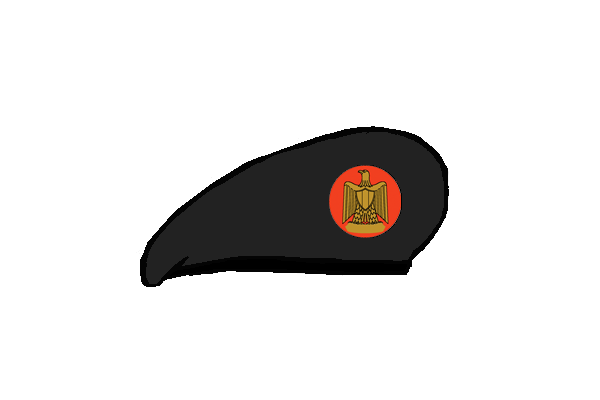
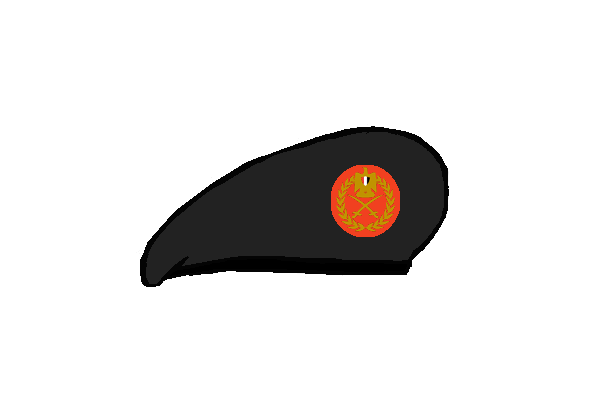
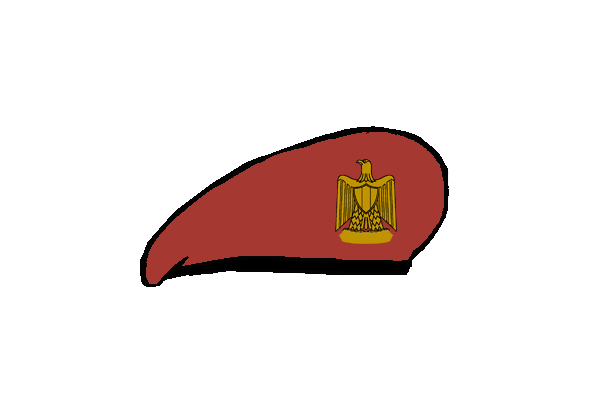
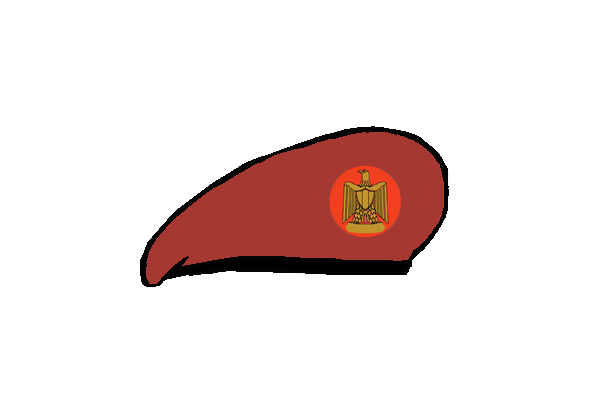
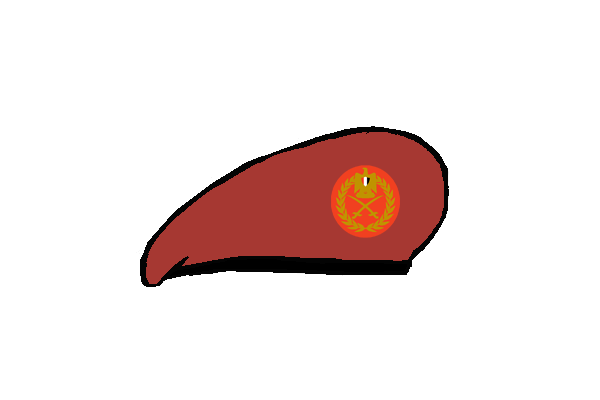
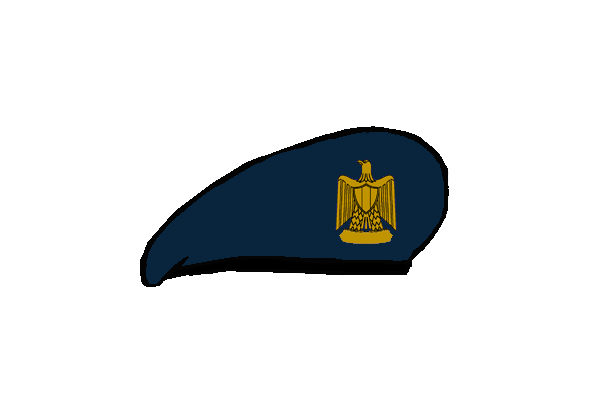
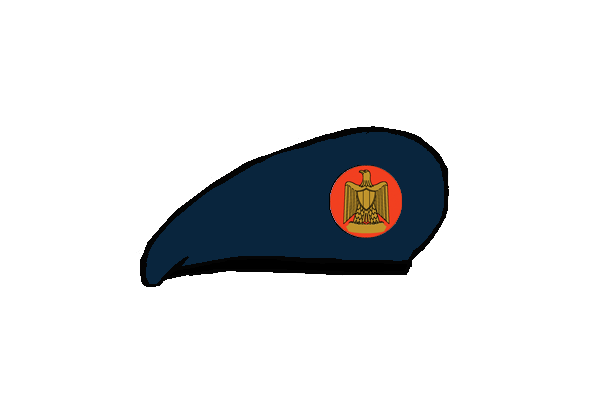
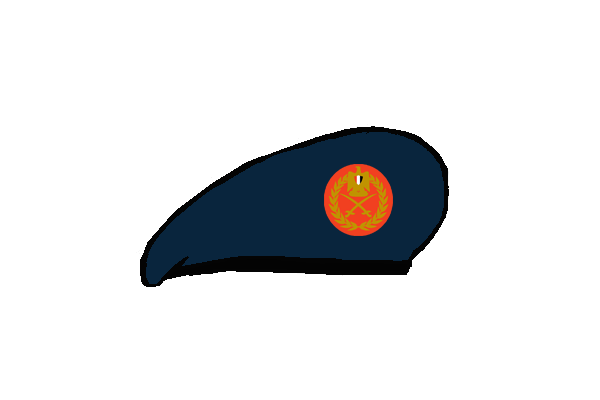
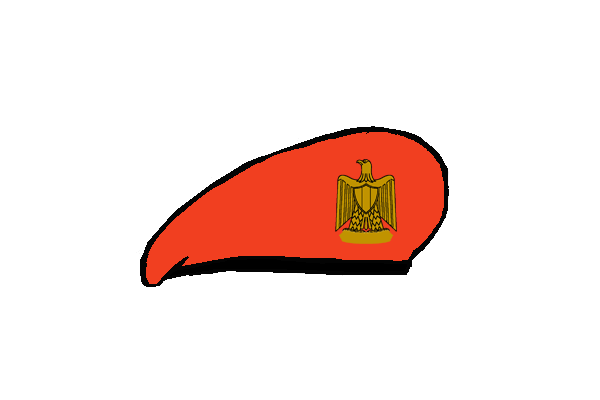
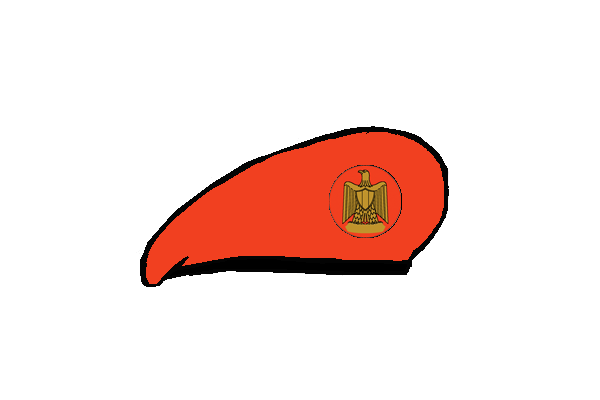
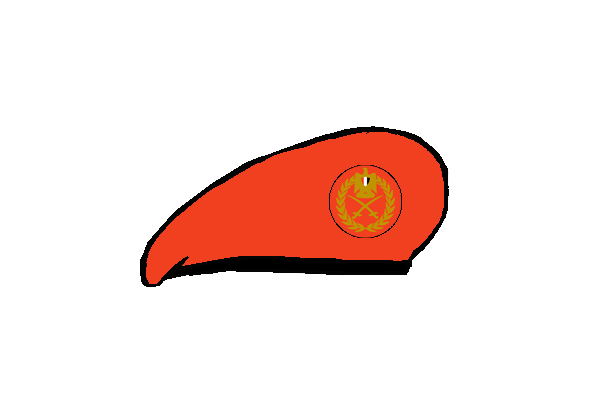
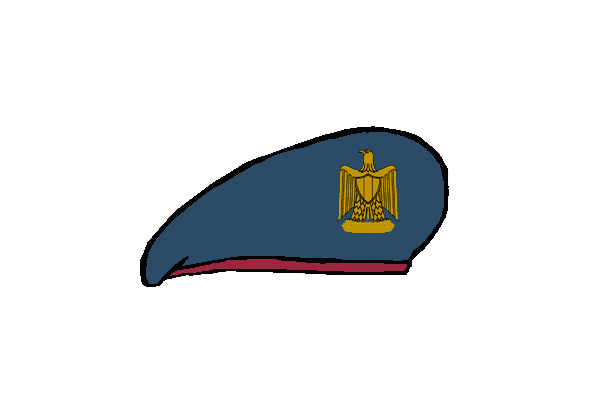
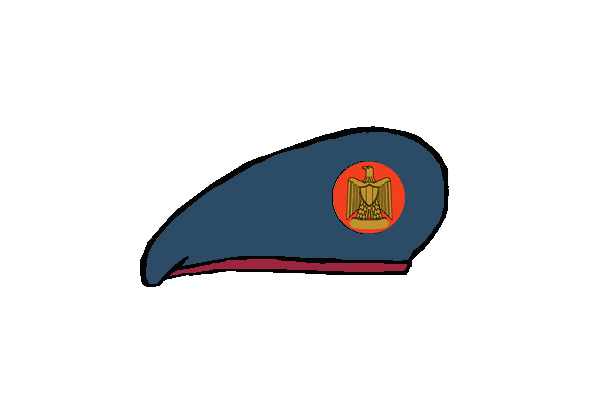
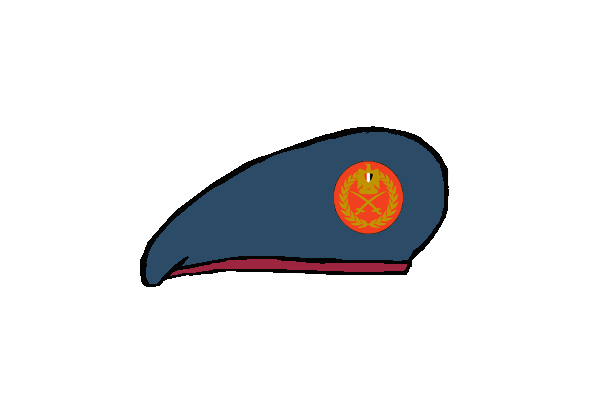
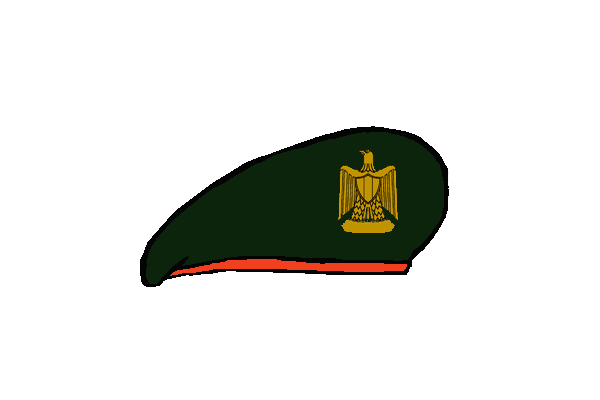
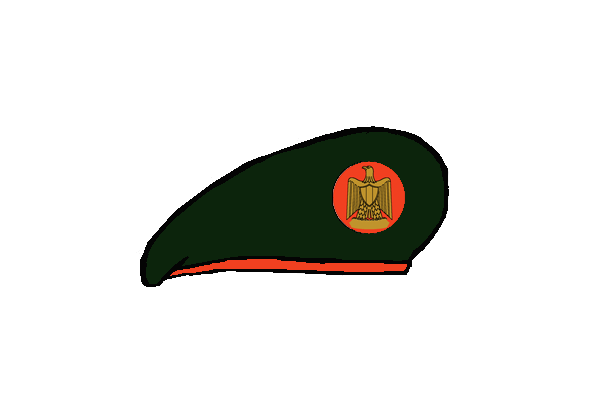
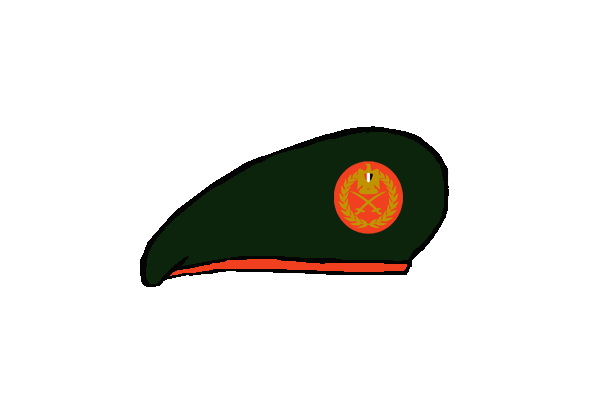
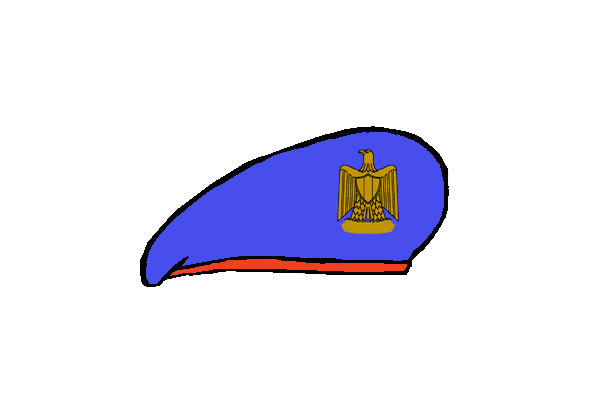
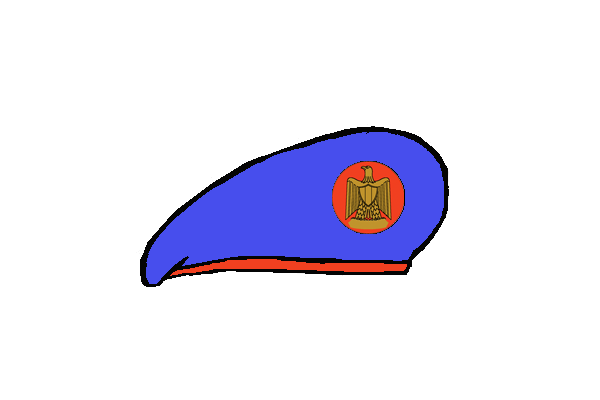
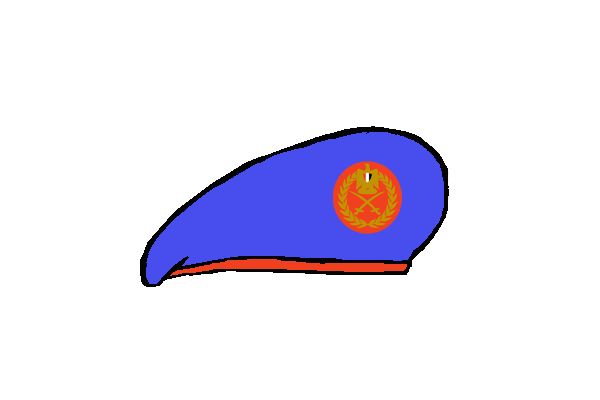
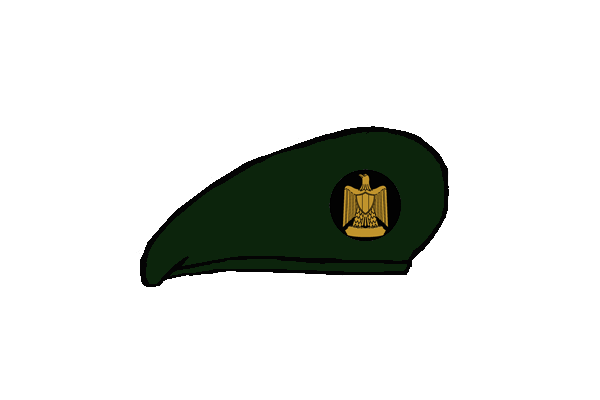
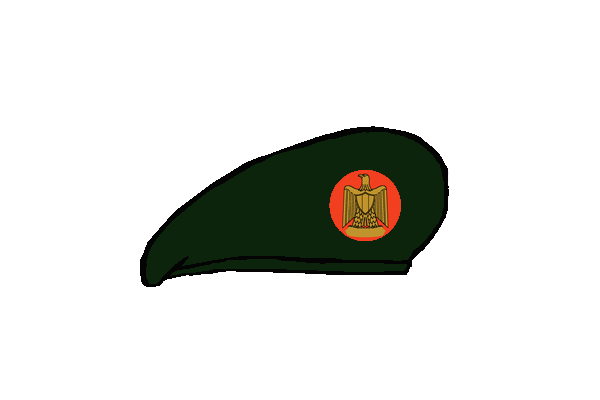
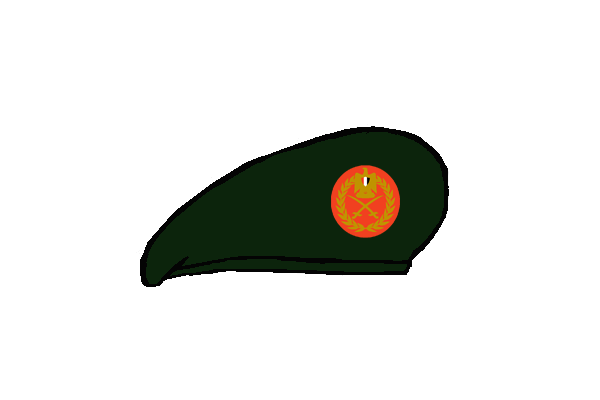
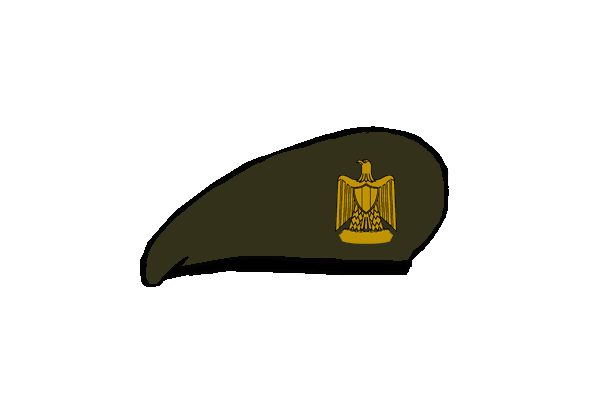
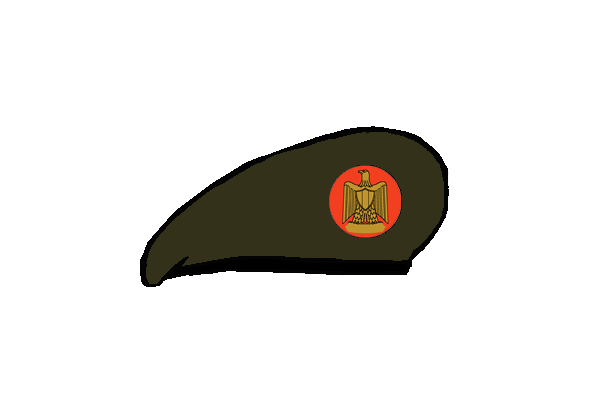
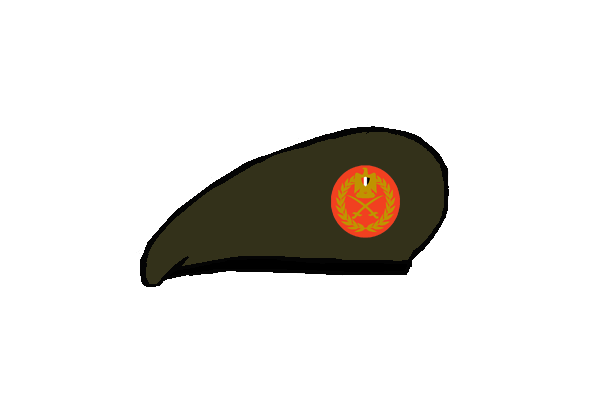
Branch	Beret
Branch	Officer	Brigadier general	General
Airborne
Armored
Artillery
Border Guard
Infantry
Military Police
Moral affairs
Reconnaissance
Republican Guard
Thunderbolt
Rest

== Uniform accouterments ==
Badges and accouterments may be worn on service and ceremonial uniforms based on the following awards -

- Master Freefall Parachutist
- Airborne Paratrooper/Parachutist
- Airmobile Soldier
- Air Assault Soldier
- Aviation Wings (Transport)
- Aviation Wings (Helicopter)
- Aviation Wings (Fighter-Bomber)
- Aviation Wings (Qualified Paradropping)
- Fighter Ace
- Combat Helicopter Ace
- Bomber & Close Air Support Ace
- Artillery Aerial Observation Pilot
- Forward Air Observer
- Forward Ground Observer
- Master Artillery Observation Officer
- Master Tank Gunner
- Master Tank Driver
- Master Tank Commander
- Excellent Tank Troop & Squadron Commander
- Excellent Infantry & Special Forces Company Commander
- Excellent in Combat Battalion Command
- Master Sniper Class 1
- Master Sniper Class 2
- Expert Infantry Marksman Class 1
- Expert Infantry Marksman Class 2
- Anti-Tank Missile Master Gunner
- Anti-Tank Missile Ace Gunner
- Master Sapper Class 1
- Master Sapper Class 2
- Excellent Sapper Officer
- Higher Formations' General Staff officer
- Field Army General Staff Officer
- Staff College Professor
- Military Academies Professor
- Completed Command & Staff Postgraduate Course

== See also ==
- Egyptian Army ranks
- Comparative military ranks
- Egyptian Air Force ranks
- Egyptian Navy ranks
- Egyptian Army
