= List of combat helmets =

Types of armor

== Ancient militaries ==
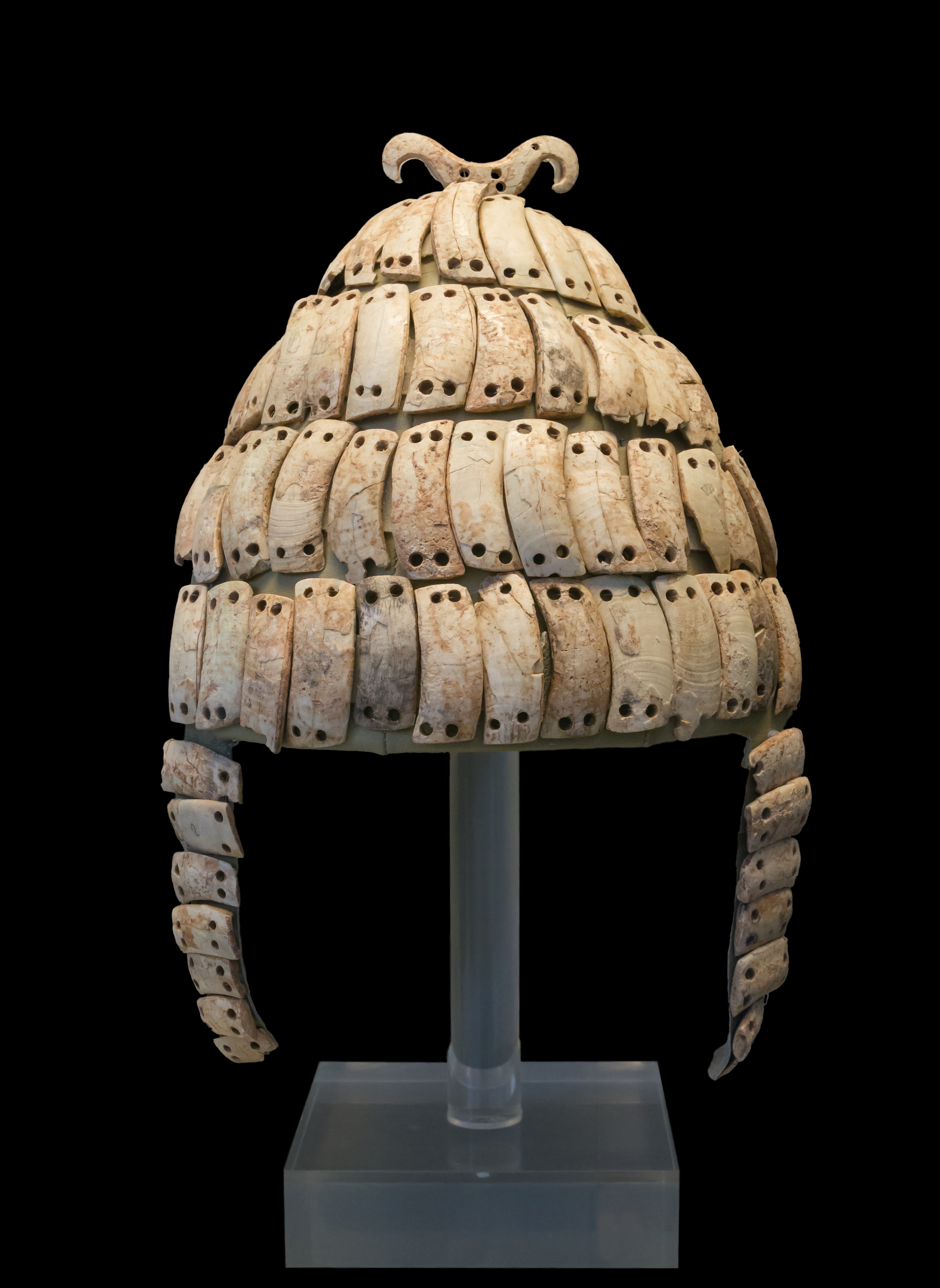
Mycenaean Greek boar tusk helmet, Mycenae, 14th century BC

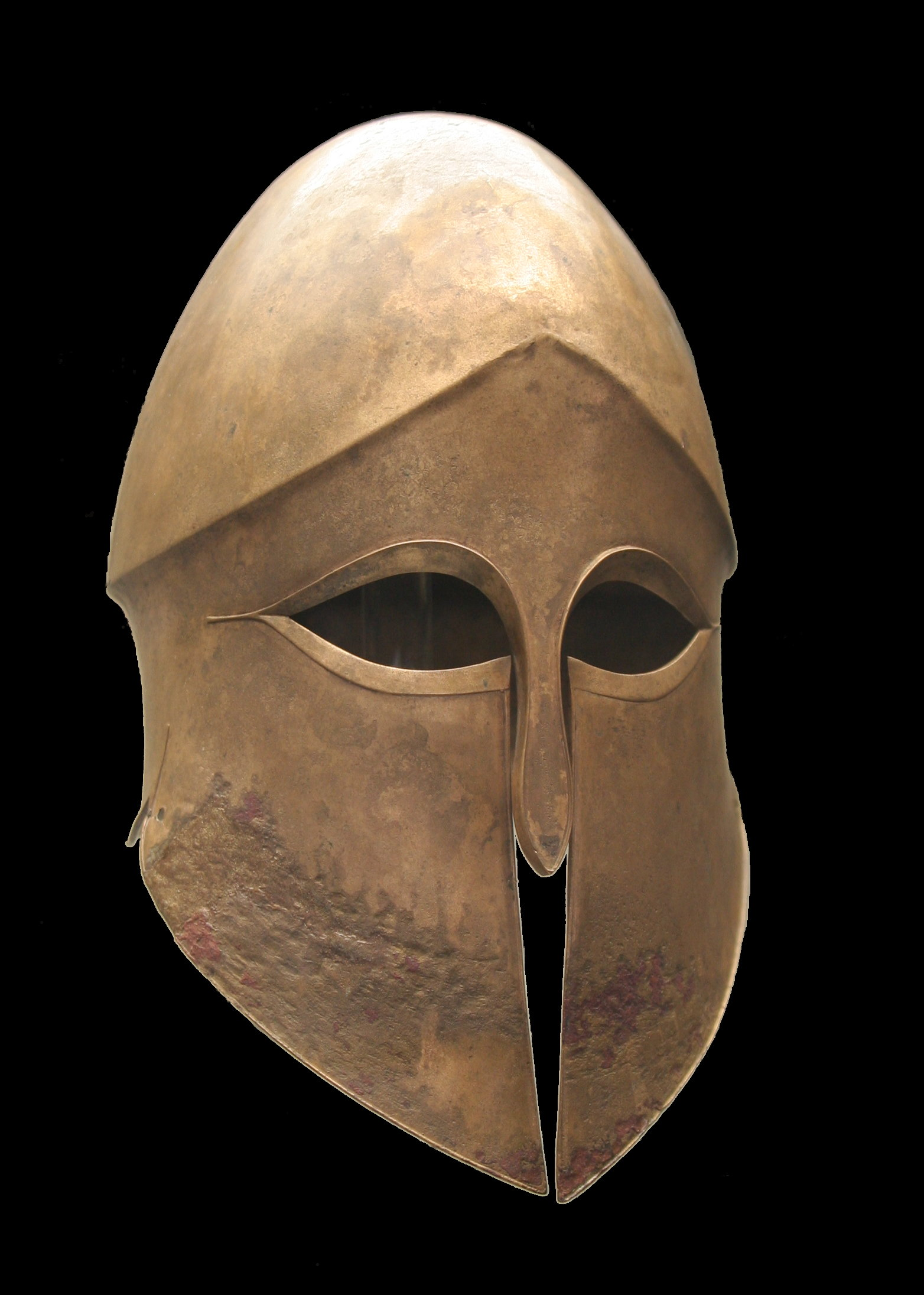
Ancient Greek bronze Corinthian helmet, c. 500 BC, Staatliche Antikensammlungen

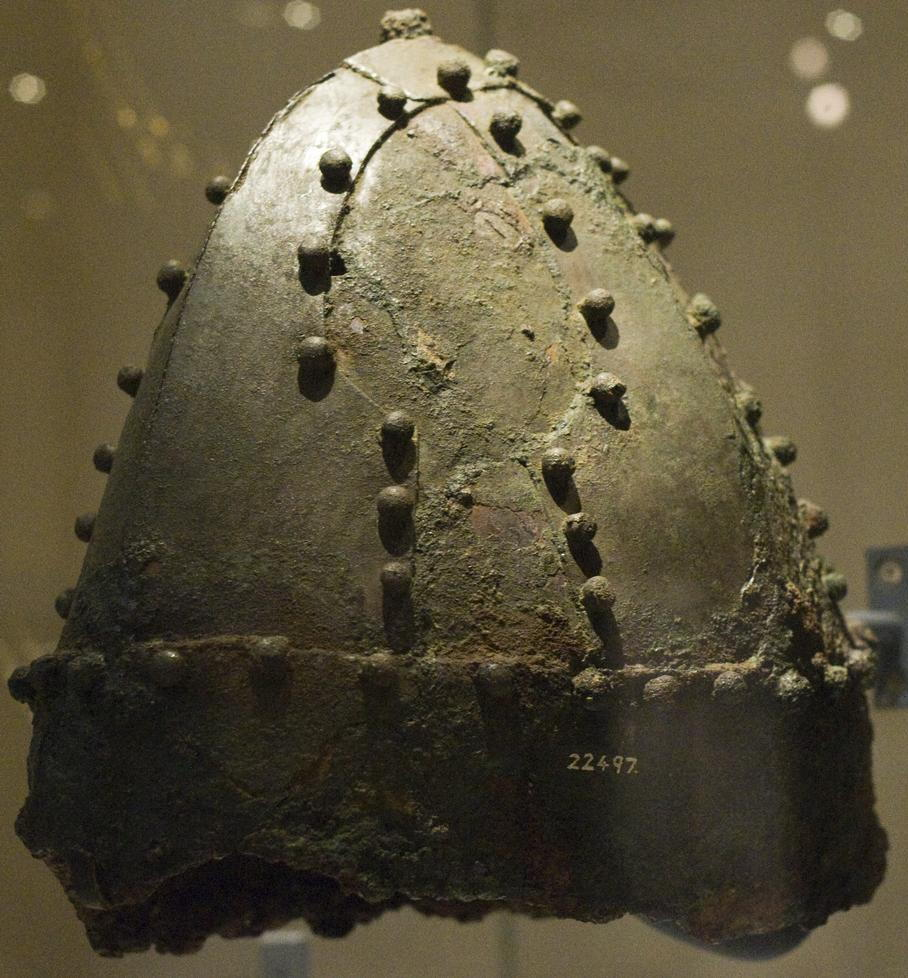
Persian helmet (Sassanid army)

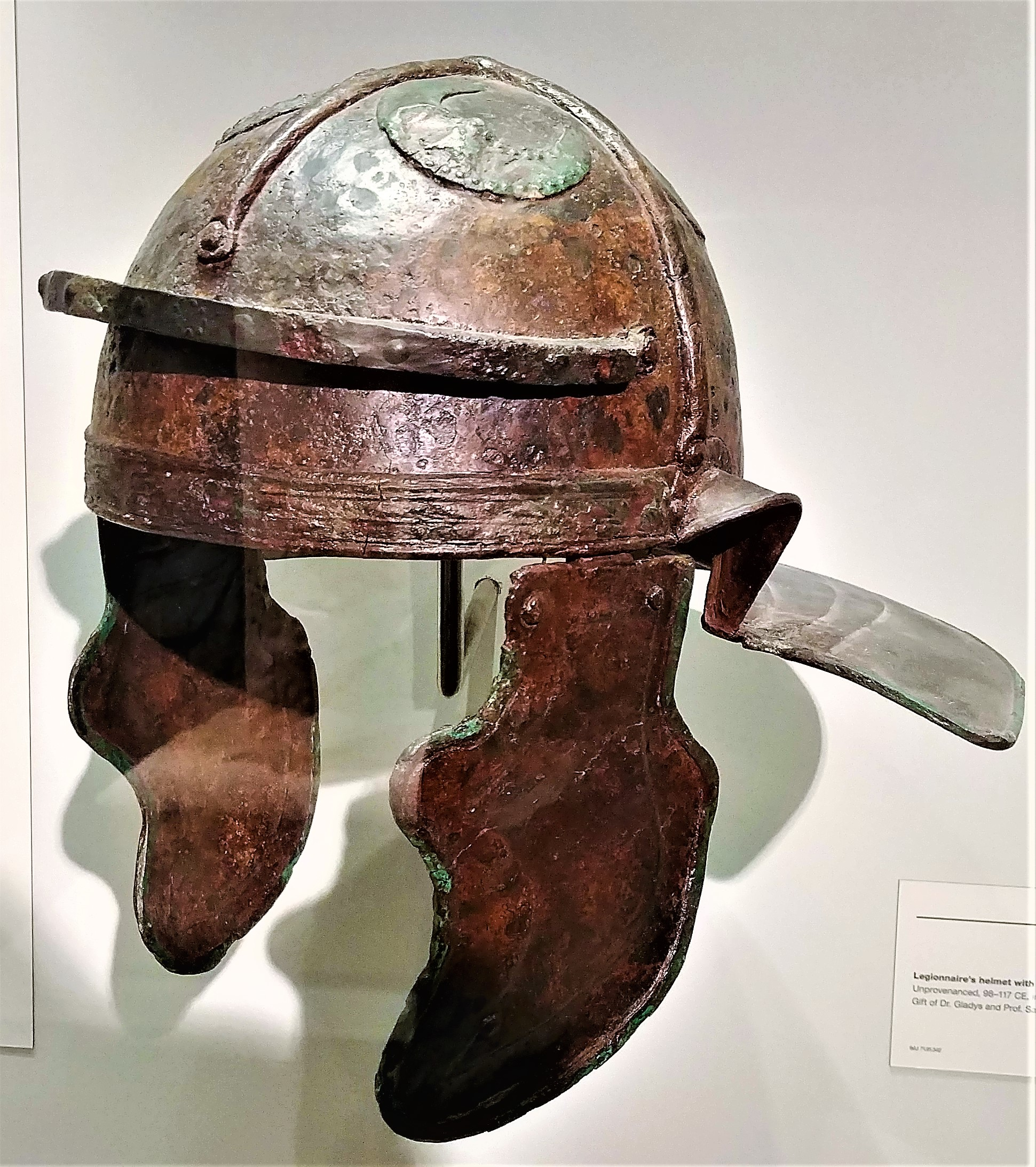
Roman legionary helmet - galea

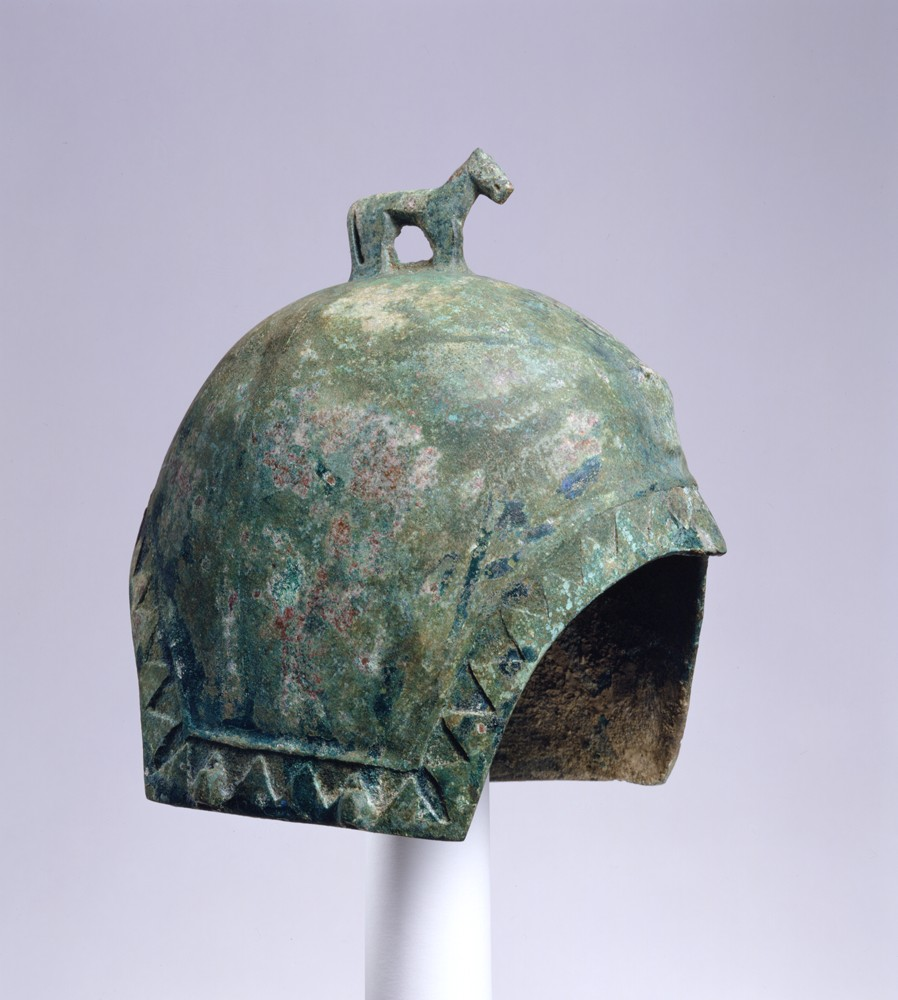
Ancient Chinese helmet from the Zhou dynasty

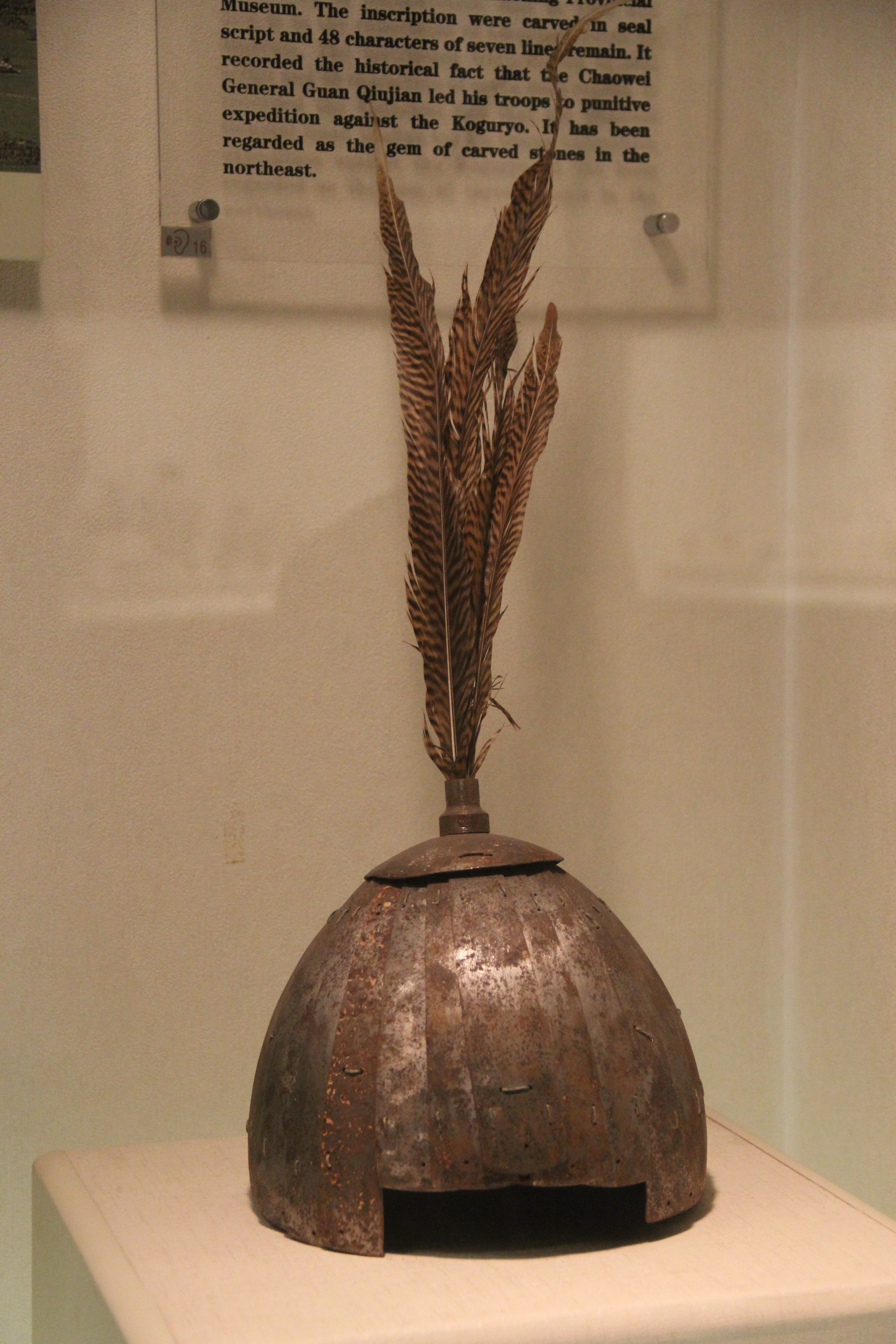
Imperial Chinese helmet from the Northern and Southern dynasties period

Model	Origin	Users
Attic helmet		ancient Greeks
Boar's tusk helmet	17th century BC	Mycenaean Greeks until the 10th century BC
Boeotian helmet		ancient Greek cavalry
Chalcidian helmet		ancient Greeks
Coolus helmet		ancient Romans
Corinthian helmet		ancient Greeks
Disc and stud helmet	c. 400 BC	ancient Illyrians & Adriatic Veneti until 167 BC
Galea (helmet)		ancient Romans
Horned helmet	c. 1000 BC	Celtic Europeans until 700 AD
Illyrian type helmet		ancient Greeks
Imperial helmet	1st century AD onwards	Roman Empire
Imperial Chinese helmet	1st century AD	imperial Chinese dynasties
Kegelhelm		ancient Greeks
Negau helmet		ancient Etruscans in Negau, Slovenia
Montefortino helmet		ancient Romans
Pilos		ancient Greeks
Pot helmet		ancient Illyrians
Phrygian/Thracian helmet	5th century BC	ancient Greeks in Thrace, Dacia, Italia & Hellenistic Europe until c. 200 AD
Zhou helmet	7th century BC	ancient Chinese in Zhou dynasty

== Medieval and early modern armies ==
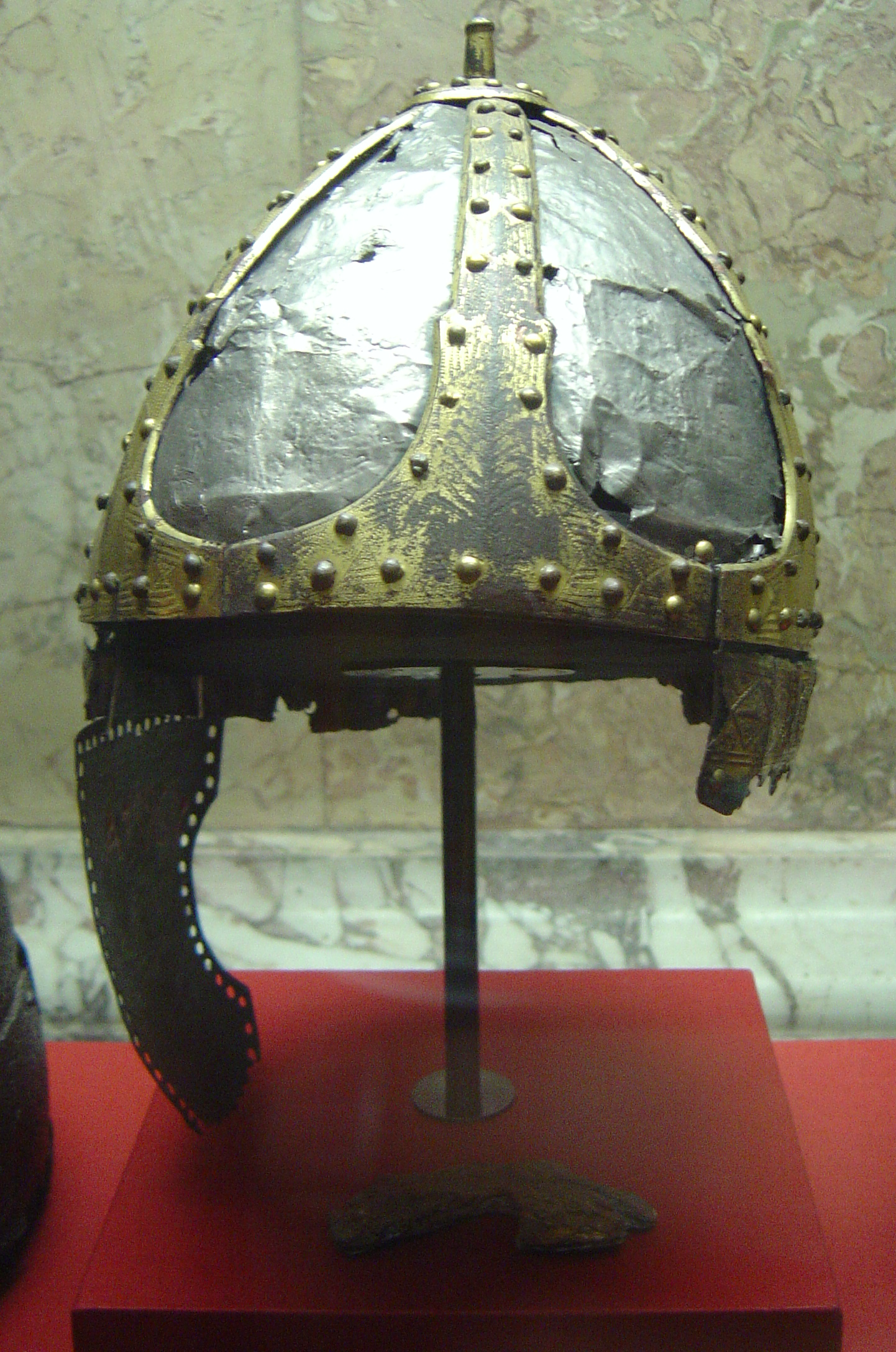
6th century Spangenhelm.

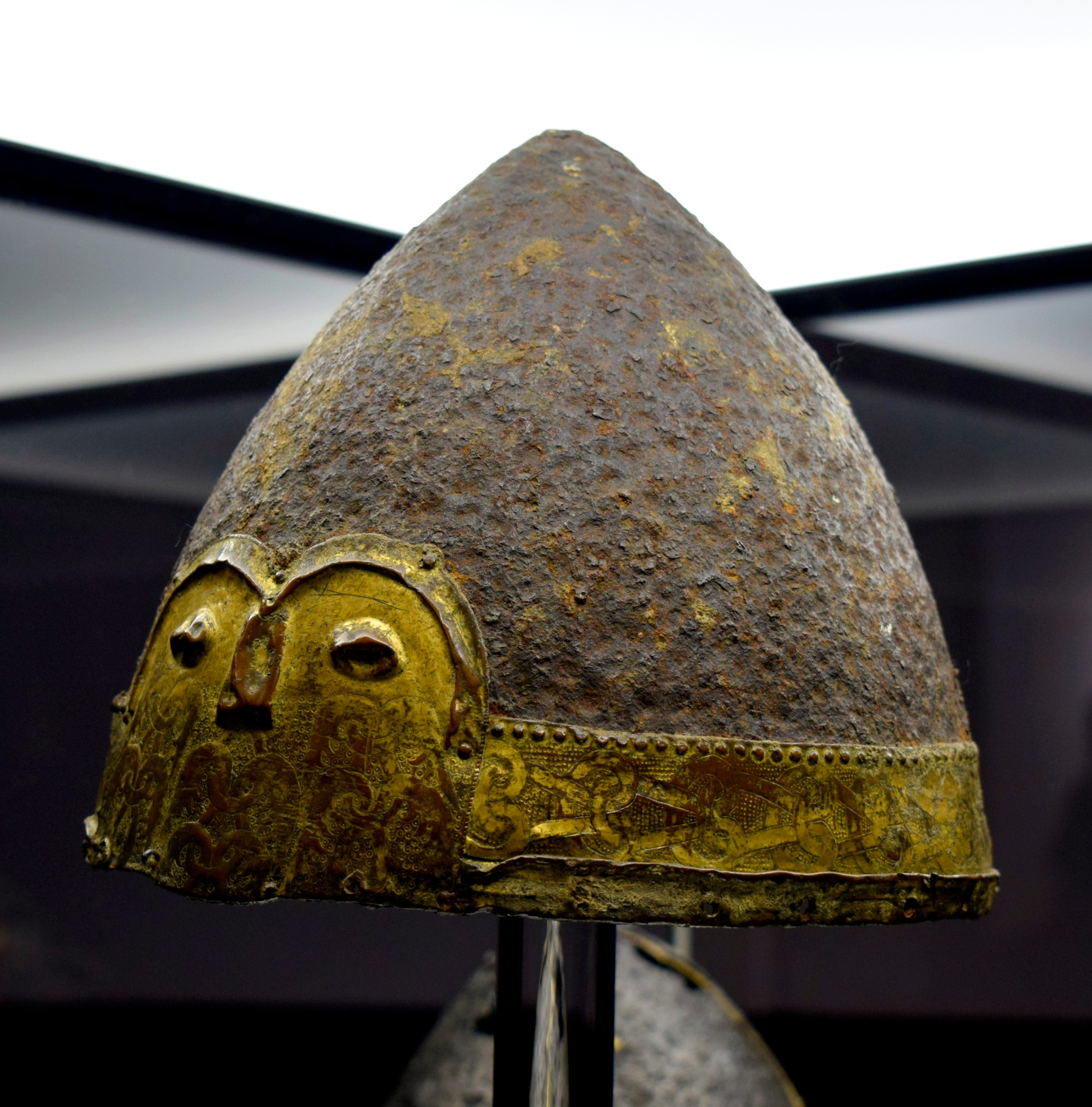
Eastern European conical helmet from the 11th century

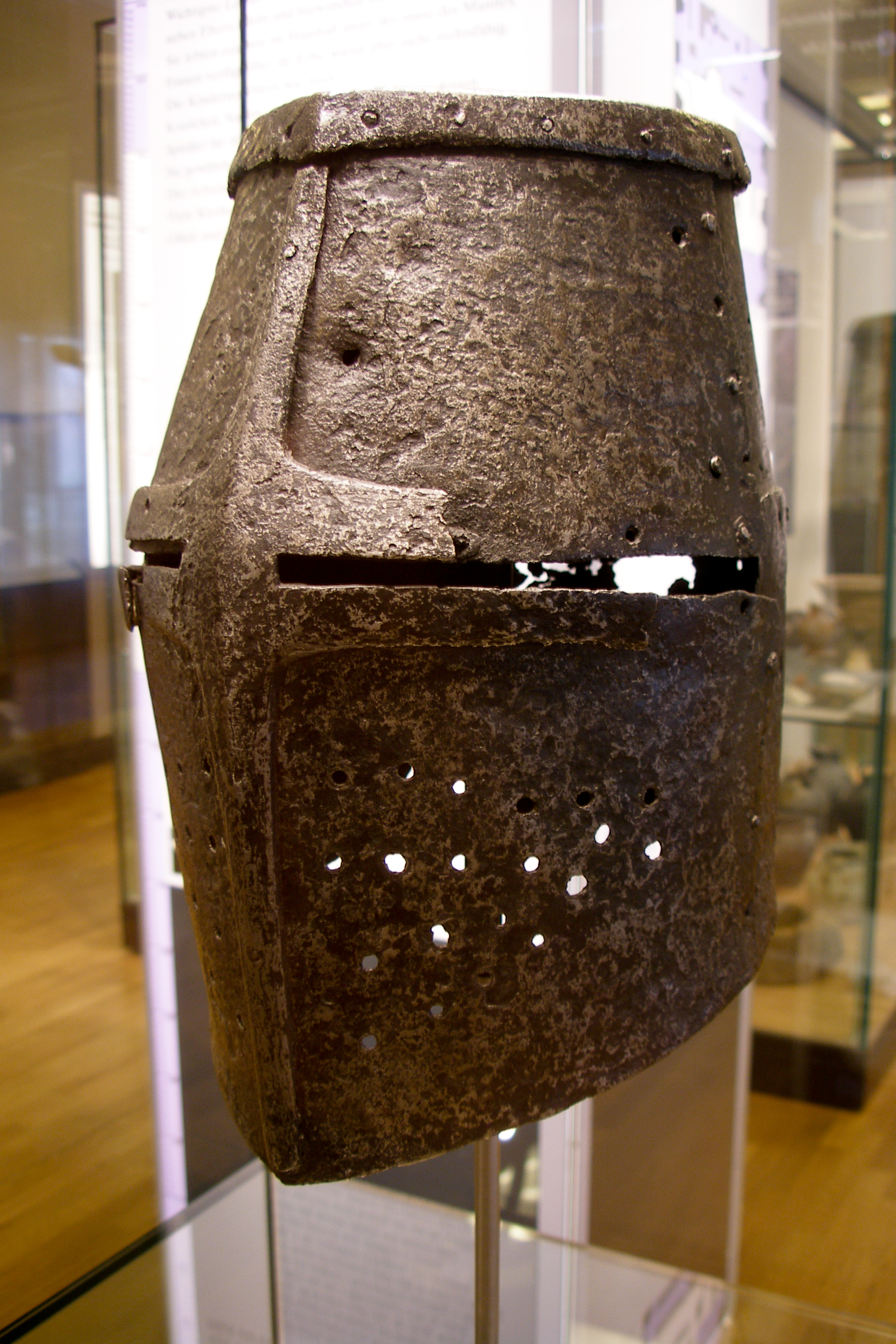
German great helm of the 12th or 13th century.

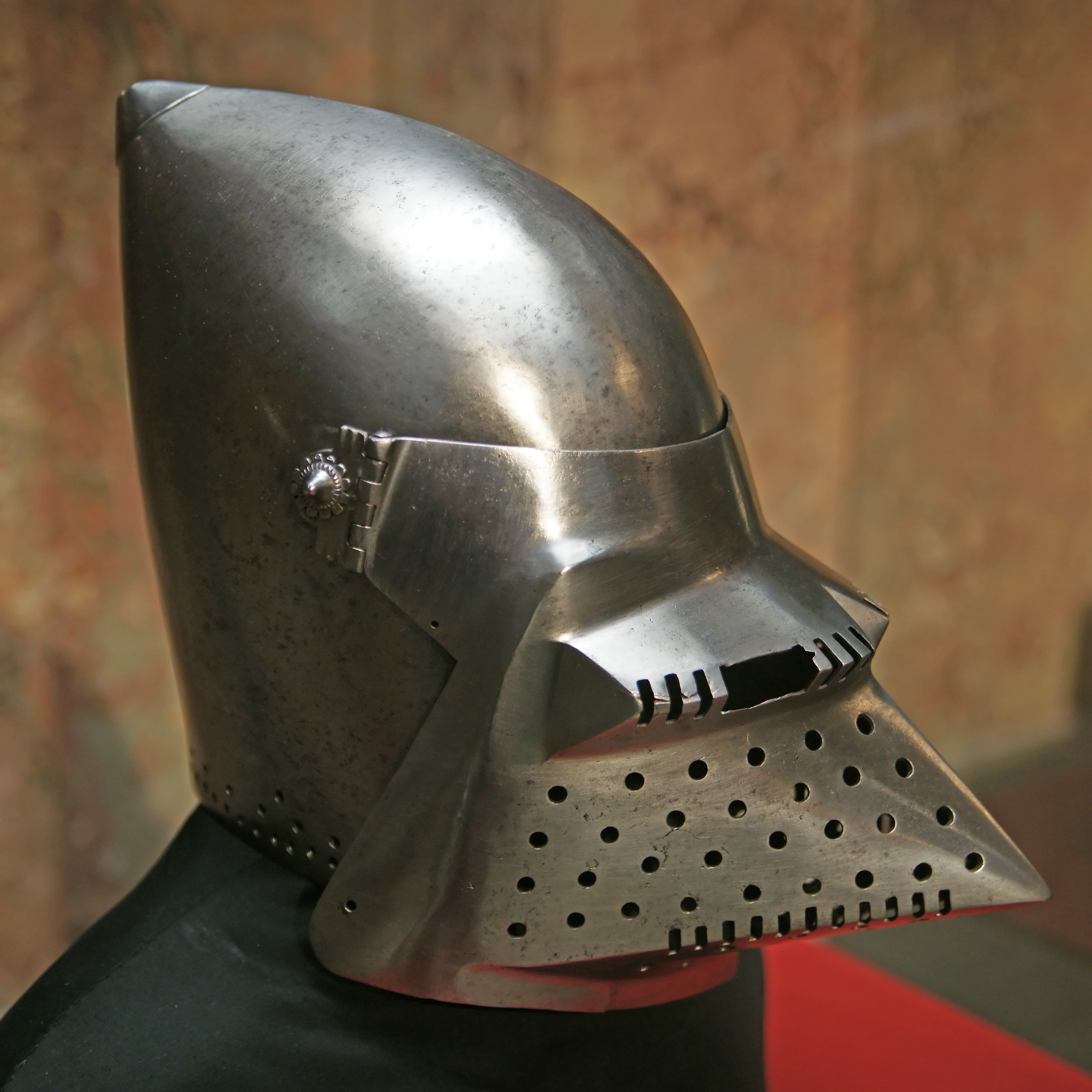
Italian bascinet from about 1400.

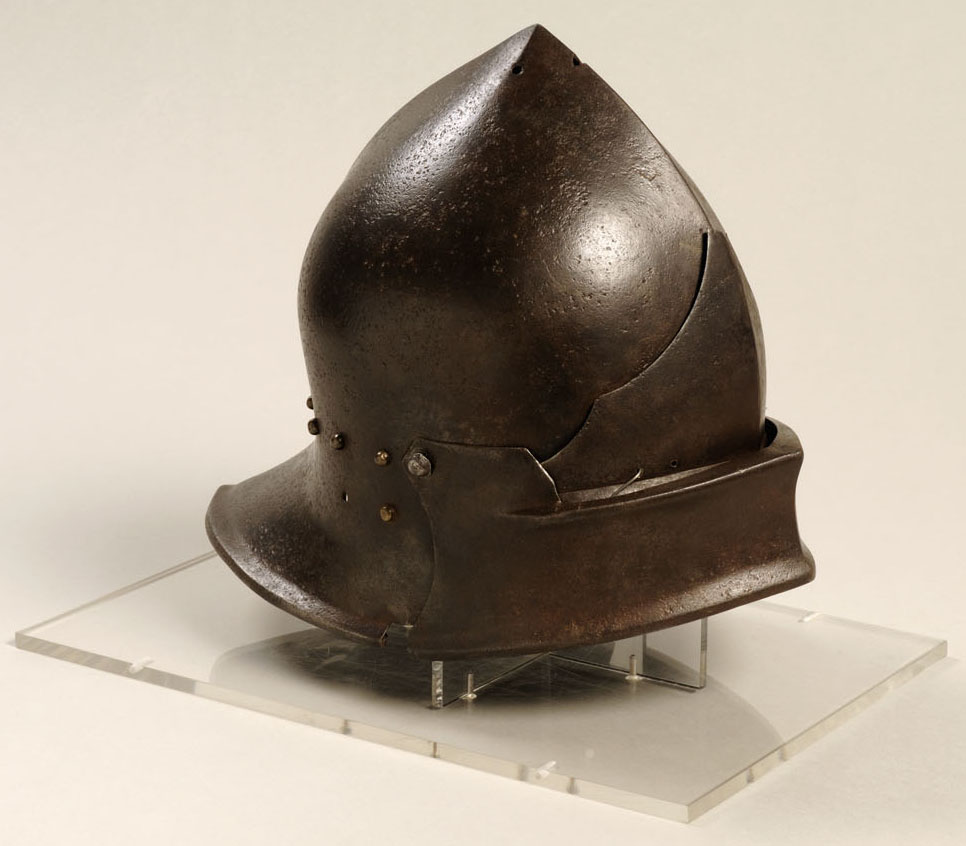
English sallet of the 15th century.

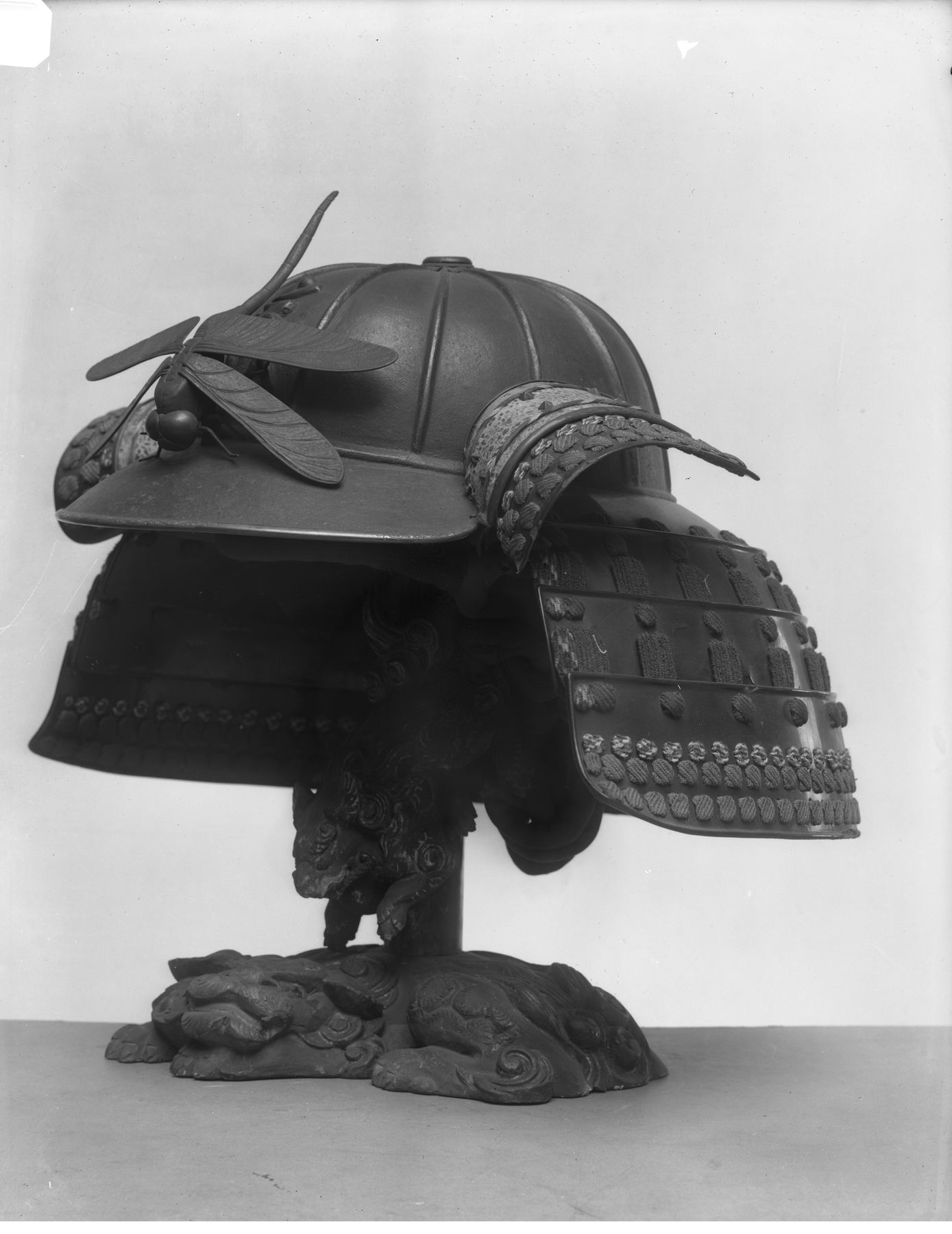
Japanese samurai helmet or kabuto; 15th or 16th century.

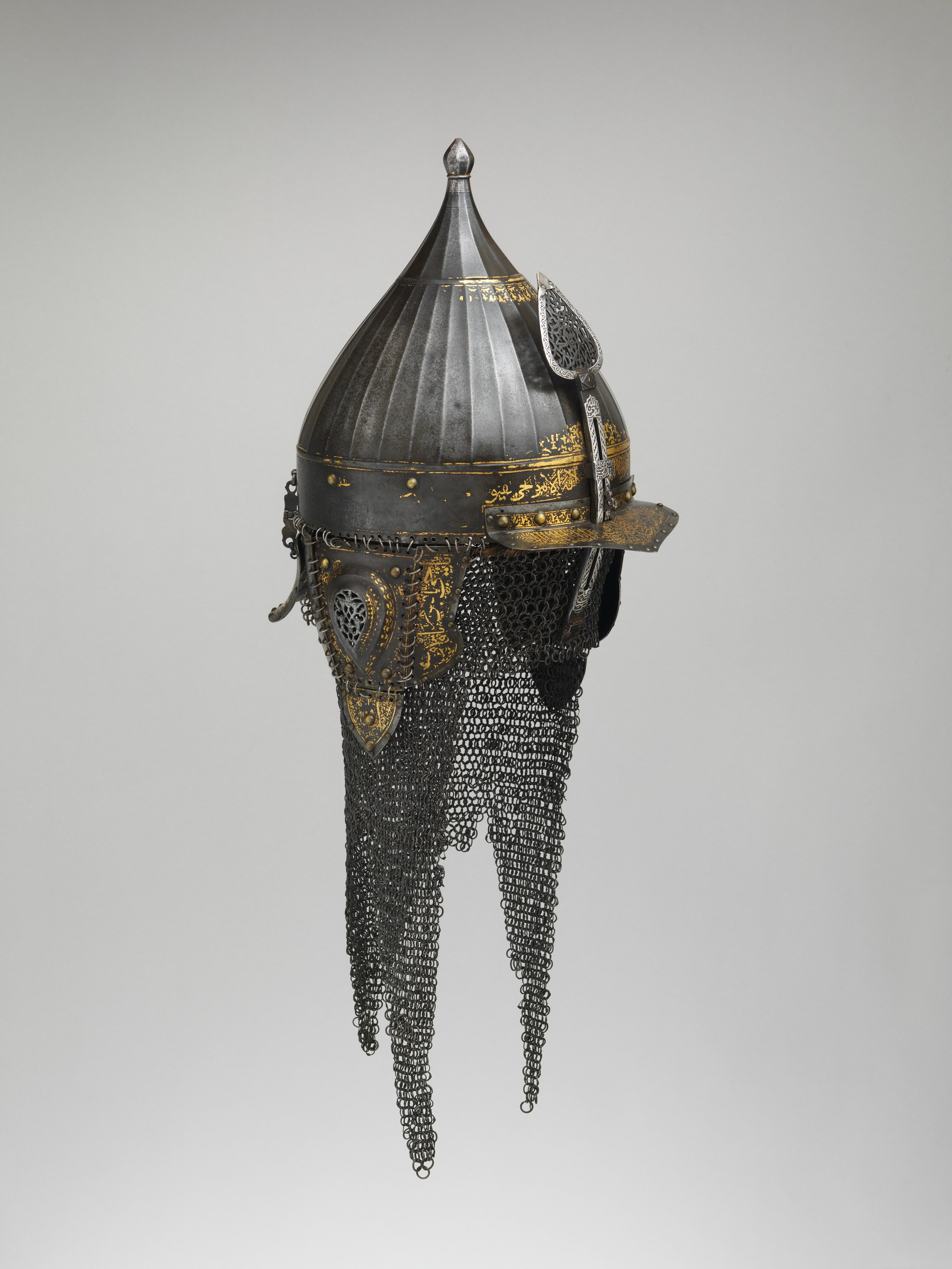
16th century Ottoman Zischägge.

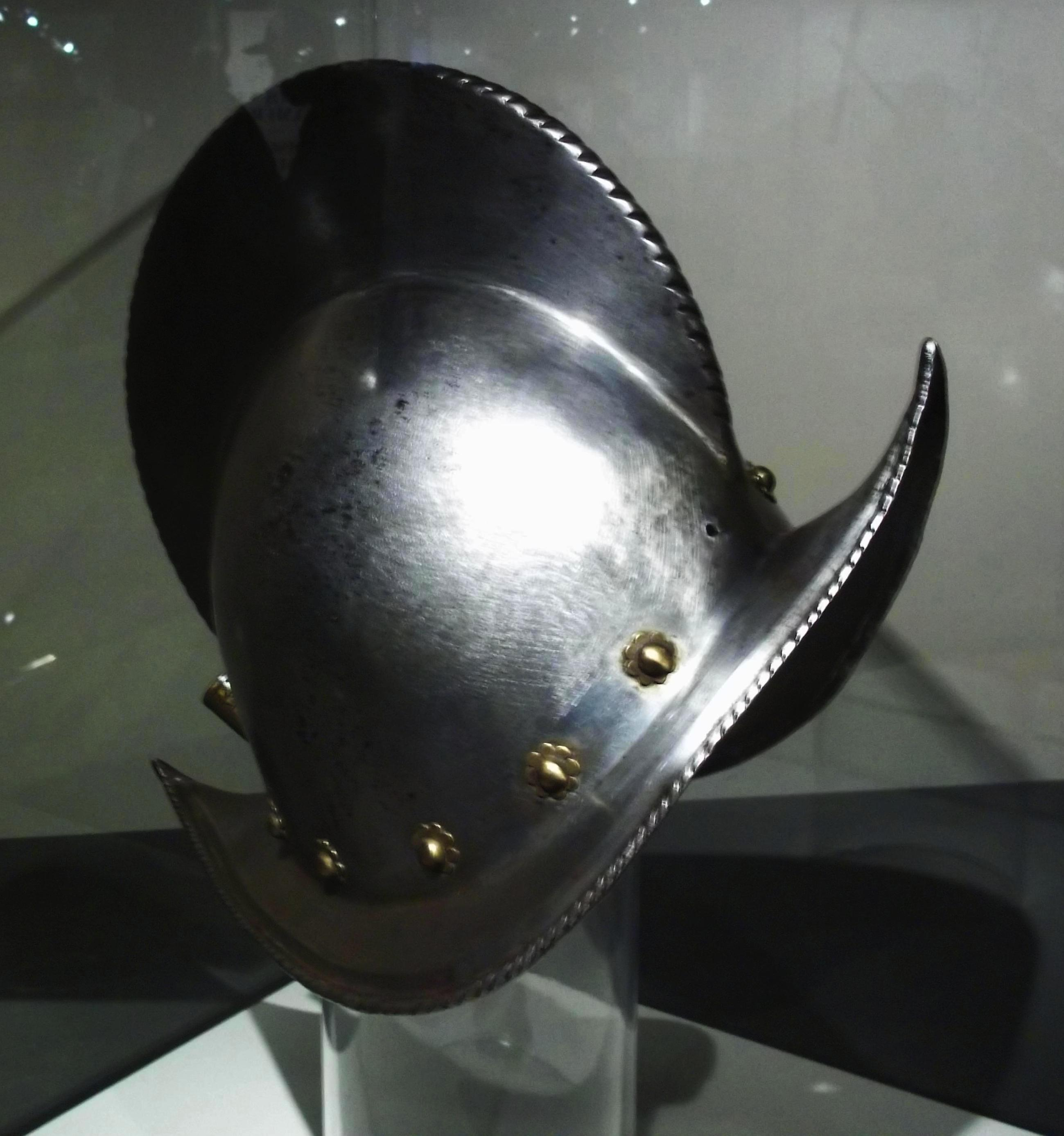
Spanish morion helmet, 17th century.

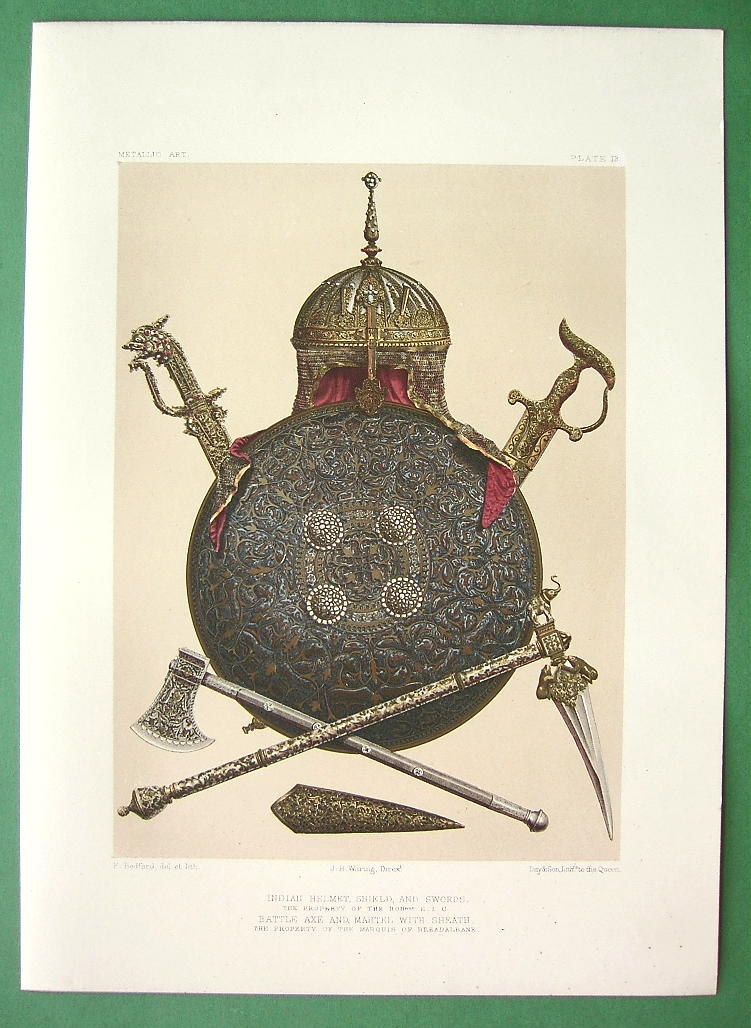
"Indian Helmet, Shield and Swords," a print by Day and Sons, London, c. 1858

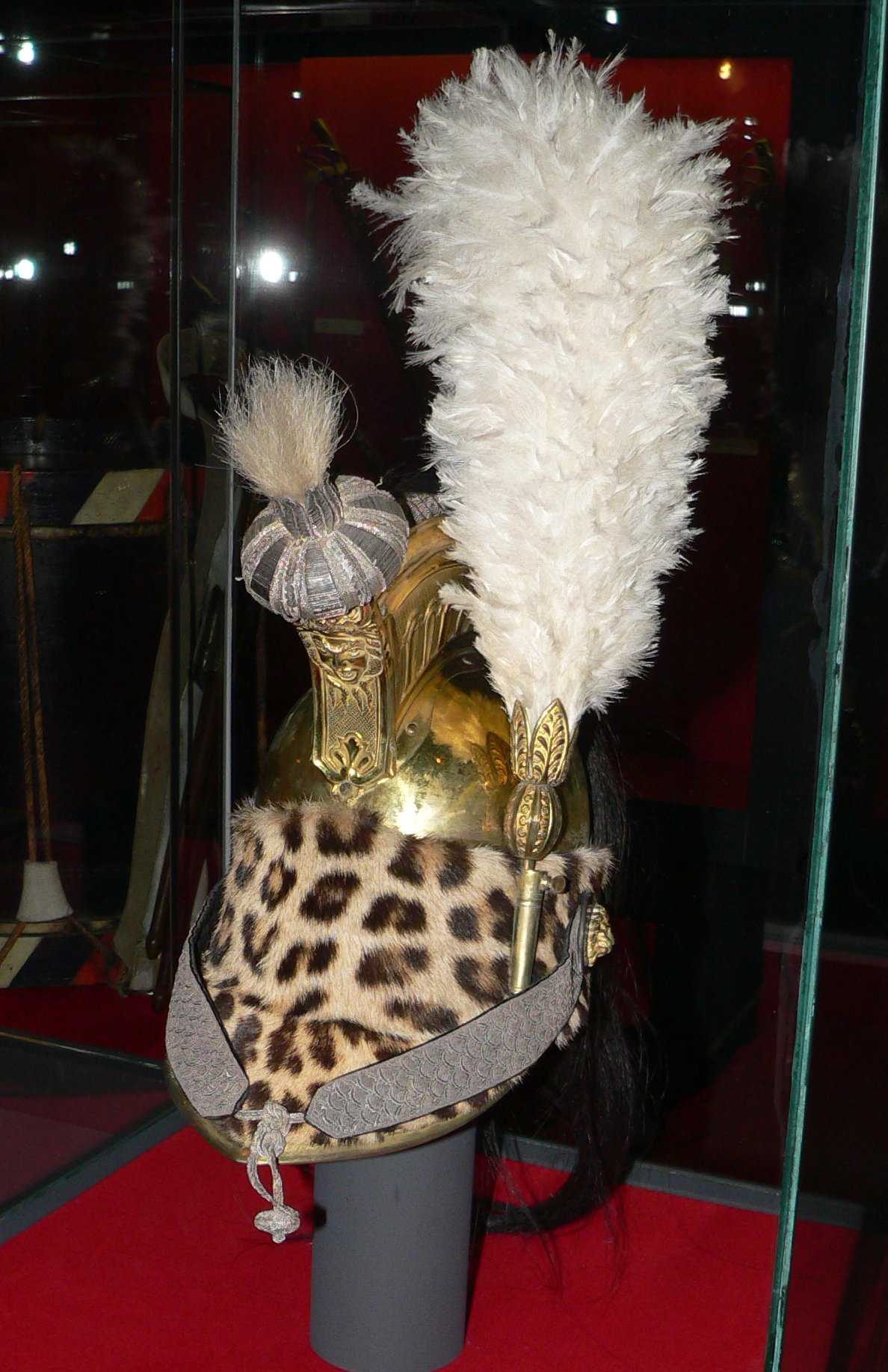
An early 19th century French officer's dragoon helmet.

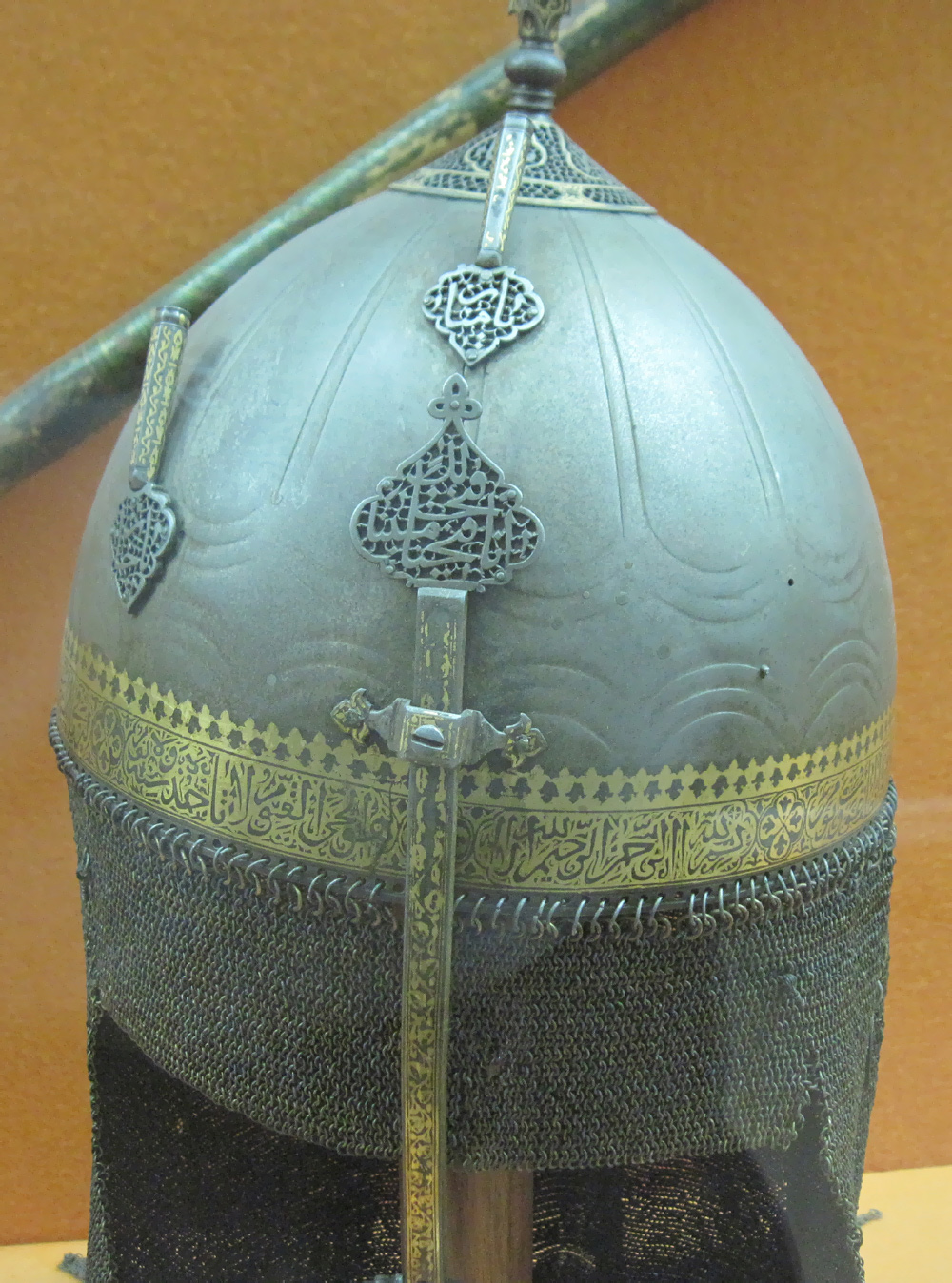
17th century Safavid helmet (Safavid army).

Model	Origin	Users
Armet	15th century	Western Europeans.
Barbute	15th century	Italian states.
Bascinet	c. 1300	Europeans
Burgonet	c. 1600	Europeans, especially by militias of Poland & Switzerland
Lobster-tailed pot Capeline; Zischägge	late 16th century	Europeans during the 17th century, including the English Civil War in England & Thirty Years' War across the Holy Roman Empire
Cervelliere	late 13th century	Christian Europeans in Crusades during the 14th century
Close helmet	late 15th century	Europeans.
Dragoon helmet	late 18th century	France.
Enclosed helmet	late 12th century	Western Europeans.
Frog-mouth helm	c. 1600	Europeans.
Great helm	1189	Europeans
Hounskull	14th century	Europeans.
Kabuto	c. 1600	Samurai especially during the 17th century of the Edo-period Tokugawa shogunate in Medieval Japan.
Kettle hat	12th century	Common all over medieval Europe.
Morion	16th and early 17th centuries	Europeans (esp. associated with Spanish Conquistadores)
Nasal helmet	Early Middle Ages	Byzantine Empire, later common all over Europe.
Pickelhaube	1842	especially by Prussia & German Empire and other Europeans until 1918
Raupenhelm	c. 1800–1870	High crested leather helmet used primarily by Kingdom of Bavaria and Kingdom of Württemberg
Sallet	c. 1450	Europeans
Secrete	17th century	Western Europeans
Spangenhelm	5th century	Central Asia, Near East & Europe; espec. by Scythians, Sarmatians, Persians, & Germans until 1000
Tarleton helmet	c. 1770–1800	Crested, peaked leather helmet used by cavalry and light infantry and British Royal Horse Artillery, France and United States in the late 18th and early 19th centuries
Turban helmet	14th century	Ottoman Empire
Qing parade helmet	after 1655 till 1911	China
Zischagge	c. 1600–1780	Originated in the Ottoman Empire; used throughout Europe

See also headgear listing within Components of medieval armour.

== 1914–1980 ==
Model	Image	Origins	First issued	Users
Adrian helmet		France	1915, 1926	France, Belgium, Russian Empire, Poland, Japan Imperial Japanese Navy Land Forces, Kingdom of Serbia, Kingdom of Yugoslavia, U.S., USSR, Irish Free State, Kingdom of Italy, Republic of China, Manchukuo, Peru, Finland, Romania, Mexico, Greece, Uruguay, Thailand, Brazil, Ukrainian People's Republic Belarusian People's Republic
Modèle 1951		France	1951	France, South Vietnam, South Africa, Cambodia, Laos, Lebanon, Israel, Portugal, Rhodesia
Modèle 1978		France	1978	France, Senegal
Brodie helmet		UK	1915, 1938	UK, Canada, U.S. (1917–1942), Australia, Republic of China, Pakistan, Poland (Polish Armed Forces in the West), Estonia, New Zealand, Sri Lanka, South Africa, India, the Netherlands, Portugal, Luxembourg, Philippines Ukrainian People's Republic Provisional Government of Free India Republic of Russia
Zuckerman helmet		UK	1940	"Civilian Protective Helmet"
Helmet Steel Airborne Troop		UK	1941	UK, Canada, Poland (Polish Armed Forces in the West), Belgium, Rhodesia
RAC helmet		UK	1941	Armoured vehicle crews: UK, Canada, Poland (Polish Armed Forces in the West), Belgium
Mk III "Turtle" helmet		UK	1944	UK, Canada
Mk IV helmet		UK	1945	UK, Canada
Stahlhelm		German Empire	1916, 1917, 1918	German Empire, Weimar Republic, Nazi Germany, Irish Free State, Poland, Estonia, Latvia, Lithuania, Finland
Stahlhelm M16		Austria-Hungary	1916	Austria-Hungary, German Empire, Weimar Republic, Poland, Austria, Nazi Germany, Finland
Stahlhelm M18 (Armoured warfare)		German Empire	1918	German Empire, Turkey, Weimar Republic
Stahlhelm M18 (Telephone and cavalry helmet)		German Empire	1918	German Empire, Weimar Republic, Nazi Germany
Stahlhelm M35		Nazi Germany	1935	Nazi Germany, Republic of China, China, Argentina, Chile, Colombia, Bolivia, Mexico, Estonia, Latvia, Lithuania, Poland (Home Army)
Stahlhelm M40		Nazi Germany	1940	Nazi Germany, Finland, Estonia, Latvia, Lithuania, Poland (Home Army)
Stahlhelm M42		Nazi Germany	1942	Nazi Germany, Hungary, Finland, Estonia, Latvia, Lithuania, Poland (Home Army)
Italian M16 Lippmann helmet		Italy	1916	Italy, Spain
M31 helmet		Italy	1931	Italy,
M33 helmet		Italy	1934	Italy, Finland,
Greek M1934/39 (helmet)		Italy	1939	Greece, Bulgaria
M42 helmet		Italy	1942	Italy
M1917 helmet		U.S.	1917	US, Philippines
M76 paratrooper helmet		United Kingdom	1976	British Armed forces Paratroopers and Airborne units
M1 helmet		U.S.	1941	USA, Mexico, Canada, Austria, Belgium, Czechoslovakia, Denmark, West Germany (1956-1992), Greece, Netherlands, Norway, Pakistan, Poland, Spain, Turkey, Republic of China, Egypt, Iran, Iraq, South Korea (Bangtan Helmet), Philippines (1944–1991), Singapore, Saudi Arabia, Thailand, Australia, New Zealand, Guatemala, Argentina, Brazil, Chile, Peru, Venezuela, Uruguay, South Vietnam
Swiss M1918, Swiss M1918/40		Switzerland	1918	Switzerland, Argentina
Swiss M1971		Switzerland	1971	Switzerland
Danish M1923 helmet		Denmark	1923	Denmark
Belgian M26/32		Belgium	1926	Belgium, Luxembourg, Thailand
Swedish M1926		Sweden	1926	Sweden, Finland, Norway
Swedish M1937		Sweden	1937	Sweden, Finland, Denmark, Estonia
Spanish M1921		Spain	1926 (?)	Spain
Spanish M1926		Spain	1930 (?)	Spain
Spanish M1934		Spain	?	Spain
M1942 Modelo Z		Spain	?	Spain
M1942/79 Modelo Z		Spain	?	Spain
Netherlands M23/27, Netherlands M34		Netherlands	1928	Netherlands, Romania
Hełm wz. 28		Poland	1928	Poland
Hełm wz. 30		Poland	1930	Poland
Hełm wz. 31		Poland	1931	Poland, Nazi Germany, Soviet Union, Finland
Hełm wz. 31/50		Poland	1945	Poland
Hełm wz. 50		Poland	1950	Poland, Albania, Egypt, Syria, Iraq, North Vietnam, Israel, Croatia
Hełm wz. 63 (Paratrooper helmet)		Poland	1963	Poland, East Germany, Iraq
Hełm wz. 64		Poland	1964	Poland
Hełm wz. 65		Poland	1964	Poland
Hełm wz. 67		Poland	1967	Poland, Egypt, Ukraine, Syria, Afghanistan
Hełm wz. 70		Poland	1967	Poland
Irish M1927		Ireland	1927	Ireland
Norwegian M31		Sweden	1931	Norway
Type 90 (also called: Type 30–32, Type 92)		Japan	1931	Japan, Thailand, China
Type 66		Japan	1966	Variant of M1 Helmet used by some elements of the JSDF Ground Forces
Czechoslovak M32 helmet		Czechoslovakia	1932	Czechoslovakia, Nazi Germany, Protectorate of Bohemia and Moravia, Slovak Republic, Finland
Czechoslovak M53 helmet		Czechoslovakia	1953	Czechoslovakia
Hungarian M35		Hungary	1935	Hungary
Hungarian M38		Hungary	1938	Hungary, Finland
Hungarian M50		Hungary	1950	Hungary
Hungarian M70		Hungary	1970	Hungary
SSh-36		Soviet Union	1936	Soviet Union
SSh-39		Soviet Union	1939	Soviet Union, Poland
SSh-40		Soviet Union	1940	Soviet Union (Warsaw Pact), Poland, People's Republic of China, North Korea, North Vietnam, Finland, Afghanistan
SSh-60		Soviet Union	1960	Soviet Union (Warsaw Pact), Afghanistan
SSh-68		Soviet Union	1968	Soviet Union (Warsaw Pact), Afghanistan, Syria (Russian army, Afghanistan Army, Armenian Army, Azerbaijan Army, Belarus Army, Georgia Army, Moldova Army, Nicaragua Army, Philippines (Army reservists), Syrian Army, Ukraine Army, Uzbekistan Army, Vietnam Army)
Bulgarian M36 helmet		Bulgaria	1936	Bulgaria
Portuguese M1940		Portugal	1940	Portugal
M42 Duperite helmet (Paratrooper helmet)		Australia	1942	Australia
Mº 44 E.T.A. de Paracaidista used by Argentine Paratroopers		Argentina	1944	Argentina
M63 Staaldak		South Africa	1963	Rhodesia, South Africa
US Navy Mk II talker helmet		U.S.	1942	US
M59/85		Yugoslavia	1958	Yugoslavia, Serbia and Montenegro, Croatia, Republika Srpska, Macedonia, Serbia

== 1980–present ==
Model	Image	Origins	First Issued	Users	Notes
6B26		Russia	2006	Russian Armed Forces	Part of Ratnik infantry system
6B27		Russia	2006	Russian Armed Forces	Part of Ratnik infantry system
6B28		Russia	2006	Russian Airborne Forces	Part of Ratnik infantry system
6B47		Russia	2013	Russian Armed Forces, Syrian Army	Part of Ratnik infantry system
6B7		Russia	1998	Russian Army, Syrian Army	This helmet and its variants are the standard-issue headgear of the Russian army, they also are replacing older helmets like the SSh-68; Part of Ratnik infantry system
6B7-1L		Russia		Russian Army and Russian Navy naval infantry	Part of Ratnik infantry system
Advanced Combat Helmet (ACH)		United States	2002	US Army	Developed from the Modular Integrated Communications Helmet
ASELSAN ZAMBAK		Turkey	2012	Turkish Armed Forces and Gendarmerie General Command	
BH A-140/150		Pakistan		Pakistan Armed Forces	GIDS ballistic helmets. BH A-140 is 1.36kg while BH A -150 is 1.50kg in weight.
BK-3 Helmet		Croatia		Croatian Army, Swedish Army, German Army, Kuwaiti Army, French Army, Singapore Army, Israel Army, Saudi Arabian Army, Polish Armed Forces, Australian Army, Turkish Armed Forces, Czech Army, Bulgarian Army, United Arab Emirates Army, Lithuanian Armed Forces, Mexican Army, Spanish Army, Pakistan Army, Malaysian Army, Saudi Arabian Army, Finnish Army, National Army of Colombia, Armed Forces of the Republic of Kazakhstan, Indonesian Army, Italian Army, Military of Hungary, Armed Forces of the Argentine Republic, People's Liberation Army and by the police forces of the following countries: Croatia, Turkey, UK, Spain, North Macedonia, Egypt, Russia, Saudi Arabia, Turkey, Colombia, Italy, Ukraine, by Argentina and by the UN demining committee.	Gefechtshelm M92-style helmet produced by Šestan-Busch made from Aramid fibre, with antiballistic protection level IIIA according to NIJ 0106.01 and antiballistic protection v50≥ 650 m/s according to STANAG 2920. As with the German M92, the BK-3 comes with a three-point chin strap. The BK-3 replaced the Šestan-Busch BK-9 which was the first Croatian version of the Gefechtshelm M92 except it used the original US PASGT suspension head system.
BK-6		Mexico		Mexican Army	Kevlar helmet, adopted in the 2000s (decade). used in conjunction supplementation role with the PASGT. – Imported helmet.
BK-ACH Helmet		Croatia		Croatian Army	ACH shape helmet produced by Šestan-Busch, alternative to BK-3
CABAL II		Argentina		Argentine Army Infantry	PASGT style ballistic helmet M-6 for Argentine Infantry Approved by CITEFA NIJ Level II according to the standards currently in stage R3B certified to MIL-Std 662 E. However it wasn't issued in large scales.
Capacete Combate Ballistico (CCB)		Brazil		Brazilian Armed Forces	US PASGT-shape helmet in two versions: Polymer and Kevlar.
CG634		Canada	1997	Canadian Forces	Canadian variant of the French Gallet F2 SPECTRA helmet similar to the US Military MICH 2000/ACH helmet (in that it has no peak) but with the US PASGT/French F2 helmet suspension system. Issued in 1997.
Cobra Plus Combat Helmet		United States	2013	Danish Army and British Forces	
Enhanced Combat Helmet (Australia)		Israel	2004 (Australia); 2009 (NZ)	Australian Defence Force, New Zealand Defence Force	The RBH 303AU model was made specially for the ADF, replacing the M91 PASGT helmet. MICH 2000 style helmet made by Rabintex, Israel Was adopted by NZDF from 2009 to 2019
Enhanced Combat Helmet (ECH)		United States.	2012		Designed as an upgrade to the Advanced Combat Helmet. Uses thermoplastics instead of ballistic fibers.
EXFIL Ballistic Helmet		United States	2016	Australian Defence Force	Tiered Combat Helmet (TCH) forms part of the Soldier Combat Ensemble and includes a unique rail system and a night vision mount.
Gefechtshelm Schuberth B826 (M92)		Germany	1992	Bundeswehr, Austrian Federal Police, Bahrain Defence Force M1 helmet-based suspension system., Belgian military, Czech Army under license as the Petris P-3001, Danish Army, Dutch Army, Estonian Defence Forces, Norwegian Army, Swiss Armed Forces	PASGT type helmet with a sloping peak, rather than the defined peak of the US PASGT helmet. Has a 3-point retention strap system.
Gefechtshelm Schuberth B828 Airborne and B828 Tactical Cut		Germany		Limited use by the paratroops in Bundeswehr like Fallschirmjäger, Spezialisierte Kräfte des Heeres mit Erweiterter Grundbefähigung für Spezielle Operationen and Kommando Spezialkräfte (KSK) –	MICH 2000 and MICH 2001 type helmets
GK80		People's Republic of China	1980	People's Liberation Army, Albania	
GOLFO		Chile	2000	Military of Chile	Chilean PASGT-derived helmet. The helmet is locally made by Baselli Hermanos S.A of kevlar and was introduced in 2000. It is capable of stopping a 9×19mm round at 310m.
Hełm wz. 2005		Poland	2005	Polish Armed Forces, Armed Forces of Ukraine	Supplementing the older Helm wz. 93 currently in use. PASGT-type helmet. The 2005 version, made by MASKPOL, came with a 4-point chin strap. The earlier Helm Wz.2000 helmet came with a 3-point chin strap. The peak of the helmet is closer to the original US PASGT helmet than other European variants in that the peak has more of the lip of the PASGT than the European-style sloping peak.
Hełm wz. 2000		Poland	2000	Polish Armed Forces, Armed Forces of Ukraine	
Hełm wz. 93		Poland	1993	Polish Armed Forces, Armed Forces of Ukraine, Armed Forces of Armenia	Being replaced by the Helm wz. 2005.
Kaska-1M		Ukraine	2013	Armed Forces of Ukraine	Production of the Kaska-1M began sometime in 2013. TEMP-3000, the helmet's manufacturer, has ceased public sale of it in favor of their new AURA helmet.
Hjälm 90		Sweden		Swedish Armed Forces	
Hjelm Cato		Norway	Early 2000s	Norwegian Armed Forces	Similar to the Swedish Hjalm 90.
Integrated Head Protection System		United States	2019	US Army	Part of the U.S. Army Soldier Protection System (SPS)
J-Force Pastactical (SAMI Gen I & SAMI Gen II)		Indonesia	2020s	Indonesian National Armed Forces	MICH and FAST type helmet
KASDA		Israel		Israel Defense Forces, Guatemalan Army	
Kyung Chang Industry (KCI) Intergrated Ballistic Helmet		South Korea	2022	Republic of Korea Armed Forces	MICH and FAST type helmet
KH-B2000		South Korea	2004	Republic of Korea Armed Forces	PASGT type helmet
Kolpak-20		Russia	2022	Russian Army	Russian combat helmet made of repurposed SSh-40 shells and polyethylene.
Lightweight Helmet (LWH)		United States	2003	United States Marine Corps	PASGT-style helmet with four-point retention strap system and velcro-attached head pad system. Also used by NZDF since the 2000s.
LShZ 1+		Russia	2012	Russian Special Forces, FSB, Syrian Army	
M02 Composite Helmet		Finland		Finnish Defence Forces	Upgraded PASGT-style helmet, replacing the Gefechtshelm M92-style M/92 Komposiittikypärä helmet.
M80 Helmet		Iraq	1980	Iraqi Army	Plastic and cloth copy of the M1 Helmet, Developed during Saddam Hussein's Iraq, Limited use on the modern Iraqi army.
M80/03 Helmet		Iraq	1980	Iraqi Army	Improved and stronger variant of the M80 helmet, this version has a distinct cover
M83 helmet		South Africa	1983	Paratroopers of the South African Army	Variant of the OR-201 helmet
M87		South Africa	1987	South African Army	Similar to US PASGT Kevlar helmet, replacing earlier Israeli-style helmet in use since the 1980s
M90 helmet		Iraq	1990		Another Iraqi copy of the M1 helmet, unlike the M80 helmet the M90 helmet is composed purely of plastic
M91 helmet		Australia		Australian Defence Force.	PASGT-style kevlar helmet. Was made by RBR Armour Systems Pty Ltd (Australia) introduced 1991. The Australian PASGT helmet was identical to the US PASGT helmet with the exception of a 3-point chin strap, much like the chin strap of the German B826 Gefechsthelm. Was replaced in 2004 by the Israeli-made Australian Enhanced Combat helmet.
M/92 Komposiittikypärä (also known as K-92)		Finland		Finnish Defense Forces.	Gefechtshelm M92-style PASGT helmet but with US PASGT style suspension system. Replaced in the early 2000s (decade) by the M/02. PASGT-Hjelm style blend helmet
MARTE helmet		Spain	1985	Spanish Armed Forces, Spanish Navy Marines	Versions I to IV, MARTE IV Kevlar helmet currently used by the Spanish Armed Forces. Similar to the PASGT. MICH type helmet replacing it in the Navy Marines.
Mile Dragić M-05		Serbia	2005	Serbian Special Forces	MICH type helmet
Mile Dragić M-97		Serbia	1997	Serbian Army	PASGT type helmet
M91 Eurokompozit		North Macedonia	1992	Army of North Macedonia; Police of North Macedonia	Macedonian version of the PASGT helmet. Produced by 11 Oktomvri Eurokompozit a.d. Prilep.
M89 Eurokompozit		North Macedonia	1992	Army of North Macedonia; Police of North Macedonia	Macedonian version of the Yugoslav M59/89 JUŠ. Produced by 11 Oktomvri Eurokompozit a.d. Prilep.
Mk. 6 helmet		United Kingdom	1986	British Armed Forces	Being replaced by the Mk. 7 helmet
Mk. 7 helmet		United Kingdom	2009	British Armed Forces	
MUKUT		India		Indian Armed Forces	Advanced Combat Helmet(ACH) type Kevlar helmet made by MKU.
MICH TC-2000		United States		special operations – United States Army	Developed for special operations use and became the basis for the Advanced Combat Helmet
MICH TC-2001		United States		special operations – United States Army	"High cut" version of the MICH 2000. It removes all ear protection enabling headgear to be worn
MICH TC-2002		United States		special operations – United States Army	"Gunfighter cut", which raises the area around the ears by about 1/2", allowing for a wider range of headsets to be used and roughly meeting the profile of the skateboard and whitewater helmets previously used by special forces.
MPC-1		Slovenia			Variant of OR-201 helmet
NP Aerospace AC200/650		Greece		Special Forces unit of the Hellenic Army, Hellenic Navy and Hellenic Air Force	– Gefechshelm type helmet. – Hellenic Army, Navy and Air Force primarily use the PASGT
Ops-Core FAST Helmet		United States	2009	United States special operations, United States SWAT and Law Enforcement, German Bundeswehr, Norwegian Armed Forces, Australian Defence Force, Australian Federal Police and others.	
OR-201		Israel	1976	Israel Defense Forces, Some units of Special forces of Indian Army, Irish Defence Force, Lebanon (Lebanese Forces, South Lebanon Army, Hezbollah, Lebanese Army), Honduran Army, Guatemalan Army, Peruvian Army, Romanian Army, Nicaragua (National Guard and Police), Portugal (Portuguese Marine Corps), South African Defence Force, Chilean Army (1st Parachutists Battalion "Pelantaru" (1º Batallón de Paracaidistas "Pelantaru")), Sri Lanka, and other countries.	
Patka helmet		India		Indian Armed Forces	Indigenously built helmet. It can prevent 7.62mm AKM round
PASGT helmet		United States	1983	United States Military, Argentine Army, Mexican Army, New Zealand Defence Force, Iraq, Costa Rica	First issued in 1983 to replace the M1 helmet. Former kevlar helmet used by the United States Army, Marine Corps, Navy. Used by the USAF, but is being phased out by the ACH US Air Force. Adopted by the Mexican Armed Forces in the 1990s to replace the M1 helmet. Replaced the M1 helmet of the Argentine army and modified with padded interiors. US-made PASGT helmets by UNICOR replaced the New Zealand M1 helmet in the 2000s. The NZ PASGT was a copy of the USMC Lightweight helmet in that it shares the 4-point retention system and head pad system.
QGF02		People's Republic of China	1994	People's Liberation Army	
QGF03		People's Republic of China	2005	People's Liberation Army	
QGF11		People's Republic of China	2019	People's Liberation Army	
RBH303IE		Ireland		Irish Defence Force	Variant of the Enhanced Combat Helmet (Australia) helmet made by Rabintex
Savar SVRH01		Turkey		Turkish Armed Forces and Gendarmerie General Command	Based on PASGT.
Savar SVRH02		Turkey		Turkish Armed Forces and General Directorate of Security	Based on MICH.
SBH 400		Pakistan		Pakistan Armed Forces	Magnum resistant helmets produced by GIDS.
Skat-R helmet		Russia			Russian version of FAST helmet.
Sistema Compositi SEPT-2 PLUS		Italy		Italian Armed Forces	
Sistema Compositi SUPERUBOTT		Italy		Special Units (particularly GIS) of the Italian Law Enforcement community	
F2 SPECTRA		France	1992	Danish Army, French Army, Canadian military, Austrian Army, Bangladesh Army, Malta Army, Royal Moroccan Army, Ukrainian Ground Forces, and United Nations peacekeeping forces	PASGT shape helmet produced by Gallet of France, introduced early 1990s. 'Spectra' is a brand-name of a type of resistant fibre, not the actual name of the helmet. Unlike most other European PASGT style helmets, the peak of the F2 has the same defined lip as the original US PASGT helmet, whereas other European PASGT-style helmets (such as the German M92 and the Croatian BK-3) tend to have a sloping peak.
STSh-81		Soviet Union	1981		Titanium helmet
Type 88 Helmet		Japan	1988	JSDF	PASGT type helmet
Gerät 605		East Germany	1982	National People's Army, Guyana Defence Force, Syrian army	The last steel combat helmet designed by East Germany. Later exported to various other countries

== See also ==
- Combat helmet
