= Paratrooper helmet =

Type of combat helmet worn by airborne forces

A paratrooper helmet is a type of combat helmet used by paratroopers and airborne forces. The main difference from standard combat helmets is that paratrooper helmets have a different harness and lining to withstand impact when jumping from aircraft and to keep the helmet stable in flight, and most have a lower-profile shell to reduce wind resistance. Most modern combat helmets have features making them suitable for airborne use.

== Examples ==
Model	Origins	Users
SPECTRA helmet	France	Used by the French Army, Danish Army, United Nations peacekeeping forces
M2 Helmet, M1C Helmet	United States	Used by the US Army Airborne forces in World War II, derivatives of the M1 Helmet with altered retention and liner
Modular Integrated Communications Helmet	United States	Developed for use by Special Operations Forces by the United States Army and became the basis of the Advanced Combat Helmet. It has now become the official combat helmet of the United States Army (ACH).
Helmet Steel Airborne Troop	United Kingdom	Used by British Armed Forces Paratroopers and Airborne forces from World War II until it was replaced by the M76
Mk 6 helmet/Mk 7 helmet	United Kingdom	Used by British Armed Forces (all arms)
M76 paratrooper helmet	United Kingdom	Used by British Armed forces Paratroopers and Airborne forces.
Hełm wz. 63	Poland	Used by Polish, Iraqi and East German paratroopers
Schuberth B828	Germany	Limitedly used by the paratroops in Bundeswehr like Fallschirmjäger, Spezialisierte Kräfte des Heeres mit Erweiterter Grundbefähigung für Spezielle Operationen and Kommando Spezialkräfte.
CCB	Brazil	Used by the Brazilian Armed Forces in two versions: Polymer and Kevlar.
Enhanced Combat Helmet	Australia	
GOLFO	Chile	Military of Chile, PASGT variant
