= ECH =

ECH may refer to:

- Echuca Airport, in Victoria, Australia
- Echuca railway station, Australia
- Embedded contact homology
- Emergency Command Hologram, a character in the television series Star Trek: Voyager
- Enhanced Combat Helmet (disambiguation)
- Epichlorohydrin
- Enterprise Cultural Heritage
- Encrypted Client Hello. A TLS protocol extension
