= Urgent Operational Requirement =

An Urgent Operational Requirement (UOR) is a system used by the British Ministry of Defence (MOD) to obtain urgent equipment for operations. UORs supplement the MOD's long-term planned procurement programme, and are funded by extra Treasury money.

UORs arise from the identification of previously unprovisioned and emerging capability gaps as a result of current or imminent operations or where deliveries under existing contracts for equipment or services require accelerating due to an increased urgency to bring the capability they provided into service. These capability shortfalls are addressed by the urgent procurement of either new or additional equipment, enhancing existing capability, within a time scale that cannot be met by the normal acquisition cycle.

Examples include:

- L129A1 Sharpshooter rifle – procured when British Army operations in Afghanistan found units required accuracy and lethality at ranges beyond that of the standard-issue L85A2 rifle.
- MTP Camouflage Uniform – again in Afghanistan, units found their current issue uniform (either woodland or desert Disruptive Pattern Material) unsuitable for the varied terrain. After successful trials of Crye Precision's MultiCam, the decision was made to procure a MultiCam-style camouflage, which later became standard issue.
- Mk 7 helmet – introduced in June 2009, the Mk 7 was procured after it was found the Mk 6 interfered with new body armour and could tip over soldiers' eyes when lying prone, obscuring vision. It was replaced by the Revision Military Batlskin Cobra Plus helmet.
- Archer artillery system – ordered in March 2023 to fill the role of AS-90 systems which had been donated to Ukraine during the Russo-Ukrainian War.
