= Enhanced Combat Helmet =

Enhanced Combat Helmet may refer to:

- Enhanced Combat Helmet (Australia) - the standard combat helmet of the Australian Defence Force
- Enhanced Combat Helmet (United States) - a plastic/composite combat helmet of the United States military
