= M76 paratrooper helmet =

Combat helmet of British airborne forces

The M76 Paratrooper helmet is a combat helmet of British origin issued to paratroopers and airborne forces of the British Army.

The M76 helmet has been issued since the Falklands War, replacing the World War II era Helmet Steel Airborne Troop. The first variants were made from fibreglass, offering less protection than the Mk6 combat helmet. It also first came with vinyl/leather chinstraps; these were prone to wear, but later replaced with the previous but durable webbing chinstraps from the HSAT, which would later come in green webbing with a black leather chin pad. Later variants came with improved ballistic protection found on the Mk6 which are still in use today. The liner is made from polystyrene with cork ear sections, removable for installing earphones etc.

== See also ==
- Mk 7 helmet - Mk 6 replacement, general issue commenced in June 2009
