= CABAL II =

Argentine ballistic combat helmet

The CABAL II is a ballistic combat helmet of Argentine origin. The helmet is made of aramid fibre and is similar in design to the Advanced Combat Helmet but with a more sloped front.

== Users ==
- Argentina

== See also ==
- OR-201
