= Iraqi M90 helmet =

Iraqi combat helmet

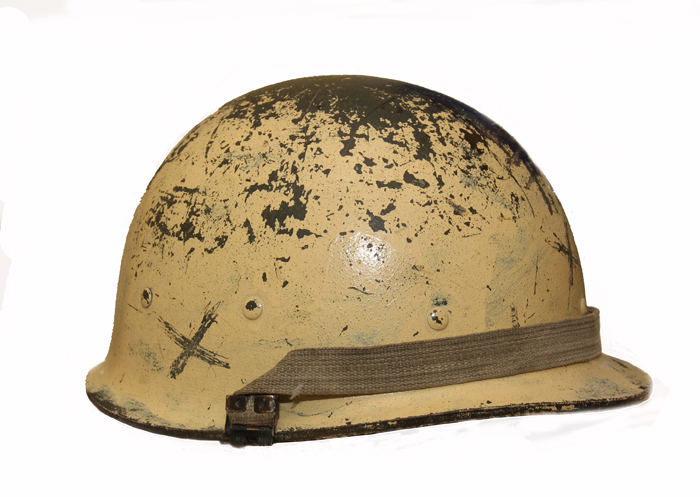
an Iraqi M80 helmet, similar to what the M90 looks like.

The Iraqi M90 helmet was a military helmet, and was a locally produced version of the Bangtan Helmet which was purchased from South Korea. The Iraqi M90 was of lower quality than the Bangtan Helmet, being made of plastic and usually fitted with a protective rubber rim, but was issued in the Iraqi armed forces from 1990 until 2003. Both types of helmet are still in limited service with the Iraqi Security Forces, but are being replaced by the American PASGT helmet. The Iraqi M90 helmet is sought by military collectors and is hard to find in good condition.
