= Sfera (helmet) =

Combat helmet

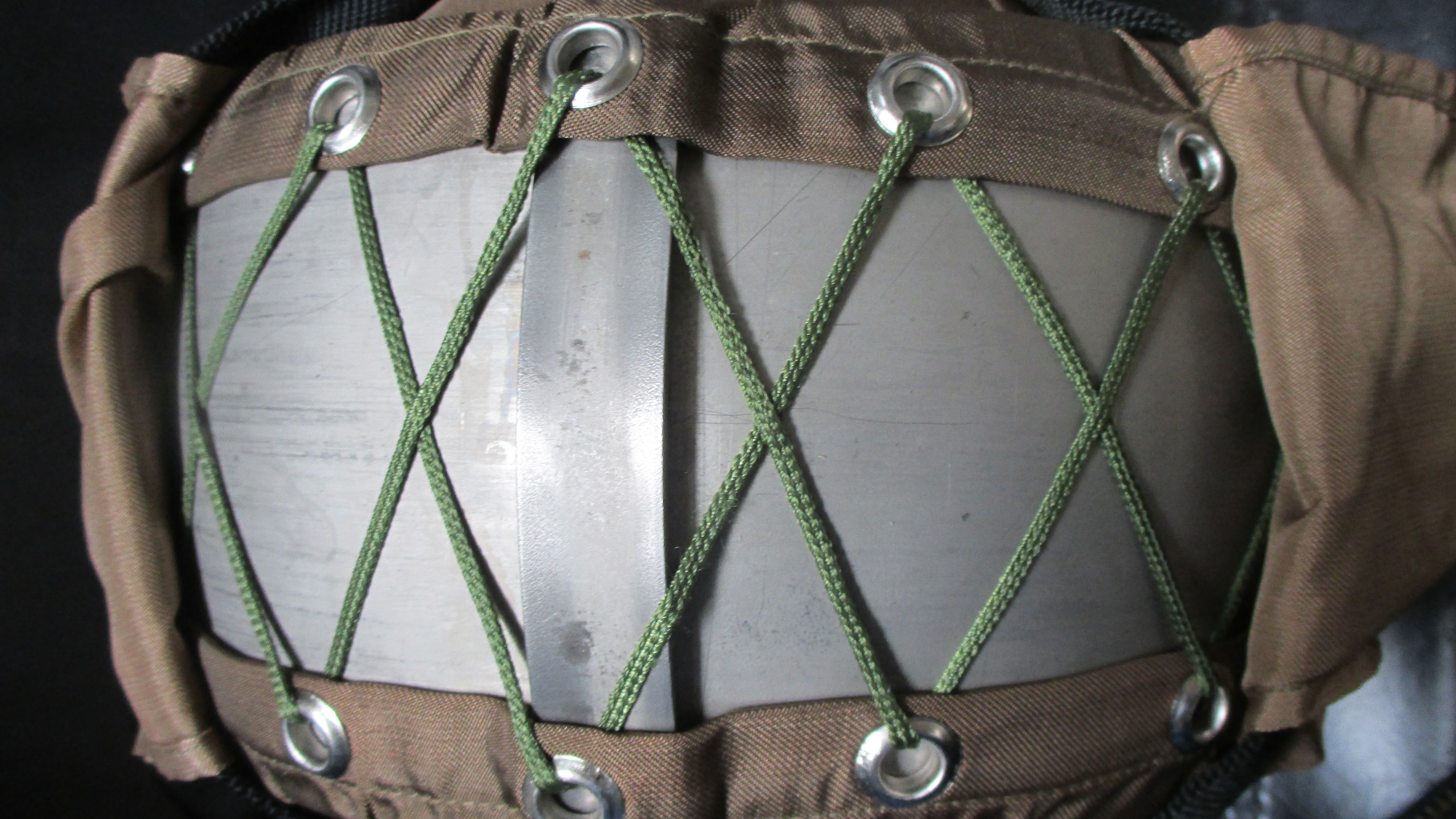
STSh-81 Сфера Titanium Helmet - Special Forces Military, Russia 1993

The Sfera (Russian: Сфера, lit. 'Sphere'), officially called STSh-81, are bullet-resistant combat helmets of titanium and steel manufactured with protective GOST rating of 2. They are worn by the Internal Troops of the Interior Ministry in the Soviet Union and its successor states Russia and Ukraine. These helmets continue to be used today by the police and special purpose troops.

== History ==
As early as 1984, the KGB had titanium helmets developed at military research facilities, which were further used and further developed by the FSB and special forces of the military after the disintegration of the Soviet Union.

== Design ==
Unlike most combat helmets, they are not one piece, but consist of three separate plates: two round ones on the sides of the head, and one bow-shaped one that sits on top, stretching from the neck to the forehead. These plates are kept together by a padded cover, with drawstring to adjust the size and fit of the plates. The helmet may also be camouflaged with a helmet cover which appears in such patterns as VSR and Flora.

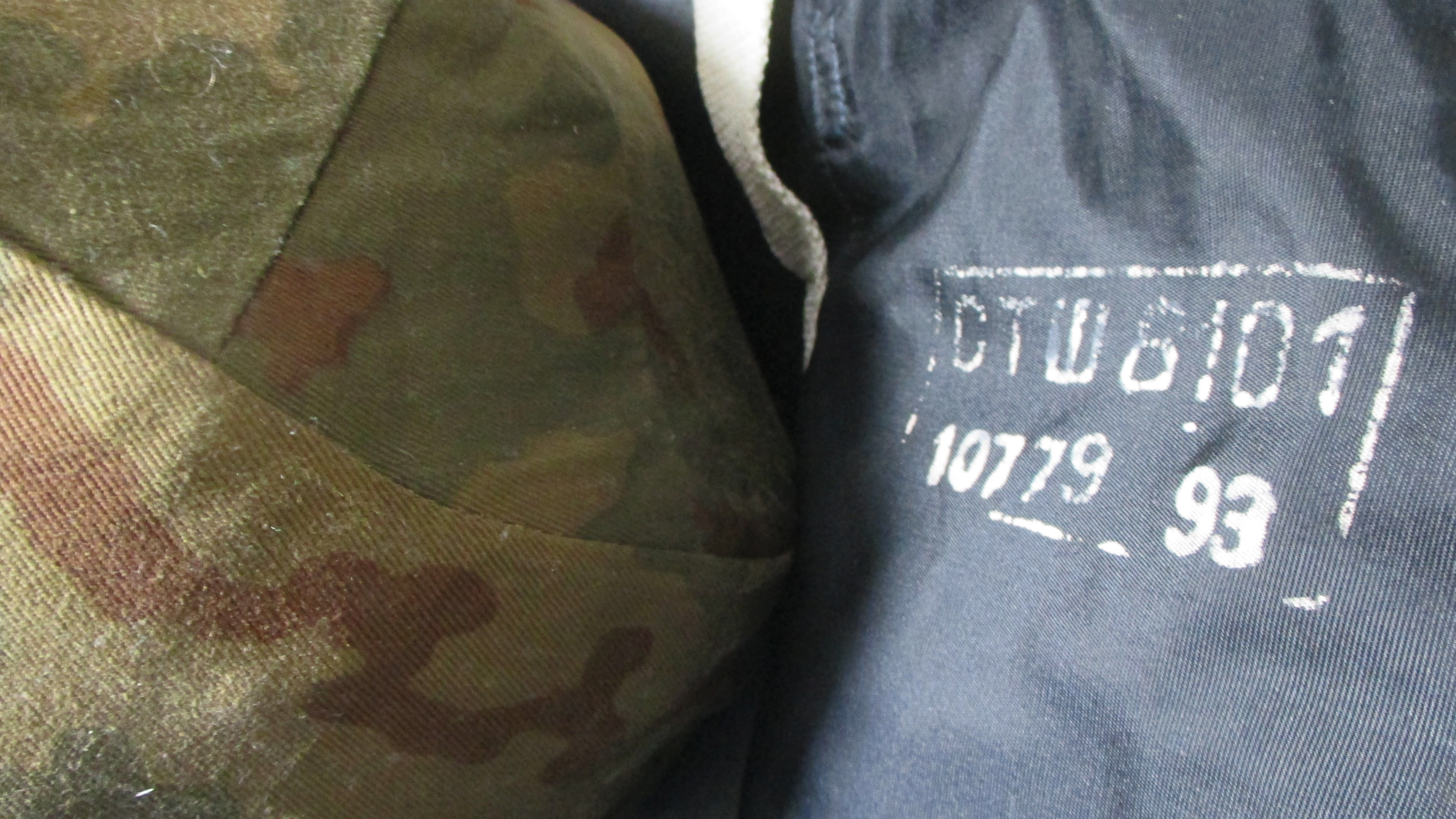
Titanium Helmet with Camouflage Cover Field Green - Russia - Military Special Forces - 1993 - Transport Bag

== Versions ==
=== STSh-81 Сфера ===
Introduced in the year 1981, the STSh-81 was the first example to be produced by НПП КлАСС (Classcom) and the material of choice was titanium. STSh-81 helmets are no longer in production. The last year of manufacture of the titanium helmet was 1993. It was discontinued for cost reasons.

=== SSSh-94 Сфера-С ===
The SSSh-94 is the successor to the STSh-81 and is currently produced by Classcom. Outwardly similar to its predecessor, the introduction of steel armor allowed for improved quality and protection at the cost of additional weight (The STSh-81 weighs 2.3kg while the SSSh-94 weighs 3.3kg). The steel used in the SSSh-94 is of the same type as that used in the Maska series of helmets.

== Users ==
=== Current ===
- Russia: Some Sferas used by Russian Army.
- Ukraine: Uses Ukrainian-made variant produced by TEMP-3000. Used by Ukrainian military and police forces.

=== Former ===
- USSR: Passed onto successor states.

== Bibliography ==
- Brayley, Martin J. (2008). Tin Hats to Composite Helmets: A Collector's Guide. Crowood Press UK. ISBN 978-1847970244.
