= Enterprise cultural heritage =

Enterprise cultural heritage (ECH) is the combination of history and products that belong to an enterprise and are recognised by the organization as a potential resource of novelty, innovation, and differentiation of products and services.

Enterprise cultural heritage shares a number of similarities with the creative industries, as most of the sectors addressed are the same, issues such as product differentiation and intellectual property rights management are also shared, however it has developed in new directions taking inspiration from the concept of the "extended product". Innovative practices in lifelong learning have been developed to support entrepreneurs, managers, and professionals in small and medium enterprises to gain competitive advantages through the exploitation of their ECH when designing and developing products and services.

Research studies, looking at the needs of small and medium enterprises demonstrate the existence of the characteristics of ECH in businesses (mainly related to the craft sector), describe how ECH is perceived in business organization in terms of practices, information, knowledge, and address the skills and competences needed to manage ECH.

== Four aspects of ECH management ==
The previously mentioned research studies found that ECH management is based upon a combination of skills that consist of the combination of four main areas:

- Brand management
- Change management
- Heritage management
- Intellectual property management

For each skill area a number of competences have been identified which can help leverage the ECH potential of the organisation into a competitive advantage. The competence mix needed is determined case by case using structured analysis and planning methodologies to help a business to gain awareness of the core elements of ECH and identify the heritage values attached to the business. These can then be exploited through branding and marketing by applying routines of continuous change in the organization and in production. The elements recognised as important elements of an enterprise's cultural heritage can be selected, preserved and protected through a suitable intellectual property management policy.

== Rationale ==
A long-term commitment to the use of ECH can give a distinct traditional, cultural and symbolic appeal to an organisation and its products with the purpose of stimulating interest in the company and its business. A company might publish its history and vision through a web page, booklet or book aimed at its desired market segment. Communication of heritage could include the year of establishment prominently placed on the company logo, communicating the message of experience, longevity and reliability and the implication of quality. A company might reuse existing objects, information and procedures to create an artisan atmosphere for customers or encourage employee commitment to the company.

== ECH Open Community ==
An open community has been established so that interested parties can collaborate to develop and disseminate the management methodologies applied to the exploitation of ECH in organisations. The Enterprise Cultural Heritage Open Community was founded by academics and enterprises to shape a methodology for managing ECH, develop competences, and maintain and enhance the definition of ECH.
