= M1C helmet =

US paratrooper helmet

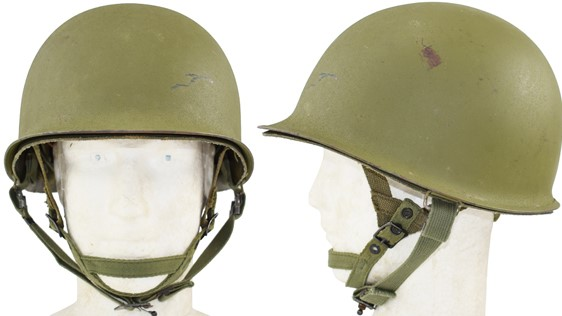
- M1C helmet
- Type: Paratrooper helmet
- Place of origin: United States

Service history
- In service: 1945–1980s
- Used by: United States Army
- Wars: World War II, Korean War, Vietnam War

Production history
- Designed: 1944
- Produced: 1945–1950s

The M1C helmet was a variant of the U.S. Army's popular and iconic M1 helmet. Developed in World War II to replace the earlier M2 helmet, it was not made available until issued to paratroopers in January 1945. It was different from the M2 in various ways, most importantly its bails (chinstrap hinges). The M2 had fixed, spot welded "D" bails so named for their shape, similar to early M1s. It was found that when sat on or dropped, these bails would snap off. The solution was the implementation of the swivel bail, which could move around and so was less susceptible to breaking.

Like the M2, its most visible differences from the standard infantry M1 helmet was the liner. The liner of the M1C, like most paratrooper liners, had a set of "A yokes" or straps fixed to the side of the liner to enable the use of a four-point chinstrap with leather chin cup to give support to the head and neck and prevent adverse movement during jumps. It used a simple but strong and reliable belt loop-type connection to secure the chinstrap to the a-yokes, which could be opened or closed from either side and thus partially removed without tools. This retention system was not significantly different to the M2's, and the normal infantry chinstrap could still be attached to the helmet shell if desired. Often, however, these modified liners could not be manufactured in time for jumps so they were modified by the soldiers themselves.

Another difference of the M1C was the chinstraps (this was seen on the M2). The chinstraps found on the M2 and M1C both had a button snap on the end so as to be fastened to the liner.

Despite the numerous differences between the M1C and the standard M1 helmet, the shell of the M1C is practically identical to standard swivel bail infantry helmets, making a concrete identification of a helmet as an M1C difficult. There's an argument to be made that the important part of an M1C is actually just a liner with the four-point chinstrap that can slip into any M1 helmet.

The M1C would continue in US service after World War II, with a new split-fabric chinstrap introduced between the Korean War and the Vietnam War not dissimilar to the one seen on the later PASGT helmet, but retaining the belt loop-style chinstrap connection. The M1C would remain in service until the adoption of PASGT, though the M1C would remain a fairly uncommon sight after Korea. They do turn up in various non-airborne units in Vietnam photography, however, suggesting that outside of jump-rated units they were treated like any other M1 and that they were perhaps more common than some thought.

== See also ==
- M1 Kasda, Israeli equivalent
