= RAC helmet =

World War II British combat helmet

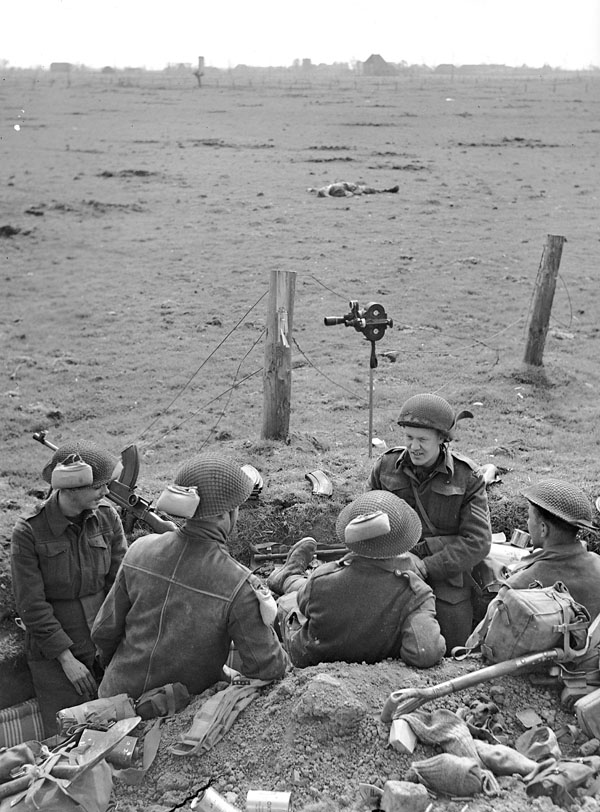
Sergeant F. Beal of the Canadian Army Film and Photo Unit talks to infantrymen of the Royal Hamilton Light Infantry in 1945. Beal is wearing a Dispatch riders helmet while the infantrymen wear Mkll helmets

The Royal Armoured Corps helmet is a combat helmet of British origin worn by Armoured Troops. As with the similarly shaped Helmet Steel Airborne Troop (HSAT) it was initially manufactured by Briggs Motor Bodies at Dagenham. It was introduced in the Second World War and was issued to Commonwealth countries in the post-1945 era up to the Falklands War. The RAC helmets came with the same suspension and liner that was used in MKll helmets and later the liner and elasticated chinstrap used in MkIV helmets. Many were converted to be used as a Paratrooper Helmet.

The Royal Armoured Corps helmet had the same shape, as did the helmets used by dispatch riders.

== Users ==
- Belgium
- United Kingdom
- Canada Used by Canadian tank crews attached to British armoured divisions
