= M1934 helmet (Spain) =

Military helmet

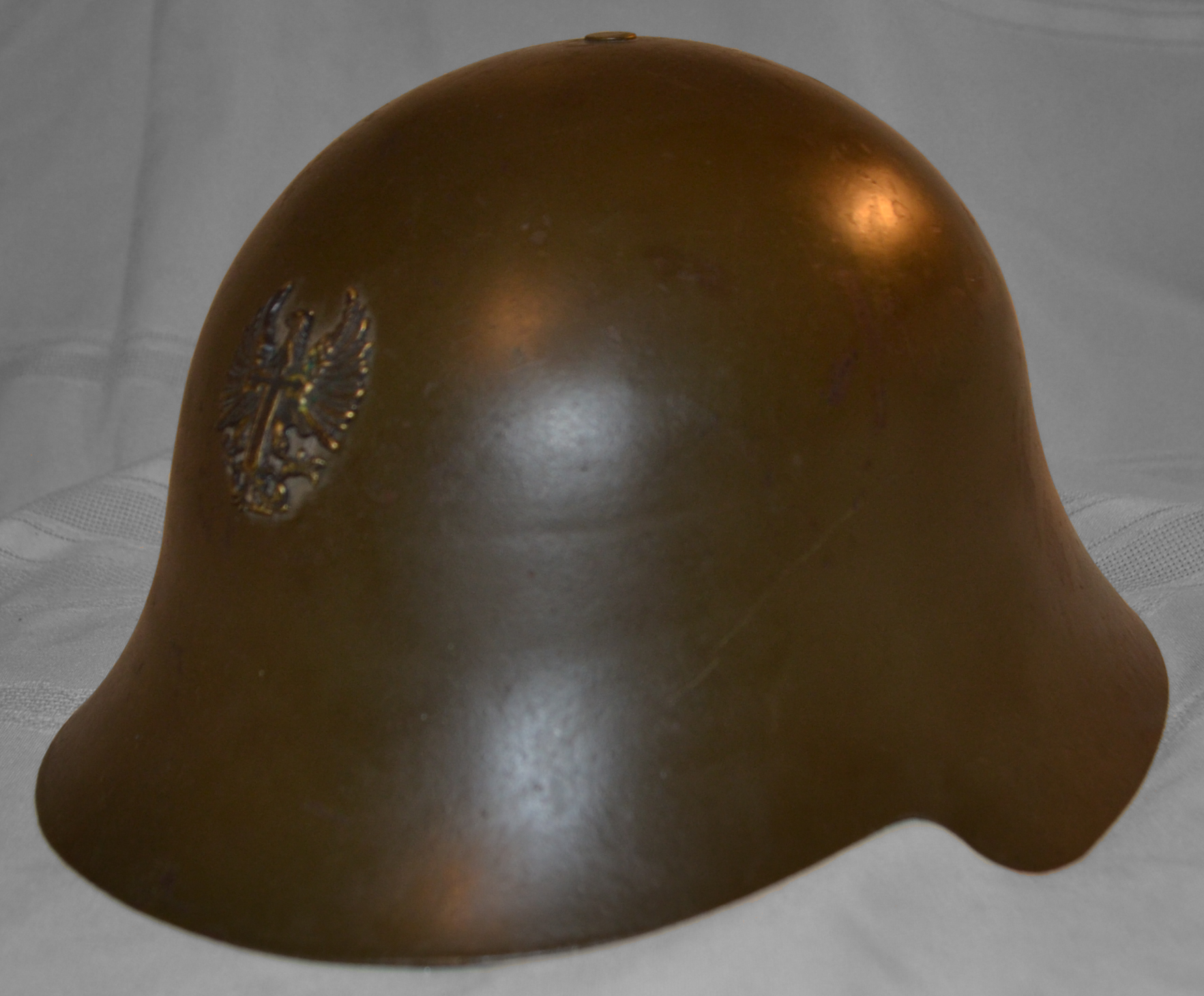
Spanish M34 helmet, note the rivet at the top of the shell that holds the liner in place.

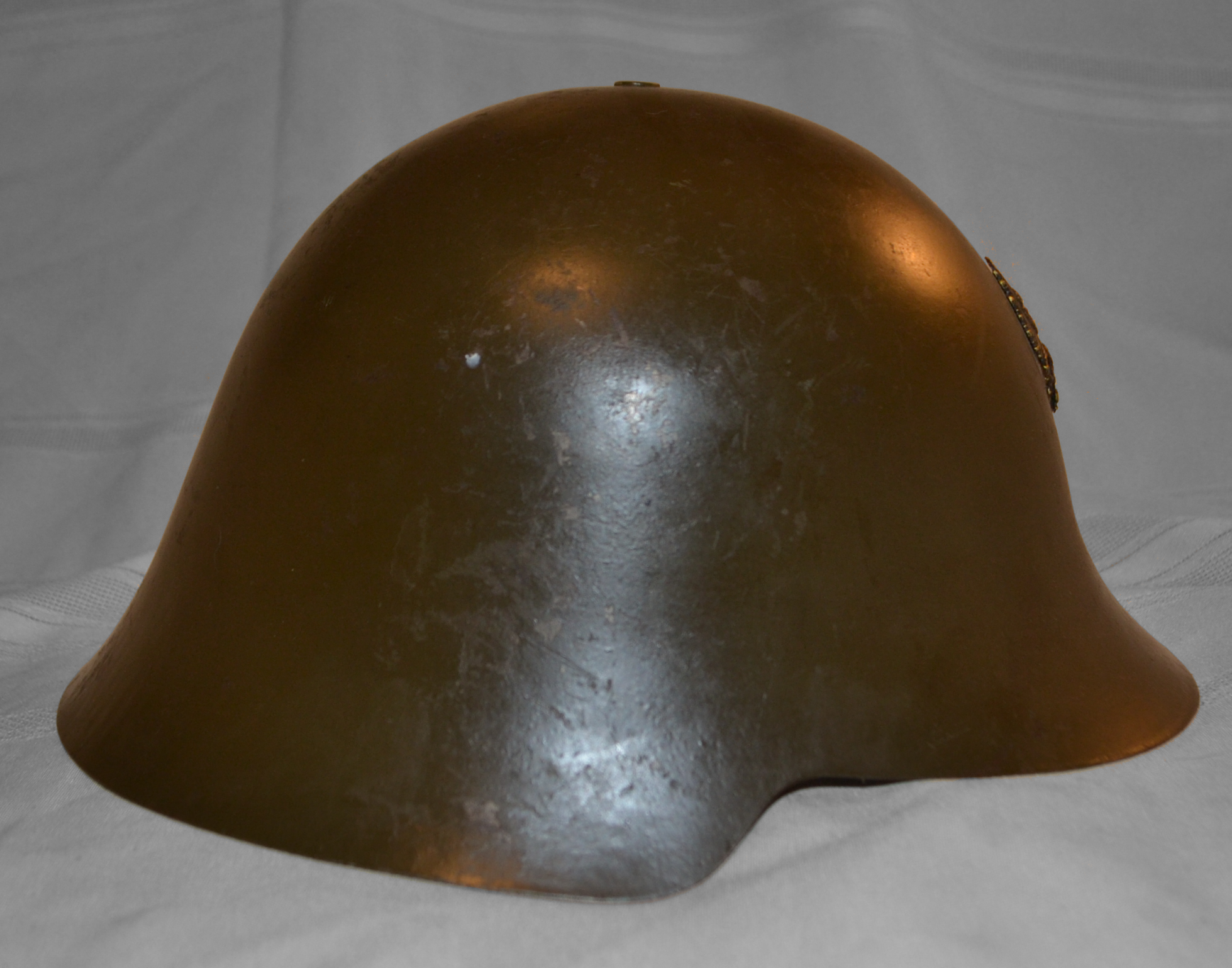
M34 profile

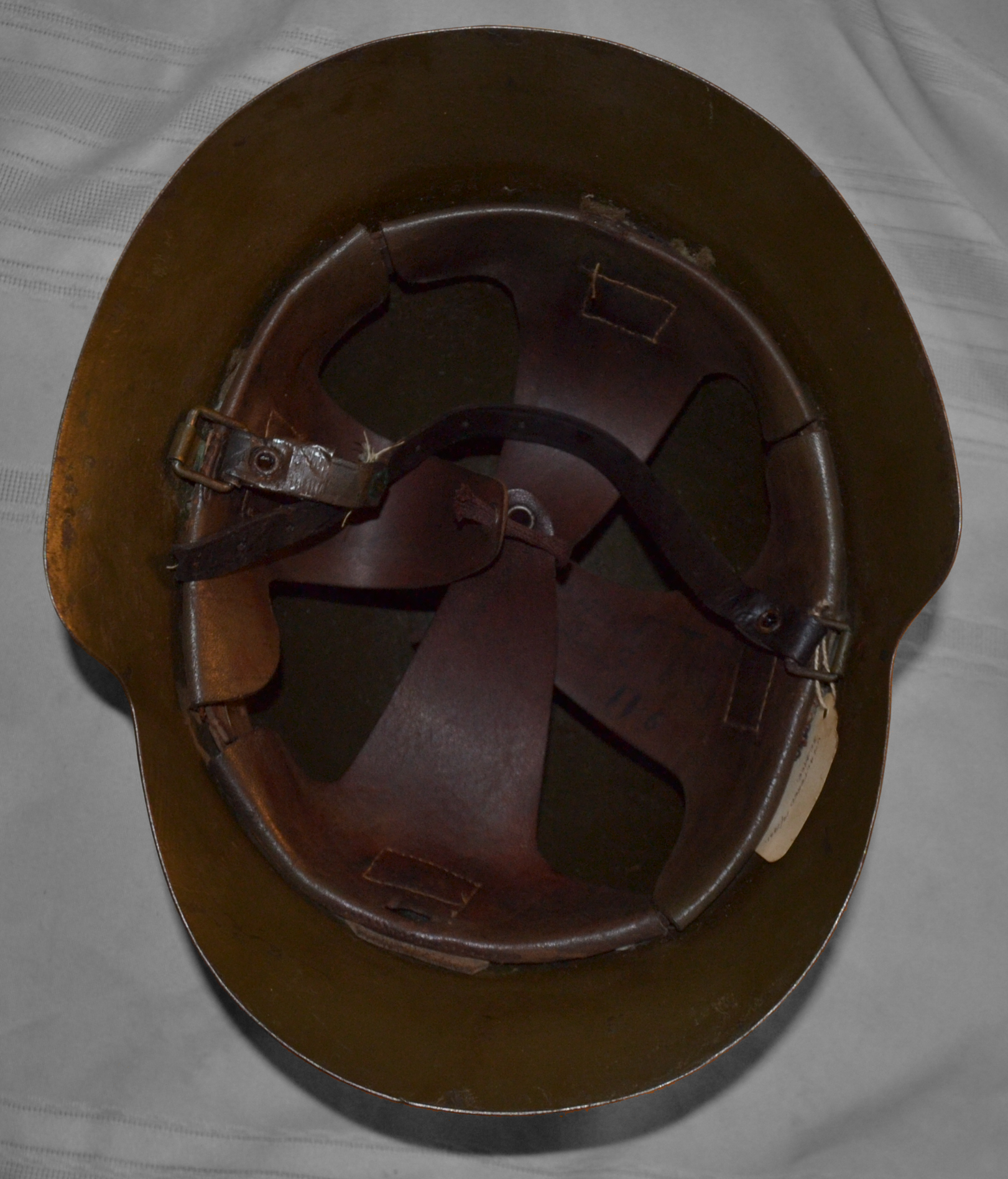
M34 liner

The M1934 helmet (also known as M38 for its years of distribution or “Eibar” for its supposed production in the city) is a steel combat helmet used by various factions in the Spanish Civil War. Not meant for use by the Spanish Army, but instead by security forces such as police, the helmet was of similar shape to the Model 1926 helmet in use by the army. The helmet was mainly used by the Nationalists in the conflict.

== Design ==
While being of similar shape to the M26 helmet, the M34 has many design features to distinguish itself. The shell is made of inferior material, only having 1 mm (0.039 in) thick steel and being lighter in overall weight to the M26, giving it worse ballistic and crash characteristics to the M26. The shell generally being painted in a sand color or light brown, with surviving examples being refurbished in the 1943 order with green paint and a frontal bracket. The liner is quite different from its army cousin, instead of being attached by seven rivets around the sides of the shell, the liner is affixed using sheet metal wire from the circumference band holding the pads to the very top of the shell by means of a single rivet. The liner features four smaller leather pads as opposed to the three on the M26. Behind said pads are four paltry sized felt pads to give cushioning between the pad and liner band. The chin strap is a simple belt and buckle system for wear. Post-Civil War the helmet would be held in reserve along with previous models until the 1970s with their total replacement by the M42 helmet.
