= Kaska-1M =

Ukrainian Kevlar helmet

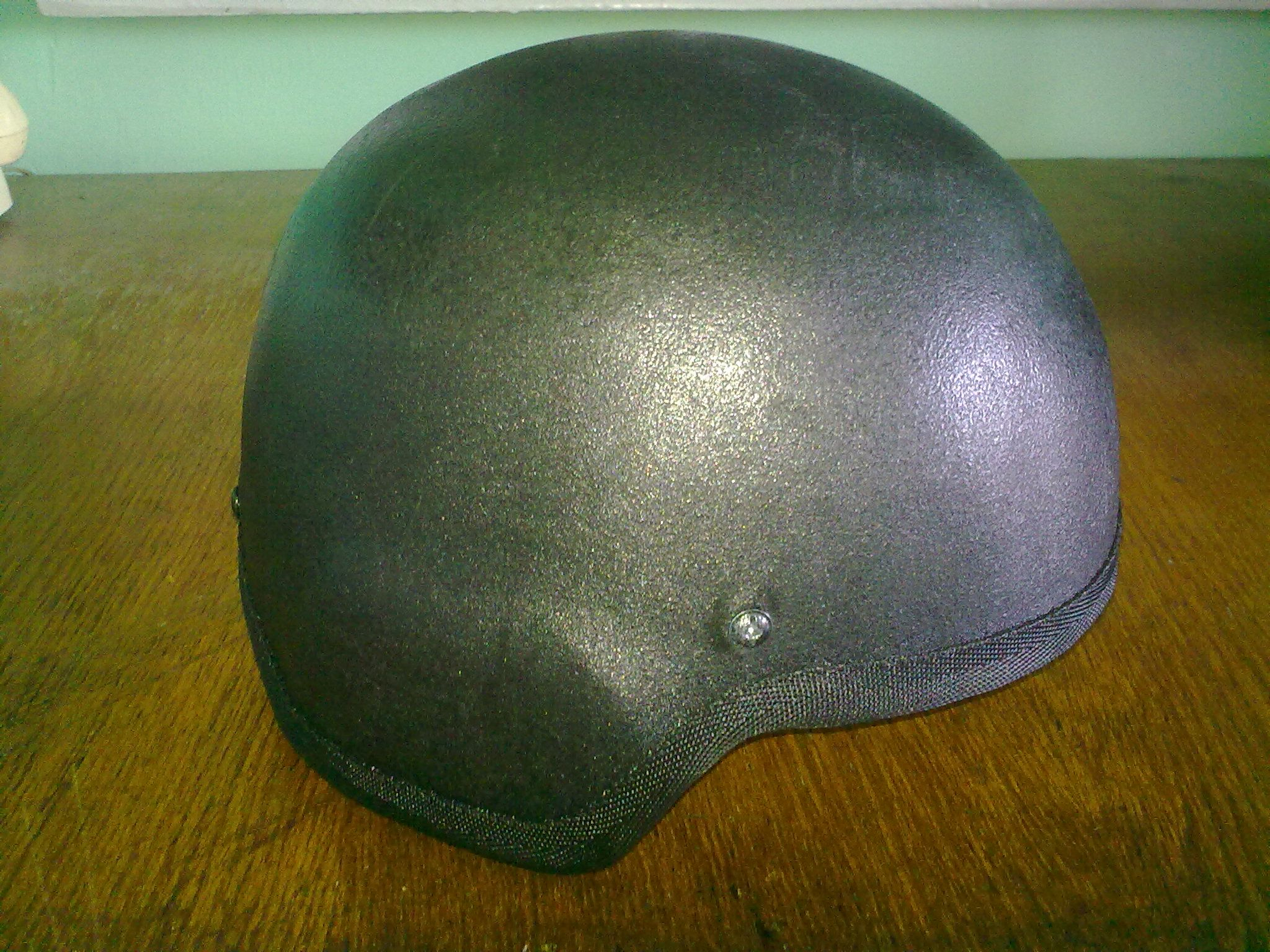
- Kaska-1M helmet
- Type: Combat Helmet
- Place of origin: Ukraine

Service history
- In service: 2013 – Current
- Used by: Ukraine
- Wars: War in Donbas; Russo-Ukrainian war (2022–present)

Production history
- Designer: TEMP-3000
- Designed: 2000s
- Manufacturer: TEMP-3000
- Produced: 2013 – 2024

Specifications
- Weight: 1.25 kg (Small); 1.30 kg (Medium); 1.40 kg (Large); 1.60 kg (X-Large)

The Kaska-1M is a combined-arms bulletproof Kevlar helmet, developed and manufactured by the Ukrainian company NPP TEMP-3000 LLC.

They are offered for export by Spetstechnoexport.

== History ==
In the 1990s, work on creating new models of protective helmets was not a priority for the newly-independent Ukraine due to a significant surplus of Soviet-made steel helmets, such as SSh-68, SSh-60 and SSh-40, which exceeded the needs of the Armed Forces of Ukraine. As a result, only in 1997 was a document drafted and approved establishing general requirements for protective helmets. — GSTU 78-41-004-97 "Helmets for protection against bullets. General technical conditions."

The development of a protective helmet made of para-aramid material was started by "TEMP-3000" in the mid-1990s and completed in the 2000s, when the company mastered the technology for the production of a composite bulletproof helmet made of polymer-coated Ultra-high-molecular-weight polyethylene. Later, using computer simulation, several prototypes of the helmet were made, which were submitted for shooting tests. The reference sample of the tested variant of the bulletproof helmet (which was later called "Kaska-1M") withstood five hits of bullets of the 9 × 19 mm "Parabellum" cartridge, fired from a distance of 5 meters.

In 2010, the Ukrspecexport included the "Kaska-1" helmet in the catalog of products offered for export by the defense industry of Ukraine.

Before the war in Donbas in the spring of 2014, the Ukrainian armed forces did not have any Kaska-1M helmets. After the outbreak of hostilities, the needs of the Ukrainian army for personal protective equipment increased. In the first half of 2014, the Ministry of Defense of Ukraine concluded a series of contracts for the supply of Kaska-1M helmets for the Armed Forces of Ukraine (according to official data from the Ministry of Defense of Ukraine, in the period up to 6 June 2014, 10,000 helmets were ordered for the Ukrainian Ground Forces at a price of 2,800 hryvnia per unit) and began to be delivered to the troops.

In the first half of 2015, the Armed Forces of Ukraine received another 64,580 Kaska-1M helmets. Subsequently, the supply of helmets to the troops continued. In the period from 1 January to 8 September 2015, the Armed Forces of Ukraine received 75,000 Kaska-1M helmets. In addition, in 2015, the helmets began to be purchased for the National Guard of Ukraine. However, as of early 2017, the bulk of the helmets in service with the Armed Forces and the National Guard of Ukraine were still Soviet-made.

In 2017, a production helmet was tested in the Teijin Twaron ballistic laboratory in Wuppertal, Germany, in accordance with the STANAG 2920 standard for NATO personal protective equipment. It was found that when the helmet was fired upon with a 1.1 gram FSP fragment simulator, the V50 parameter (the average speed at which the protective equipment is pierced through in 50% of cases) is 660 m/s.

In September 2017, helmets of this type were tested by Russian Naval Infantry, specifically the 810th Guards Naval Infantry Brigade, of the Black Sea Fleet. These tests included firing weapons at and striking the helmets. It was found that the protective properties of helmets decreased with use faster than those in storage. In general, after three or four years, the helmets' V50 parameter would decrease to 588 m/s.

In March 2019, the selling price of Kaska-1M helmets was UAH 3,149/piece (9% more expensive than November 2018).

Later, during the increase in the personnel of the Armed Forces of Ukraine in 2020–2021 (including the creation of territorial defense units), the need for protective equipment increased; on 26 January 2022, the German government agreed to provide Ukrainian troops with 5,000 helmets; on 8–9 February 2022, a batch of helmets was delivered from the UK. After 24 February 2022, the volume of military aid was increased (in the period up to 27 May 2022, 50,000 helmets were delivered from the USA, another 5,000 from Sweden, and additional helmets were supplied by other countries). As a result, by June 2022, several different types of helmets were used in the armed forces and other paramilitary formations of Ukraine.

== Description ==
The design of the helmet was developed based on the American Advanced Combat Helmet and Enhanced Combat Helmet, has a streamlined shape that allows the helmet to be used together with chemical protection equipment, and also provides the ability to use optical devices, communication equipment, and wear active headphones.

Structurally, the helmet consists of a package of ballistic fabric with good thermostability (it is reported that the presence of a Kaska-1M helmet on the head makes the soldier's head less visible to thermal imaging), an outer coating (polyurethane waterproof compound painted with matte paint), and a four-point fastening belt harness system to fix the helmet on the head. Along the lower contour, the helmet is framed with a polymer piping.

The helmet provides anti-fragmentation and anti-bullet protection according to protection class 1A of the state standard of Ukraine and is available in three sizes (large, small, and medium).

== Variants and modifications ==
- "Kaska-1M kit no. 7" (TOR-D) - a lightweight helmet for paratroopers with a reduced protection area, equipped with a BOA suspension system made in the USA.

== Accessories ==
The helmet comes with an MM-14 camouflage cover, and can be additionally equipped with a mount for a night vision device or a universal Picatinny rail (for mounting a flashlight, video camera, or other helmet-mounted equipment on the side of the helmet).

== Operators ==
- Ukraine:

- Armed Forces of Ukraine — in the mid-2000s, a small number of helmets were tested in the units of the Ukrainian contingent in Iraq; after testing was completed in 2014, the helmet was approved as a standard general-purpose protective helmet for the Armed Forces of Ukraine.
- National Guard of Ukraine
