= Helmet Steel Airborne Troop =

British paratrooper helmet

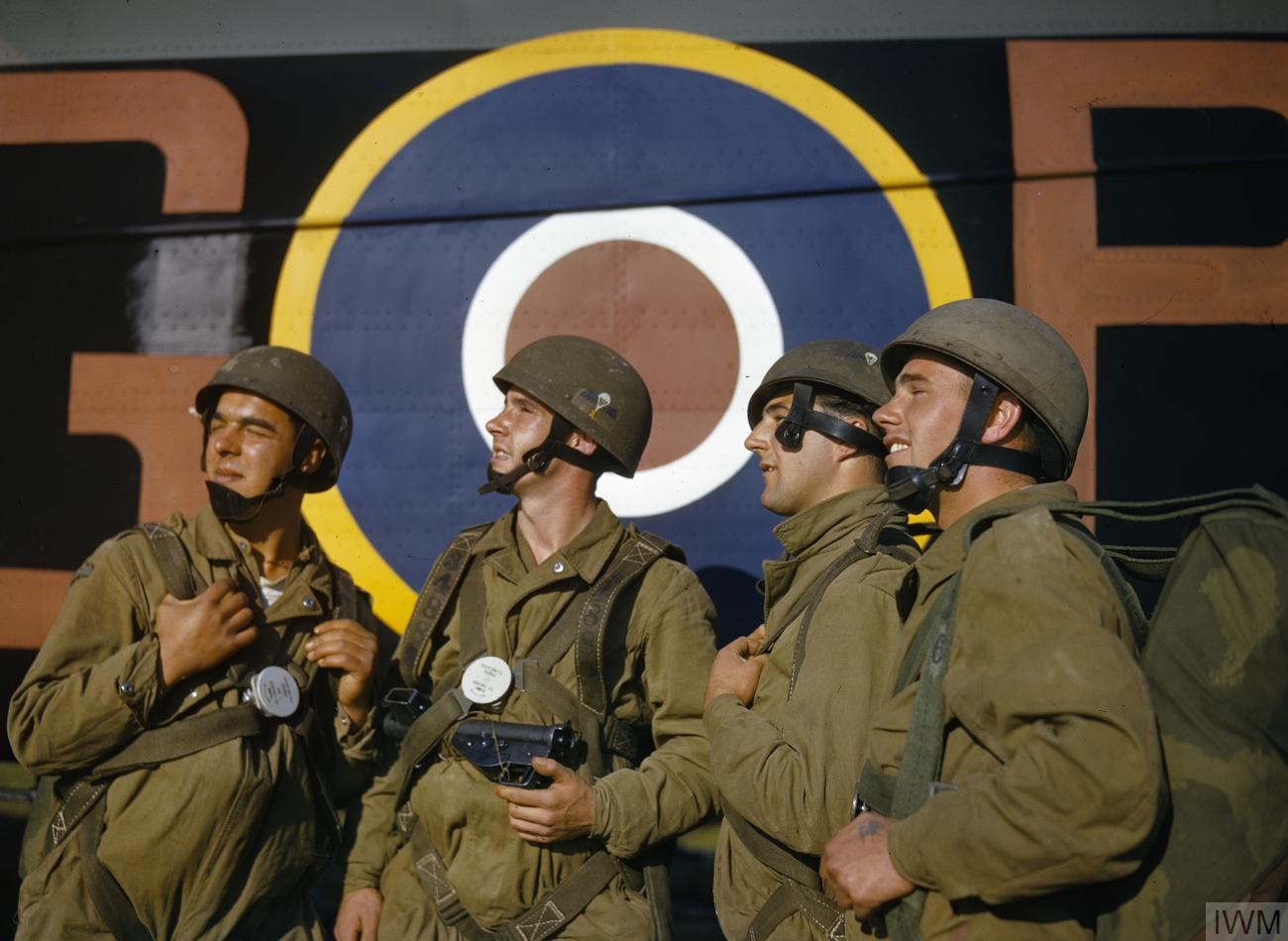
October 1942. Members of the British 1st Airborne Division, training at Netheravon.

The Helmet Steel Airborne Troops (HSAT) is a paratrooper helmet of British origin worn by paratroopers and members of airlanding units. It was introduced in the Second World War by the British Army and was also used by other Commonwealth armies. It continued to be used in the postwar era until the early 1980s. It was in the process of being replaced, with parachute battalions being issued as priority, when the Falklands War occurred. As with the similarly shaped RAC helmet and despatch rider motorcycle helmet, it was initially manufactured by Briggs Motor Bodies at Dagenham.

== Variants ==
All four variants were used during the Second World War with the last variant being revised in the mid 1950s.

=== P Type Helmet ===
The first prototype variant was used during the Bruneval Raid, these came with a rubber padding found on the rear. The helmets were short lived and replaced by the HSAT.

The first steel helmet was produced at the BMB factory in 1941. These early "P Type" helmets only numbered between 500 and 1,000 units. The P Type featured a non-magnetic manganese steel shell with a rubberized rim and a lining with interior padding that was similar to the German M36/40 design.

Some soldiers issued with these helmets continued to use them throughout the war. An example worn during the Battle of Arnhem can be found on display in Hartenstein Museum, the Netherlands.

=== HSAT ===
The next step in the evolution of the British helmet came in 1942. This helmet featured a similar shell design, but with a thick vulcanized fiber band rim that clearly distinguishes it from the German model, along with a four-point chinstrap system and a band of sorbo rubber for padding. These early helmets used leather chinstraps and are considered quite rare.

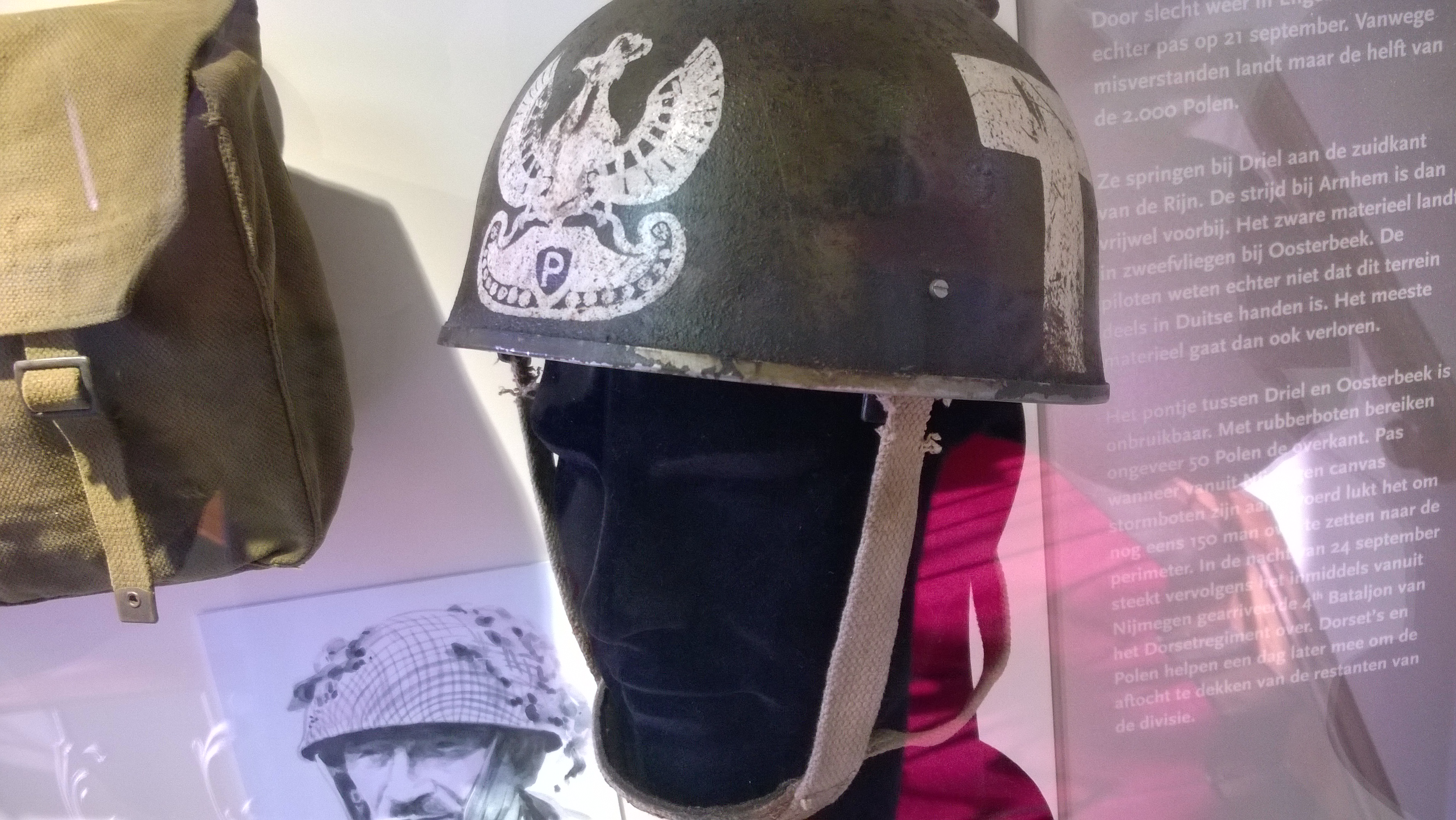
A Mk II HSAT worn by Polish General Stanisław Sosabowski.

=== HSAT Mk I ===
Third pattern, came with the same leather chinstraps and a steel rim instead of the fibre rim (issue October 1942).

=== HSAT Mk II ===
Fourth pattern, came with the three-point webbing chinstrap. This variant was also used after the Second World War, leaving service around the time of the Falklands War. Throughout the 1980s, some of the earlier issue chinstraps were later reused on the more current glass reinforced plastic "Helmet, Parachutist, Lightweight" / "Helmet Parachute".

The fittings of the wartime issue varied from the 1950s postwar issue. The wartime chinstrap had brass ends and rivets: these were manufactured in blackened steel in the 1950s (in line with production of the 1937 Pattern web equipment at that time). The temporal bales of the postwar helmet were of a slightly different design.

== Users ==
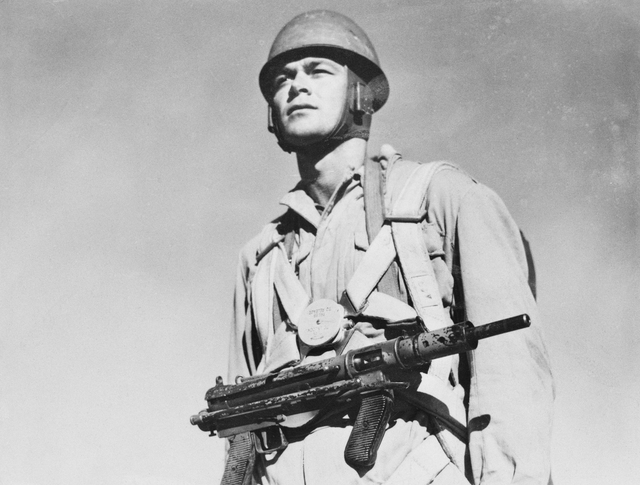
1944. Cpl John D. "Jock" McLeod of the Australian Parachute Battalion Training Centre, demonstrating a British-pattern HSAT. At earlier stages of the war, Australian paratroopers had used US-made airborne helmets. (Amongst the other equipment visible are an Australian-designed Mk 1 Austen submachine gun and a 32 ft parachute modelled on the British Statichute.)

- Australia
- Belgium
- Canada
- India
- Israel
- Pakistan
- Poland - Polish Armed Forces in the West
- Rhodesia
- United Kingdom
- Kuwait
