= Enhanced Combat Helmet (Australia) =

Standard issue combat helmet of the Australian Defence Force

The Enhanced Combat Helmet (ECH) was the standard issue combat helmet of the Australian Defence Force, introduced in 2004 to replace the M91 helmet, an Australian version of the American PASGT helmet, it was replaced by the Team Wendy EXFIL Ballistic helmet from 2015

== Design ==
The ECH is manufactured by Israeli company Rabintex, and was selected in a competition between four rival designs. It is the same shape as the U.S. MICH 2000 helmet, but is lighter in weight and has a Bundeswehr M92 helmet-style padded headband/crown pad suspension system. It retains the 3-point chin strap that was used on the previous Australian M91 PASGT helmet.

The ECH has four sizes (Small, Medium, Large and Extra Large). It was also in service with the New Zealand Defence Force from 2009 to 2019. Its Rabintex model number is RBH 303 AU.

== Users ==
- Australia: used by all branches of Australian Defence Force (replaced by the Team Wendy EXFIL Ballistic helmet as Tiered Combat Helmet.) and Specialist Response Group of the Australian Federal Police
- Ireland: used by Irish Defence Force.
- Netherlands: used by several branches of Netherlands military, and Brigade Speciale Beveiligingsopdrachten Police tactical unit.
- New Zealand: used by all branches of New Zealand Defence Force and Special Tactics Group of the New Zealand Police from 2009. Replaced by NZDF in 2019.
