= Mk 7 helmet =

Type of combat helmet of the British Armed Forces

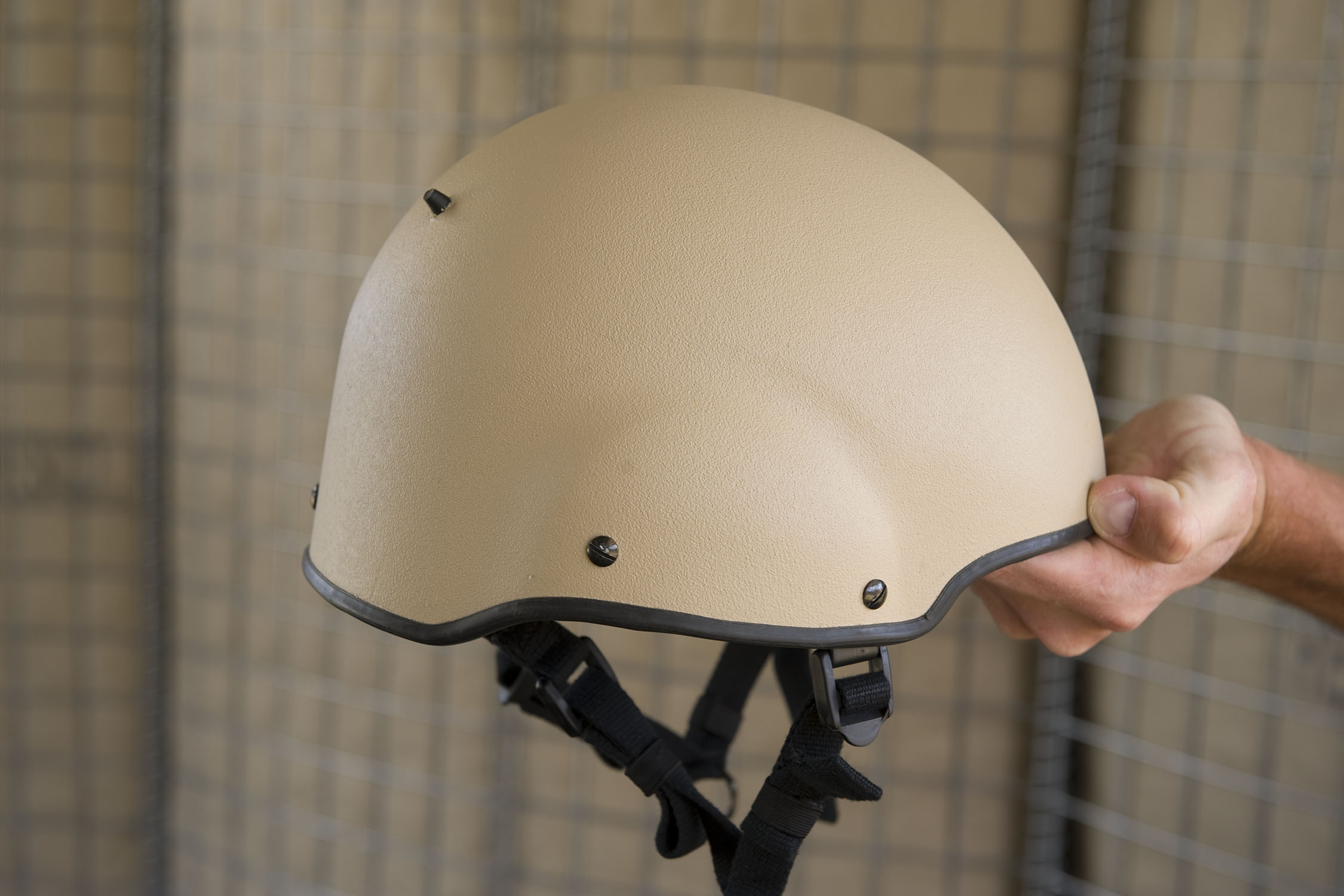
- A Mark VII combat helmet without camouflage cover
- Type: Combat helmet
- Place of origin: United Kingdom

Service history
- In service: June 2009
- Used by: See Users

Production history
- Manufacturer: NP Aerospace

The Mark 7 helmet is a former general issue combat helmet of the British Armed Forces, which was replaced by the Revision Batlskin Cobra Plus as part of the Virtus programme. Officially known as the GS (General Service) Mark 7 combat helmet, it replaced the previous Mk 6 and Mark 6A helmets.

The helmet is manufactured by NP Aerospace.

== History ==
The Mk 7 helmet was introduced in June 2009 as an Urgent Operational Requirement. It was first shown through the Defence Vehicle Dynamics (DVD) event in Millbrook alongside the Osprey body armour. The British Ministry of Defense announced a purchase of 10,000 sets under initial contracts worth £16 million.

In November 2010, three soldiers from the Royal Irish Regiment credited the helmet for saving their lives when they engaged in a gunfight with Taliban forces. In July 2011, a soldier from the Brigade Reconnaissance Force also credited the helmet with nearly being killed during a gunfight in Helmand province. Defence Science and Technology Laboratory, based in Afghanistan, was asked to assess the damage done to his helmet. Several Mk 7 helmets were donated to the Ukrainian military in 2014.

The Mk 7 helmet was replaced by the Revision Military Batlskin Cobra Plus helmet as part of the Virtus programme.

== Design ==
The Mk 7 offers superior ballistic protection compared to the Mk 6 and Mk 6A, and its newer shape allows the soldier to accurately fire their rifle without hindrance. The previous Mk 6 and Mk 6A combined with the Osprey Body Armour system in use at the time made it difficult for soldiers to maintain this firing position, as the helmet rim would tip over the user's eyes.

The helmet weighs one kilogram (35 oz), significantly less than its 1.5-kilogram (53 oz) predecessor. It also has better chin strapping for stability and is produced in a new colour - tan, unlike the Mk 6A in black and Mk 6 in olive. The Mk 7 is constructed out of Kevlar, rather than the Mk 6, which was produced using ballistic nylon, and the Mk 6A, which used a combination of ballistic nylon and additional layers of Aramid fibres over the top.

The mean penetration velocity (V_{50}) for the Mk 7 is about 650 metres per second (2,100 ft/s). This is the velocity at which half (50%) of projectiles are expected to penetrate, and is a measure of the helmet's ballistic protection.

== Users ==
- Ukraine: In 2014, around 84,000 Mk 7 helmets donated for Ukrainian troops.
- United Kingdom: Issued the Mk 7 together with the Osprey body armor in June 2009.
