= Polish People's Army =

Military of the Polish People's Republic

- Ludowe Wojsko Polskie
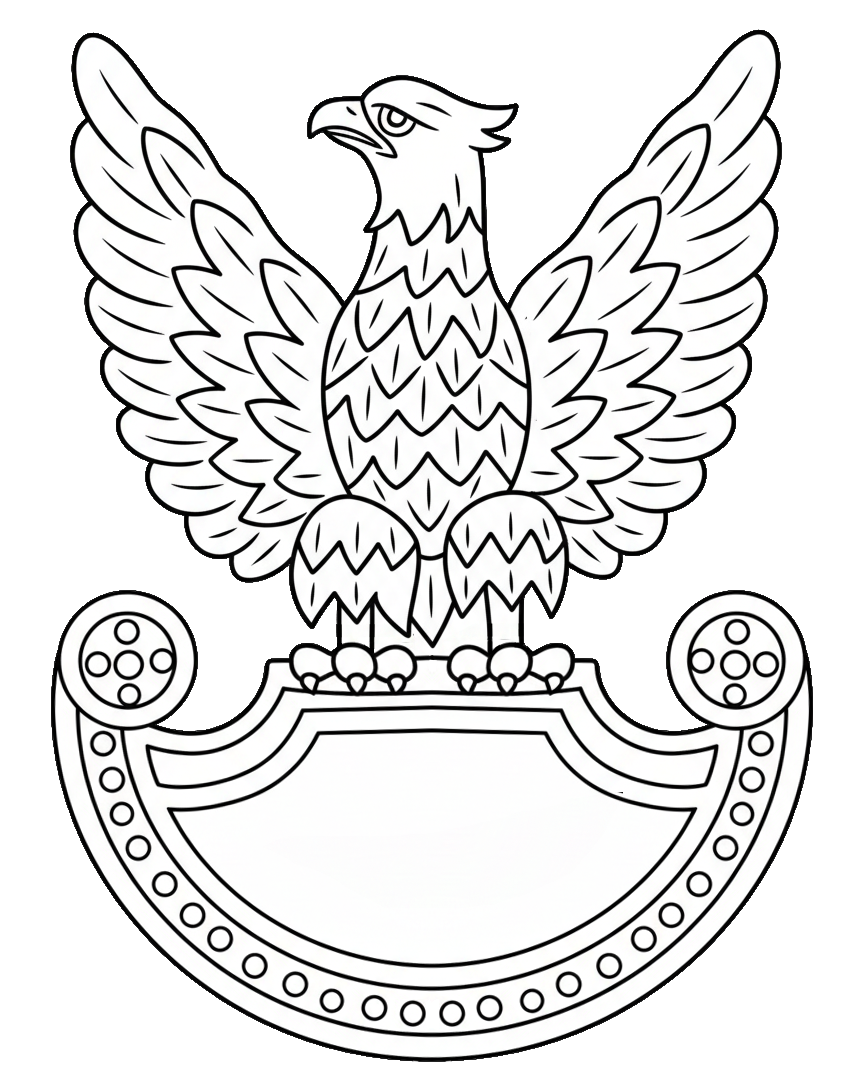
- Emblem worn by LWP soldiers
- Founded: May 1943
- Disbanded: December 1989
- Service branches: Polish Land Forces; Polish Army Air Force (1943–1947); Polish Air Force (1947–1989); Polish Air Defence Force (1962–1989); Polish Navy
- Headquarters: Seltsy, Russian SFSR (1943–1945); Warsaw, Poland (1945–1989)

Leadership
- Supreme Commander-in-Chief: Wojciech Jaruzelski (last)
- Minister of National Defence: Florian Siwicki (last)
- Chief of the General Staff: Józef Użycki (last)

Personnel
- Active personnel: 200,000 (World War II)

Related articles
- History: World War II - Eastern Front: Battle of Lenino; Operation Bagration; Lublin-Brest Offensive; Warsaw Uprising; Battle of Studzianki; Vistula–Oder Offensive; Battle of Poznań; East Pomeranian Offensive; Battle of Kolberg; Battle of Berlin; Battle of the Seelow Heights; Battle of Bautzen; Prague Offensive; Aftermath of World War II: Anti-Communist Insurgency; Polish–Ukrainian ethnic conflict (1945–1947); Czechoslovak Border Conflicts; Invasion of Czechoslovakia

The Polish People's Army (Polish: Ludowe Wojsko Polskie, pronounced [luˈdɔvɛ ˈvɔjskɔ ˈpɔlskʲɛ]; LWP) was the second formation of the Polish Armed Forces in the East during the latter stages of the Second World War (1943–1945), and subsequently the armed forces of the Polish communist state (1945–1989), which was formalised in 1952 as the Polish People's Republic.

The creation of communist-led Polish armed forces that were outside the command of the Polish government-in-exile was allowed and facilitated by Soviet leader Joseph Stalin, following efforts made in the early 1940s by Soviet-based Polish exiles Wanda Wasilewska and Zygmunt Berling.

Initially called the Polish Army in the USSR from 1943 to 1944, it became the Polish Troops and Armed Forces of the Republic of Poland from 1944 to 1952, and thereafter the Armed Forces of the Polish People's Republic. During these restructurings, the Polish military was increasingly integrated into Soviet military and command structures, becoming comparatively more distinct and independent in 1956.

On 7 October 1950, the anniversary of the Battle of Lenino—one of the first major engagements of Polish Armed Forces in the East against Axis forces—was declared the official "Day of the Polish People's Army" by the People's Republic.

== History ==
=== World War II ===
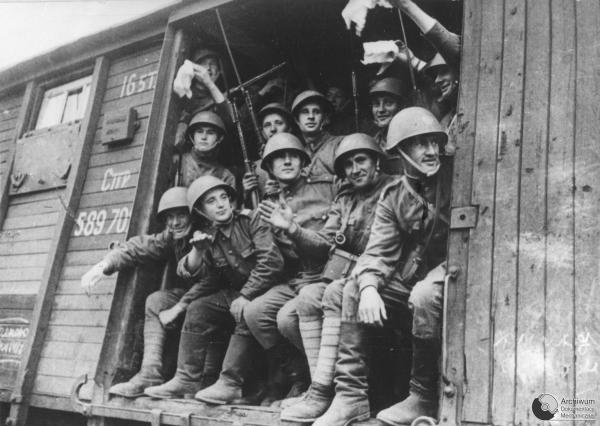
Polish troops, 1943

What became the LWP was formed during World War II, in May 1943, as the 1st Tadeusz Kościuszko Infantry Division, which developed into the First Polish Army, unofficially known as Berling's Army. Because of the shortage of Polish officers and the policies of the Soviet Union, in March 1945 Soviet Red Army officers accounted for nearly 52% of the officer corps (15,492 out of 29,372). Around 4,600 of them remained in the LWP by July 1946.

It was not the only Polish formation that fought on the Allied side, nor the first one formed in the East. The earlier Polish force formed in the Soviet Union, known as Anders' Army, was loyal to the Polish government-in-exile and by that time had moved to Iran. The communist-led Polish forces soon grew beyond the 1st Division into two major commands – the First Polish Army (initially under Zygmunt Berling) and the Second Polish Army (commanded by Karol Świerczewski). The First Polish Army participated in the Vistula–Oder Offensive, the Battle of Kolberg and the final Battle of Berlin.

=== Immediate post-war years ===
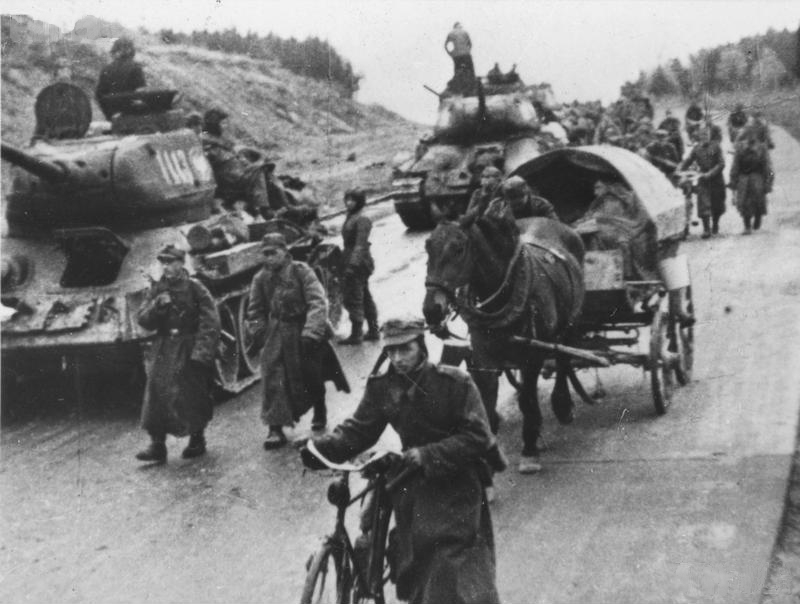
The Polish First Army on their way to Berlin, 1945

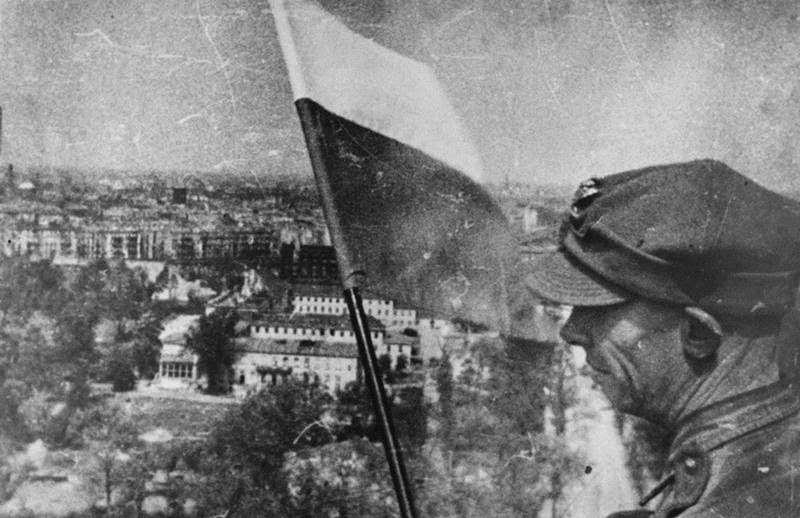
Polish flag raised on the top of Berlin Victory Column on 2 May 1945

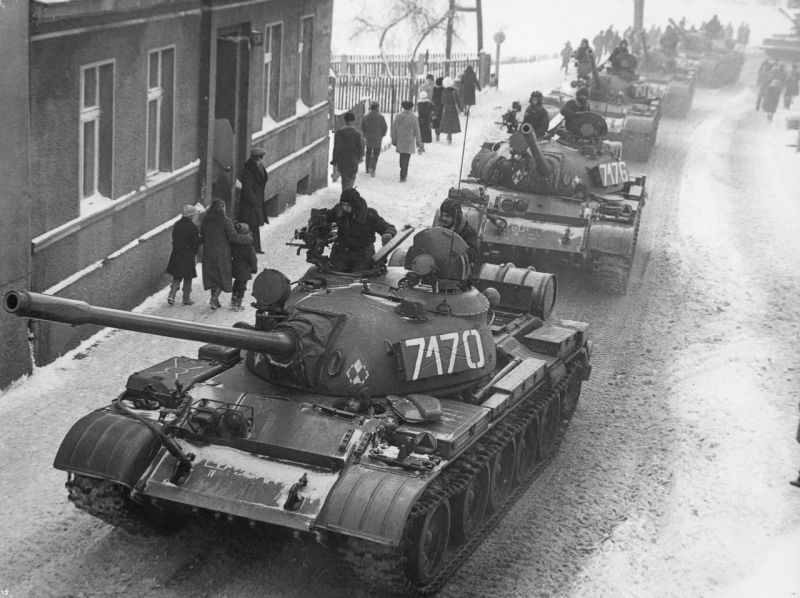
T-55A tanks of the Polish People's Army (Martial law in Poland)

After the war the Polish Army was reorganized into six (later seven) military districts. These were the Warsaw Military District, headquartered (HQ) in Warsaw, the Lublin Military District, HQ in Lublin, the Kraków Military District, HQ in Kraków, the Łódź Military District, HQ in Łódź, the Poznań Military District, HQ in Poznań, the Pomeranian Military District, HQ in Toruń, and the Silesian Military District, HQ in Katowice.

In the late 1940s and early 1950s, the Polish Army was under the command of Marshal of the Soviet Union, Marshal of Poland and Minister of Defense of Poland Konstantin Rokossovsky. It was increasingly integrated into Soviet military structure and organisation. This process was mitigated in the aftermath of the Polish October of 1956, when Władysław Gomułka formalised aspects of Poland's military relationship with the Soviet Union. The Sovietisation of the armed forces structure was phased out altogether and thus the combat and service support structures were integrated once more into regular combat formations following the old Polish model.

=== Cold War ===
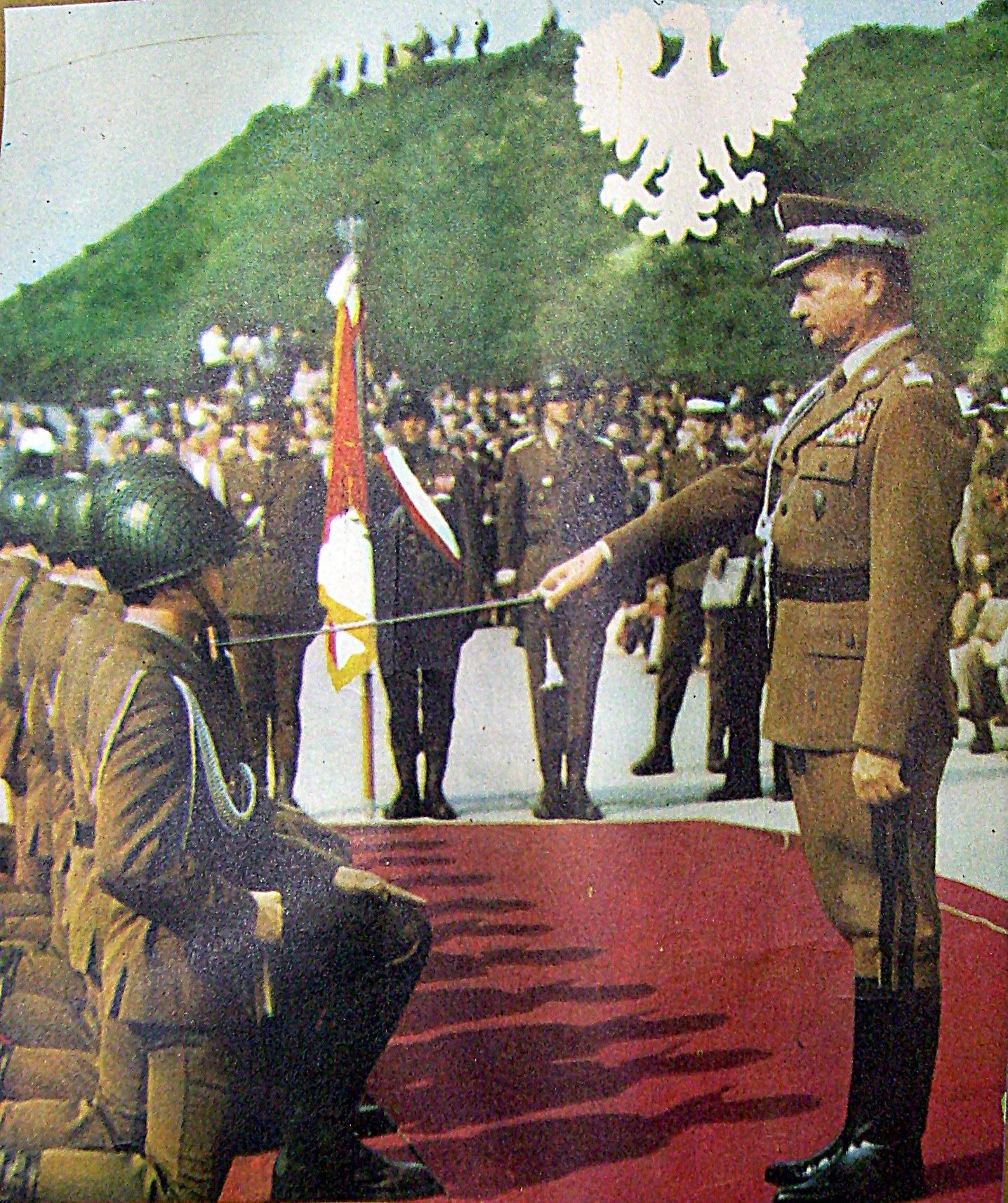
General Wojciech Jaruzelski in 1984

An anti-Zionist purge in the Polish Army took place in 1968 to systematically remove soldiers of Jewish origin, following the Six-Day War between Israel and Arab countries.

== Characteristics ==
=== Uniform ===
In 1949, the first fundamental uniform reform after the war was made. The "Dress Rules for the Soldiers of the Polish Army" were introduced and were to apply from January 1, 1951.

In the Polish People's Army, a soft field cap modeled on the pre-war one was introduced. After the war, the pre-war garrison caps were used again. Stiffened caps were only worn until around 1950 when they were completely replaced by round caps. In 1982, the Polish Rogatywka, modeled on the pattern from 1935, were restored in the Polish Army's Representative Company.

In the late 1950s, camouflaged field uniforms were introduced, starting with:

- wz. 58 "deszczyk" – used since 1958 to 1968.
- wz. 68 "moro" – used since 1968 to 1989.
- wz. 89 "puma" – incompletely implemented in 1989.

=== Chaplaincy ===
Throughout the entire period of the existence of the Polish People's Army, its officers and soldiers were provided with pastoral care. Such a service was provided by the General Dean's Office of the Polish Army.

=== Battle Honours ===
For Warsaw
For Battle of Berlin

=== Training ===
In the 1980s, the Polish People's Republic had 4 military academies and 11 higher officers' schools, which trained auxiliary corpsmen and corresponded in rank to higher educational institutions. In 1954, judo instructors from the Warsaw and Kraków institutes of physical culture, participated in the training program for border guards and military personnel of the airborne units of the Polish army.

== Equipment ==
Helmet	Origin	Type	Notes	Photo
SSh-39/SSh-40	Soviet Union	Combat helmet	Used during World War II and shortly after	
Hełm wz. 31/50	Polish People's Republic	Combat helmet	Pre-war polish helmet after modernisations	
Hełm wz. 50	Polish People's Republic	Combat helmet	Standard helmet in 1950-1967	
Hełm wz. 63	Polish People's Republic	Paratrooper helmet	Used by airbone troops and special units.	
Hełm wz. 67 Hełm wz. 67/75	Polish People's Republic	Combat helmet	Standard helmet from 1967 to 1989.	

Weapon	Origin	Type	Notes	Photo
P-64	Polish People's Republic	Semi-automatic pistol		
P-83	Polish People's Republic	Semi-automatic pistol		
P-33	Polish People's Republic	Semi-automatic pistol	Licensed copy of TT-33.	
AKM AKMS	Soviet Union Polish People's Republic	Assault rifle	Standard issue rifle	
PM-84	Polish People's Republic	Submachine gun	Limited use	
PM-63	Polish People's Republic	Submachine gun	Standard submachine gun form 1963 till 1989	
7.62 mm pm wz.41	Soviet Union Polish People's Republic	Submachine gun	Polish PPSh-41 produced domestically.	
SWD	Soviet Union	Designated sniper rifle	Standard marksman rifle of PPA	
PK	Soviet Union Polish People's Republic	General purpose machinegun	Standard general purpose machinegun of PPA	
SKS	Soviet Union	Semi-automatic rifle		
Mosin–Nagant	Soviet Union Polish People's Republic Russian Empire	Bolt-action rifle	Domestically produced.	
SG-43 Goryunov	Polish People's Republic Soviet Union	Machine gun		
RPG-7	Soviet Union Polish People's Republic	Light AT weapon		

=== Ground Forces ===
Tank	Origin	Version	In service	Notes
T-60	Soviet Union		3 pcs. - 1944-1945	After the war, several pieces were sent to military schools.
T-70	Soviet Union		53 pcs. - 1944-1945	Some of the tanks used after 1945 by the Internal Security Corps.
T-34	Soviet Union	1940, 1941, 1942, 1943	118 pcs. - 1944-1945	According to Magnuski, many different versions of the T-34 vehicle were used, both early production and modernized ones.
T-34-85	Soviet Union Polish People's Republic	M1, M2	328 pcs. - 1944–1945. 1083 pcs. - 1955, 1444 pcs. - 1960, 417 pcs. - 1985	Domestically produced 1355 pcs. between 1952 and 1956. In 1985, the military had 417 pieces of M1, M2 versions.
PT-76	Soviet Union	PT-76, PT-76B	68 pcs. - 1965, 108 pcs. - 1970, 112 pcs. - 1985, 30 pcs. 1990	Some of the tanks were modernized in Poland by adding a DSzK HMG above the loader's hatch.
T-54	Soviet Union Polish People's Republic	A, AD, AM, AM1, AM2, T-55U	1258 pcs. - 1965, 998 pcs. - 1970	Between 1956 and 1964, 2,000 T-54 tanks were produced under license in Poland.
T-55	Soviet Union Polish People's Republic	A, AD, AD-1, AD-2, AM, AD1M, AD2M, AMS	128 pcs. - 1965, 956 pcs. - 1970, 2653 pcs., 2100 pcs. - 1990	Between 1964 and 1980, 5,000 T-55s were produced. Most of it was exported.
T-72	Soviet Union Polish People's Republic	M, M1	317 pcs. - 1985, 700 pcs. - 1990	In the years 1981–1990, Zakłady Mechaniczne Bumar-Łabędy produced approximately 1,600 T-72 tanks.
IS-2	Soviet Union	M	50 pcs. - 1944–1945, 180 pcs. - 1955, 75 pcs. - 1960	Withdrawn from use in the 1960s.
IS-3	Soviet Union		2 or 3 pcs.	Brought for testing purposes. They did not come into use. Two copies have been preserved in museums in Poznań and Warsaw.

TD/SPG	Origin	Version	In service	Notes
SU-57	USA Soviet Union	SPG	15 pcs. - 1944–1945, Few pcs. survived war.	Withdrawn from use in the 1950s.
SU-76	Soviet Union	SPG	130 pcs. - 1944–1945, 206 pcs. - 1955.	Withdrawn from use in the 1950s.
SU-85	Soviet Union	TD	70 pcs. - 1944–1945, 51 pcs. - 1955, 43 pcs. - 1960	Withdrawn from use in the 1960s.
SU-100	Soviet Union	TD	At least 3 pcs. - 1943-1945	Withdrawn from use in the 1950s.
ISU-122S	Soviet Union	SPG	32 pcs. – 1944–1945, 399 pcs. (together with ISU-152) – 1955, 49 pcs. – 1960	Withdrawn from use in the 1960s.
SU-152	Soviet Union	SPG	3 pcs. - 1944-1945	
ISU-152	Soviet Union	SPG	10 pcs. – 1944–1945, 399 pcs. (together with ISU-122S) – 1955	Withdrawn from use in the 1950s.
ASU-85	Soviet Union	SPG	20-30 pcs. - 1965-1975	Withdrawn from use in the second half of 1970s.
2S1 Goździk	Soviet Union Polish People's Republic	SPG	166 pcs. - 1985, 490 pcs. - 1990	Licensed production launched in the 1980s at Huta Stalowa Wola.
wz.77 DANA	Czechoslovak Socialist Republic	SPG		The first copies appeared in WP in the mid-1980s.

APC/IFV	Origin	Version	In service	Notes
BWP-1	Soviet Union Polish People's Republic	IFV	1 400	
BMP-2	Soviet Union	IFV	62	Sold to Angola after communism fell in country.
MT-LB	Soviet Union	APC	15	
TOPAS	Czechoslovakia Polish People's Republic	WPT-TOPAS, -2AP, R-2, R-3	120 pcs. - 1968, 70 pcs. - 1990	Jointly developed by Poland and Czechoslovakia
SKOT	Czechoslovakia Polish People's Republic	-1A, -2A, S-260 Art, S-260 Inż., -WPT, -2AP, R-1, R-2, R2M, R2AM, R-3, R-3M, R-3AM, R-4, R-6	548 pcs. - 1966 2 500 total production form Polish Army	Jointly developed by Poland and Czechoslovakia between 1963 and 1971.
BTR-60	Soviet Union	PU-12		Included with the 9K33 Osa SAM system delivered between 1980 and 1985.
BRDM-1	Soviet Union			The first ones entered the army in the 1960s
BRDM-2	Soviet Union	9P133, 9P148, RS, 9P31	800 pcs. - 1990	
FUG	Hungarian People's Republic			The first ones entered the army in the 1960s

=== Air Force ===
Model	Origin	Type	In service	Notes
Lim-1	Polish People's Republic	Fighter	227	
Lim-2	Polish People's Republic	Fighter	500	
Lim-5	Polish People's Republic	Fighter	477	
MiG-19	Soviet Union	Fighter	33	
MiG-21	Soviet Union	Fighter	600	
MiG-23	Soviet Union	Fighter	40	
MiG-29	Soviet Union	Fighter	12	
Sukhoi Su-7	Soviet Union	Attack Aircraft	50	
Su-20	Soviet Union	Attack Aircraft	40	
Sukhoi Su-22	Soviet Union	Attack Aircraft	110	
Ilyushin Il-28	Soviet Union	Bomber	80	
Antonov An-2	Soviet Union	Transport	N/A	
Antonov An-26	Soviet Union	Transport	20	
Ilyushin Il-14	Soviet Union	Transport	30	
Mil Mi-8	Soviet Union	Helicopter	80	
Mil Mi-2	Soviet Union	Helicopter	200	
Mil Mi-24	Soviet Union	Attack helicopter	40	

=== Artillery ===
==== Rocket Artillery ====
- RM-70- 30
- BM-21 Grad-250 in 1980s.
- 9K52 Luna-M- 40 launchers in 1980s
- R-11 Zemlya - 22 launchers in 1960s
- Scud B- 25 launchers in 1980s

==== Towed artillery ====
- 76 mm divisional gun M1942 (ZiS-3)
- 122 mm howitzer M1938 (M-30)- 715
- 152 mm gun-howitzer D-20-166

===== Selfpropelled artillery =====
- 2S1 Gvozdika-498
- 152 mm SpGH DANA- 111
- 2S7 Pion-8

=== Air defense ===
==== Mobile missile ====
- 2K12 Kub
- 2K11 Krug
- 9K33 Osa

==== Mobile self-propelled AA guns ====
- ZSU-23-4 Shilka-150 were delivered from USSR until 1991

Towed anti-aircraft gun

- ZU-23-2-252 ZU-23 and 72 ZUR-23-2 series

=== Artillery tractors ===
- Mazur D-350
- ATS-59
- AT-T

=== Utility vehicles ===
- Willys MB
- Gaz-67
- Gaz-69
- UAZ-469
- FSC Lublin-51
- Gaz-66
- Ził-130
- Ził-131
- Ził-157
- KrAZ-255
- Star 28/29
- Star 66
- Star 660
- Star 200
- Star 244
- Star 266

== Engagements ==
- Battle of Lenino - 1943
- Lublin–Brest offensive - 1944
- Battle of Studzianki - 1944
- Vistula-Oder offensive - 1945
- Battle of Kolberg - 1945
- Siege of Danzig - 1945
- Battle of the Seelow Heights - 1945
- Battle of Bautzen - 1945
- Battle of Berlin - 1945
- Anti-communist resistance in Poland (1944–1946)
- Battles for Bircza - 1945–1946
- Operation Vistula - 1947
- Poznań protests of 1956
- Warsaw Pact invasion of Czechoslovakia - 1968
- Polish protests of 1970
- Pacification of Wujek - 1981
- Martial law in Poland (13 December 1981 – 22 July 1983)

== See also ==
- Air Force of the Polish Army
- Polish Armed Forces
- Polish Armed Forces (Second Polish Republic)
- Main Directorate of Information of the Polish Army (GZI WP)
- Internal Military Service (WSW)
- Border Protection Forces (WOP)
- Polish Legions (Napoleonic period)
- Polish Military Organisation
- Armia Ludowa
- Gwardia Ludowa
- Polish forces in the West
- Polish forces in the East
  - Anders' Army
- First Polish Army (1944–1945)

== Sources ==
- Smith, Joseph E. (1969). Small Arms of the World (11 ed.). Harrisburg, Pennsylvania: The Stackpole Company. ISBN 9780811715669.
- The Military Balance 2017. Arundel House, Temple Place, London, UK: International Institute for Strategic Studies (IISS). 2017. ISBN 978-1-85743-900-7. OCLC 960838207 – via Routledge.
