= Romanian M73 helmet =

Steel helmet used by the army of Romania

Helmet model 1973
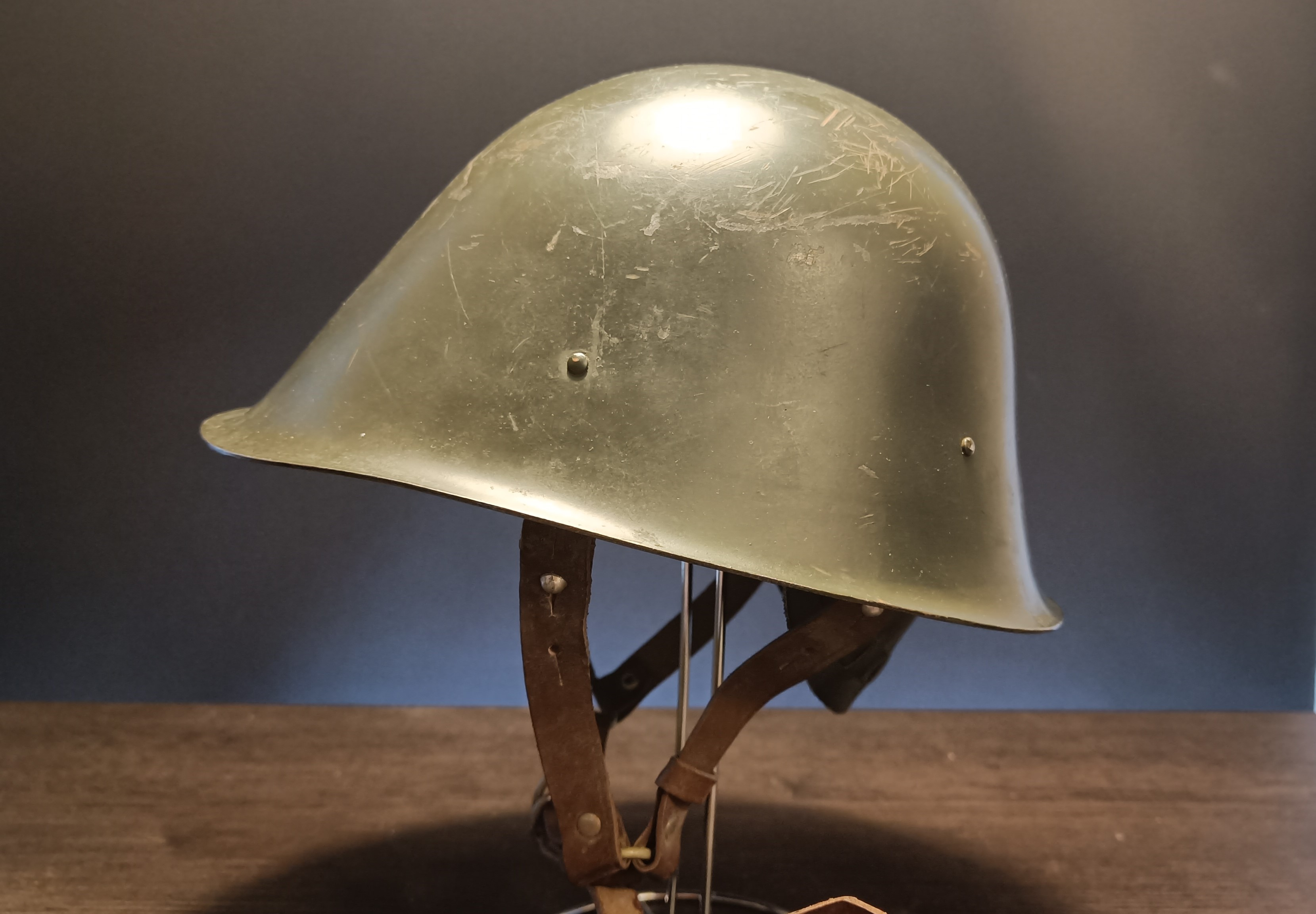
- M73 helmet
- Type: Military helmet
- Place of origin: Romania

Service history
- In service: 1973-1989
- Used by: See Users
- Wars: Romanian revolution War in Afghanistan (2001-2021)

Specifications
- Weight: 1,3 kg

The Model 1973 (Romanian: Casca model 1973) is a Romanian steel helmet used by the army of Romania, introduced in 1973 in the Army of the Socialist Republic of Romania.

== History ==
In the 1960s and 1970s, the Socialist Republic of Romania (despite being a Soviet satellite state) wanted to operate more independently from the USSR, which caused tension between Moscow and Bucharest. This complicated relationship between Romania and the USSR further worsened after the Sino-Soviet split and when Nicolae Ceaușescu became head of the Romanian party and throughout the 1960s and 70s, Romania stressed its distance from Moscow. This resulted in a need to restructure the army and therefore its uniform/helmet needed a replacement.

The Army of the Socialist Republic of Romania had been using copies of the Soviet SSh-40 since the 1950s (replacing the Dutch-based M38/39) therefore, it seemed logical to adopt a new helmet based on the previous M39, to further distance the look of the army from the other armies of the Warsaw Pact and USSR (although it seems that some attempts at reintroducing the M39 back into service were made). This would become the helmet model 1973, presumably adopted in 1973. After the fall of the Socialist Republic of Romania in 1989, the M73 was gradually phased out of front-line service, being replaced with more modern Kevlar helmets.

== Design ==
The Romanian M73 is influenced by the earlier Romanian M39 (which itself was a copy of the Dutch M34) The M73 dimensions are smaller overall than those found on the M39. The dimensions of the M73 helmet are a length of 27,5 cm, a width of 23,5 cm, a height of 14,5 cm, and a weight of 1.3 kg. M73 also has a smaller and less flared skirt compared to the M39 and has a raw edge instead of the rolled edge of the M39. The M73 only has 4 rivets instead of the 7 of the M39 and the rivets themselves are also smaller than those found on the M39.

Both helmets have similar liners. The M73 has four large leather flaps backed by felt that cover the entire interior of the helmet between the leather flaps and the felt, is a band of white leather to further increase comfort (on this white leather is usually manufacturing year and factory stamps) instead the M39 has three leather flaps with six smaller tongues backed by pieces of felt, covering only part of the interior. The adjustable nape strap at the back of the M39 is retained, but enlarged becoming more of a flap, adjusted by a strap and a buckle. The hole at the rear of the skirt used for attaching the helmet to a backpack, is also a feature retained from the M39. Unique is the Adjustable 4-point chin strap with a double D-ring to secure it, not seen on the M39 or M34.

== Airborne variant ==
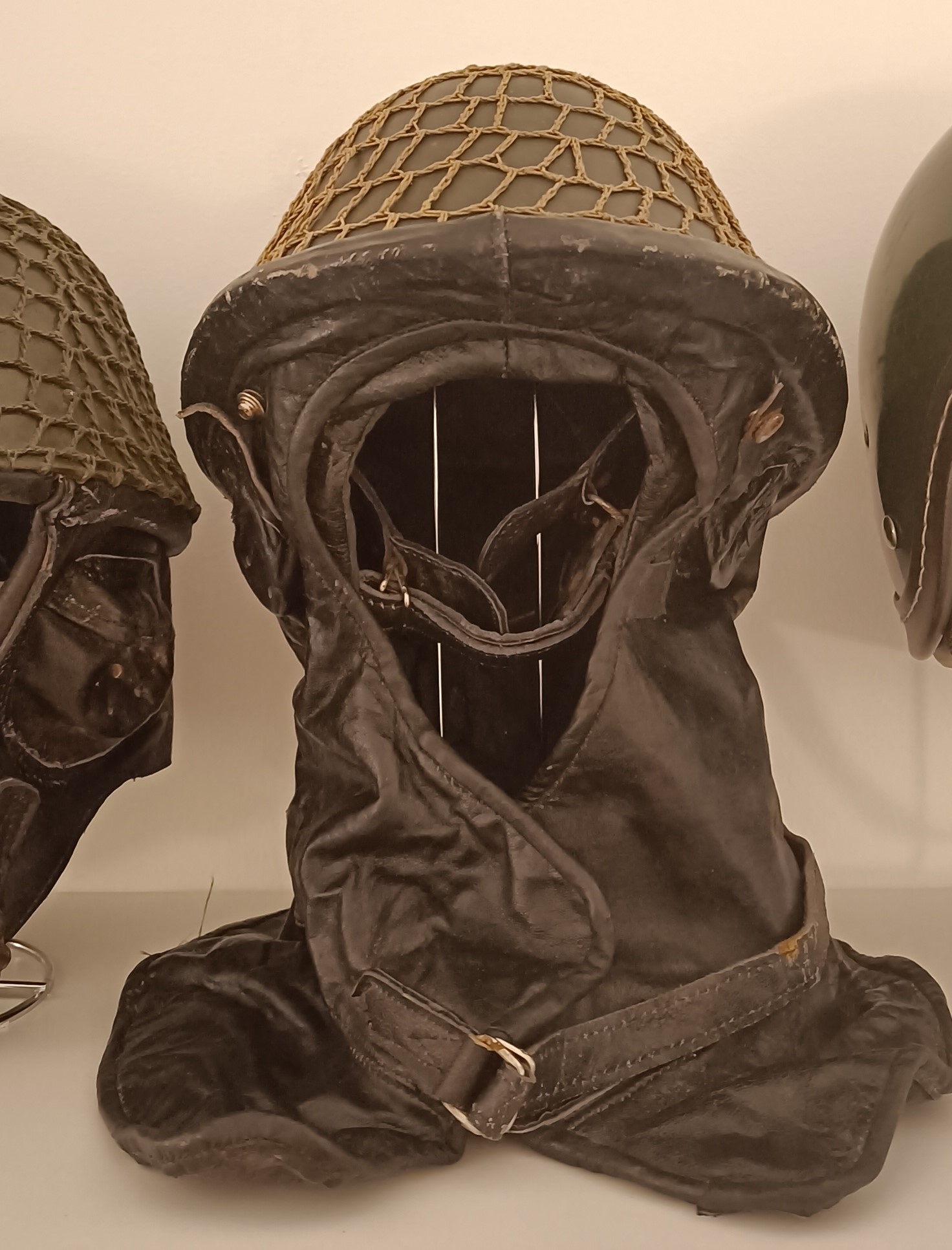
Airborne M73, Model 1

M73 Airborne is a paratrooper variant of the standard M73 helmet.

The first version of the airborne helmet was the Helmet Model 1 which has the same shell as the standard M73 but with an attached large leather sleeve/cowl guard covering the entire neck, fully enclosing the head for better protection when opening the parachute. The Model 1 was used until the mid-1980s.

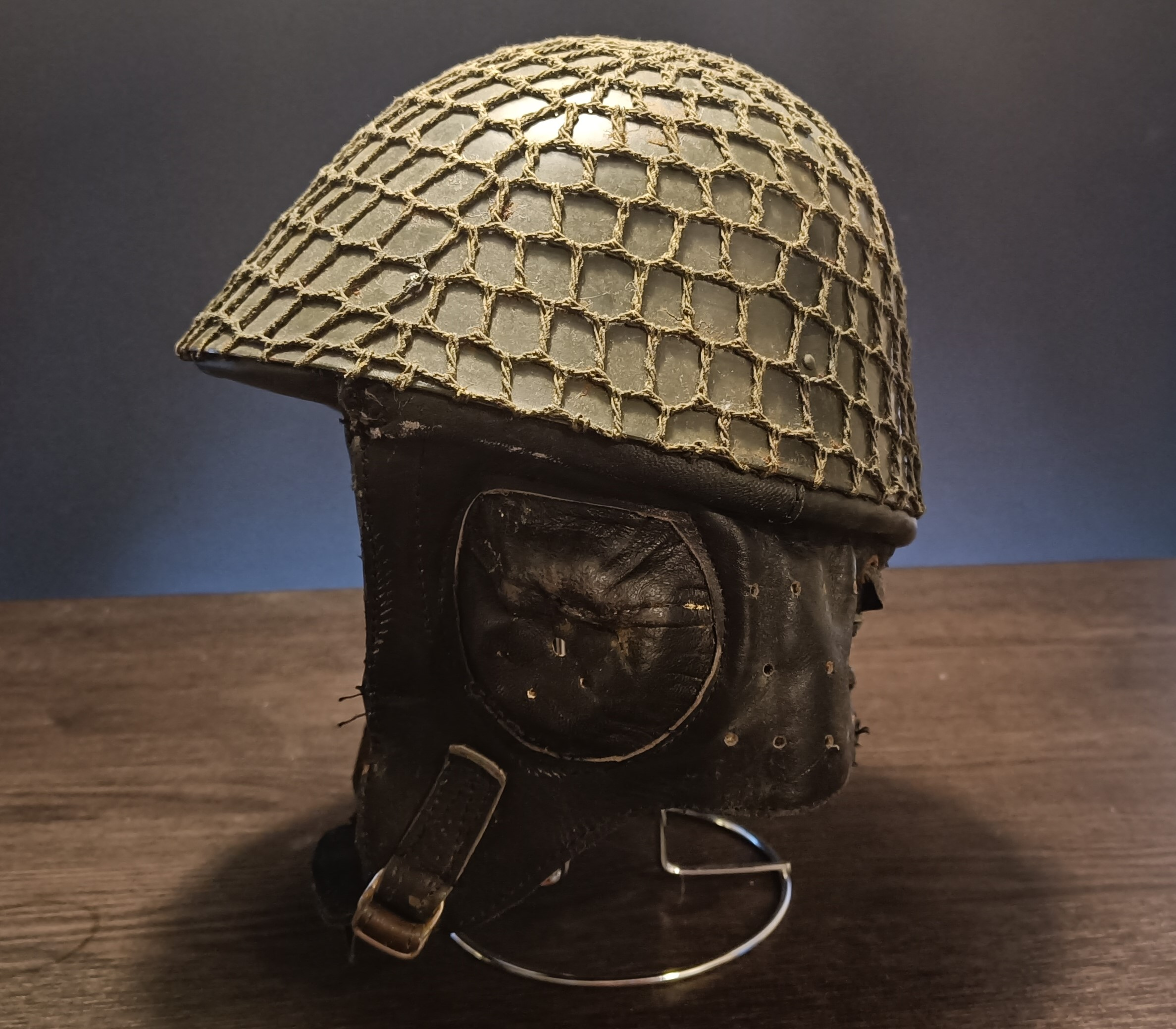
Airborne M73, Model 2

The second and more numerous variant is Model 2. The shell of Model 2 is an M73 shell cut down to the inner lining fixing rivets, with an attached leather ear and neck guard replacing the four-point chin strap. (Note: The ear and neck guards of the airborne Model 2 are very reminiscent of those found on the Polish Hełm wz. 63.) For added shock-absorbing the helmet has additional padding along the periphery of the helmet and on the sides of the ear guards, are cups designed for the use of headphones. Model 2 comes in two different liners, one is almost identical to the standard M73 liner with the four leather tongues being slightly smaller, and the other is an 8-tongued liner (both liners were produced with or without ventilation holes). Most M73 airborne helmets feature camouflage netting but are often used without.

M73 Airborne helmets were produced from 1978 to 1989 and are still in limited use today with the Romanian Armed Forces (mainly for training), being gradually replaced with helmets such as the Future Assault Shell Technology helmet and Schuberth M100 ballistic helmet.

== Users ==
=== Current ===
- Romania - the M73 is still in limited use as a training helmet.

=== Former ===
- Islamic Republic of Afghanistan - Romania donated at least 35,000 M73 helmets to Afghanistan for use by the Afghan National Army, but these helmets were already phased out of service by the Fall of Kabul (2021).
- Socialist Republic of Romania - the M73 was used as the primary infantry helmet of the Socialist Republic of Romania and by Romanian paratroopers from 1973 until 1989.

== Gallery ==
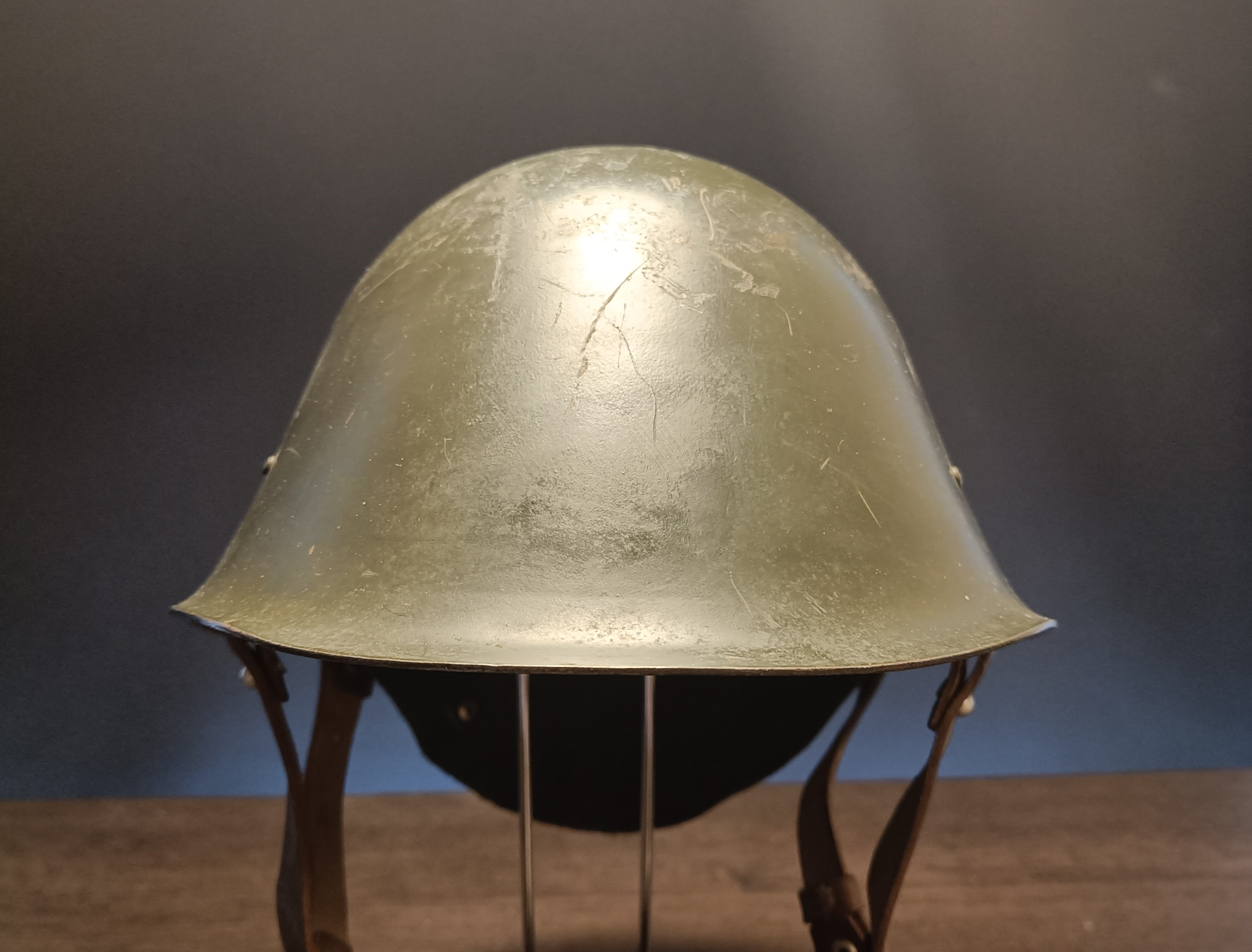
M73 Helmet front

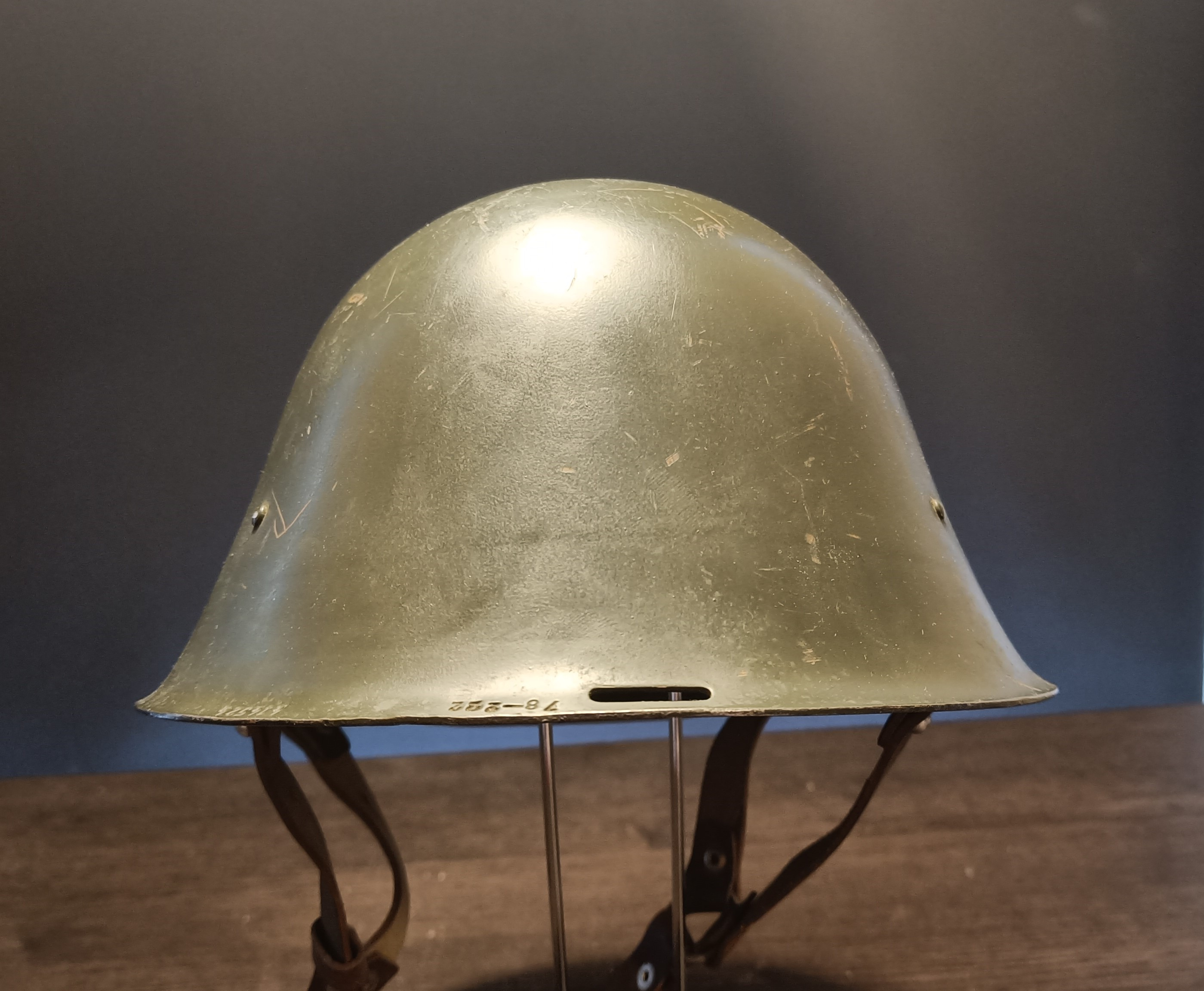
M73 Helmet rear

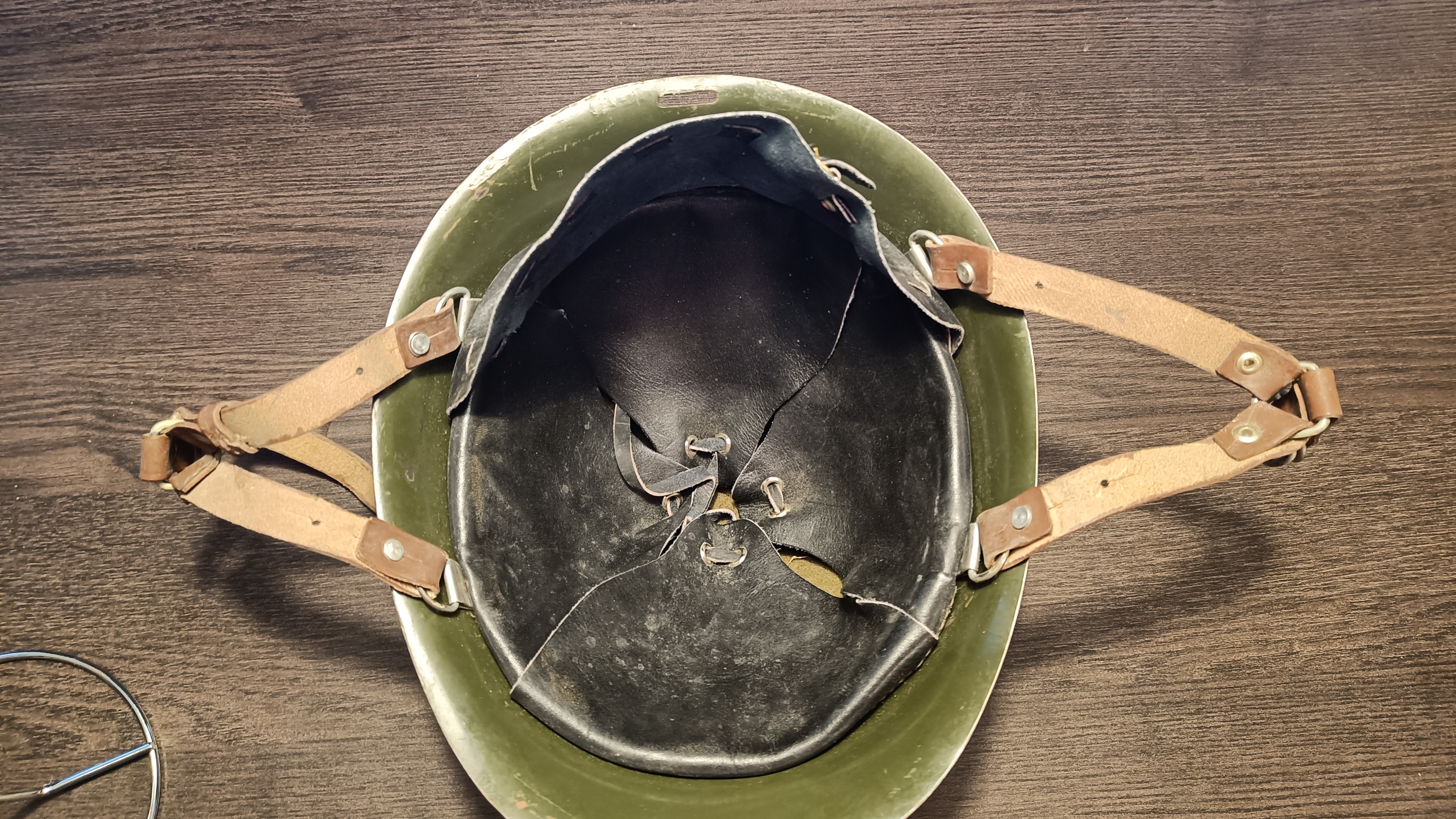
M73 Helmet liner

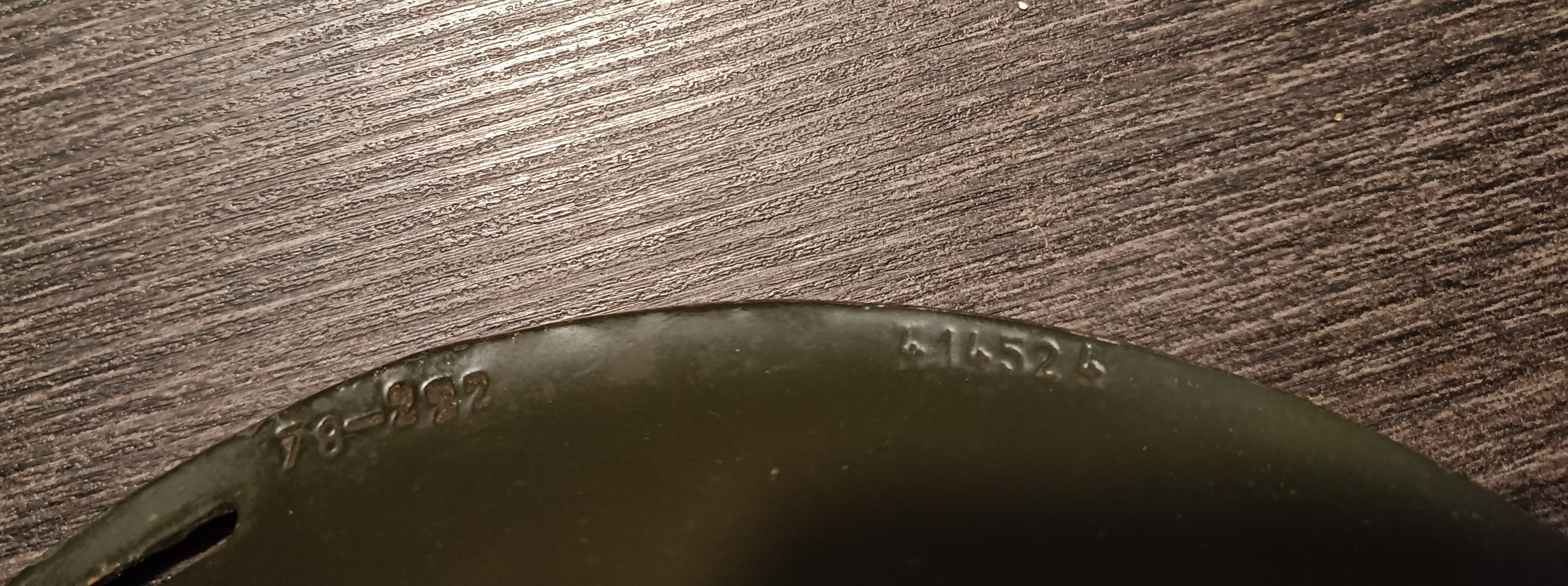
Manufacturing numbers and years of production are stamped on the back of the M73s Skirt

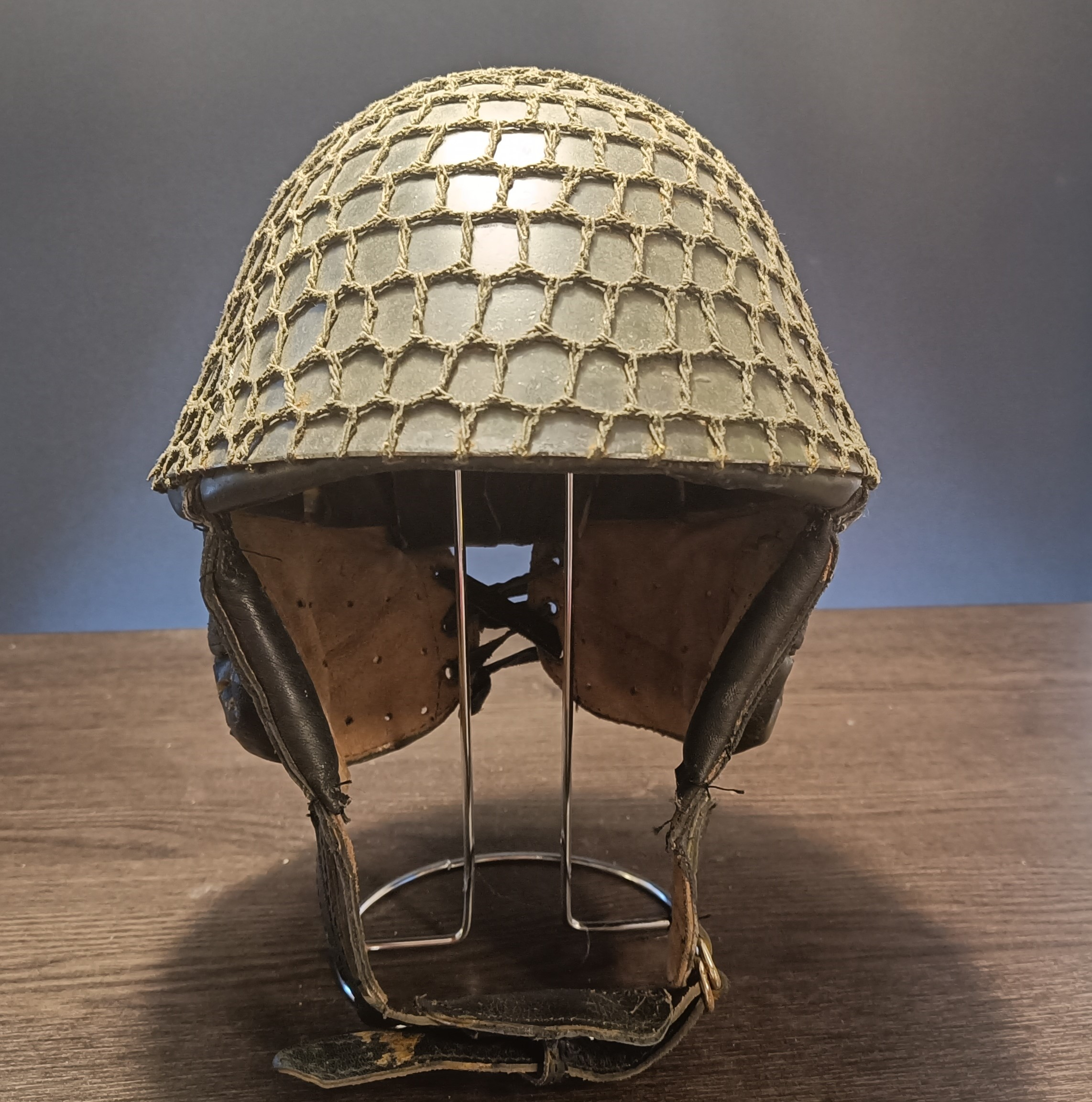
M73 Airborne Helmet Model 2 front

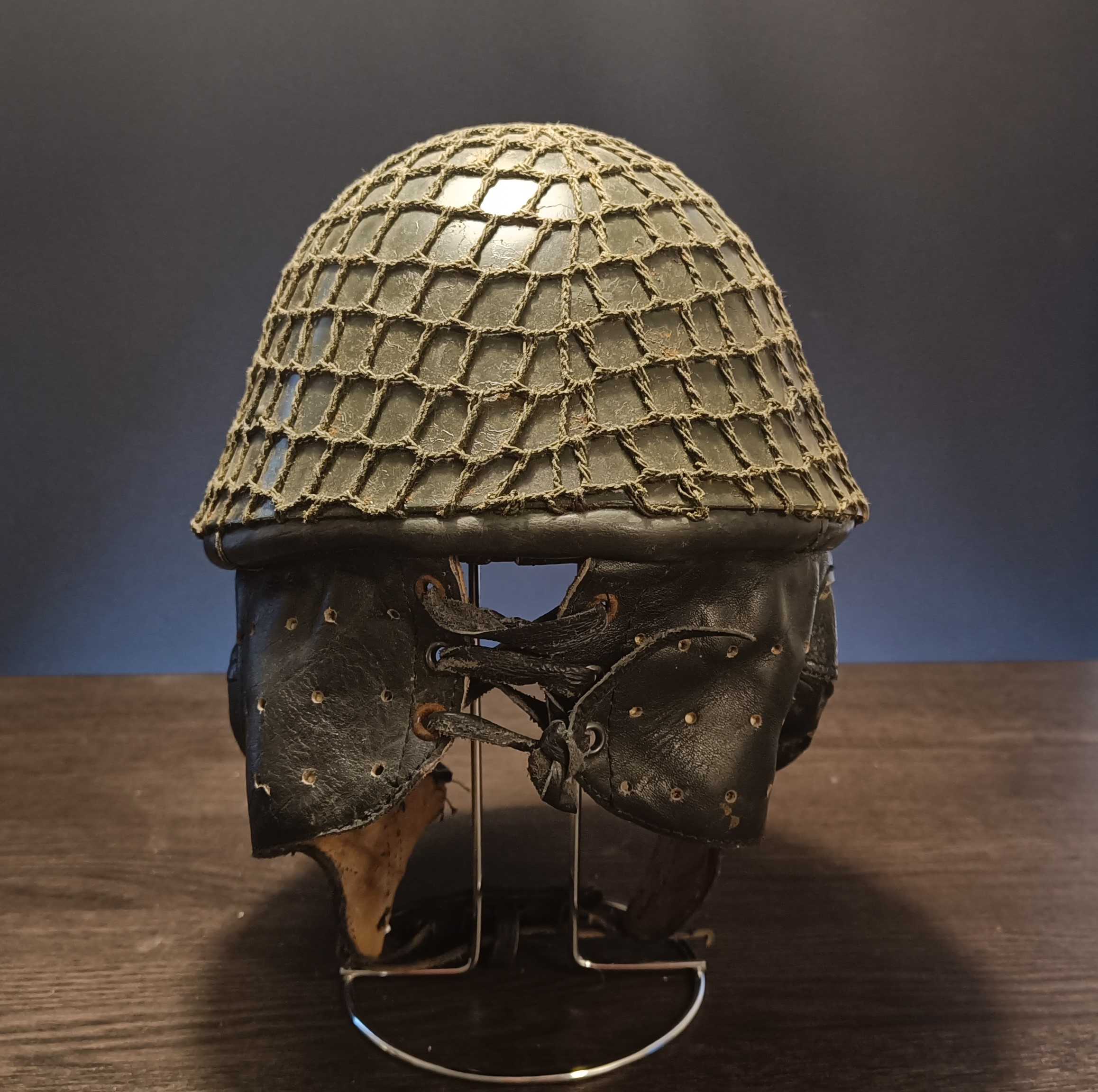
M73 Airborne Helmet Model 2 rear

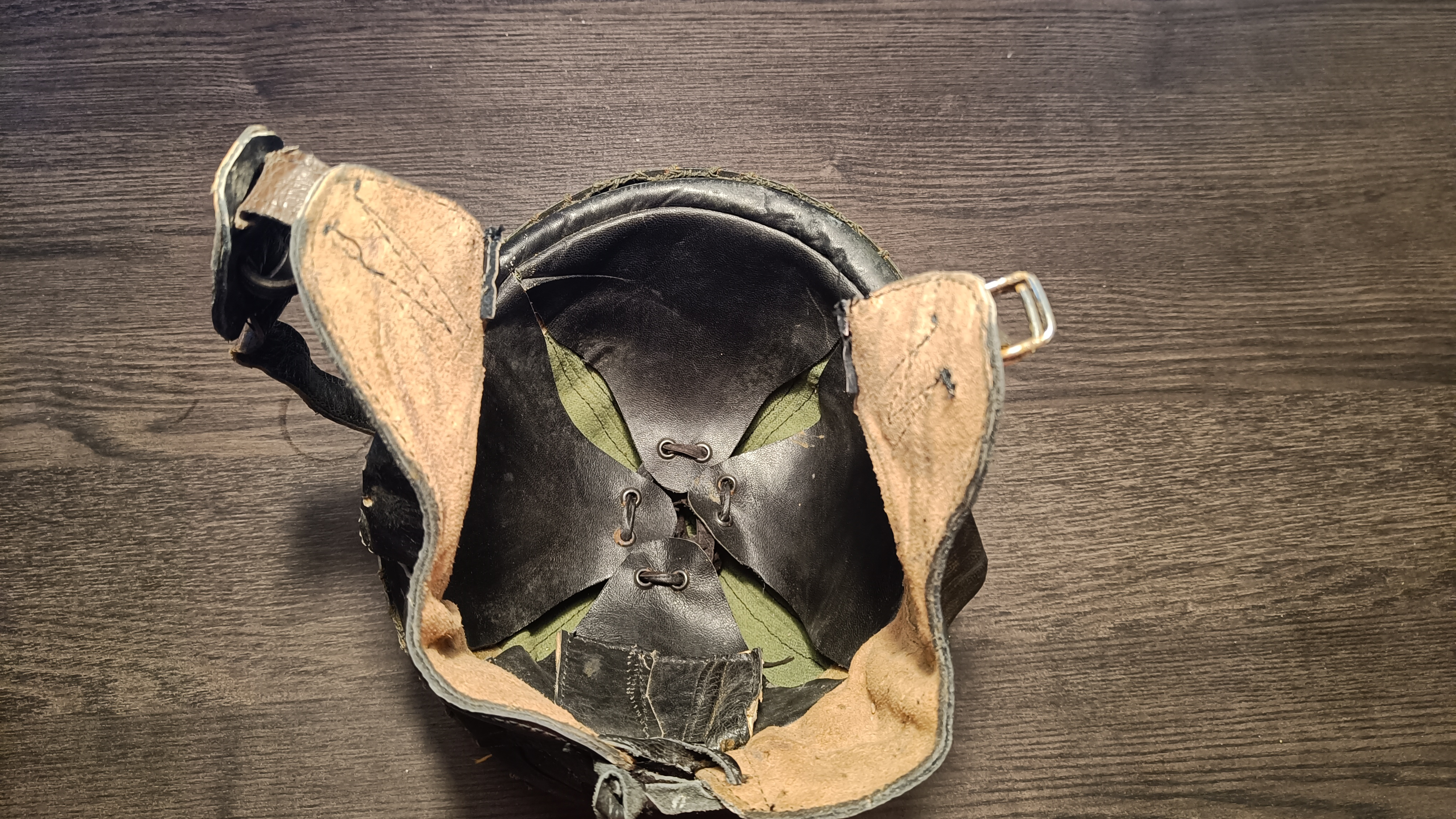
M73 Airborne Helmet Model 2 liner

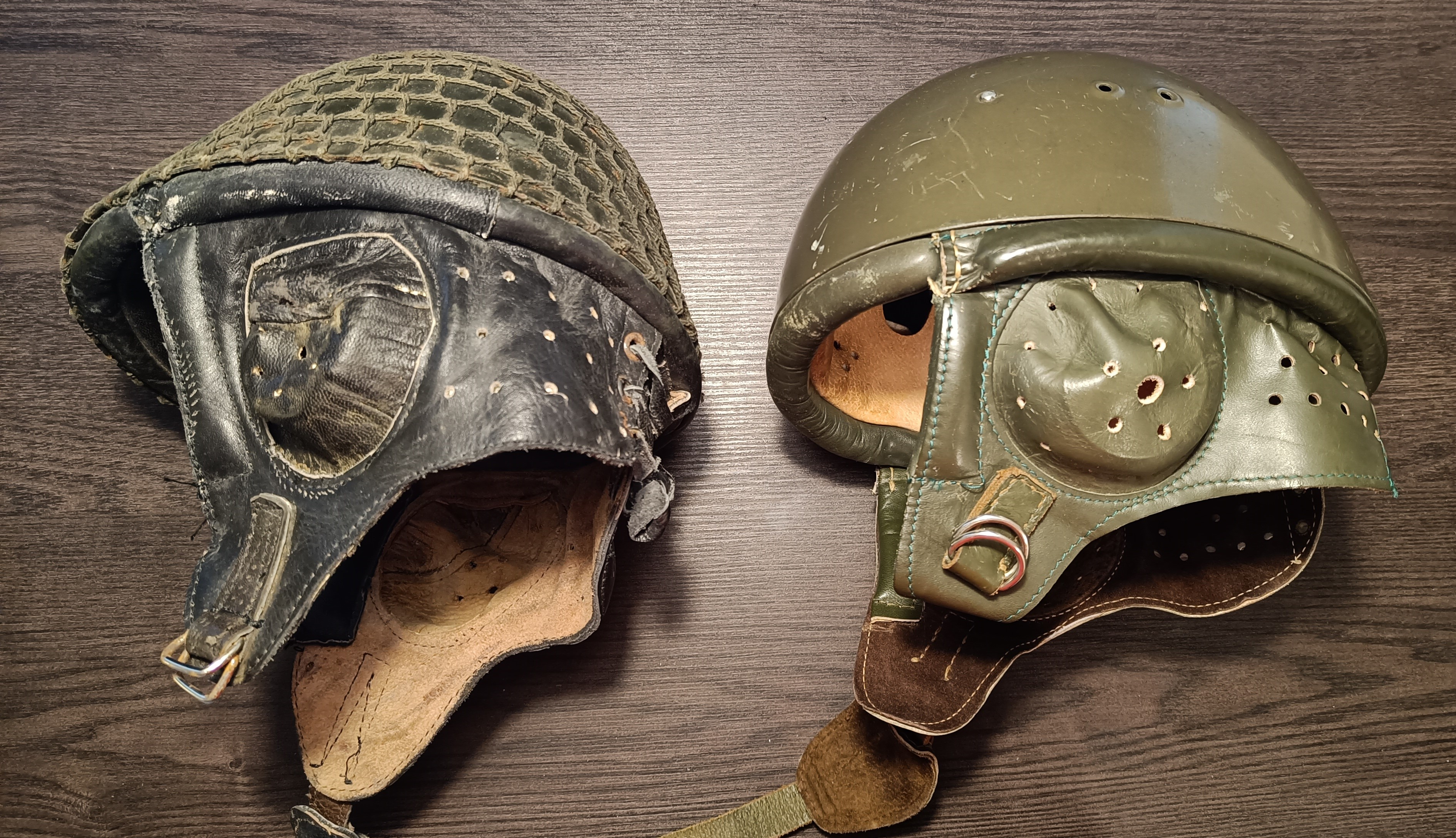
Comparison between Romanian M73 Airborne Model 2 and the polish Hełm wz. 63
