= Netherlands M34 =

Netherlands steel combat helmet

M34 Helmet
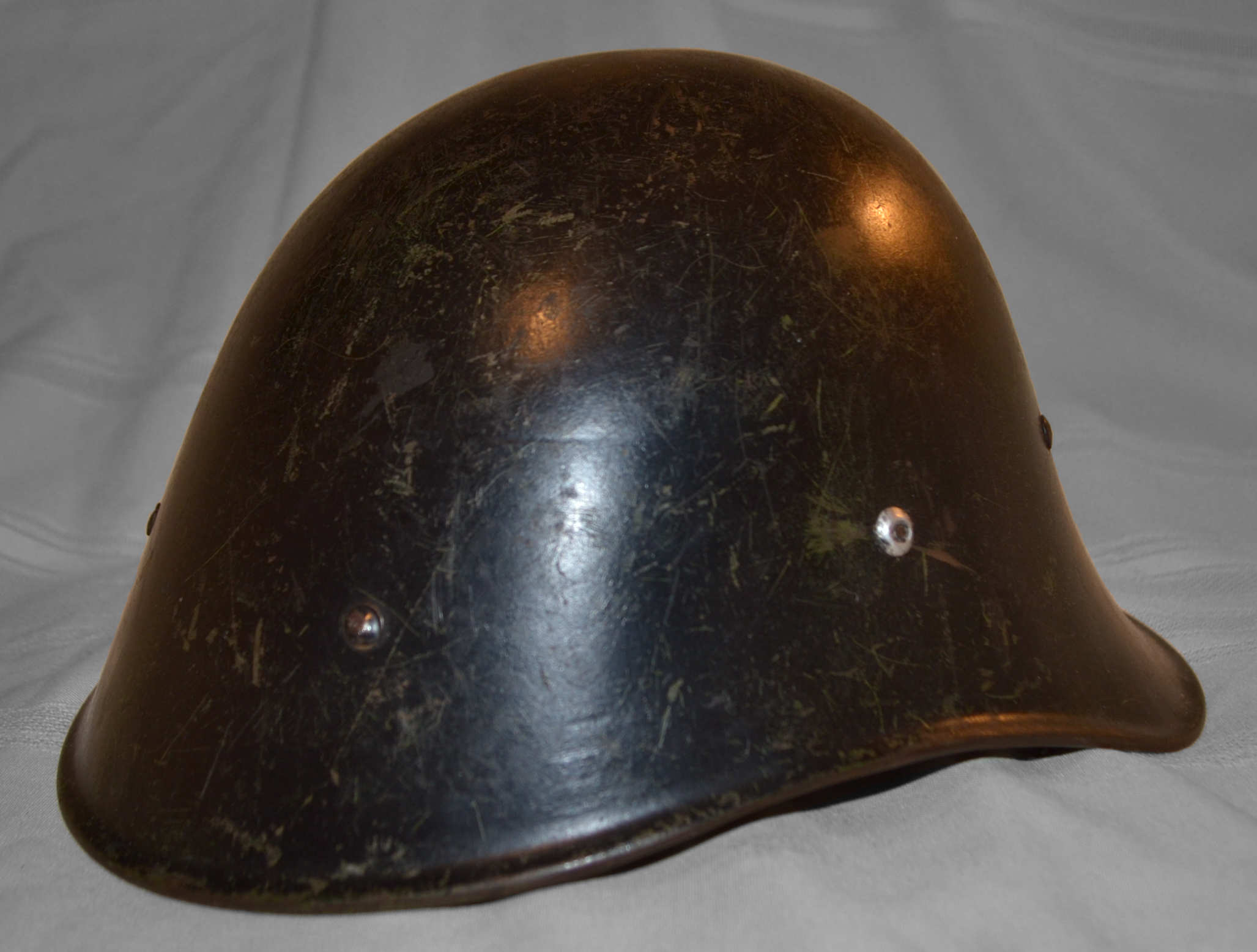
- Dutch M34 Helmet, note the removal of the front badge and coat of black paint instead of green.
- Type: Combat helmet
- Place of origin: Netherlands

Service history
- In service: 1934–1949
- Used by: Netherlands; Germany; Romania; Indonesia
- Wars: German invasion of the Netherlands Second World War; Indonesian National Revolution

Production history
- Produced: 1934–1940
- Variants: KNIL model

The M34 (Also known as M1934) is a steel combat helmet used by the Netherlands from its introduction in 1934 replacing the previous M23/27, to the invasion by Nazi Germany in 1940. From which it was replaced by the M53 helmet, a local copy of the American M1 helmet. A tropical variant of this helmet was produced for use by the Dutch East India Army in present-day Indonesia known as the KNIL model.

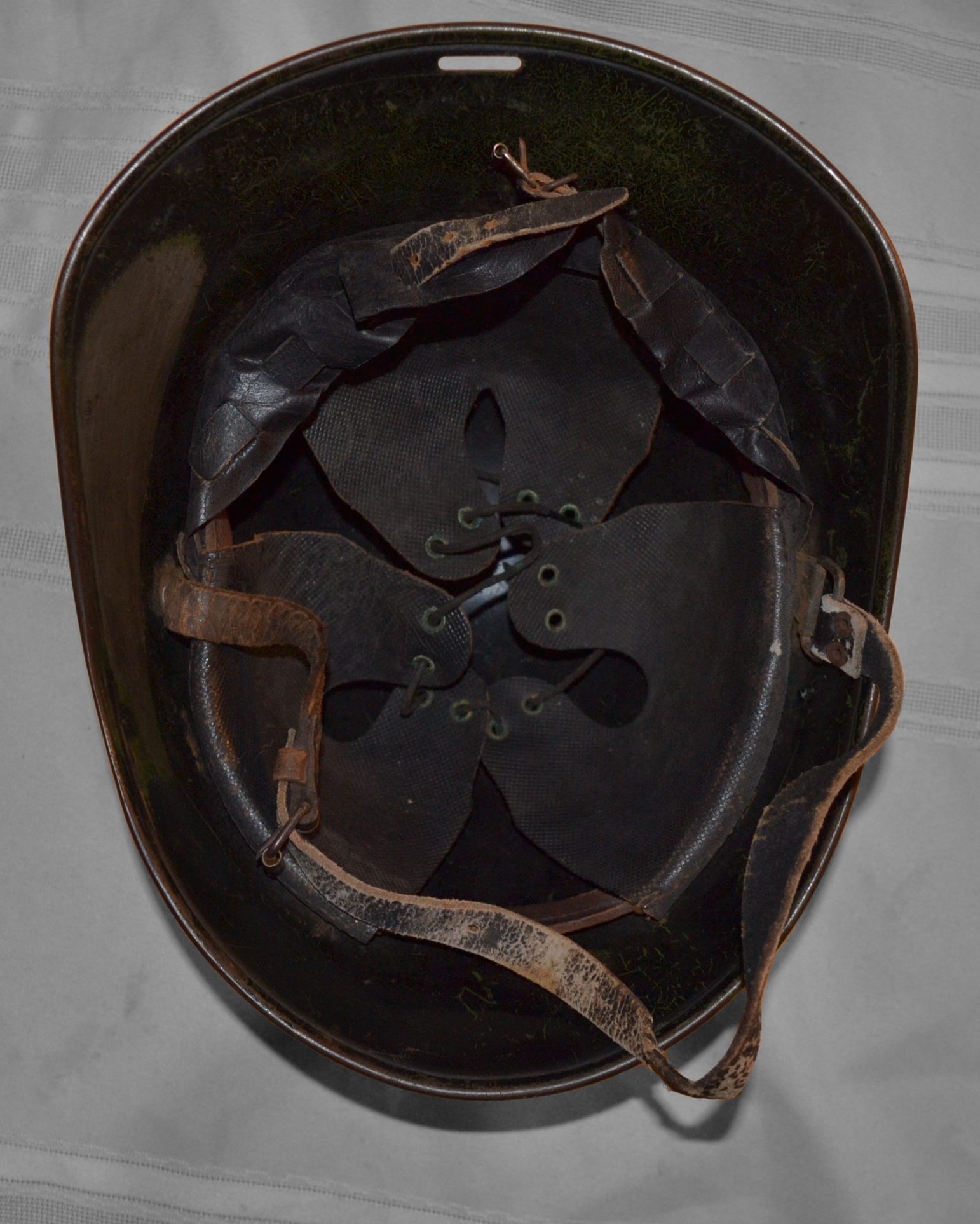
M34 Liner, notice the rear nape strap and helmet clip hole.

== Design ==
The shell has an unusual shape compared to other helmets of this period. Unlike the many designs of this period being based around the Brodie, Adrian, and Stahlhelm bases. The M34 being an upgraded version of the previous M23/27, having shorter sides and a heavier weight to the M23/27. The shell having a swooping shape and a rolled rim, painted green with an oval bronze badge on the front painted black with the emblem of the Dutch army on it. Helmets used by the Nazis would have the frontal badge removed. The liner consisted of three leather pads attached to a leather band that was affixed to the shell by means of seven rivets. The liner also has a nape strap along the back for further adjustment of size. At the very rear of the skirt a hole was made so that the helmet when not in use could be held in place with a clamp on either the uniform or rucksack. The chin strap being a roller buckle assembly appended to the liner and shell.

== KNIL variant ==
A version of the M34 was made for the Royal Netherlands East India Army (Koninklijk Nederlands Indisch Leger, KNIL). Produced by the Milwaukee Saddlery Company in the United States. The new model was christened the M38 and featured a trimmed rear skirt, omission of the front badge, a large rear neck flap, and ventilation holes in the liner pads for increased comfort in the hot East Indies. Aside from the changes listed above, the model was nearly identical to the M34.

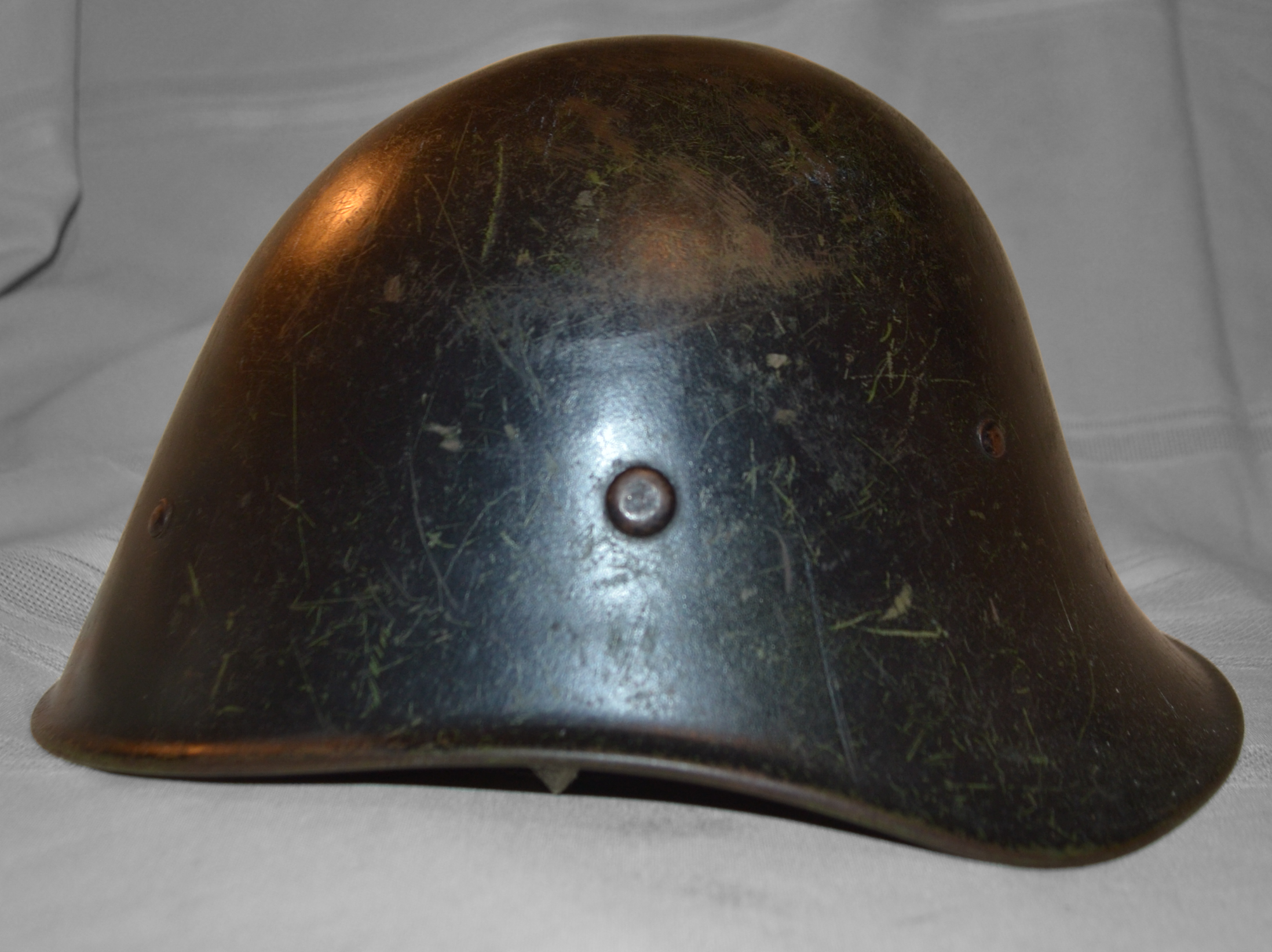
M34 Profile, the M34 having a more pronounced swoop in the general shape along the rim and rear of the shell.

== Romanian use ==
The Kingdom of Romania would order 628,000 M34s from the Dutch for use in its army and name it the M39. This model, produced in the Verblifa Factory in the Netherlands in 1938, was painted green and featured on the front the crest of King Carol II of Romania. Once Carol II abdicated the crests were ordered to be removed and new production helmets did not feature the crest, but this order was followed idly. Germany continued to supply Dutch issue M34 and older M23/27 helmets to the Romanians with the Dutch crests removed, sometimes these helmets would have the German M31 liner instead of the original. The design of the M34 and its use by the Romanian as the M39 would go on to influence the future M73 and M73/80 helmets worn by The Socialist Republic of Romania.
