= Hełm wz. 63 =

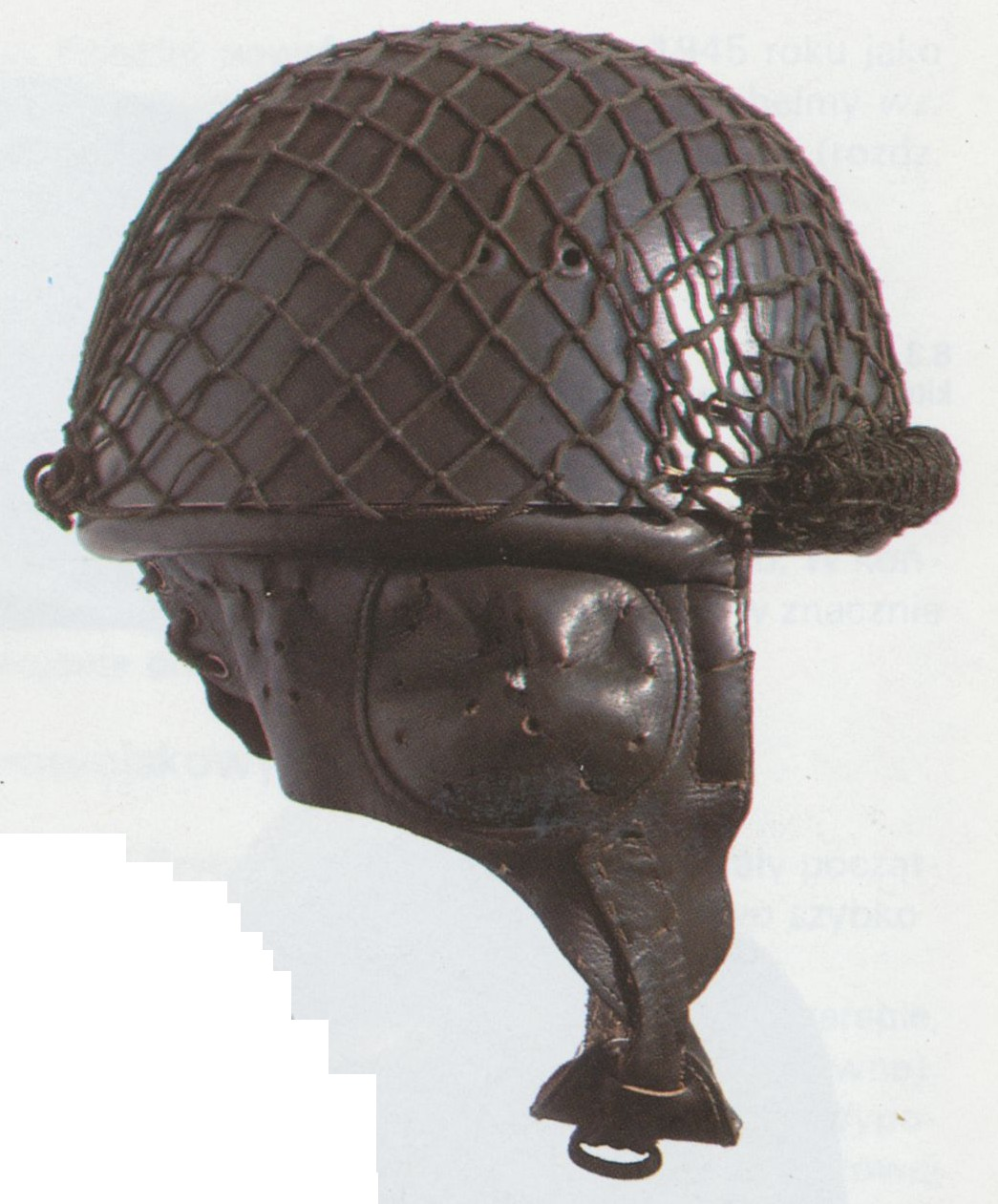
- wz. 63 helmet
- Type: Paratrooper helmet
- Place of origin: Polish People's Republic

Service history
- In service: 1963-2015 (Polish Army)
- Used by: See Users
- Wars: Warsaw Pact invasion of Czechoslovakia; Iran–Iraq War; Gulf War

Production history
- Designed: 1963
- Manufacturer: Huta Silesia
- Produced: 1963-1985

Specifications
- Weight: 1,5 kg (3,307 lbs)

The Hełm wz. 63 is a Polish steel helmet designed for airborne troops introduced in the 1963. It was used by Polish People's Army, National People's Army and Iraqi Army. In the Polish Armed Forces , wz. 63 helmet was replaced by the HP-03 helmet in 2015.

== Design ==
The wz. 63 helmet has the shape of an oval bowl without a visor and a nape. The dimensions of the body are: height 140 mm, length 245 mm (after changes 243 mm), width 206 mm (after changes 213 mm). The weight of the helmet with full equipment is approx. 1.5 kg. There are ventilation holes in the helmet: two on each side.

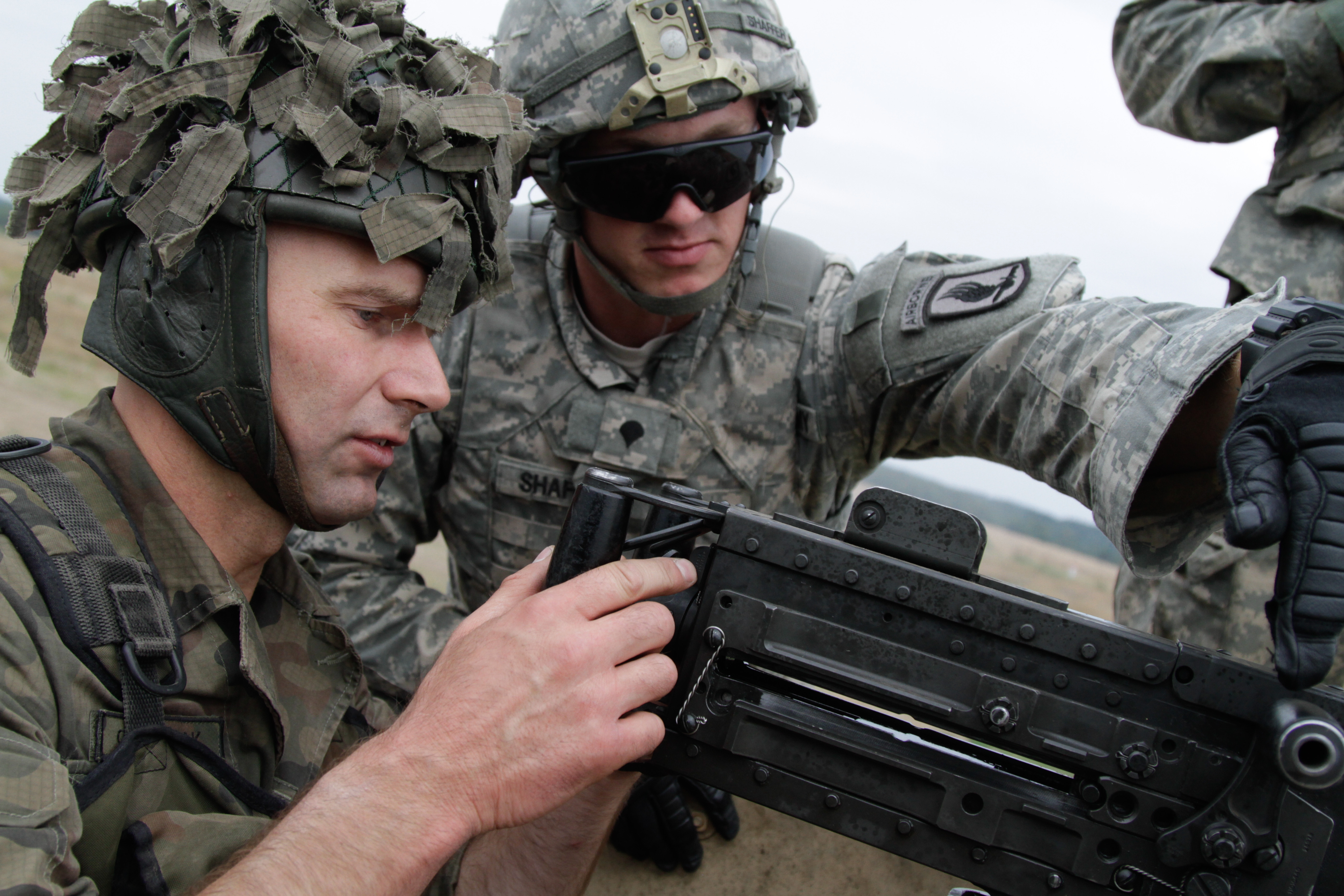
Polish soldier wearing wz. 63 helmet, 2014

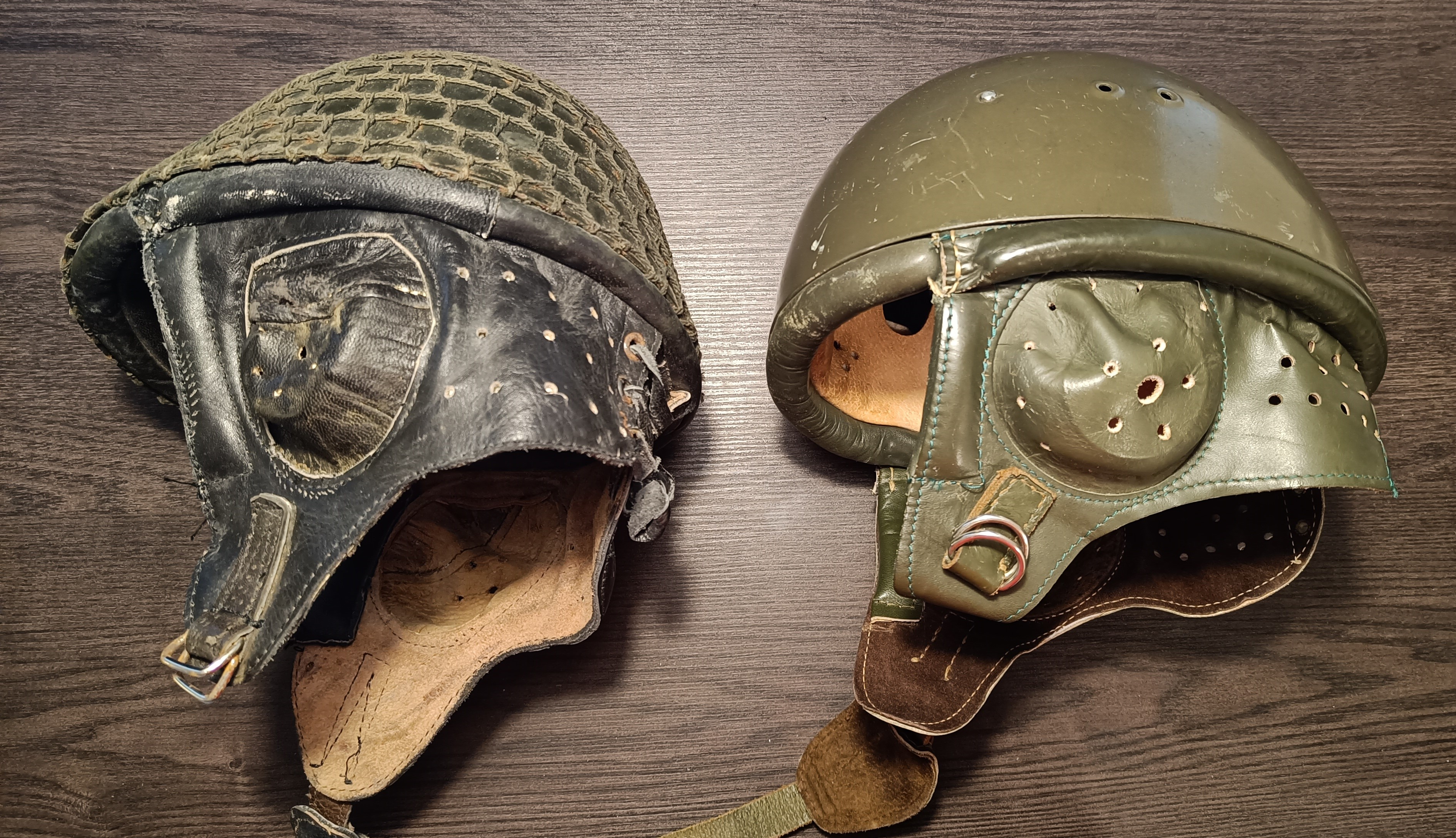
Comparison between Romanian M73 Airborne Model 2 and the Hełm wz. 63

The fascia is almost identical to that of the wz. 50, the difference is the use of an additional shock absorber in the form of a foam pad. In addition, the helmet uses a shock-absorbing shaft (along the periphery of the helmet, it protrudes slightly to protect against a sharp edge) and a leather pilot cap (shorter than in motorcycle helmets). On the sides of the pilot there are pockets for headphones. For the first two years of production the leather pilot cap was produced in brown. From 1965, it was changed to dark green.

The helmets are painted with smooth khaki varnish. Together with the helmet wz. 63, masking nets and covers are used.

== Users ==
=== Former ===
- Polish People's Republic: The helmet was standard issue for Polish paratroopers and special forces from 1963 onward.
- Poland: Used after the collapse of communism until 2015 - replaced by HP-03 helmet.
- East Germany: Used by paratroopers and special forces until 1989.
- Iraq: In use by paratroopers and military police during Iran-Iraq War and Gulf War.
