= Wz. 68 Moro =

Polish military camouflage pattern

Wz. 68 moro
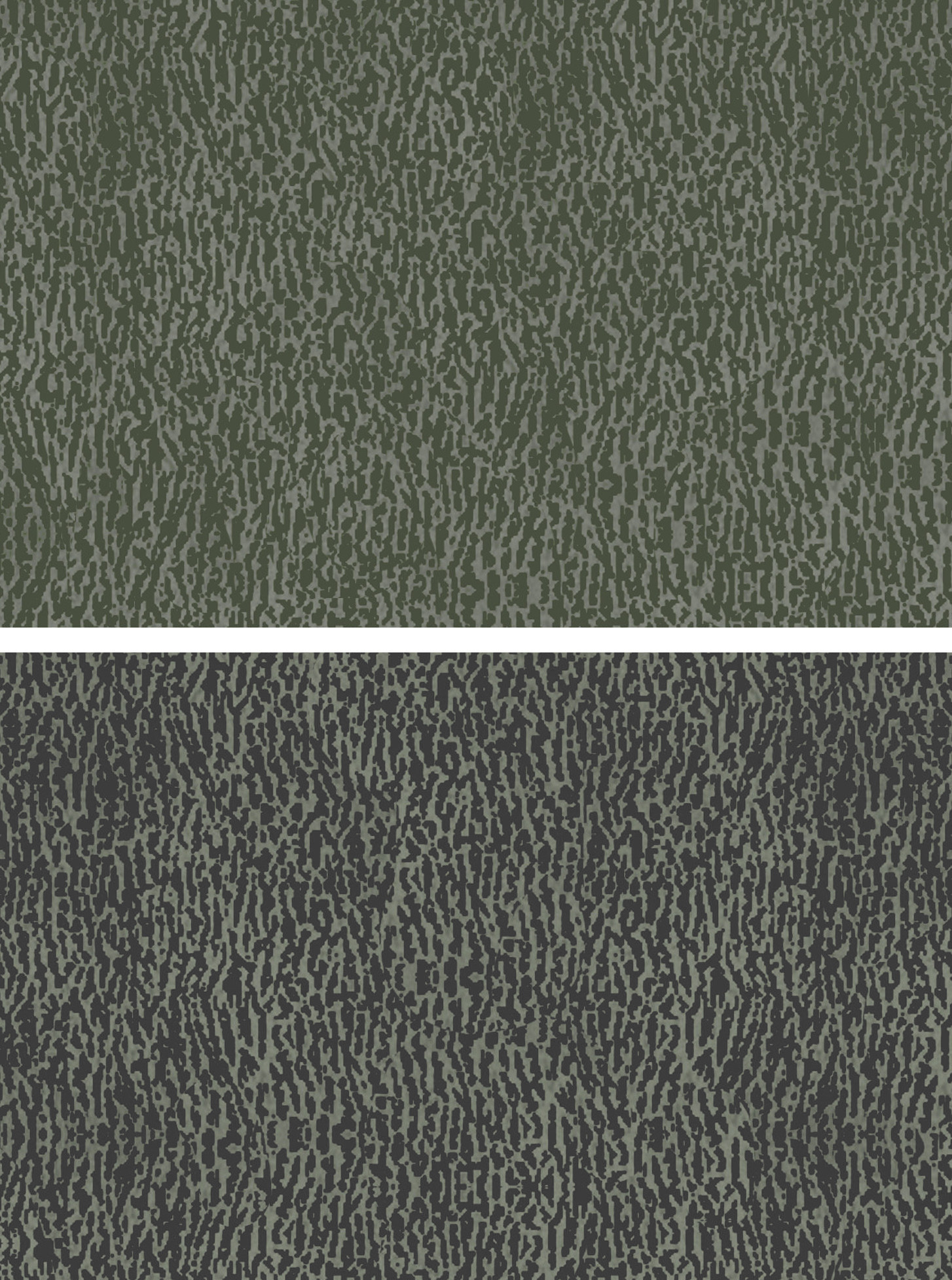
- green and black variant patterns
- Type: Military camouflage patterns
- Place of origin: Polish People's Republic

Service history
- In service: 1969-1989 (Polish People's Army); 1989-2000 (Polish Armed Forces); 1969-1989 (Citizen's Militia)
- Used by: Polish People's Army - Polish Armed Forces; Citizen's Militia; Prison Guards; Polish Fire Department
- Wars: Martial law in Poland

Production history
- Designed: 1968
- Produced: 1968-1989
- Variants: green; black; grey-blue; brown

The Wz. 68 ("moro" or "mora") was an overprint on cotton fabric in protective colors, which are camouflage, used for sewing military uniforms for Polish People's Army, Milicja Obywatelska, Prison Guards, Policja and Polish Fire Department. It was produced in 1969–1989. Moro replaced the older camouflage pattern wz. 58, called "deszczyk" (rain, drizzle). Moro was replaced in 1989 by Wz. 89 Puma.

== History ==
In 1968, a pattern called moro was introduced to the Polish People's Army (often used colloquially to refer to a field uniform, but incorrectly as "camo"). There were several variants of this relatively simple pattern, differing in color. This was an important element from the point of view of identifying individual troops and types of uniformed services. It was more of a visual message, because the camouflage value of this pattern was small, due to the use of a relatively small pattern and low contrast. The wz. 68 camouflage did not deform the soldier's silhouette, creating one color even at a minimal distance.

== Pattern ==
There were six models of the moro overprint, different by colors according to purpose. In version for land forces, color of marks was green. This model was also used by the Interior Ministry of PRL and by the Border Protection Troops. For the Polish Air Force, Anti-Aircraft Forces and the Polish navy, the color of the marks was black.

For Milicja Obywatelska, and also in ZOMO, Prison Guards and Policja - at the beginning was blue, later it was grey-blue. For the Fire Department the color of the marks was dark brown, with bigger speckles, but the first model used in the Fire Department was the same as in the land forces. There was also other pattern than moro for Fire Department.

In the 1990s, another version of the moro camo was used by the Police.

== Gallery of pattern variants ==
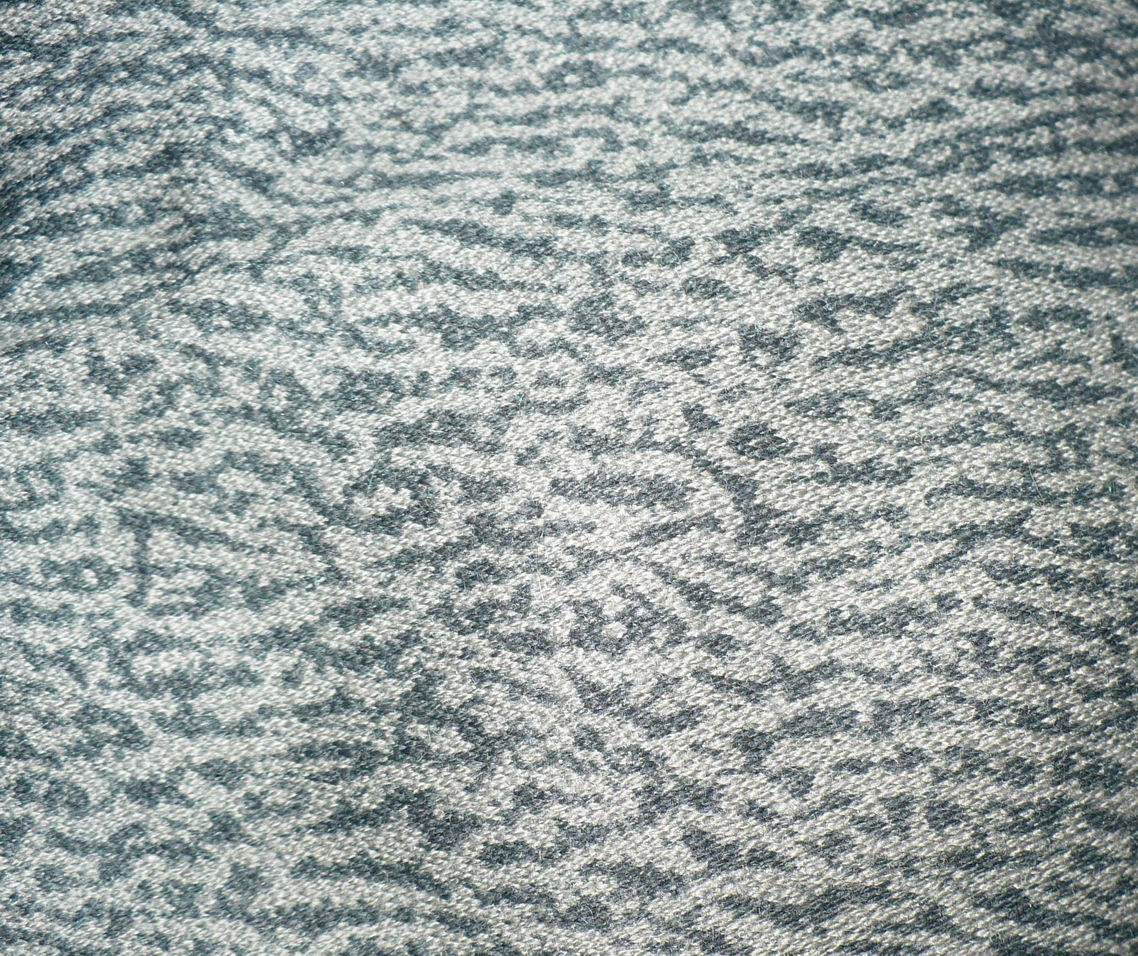
Pattern for Polish Land Forces

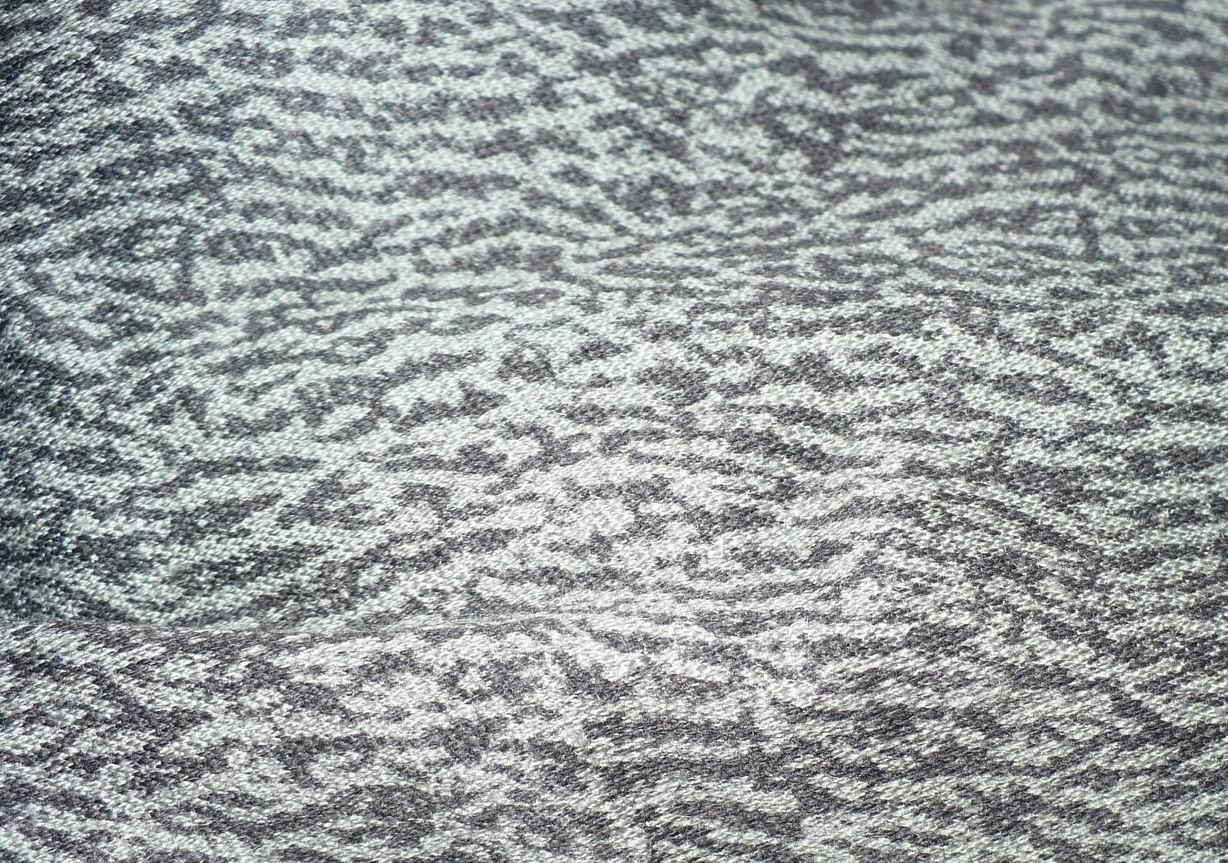
Pattern for Polish Navy and Air Force

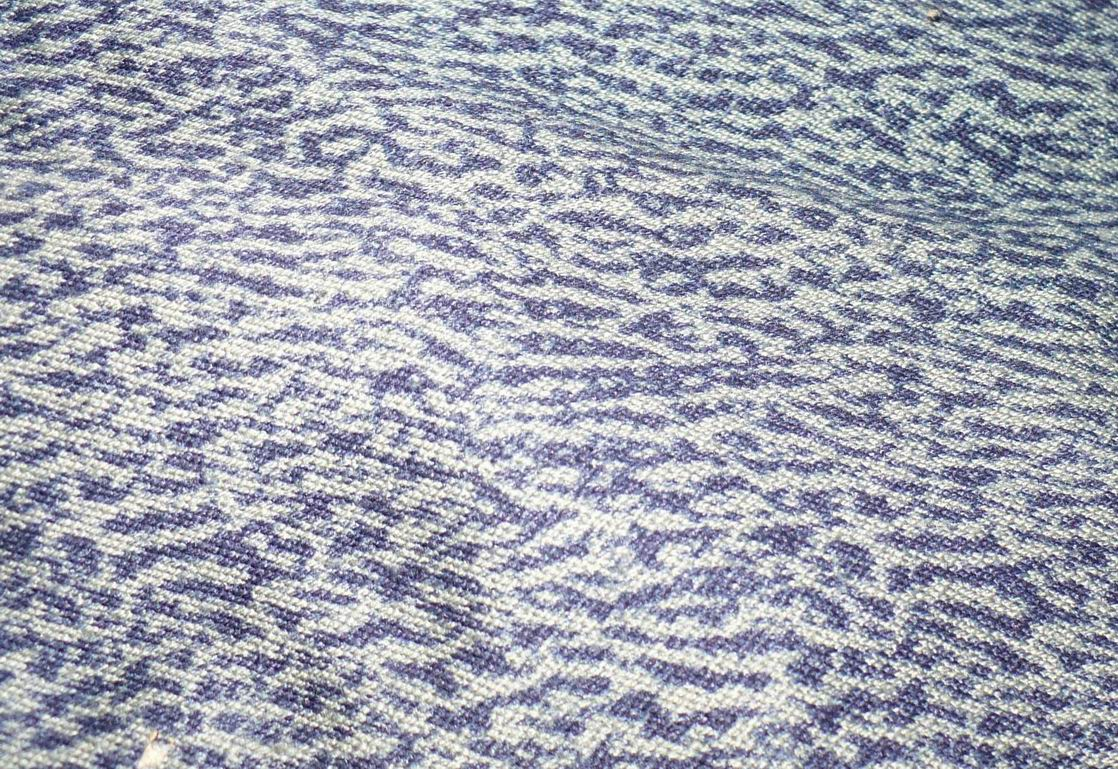
Pattern for Milicja Obywatelska and Policja

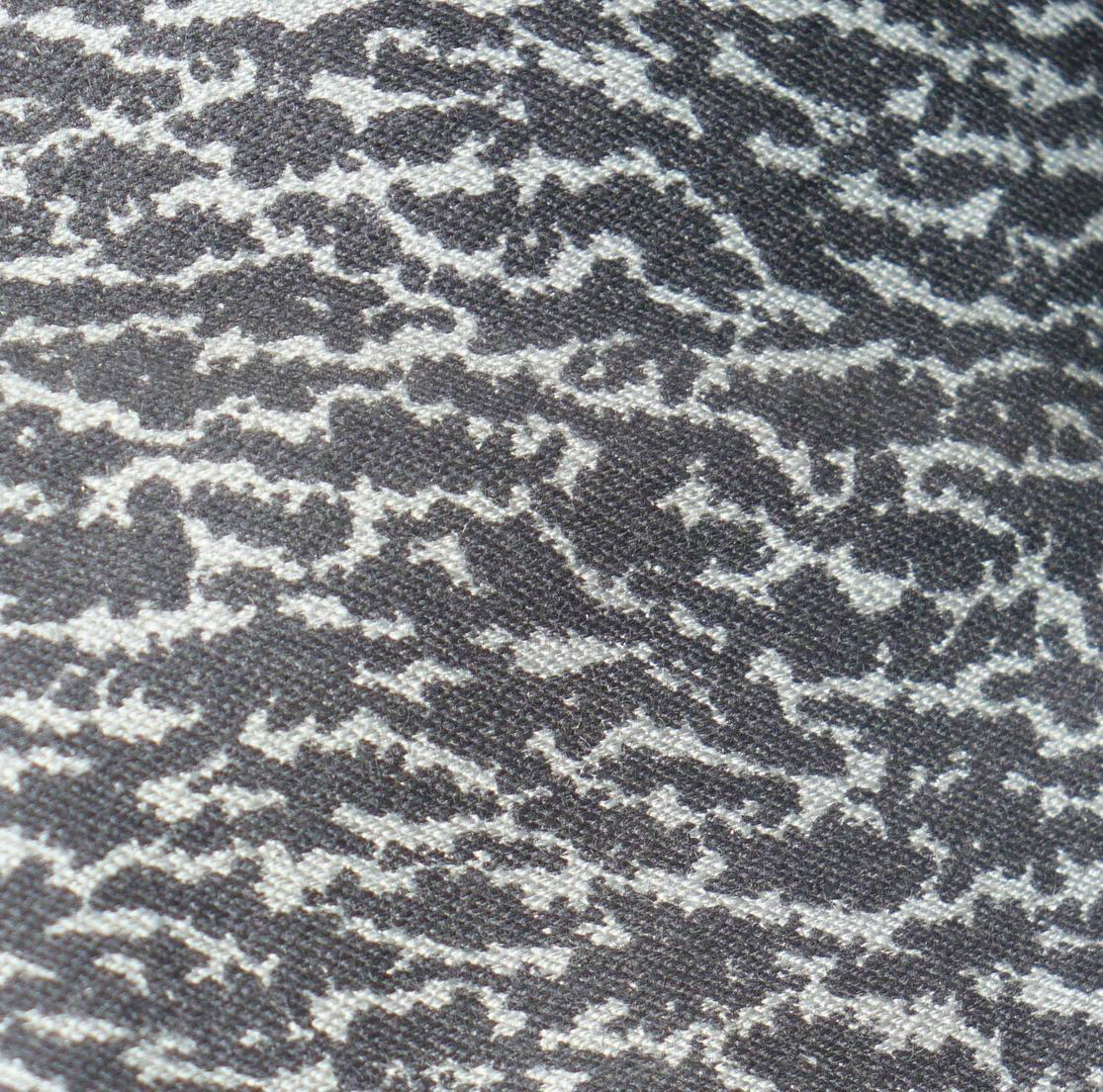
Pattern for the Polish Fire Department

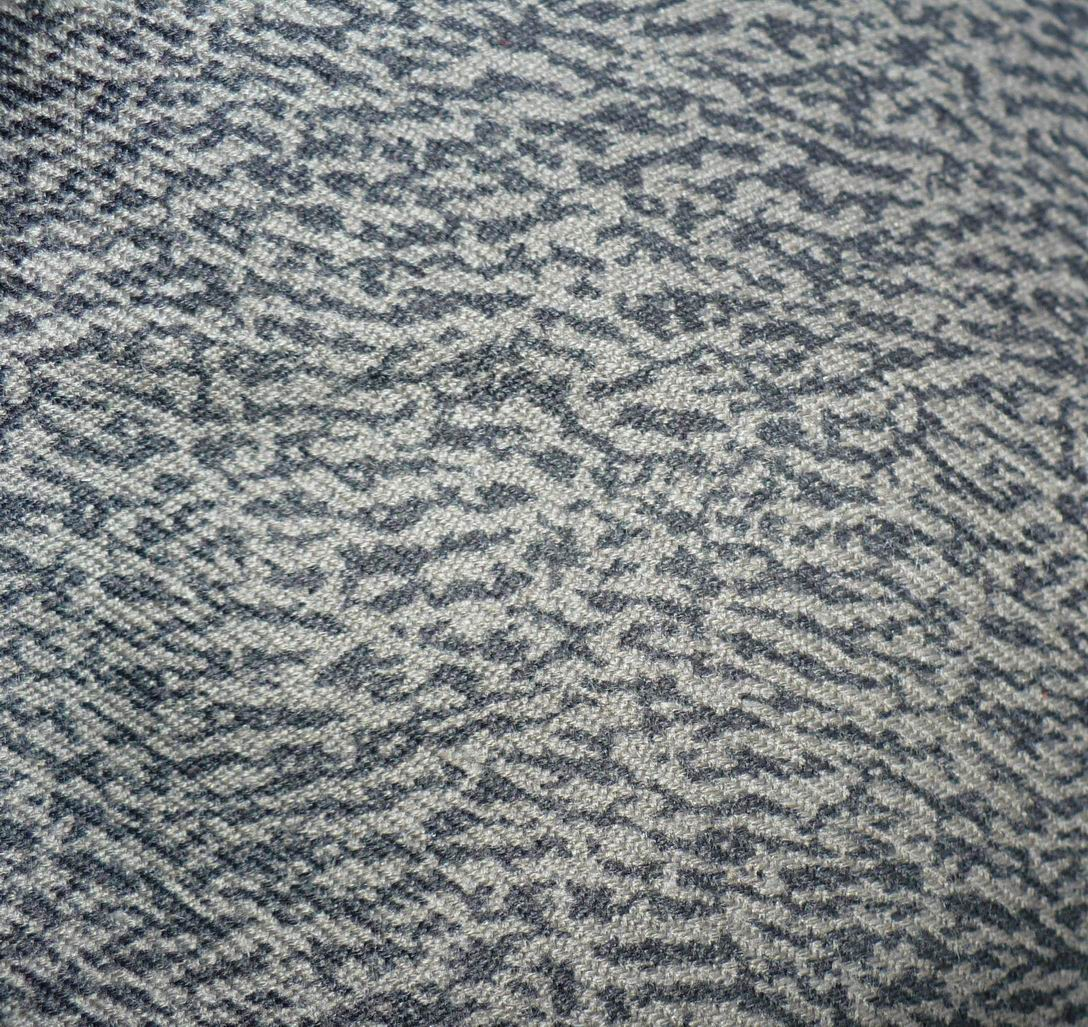
Pattern for the Policja and Prison Guards

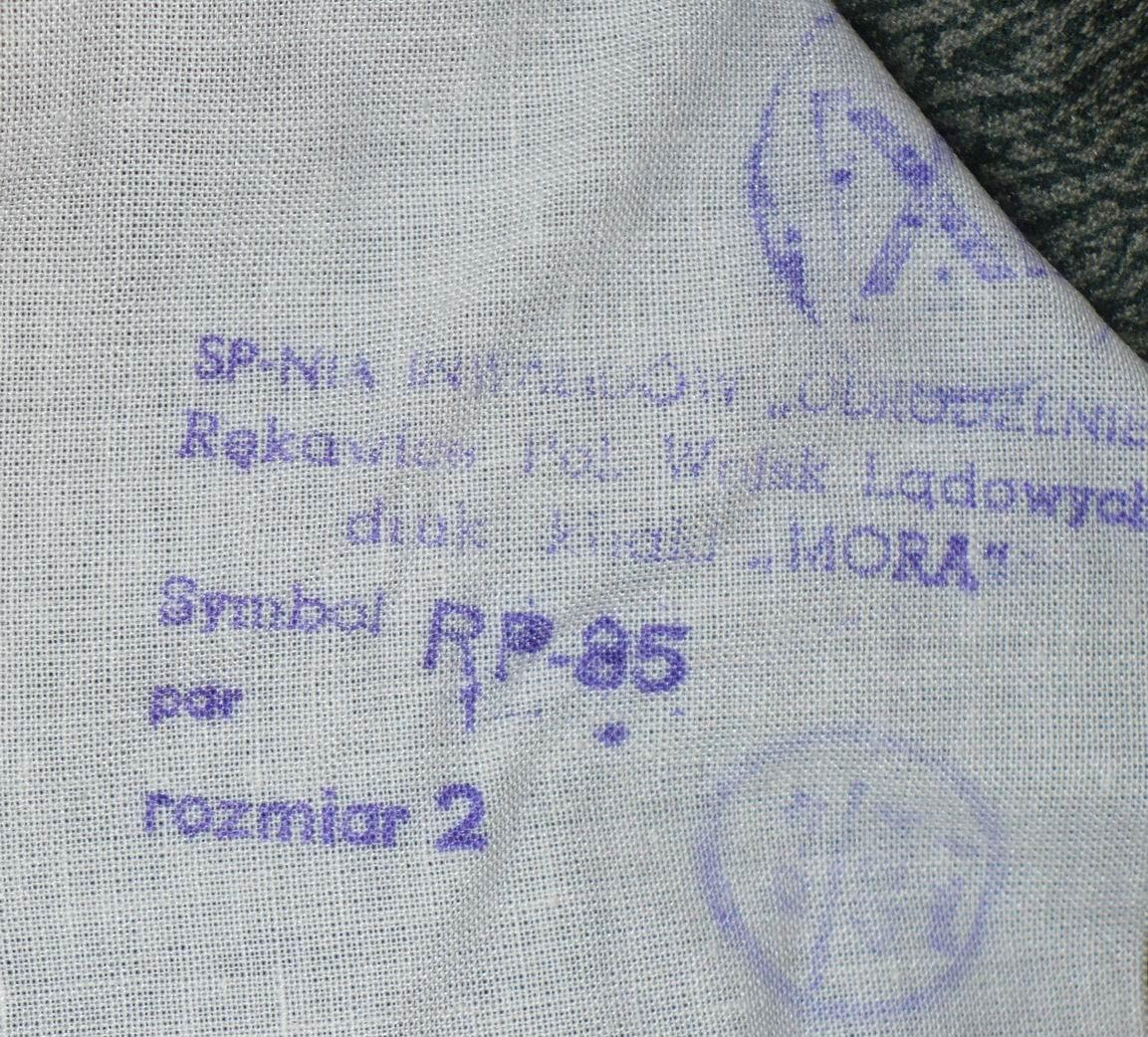
Polish People's Army glove tag
