= Wz. 89 Puma =

Polish military camouflage pattern

wz. 89 Puma
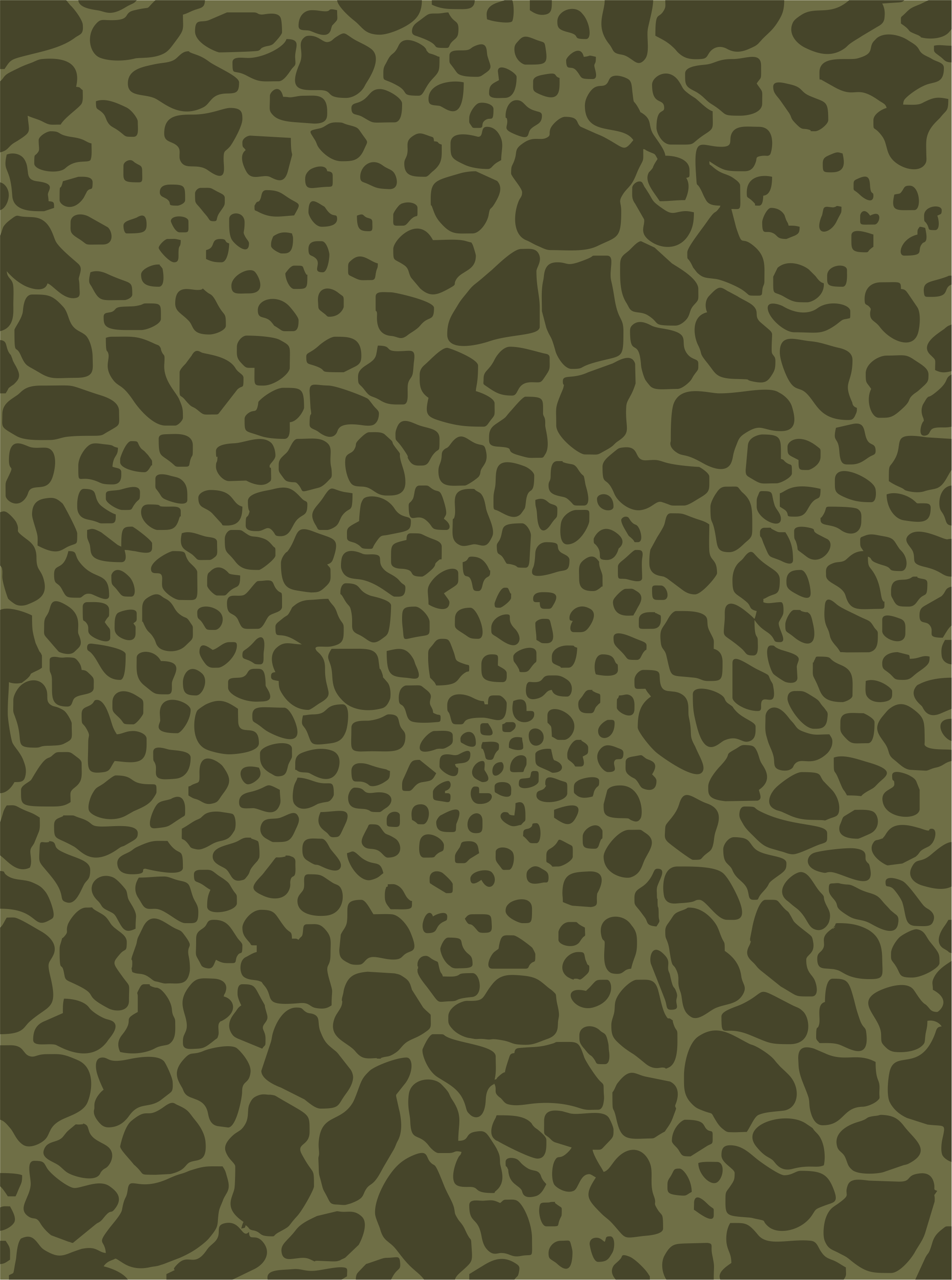
- wz. 89 Puma
- Type: Military camouflage pattern
- Place of origin: Polish People's Republic

Service history
- In service: 1989-2008
- Used by: Polish Armed Forces; Afghan National Army
- Wars: War in Afghanistan

Production history
- Designed: 1987
- Produced: 1989-1993

The Wz. 89 Puma was the successor of the wz. 68 Moro pattern in the Polish Armed Forces. Puma was first produced in 1989, and was replaced in 1993 by wz. 93 Pantera.

== History ==
Camouflage wz. 89 Puma was introduced as the successor of wz. 68 Moro. Unlike its predecessor, Puma was intended to have better camouflage parameters in Polish scenery. It was not very effective, with only two colors; at long range, soldiers wearing Puma stood out against a Polish forest background. Puma was soon replaced, after only 4 years, by the Pantera pattern.

Pursuant to the agreement signed between the Minister of National Defense of the Republic of Poland and the Minister of Defense of the Islamic Republic of Afghanistan on the free transfer of military property, on October 30, 2008, in Ghazni, the National Army of Afghanistan received 3,000 field jackets in camouflage wz. 89 Puma with a lining.

== Pattern ==
The too dark colours used gave poor camouflage properties. The small pattern merges even at short distances. The difference between a single-colour fabric and this pattern is not big. The spots were already larger and more varied than in the previous wz.68 pattern. The paint used to make the print strongly reflected infrared radiation and as a result the uniform was characterised by insufficient values in terms of its detection in night vision.

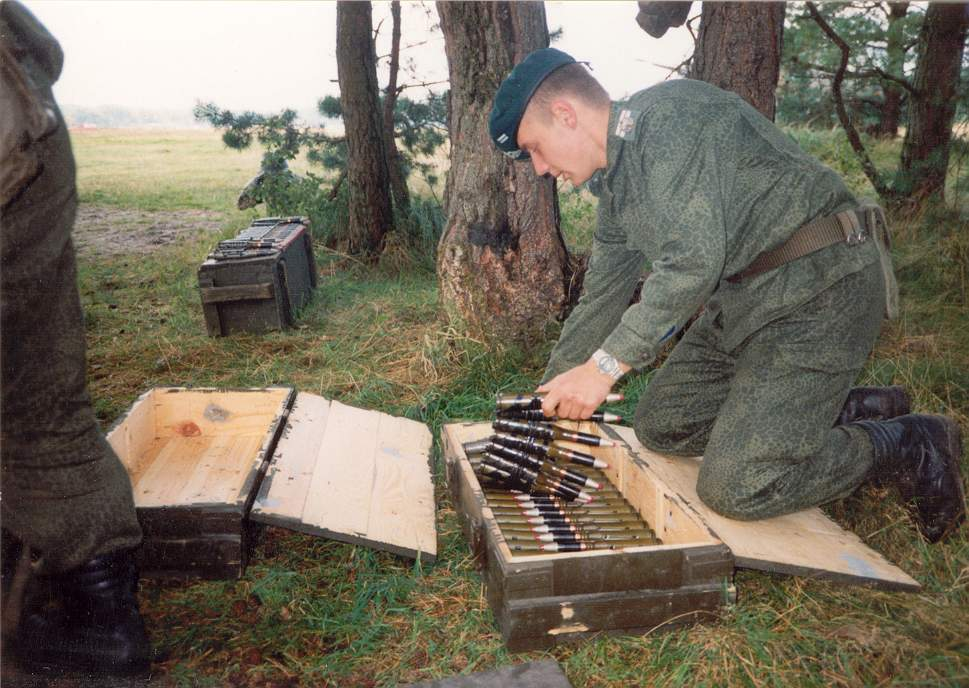
Polish soldier in Puma military uniform loading ammunition to ZU-23-2

== Users ==
- Islamic Republic of Afghanistan: 3000 field jackets in camouflage wz. 89 handed over National Army of Afghanistan in 2008.
- Poland: introduced into service in 1989, withdrawn from 1993, seen in use until the early 2000s.
