= Strichtarn =

East German military camouflage pattern

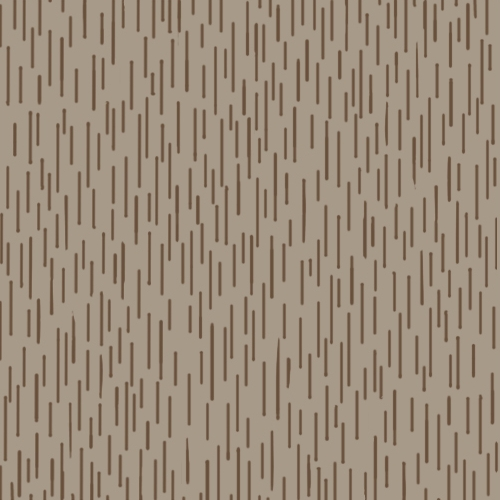
- Fabric sample of Strichtarn
- Type: Military camouflage pattern
- Place of origin: East Germany

Service history
- In service: 1965–1990
- Used by: See Users
- Wars: Rhodesian Bush War; South African Border War Rwandan civil war Angolan Civil War; Yugoslav Wars

Production history
- Produced: 1965–1990

Strichtarn (English: "Line Camouflage") was a military camouflage pattern developed in East Germany and used from 1965 to 1990. The pattern was also used by several other militaries and non-state forces, notably in Africa.

The camo pattern is sometimes known as raindrop pattern.

== History ==
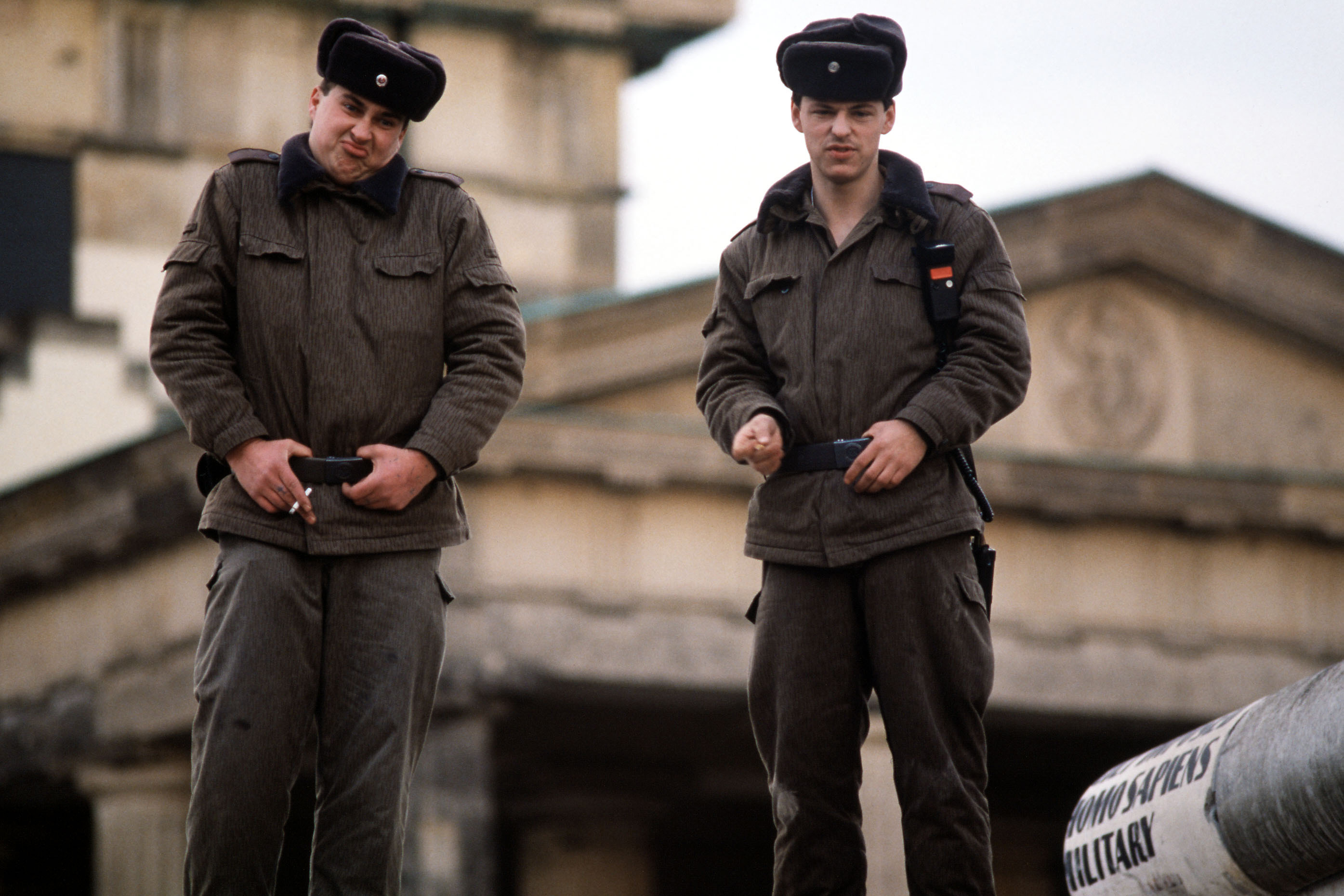
East German Border Guard soldiers at the Berlin Wall in 1989.

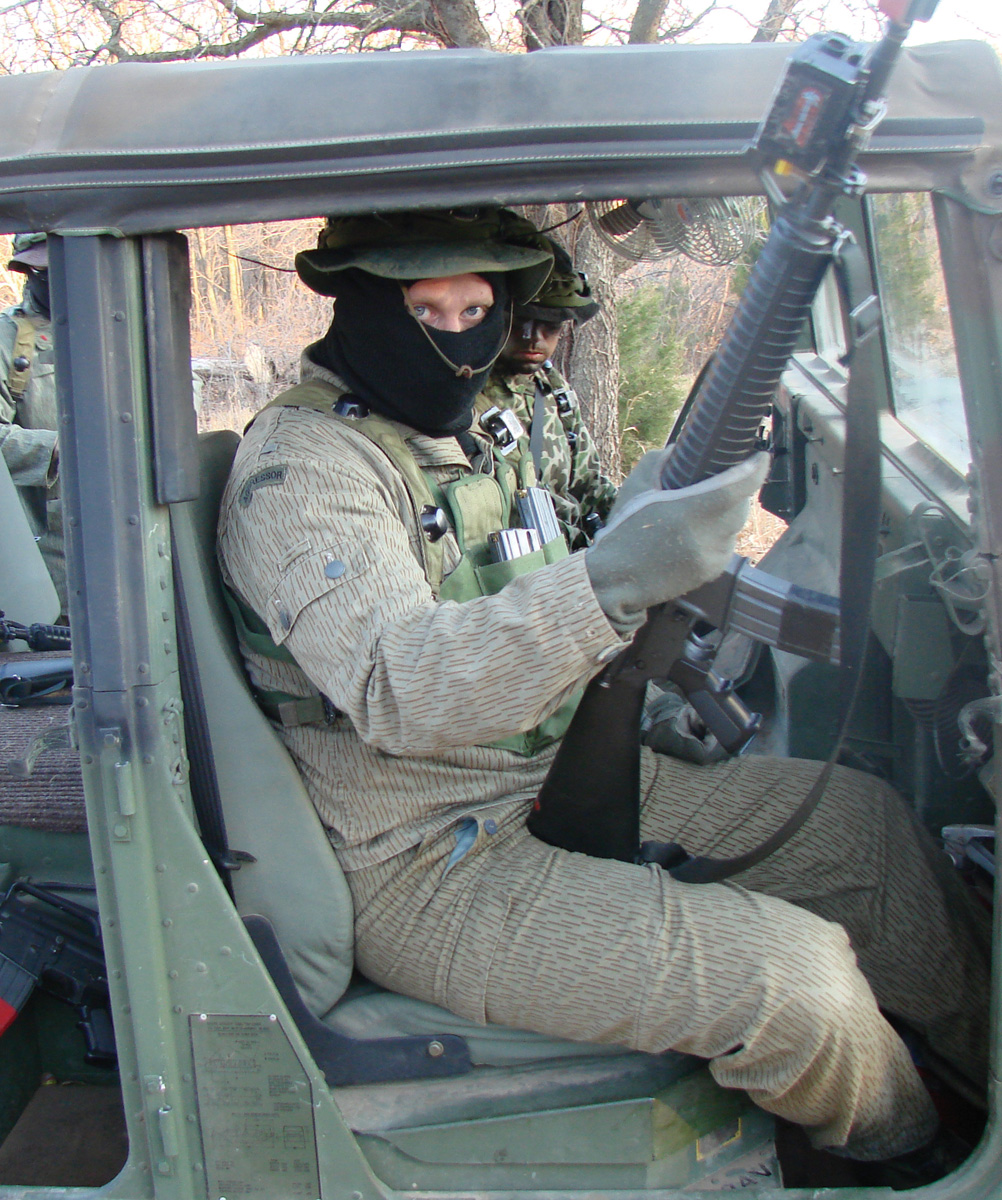
United States Air Force airman prepare to assault Vance Airbase troops in OPFOR scenario.

The Strichtarn was adopted by East Germany in 1965 in service with the National People's Army (NVA) to replace the Flächentarn, also called Blumentarn, which had been adopted in 1958. The NVA decided to adopt a new camouflage pattern in order to address problems with East German forces appearing too similar to those of the Soviet Army. In East German service, the new pattern was known as "Kampfanzug 64". (English: "Combat Suit 64"). The pattern very closely resembles the Czechoslovak Rain Pattern, which itself borrowed from Wehrmacht-era patterns.

The practical effectiveness of Strichtarn is borderline at best, when compared against British Disruptive Pattern Material or US military's M81 BDU in the same environment. The new uniform patterns were issued to the NVA during the late 1960s, and were later supplied in large numbers to communist movements throughout Africa.

East Germany also supplied Strichtarn in large amounts to communist guerrilla movements throughout Africa, where it was known as "rice fleck" camouflage.

== Design ==
Strichtarn was designed with broken vertical red-brown lines on a grey-green field. The patterns made for the Strichtarn consisted of Type 1, which was made from 1965 to 1967, and the Type 2, which was made from 1967 to 1990.

The pattern is also seen as helmet covering for the M56 helmet although not as common as the helmet net with natural camouflage.

== Users ==
=== Developers ===
- Poland: The Polish Army was the first to adopt a Strichtarn-like pattern known as Wz.58 "Deszczyk" (rain) in 1958, first issued to airborne units. The camouflage pattern was then issued to other parts of the armed forces and remained in use into the 1970s before being replaced by Wz. 68 "Moro".
- Czechoslovakia: Strichtarn was adopted as the vz. 60 "Jehličí" (needles) by Czechoslovak forces; the Czechoslovak version differs by having a two-tone background.
- East Germany: East Germany adopted Strichtarn in 1965.

=== Other users ===
- Argentina: In the 1990s the Argentine Army acquired surplus stocks of Strichtarn uniforms, using them as a garrison/fatigue uniforms. It was phased out by the early 2000s.
- Croatia: Numerous Strichtarn variants were used by Croatian forces during the Yugoslav Wars. Most were acquired as surplus gear alongside M56/76 helmets and used until 1992, when Strichtarn-based clothing supplies ran out.
- Estonia: Used by the Estonian Defence League in the 1990s after the Cold War.
- Kazakhstan
- Kyrgyzstan: Acquired surplus Strichtarn for the Kyrgyz military during the 1990s.
- People's Republic of Mozambique - Strichtarn uniforms were in use during the Rhodesian Bush War
- Rhodesia: ZANU and ZAPU wore locally made Strichtarn uniforms produced from East German supplied fabric. It was known locally as "Rice fleck".
- Rwanda
- South Africa: The South African Defence Force used the pattern. Clones were made for South African Special Forces operators during the South African Border War.
- Uzbekistan: Strichtarn camouflage uniforms and fabric were used by Airborne and Special Task Force personnel from approximately 2002–2006.

=== Non-state actors ===
- FAPLA
- FRELIMO
- Rwandan Patriotic Front
- SWAPO
- UNITA

== Bibliography ==
- Krauß, Michael (2016). Die getarnte Sommerfelddienstbekleidung der DDR 1956 bis 1990: Band 2. Norderstedt: Books on Demand. ISBN 978-3741289668.
- Larson, Eric H. (2021). Camouflage: Modern International Military Patterns. Barnsley: Pen & Sword. ISBN 9781526739537.
- Mikulan, Krunoslav; Thomas, Nigel (2006). The Yugoslav Wars (1): Slovenia & Croatia 1991–95. Oxford: Osprey. ISBN 978-0850457308.
- Pitta, Robert (27 May 1993). South African Special Forces. Osprey Publishing. ISBN 978-1-85532-295-0.
- Rottman, Gordon L. (1987). Warsaw Pact Ground Forces. Oxford: Osprey. ISBN 978-0850457308.
- Zaloga, Steven (1985). Soviet Bloc Elite Forces. Osprey Publishing. ISBN 978-0850456318.
