= Brodie helmet =

Metal combat helmet

Brodie Helmet
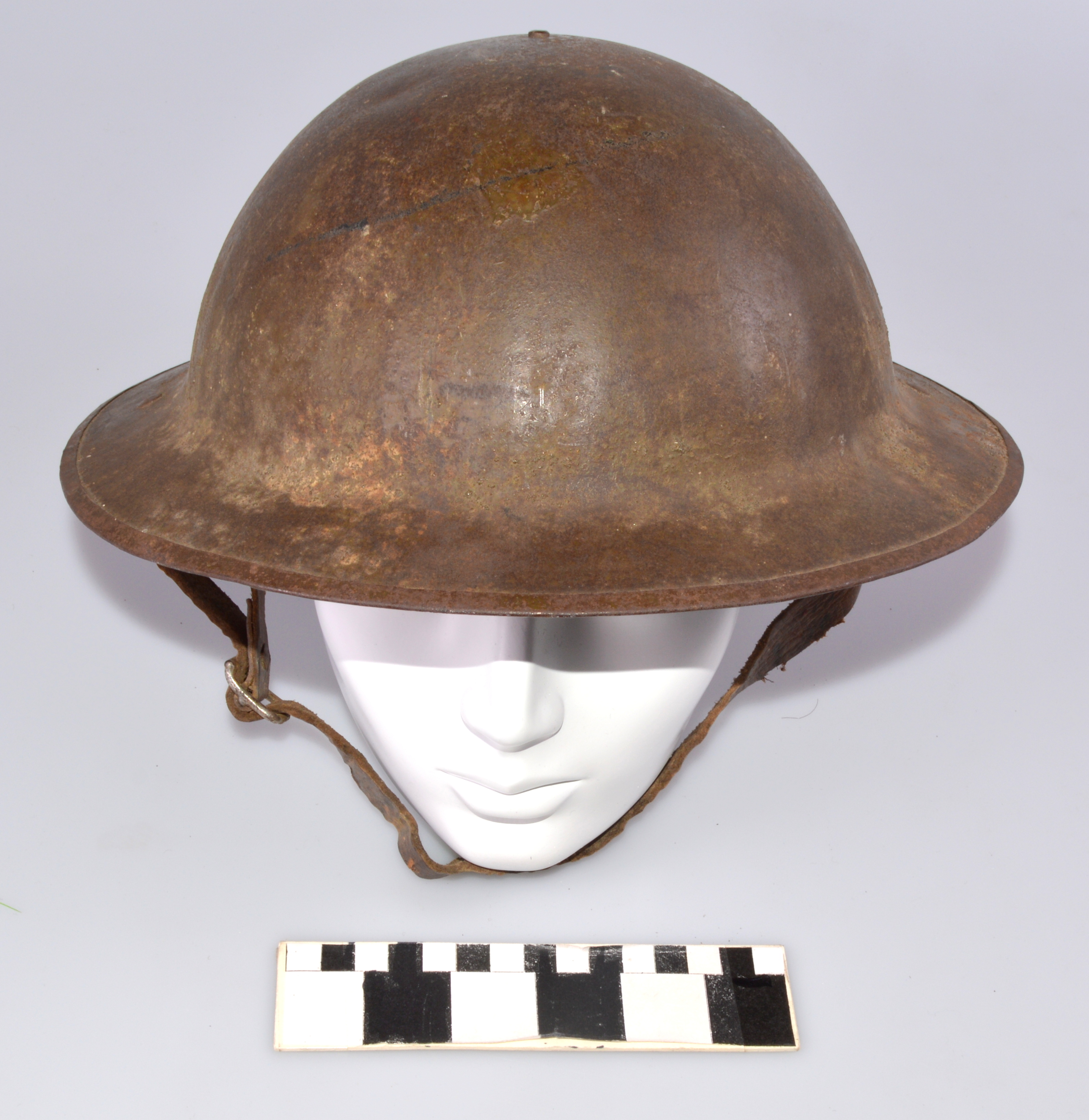
- A British Mark I helmet dating from 1917. This was a developed version of the original Brodie helmet and was worn by British Empire and US troops.
- Place of origin: United Kingdom

Service history
- Used by: See Users
- Wars: First World War; Russian Civil War; Second Sino-Japanese War; Second World War; Indonesian National Revolution; 1948 Arab–Israeli War; Korean War; Indo-Pakistan Wars; Six-Day War; War of Attrition; Turkish invasion of Cyprus; Falklands War; Operation Bluestar

Production history
- Designer: John Leopold Brodie
- Designed: 1915
- No. produced: Millions
- Variants: See Variants

The Brodie helmet is a steel combat helmet designed and patented in London in 1915 by Latvian inventor John Leopold Brodie (Leopolds Janno Braude). A modified form of it became the Helmet, Steel, Mark I in Britain and the M1917 Helmet in the US. Colloquially, it was called the shrapnel helmet, battle bowler, Tommy helmet, tin hat, and in the United States the doughboy helmet. It was also known as the dishpan hat, tin pan hat, pie plate, washbasin, and Kelly helmet. The Imperial German Army soldiers called it the Salatschüssel (salad bowl).

== Background ==
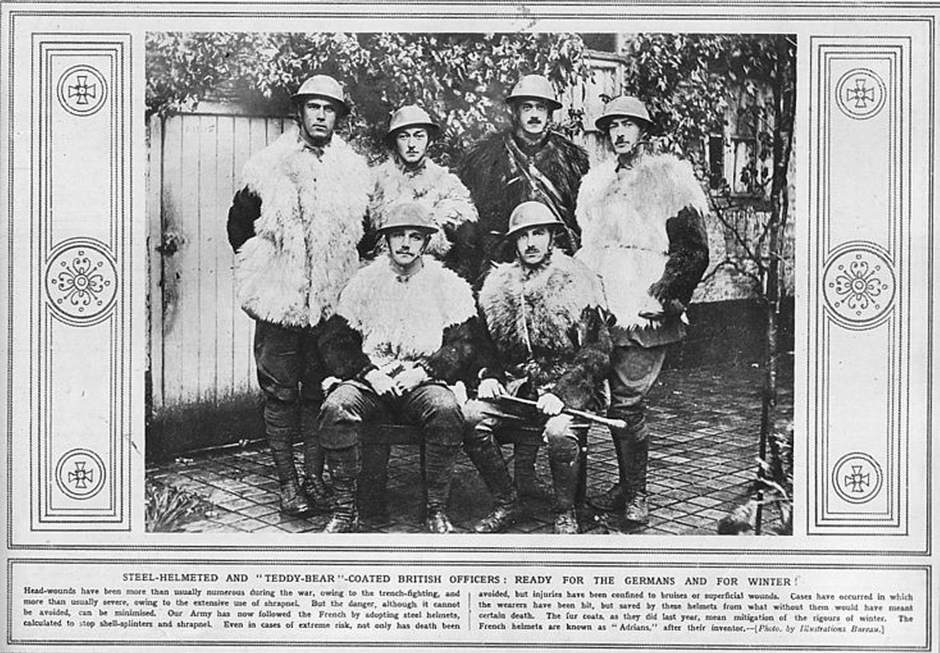
The Illustrated War News—17 November 1915 The caption reads: "Head-wounds have been more than usually numerous during the war, owing to the trench-fighting, and more than usually severe, owing to the extensive use of shrapnel. But the danger, although it cannot be avoided, can be minimised. Our Army has now followed the French by adopting steel helmets, calculated to stop shell-splinters and shrapnel. Even in cases of extreme risk, not only has death been avoided, but injuries have been confined to bruises or superficial wounds. Cases have occurred in which the wearers have been hit, but saved by these helmets from what without them would have meant certain death. The fur coats, as they did last year, mean mitigation of the rigours of winter. The French helmets are known as "Adrians," after their inventor. (Photo by Illustrations Harrow)."

At the outbreak of World War I, none of the combatants provided their troops with steel helmets. Soldiers of most nations went into battle wearing cloth, felt or leather headgear that offered no protection from modern weapons.

A significant partial exception to this lack was the German Pickelhaube. Like other army helmets of 1914, it was made out of leather; but it also had a significant number of steel inserts, which offered some head protection. This included the top spike, originally used to stop strikes from an enemy hand-held sabre.

The huge number of lethal head wounds that modern artillery weapons inflicted upon the French Army led them to introduce the first modern steel helmets in the summer of 1915. The first French helmets were bowl-shaped steel skullcaps worn under the cloth caps. These rudimentary helmets were soon replaced by the Model 1915 Adrian helmet, designed by August-Louis Adrian. The idea was later adopted by most other combatant nations.

== Origins ==
At about the same time, the British War Office had seen a similar need for steel helmets. The War Office Invention Department was ordered to evaluate the French design. They decided that it was not strong enough and too complex to be swiftly manufactured. British industry was not geared up for an all-out effort of war production in the early days of World War I, which also led to the shell shortage of 1915.

John Leopold Brodie (1873–1945), born Leopold Janno Braude in Riga, was an entrepreneur and inventor who had made a fortune in the gold and diamond mines of South Africa but was working in London at that time. A design patented by him in August 1915 offered advantages over the French helmet. It was constructed in one piece that could be pressed from a single thick sheet of steel, giving it added strength and making it simple to manufacture. Brodie's patent deals mainly with the innovative lining arrangements; an engineer called Alfred Bates of the firm of Willis & Bates of Halifax, Yorkshire, manufacturer of Vapalux paraffin pressure lamps, claimed that he was asked by the War Office to find a method of manufacturing an anti-shrapnel helmet and that it was he who had devised the basic shape of the steel shell; some newspaper articles are the only evidence for this claim.

Brodie's helmet resembled designs from past eras, in particular the medieval infantry kettle hat or chapel-de-fer and the samurai/ashigaru jingasa helmet, unlike the German Stahlhelm, which resembled the medieval sallet. The Brodie had a shallow circular crown with a wide brim around the edge, a leather liner and a leather chinstrap. The helmet's soup-bowl shape was designed to protect the wearer's head and shoulders from shrapnel shell projectiles bursting from above the trenches. The design allowed the use of relatively thick steel that could be formed in a single pressing while maintaining the helmet's thickness. This made it more resistant to projectiles but it offered less protection to the lower head and neck than other helmets.

The original design (Type A) was made of mild steel with a brim 1.5–2 inches (38–51 mm) wide. The Type A was in production for just a few weeks before the specification was changed and the Type B was introduced in October 1915. The specification was altered at the suggestion of Sir Robert Hadfield to a harder steel with 12% manganese content, which became known as Hadfield steel and was virtually impervious to shrapnel hitting from above. Ballistically, this updated specification increased protection for the wearer by 10%. It also had a narrower brim and a more domed crown.

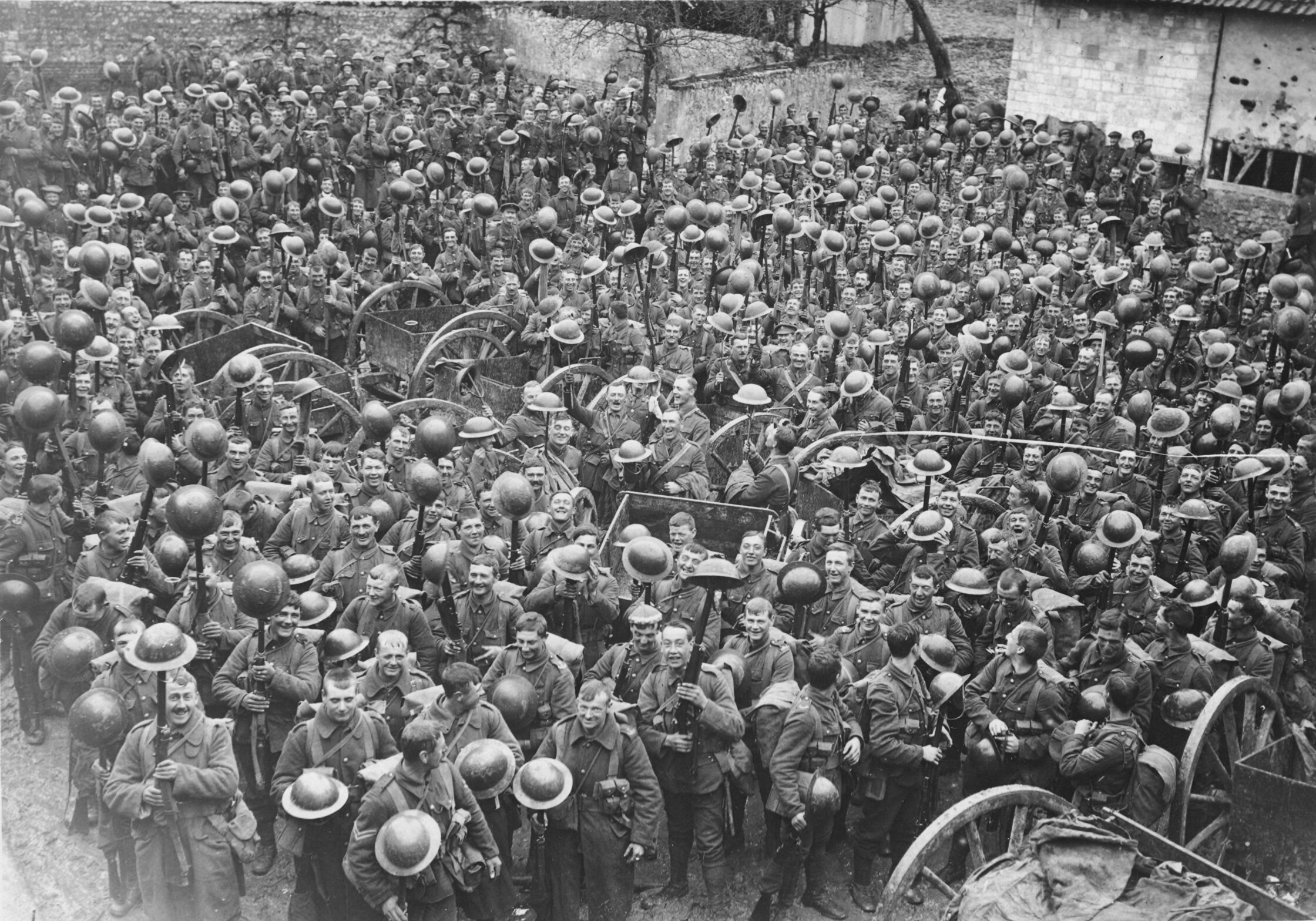
The Loyal North Lancashire Regiment showing off their new Brodie helmets (1916).

The original paint scheme, suggested by Brodie, was a mottled light green, blue and orange camouflage but they were also painted in green or blue-grey.

The weight of a lined Mark I helmet was approximately 2.4 pounds (1.1 kg).

== Service ==
The first delivery of the Brodie to British Army troops took place in September 1915, at the rate of 50 per battalion. Initially, there were far from enough helmets to equip every man, so they were designated as trench stores, to be kept in the front line and used by each unit that occupied the sector. By early 1916, about a quarter of a million had been made, and the first action in which the Brodie was worn by all ranks was the Battle of St Eloi, in April.

Although the helmet's benefits were recognised, there was criticism from several quarters, including General Herbert Plumer, who said that the helmet was too shallow and too light-reflective, its rim was too sharp, and its lining was too slippery. It was decided to introduce a number of improvements, and from May supplies of the modified helmet, designated the Mark I, began to arrive. It had a separate folded rim, a two-part liner, and matte khaki paint finished with sand, sawdust, or crushed cork to give a dull, non-reflective appearance.

By the summer of 1916 the first million helmets had been produced, and they were issued to all troops.

Troops from other countries also used the Brodie helmet, including the United States Armed Forces, when they began to deploy in France late in 1917. The United States government initially purchased some 400,000 helmets from Britain. From January 1918 the U.S. Army began to use helmets manufactured in the US and these helmets were designated M1917. The steel helmet was known to the troops as a tin hat, or, for the officers, a battle bowler (from bowler hat). British soldiers soon identified with their helmets, much as French and German soldiers.

By the end of the war some 7.5 million Brodie helmets had been produced, including 1.5 million M1917 helmets for use by American forces.

=== Interwar and World War II ===
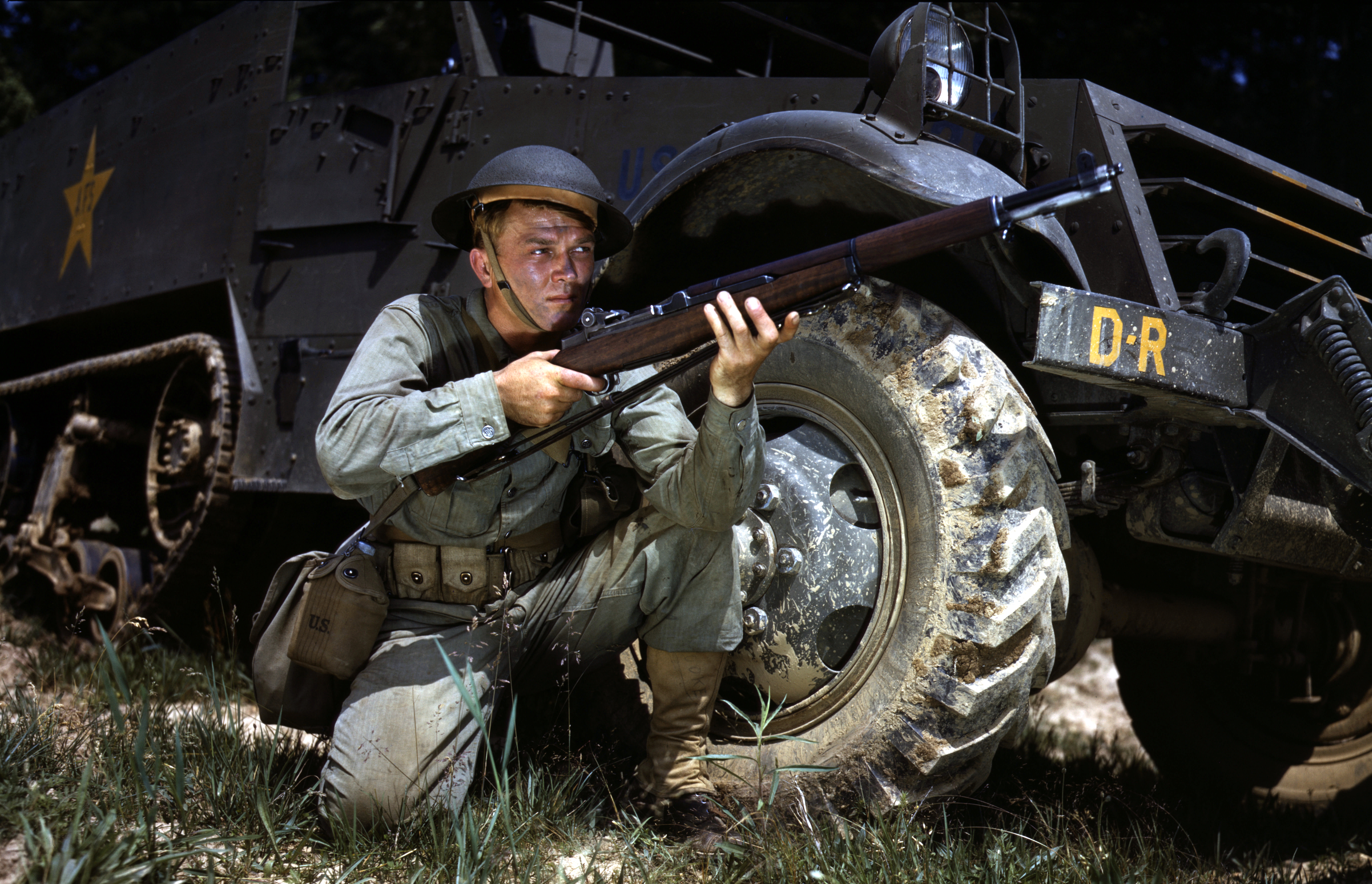
U.S. Army Infantryman in 1942 wearing an M1917A1 helmet

From 1936, the Mark I helmet was fitted with an improved liner and an elasticated, sprung webbing chin strap. This final variant served until late 1940, when it was superseded by the slightly modified Mk II, which served the British and Commonwealth forces throughout World War II. British paratroopers and airborne forces used the Helmet Steel Airborne Troop.

Several Commonwealth nations, such as Australia, New Zealand, Canada and South Africa, produced local versions of the Mk II, which can be distinguished from those made in Britain.

During this period, the helmet was also used by the police, the fire brigade and ARP wardens in Britain. The helmets for the ARP wardens came in two principal variants, black with a white "W" for wardens and white with a black "W" for senior ranks (additional black stripes denoted seniority within the warden service); however numerous different patterns were used. A civilian pattern was also available for private purchase, known as the Zuckerman helmet, which was a little deeper but made from ordinary mild steel.

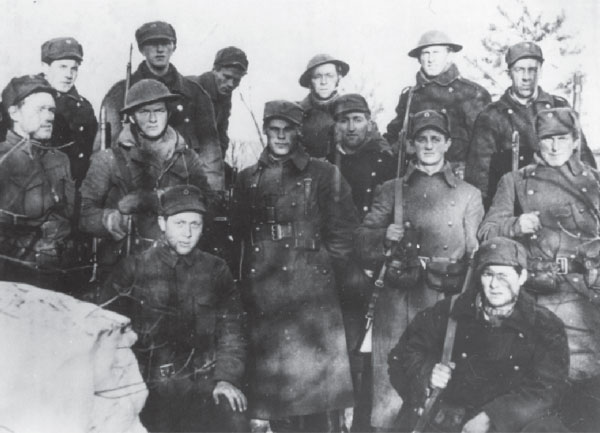
Norwegian soldiers at the Battle of Hegra Fortress in 1940, a few wearing Mark I helmets

The Norwegian Army adopted the Mark I helmet in 1915, eventually importing a total of 10,000 examples. Some of the imported helmets had a helmet plate with the Norwegian coat of arms affixed to the front. The Mark I remained in Norwegian service throughout the interwar period, alongside Swedish helmets acquired in the 1930s. The helmets were among the equipment issued to Norwegian forces in World War II, seeing service in the 1940 Norwegian Campaign against invading German forces. In the first post-war years, the Mark I helmet remained in service with the Norwegian Army, alongside the American M1 helmet, Swedish helmets, and Stahlhelms left behind by the capitulated German occupation forces.

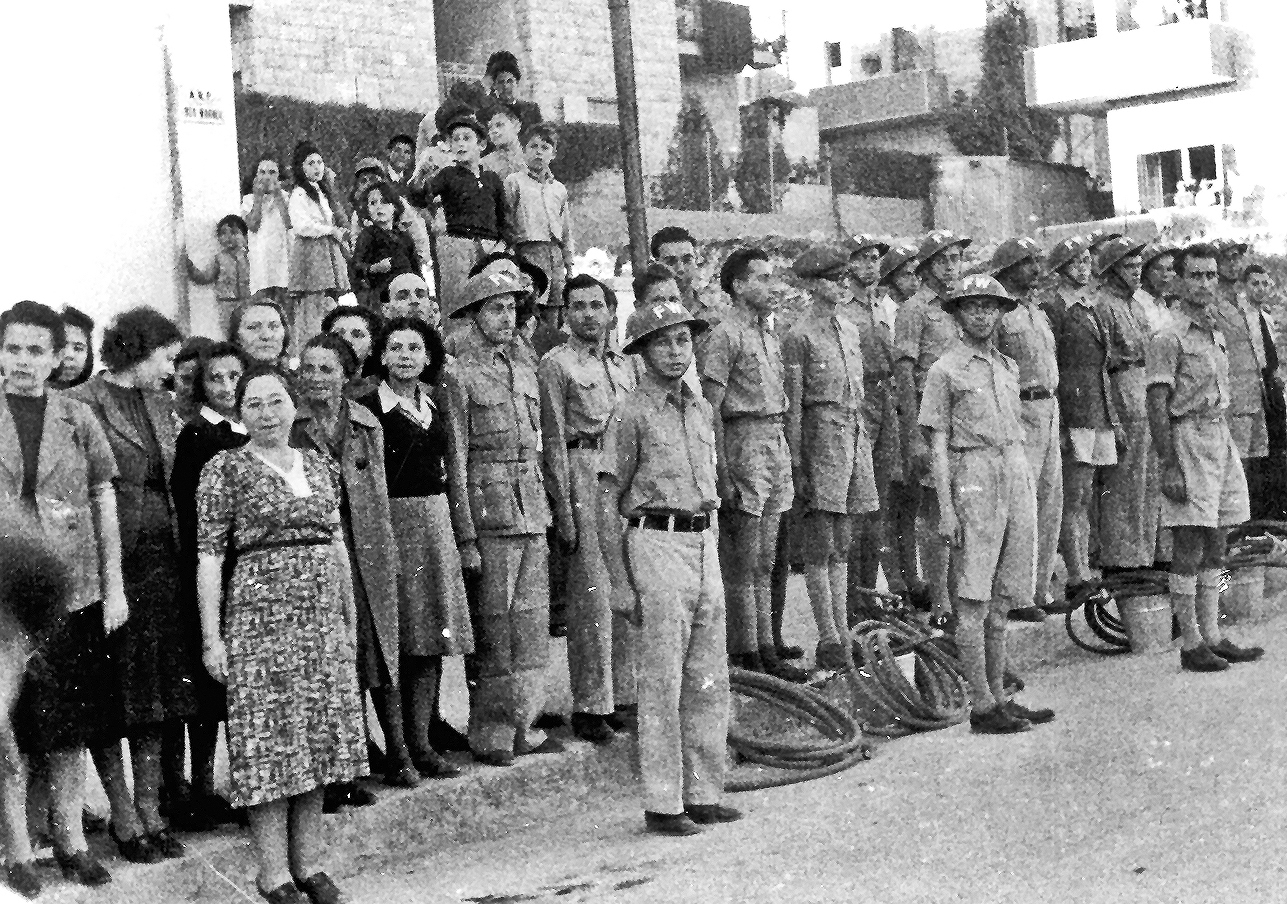
Jewish Civil Defense group in Jerusalem in 1942. The group served as ARP Fire Wardens, equipped with water hoses and buckets, some wearing FW (Fire Watcher) Brodie helmets. Men are in uniform while women wear plain clothes. Composer Josef Tal stands next to the woman with a black sweater.

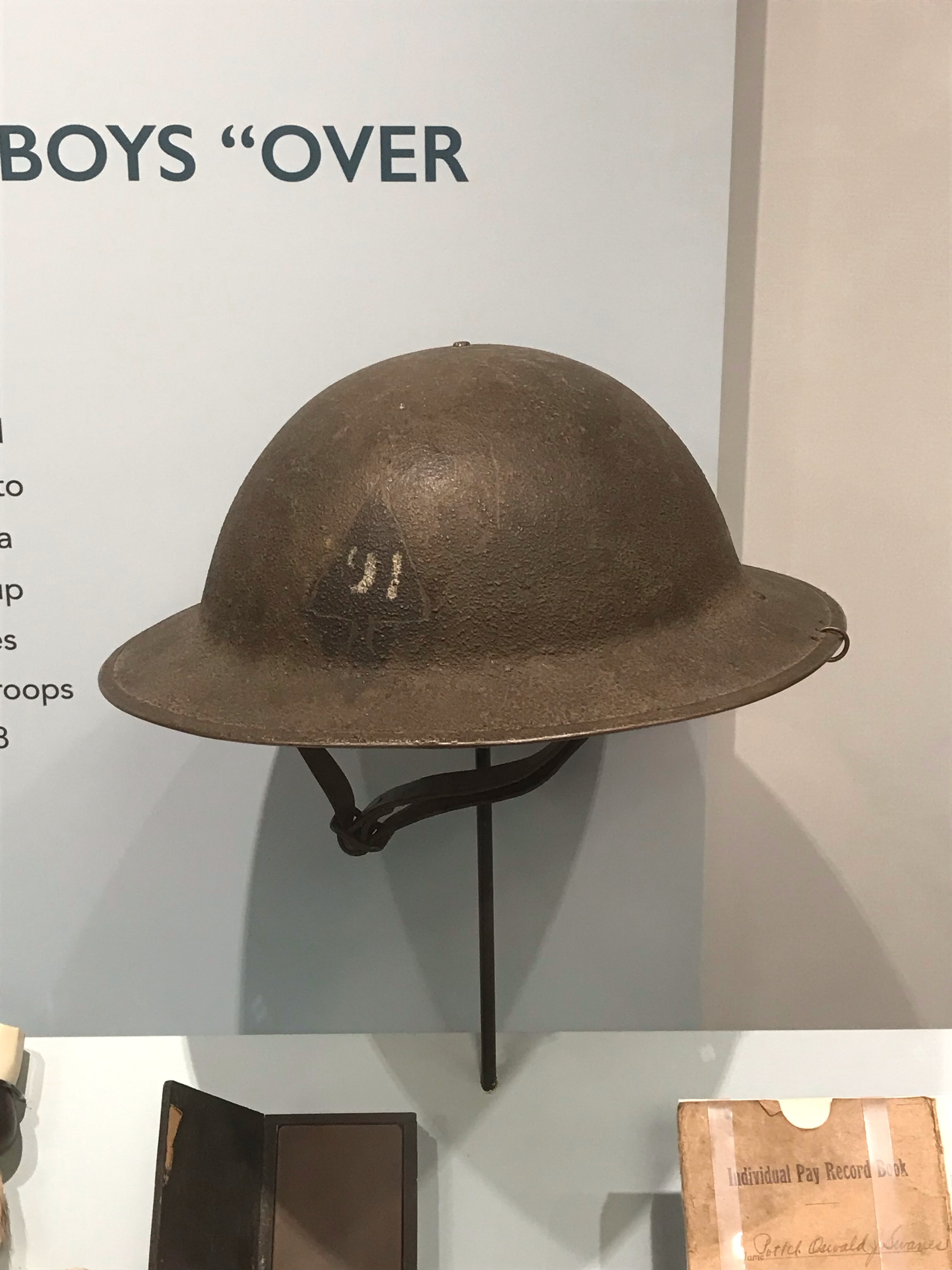
M1917 helmet worn by a Doughboy of the 91st Division in France in 1918

In 1944, the British supplemented it with a significantly modified design, known as the Mk III "Turtle" helmet.

The U.S. Army used the basic Brodie-patterned M1917 helmet until 1942 with some modifications, which included a totally new liner and canvas chin strap. It was finally superseded by the M1 helmet in 1942 and passed down to civil defence.

The helmet was the inspiration for the name of the Memorable Order of Tin Hats (or the MOTH), a brotherhood of ex-front-line soldiers founded in 1927 by Charles Evenden.

== Variants ==
=== United Kingdom ===
- Brodie's Steel Helmet, War Office Pattern, Type A: the original 1915 helmet with the shell made from magnetic mild steel.
- Brodie's Steel Helmet, Type B: with the shell made from Hadfield (manganese) steel.
- Helmet, Steel, Mark I: introduced in Spring, 1916, a modified version of the Brodie helmet with a wholly redesigned liner and a mild steel rim to the shell. In 1917, a rubber ring or "doughnut" was added between the liner and the top of the shell, and in 1935, the liner and chinstrap were modified to make them removable.
- Helmet, Steel, Mark I*: introduced in 1938 and made up from old Mark I shells, but fitted with an all new liner and chinstrap. This was the standard British Army helmet at the start of the Second World War.

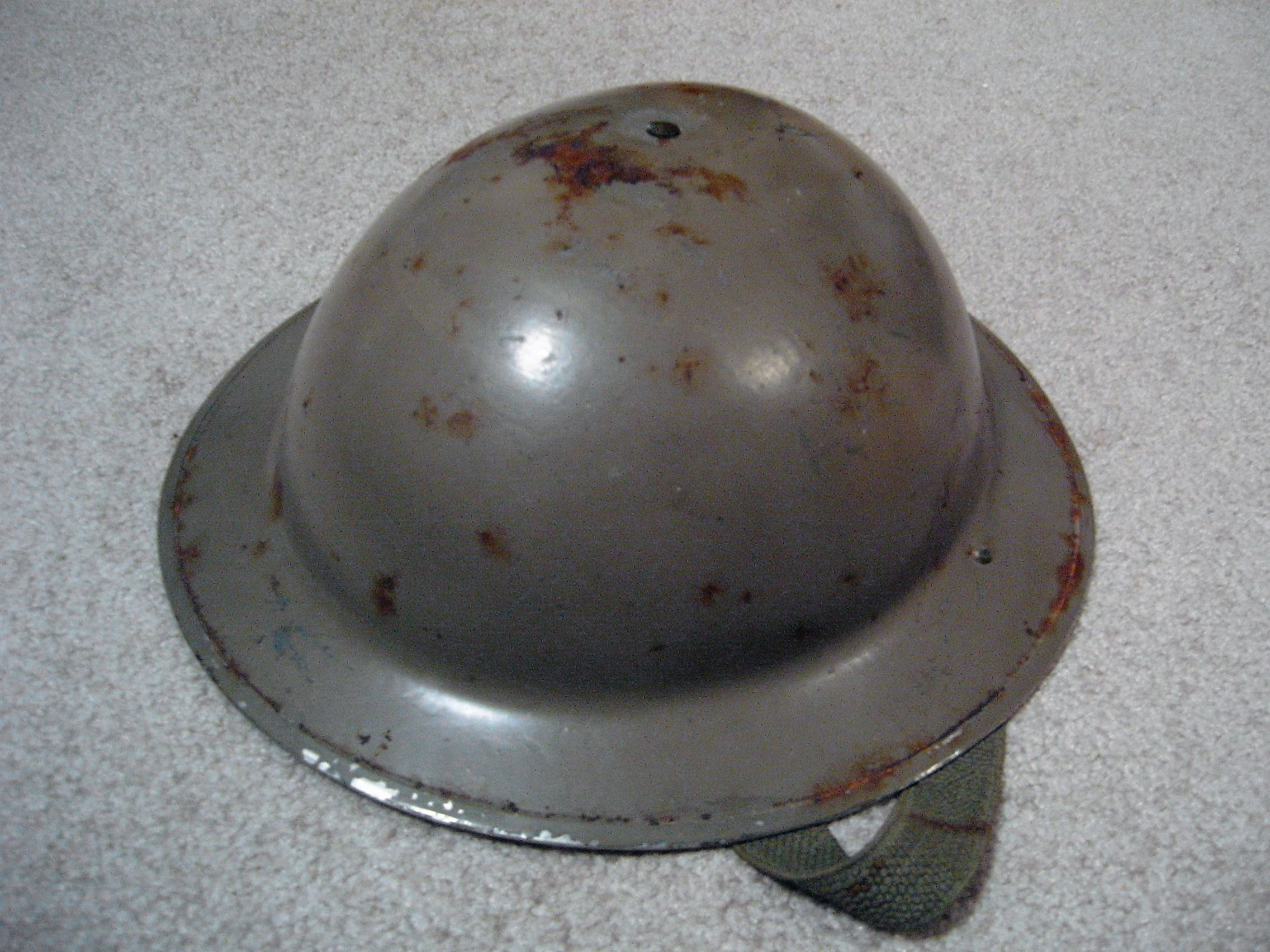
A British helmet dating from the Second World War, probably a Mark II. The grey finish suggests that it was issued to one of the civil defence services.

- Helmet, Steel, Mark II: also introduced in 1938, the Mark II featured a new shell with a non-magnetic rim (so that the wearer could use a magnetic compass) and the new liner and chinstrap used in the Mark I*. Early production went to the ARP services, the fire brigade and the police. It was re-designated in July 1940 as the Helmet, Steel, Mark II, No 1 and in the following year, as the Helmet, Steel, No 1, Mark 1.
- Helmet, Steel, Mark II, No 2: by July 1940, it had been realised that demand for the Mark II helmet could not be met, and so helmets which had either been rejected as substandard, or had been newly manufactured from cheaper mild steel, began to be issued under the designation "Mark II, No 2" to the Home Guard and civilian services. These helmets were marked with between one and four small holes drilled into the rim, showing the level of protection that they would provide. This type of helmet was re-designated in 1941 as the Helmet, Steel, No 2, Mark 1.

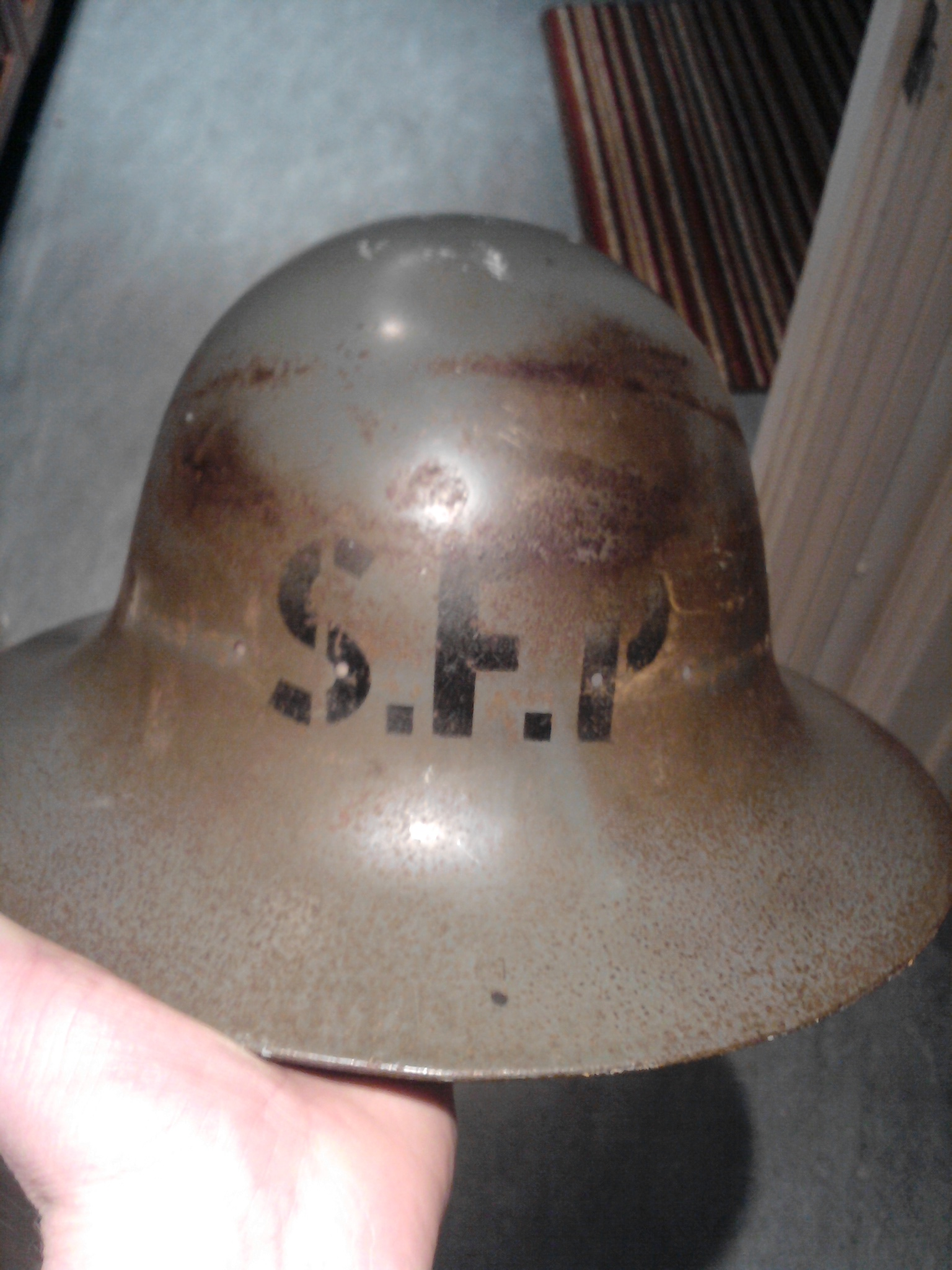
A 1941-dated Zuckerman helmet marked "SFP" for "Street Fire Party".

- Helmet, Steel, Civilian, Civilian Protective Helmet or Zuckerman helmet: when it was found that a large number of civilians were needed to keep a lookout for fires started by incendiary bombs, an even cheaper mass-produced helmet was required. Designed by a team led by government adviser Solly Zuckerman, the thin mild steel helmet was broadly similar in shape to the military pattern but had a taller crown to the shell, providing space for the helmet to crumple. The simple liner was attached to the shell by a boot lace or string passed through holes in the shell. It was made available to civilian fire watchers at a cost of five shillings and sixpence ( equivalent to £11 in 2019) each, starting in December 1940.
- Commercial helmets: in 1939, a number of British companies began to manufacture helmets for sale to concerned civilians. These usually had the appearance of Brodie-style helmets, but were generally made of cheap materials such as cast alloys, leather, resin-impregnated fibre or even Bakelite (an early form of plastic), and offered little protection to the wearer.

=== Australia ===
- Helmet No 1, Mark II: a 1936 proposal that steel helmets should be manufactured in Australia was put into effect in 1939 by The Commonwealth Steel Company. The helmets were copies of the British Mark II but lacked the rim. More than two million were produced.

=== Belgium ===
- M1949: a post-war Belgian-made copy of the Mark II helmet. The shell was identical to the British original, except that the liner fixing screw on the crown sat in a small indentation. The liner was of Belgian design and the chinstrap was copied from the British Mark III helmet.

=== Canada ===
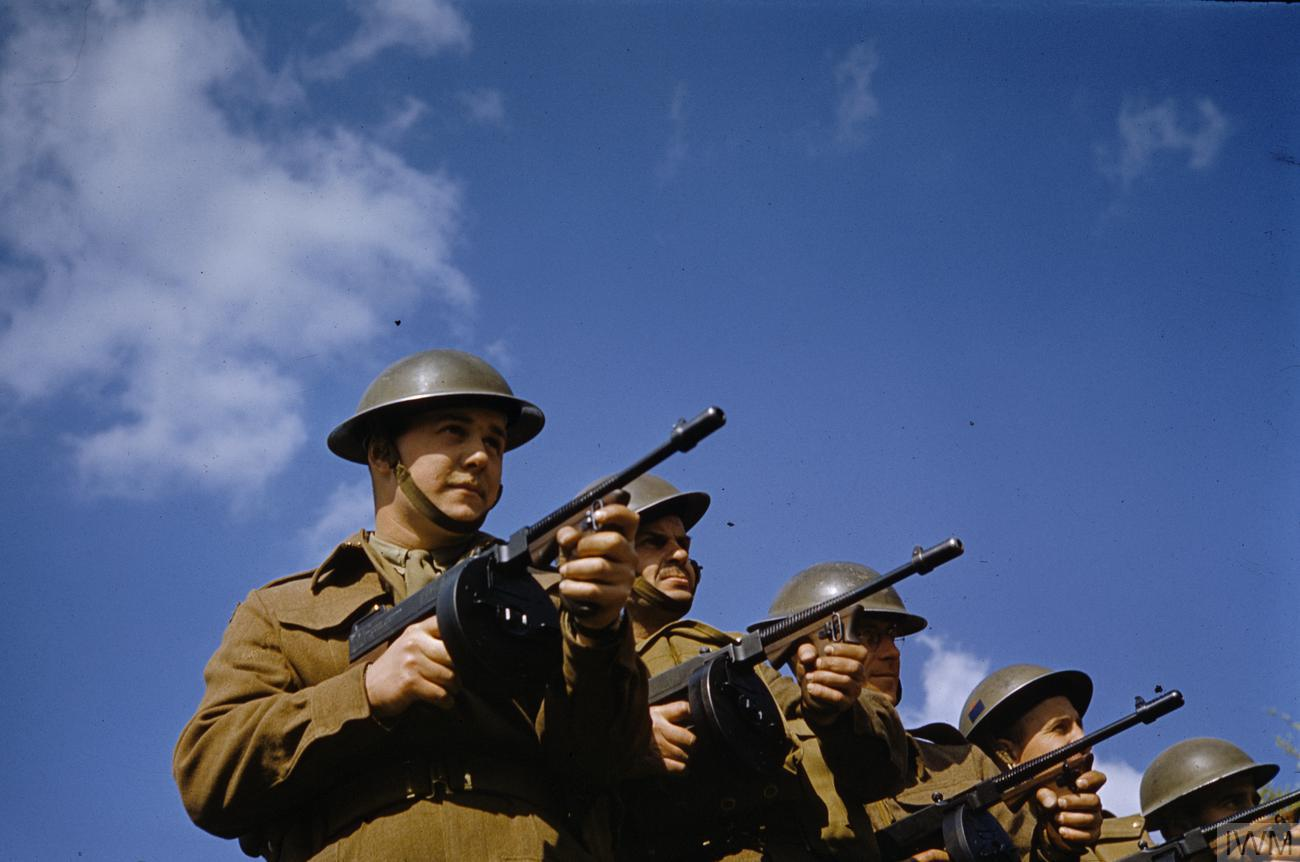
Canadian troops wearing Mark II helmets; England, 1942.

- Helmet, Steel, Mark II: having purchased British helmets in the First World War and at the outbreak of the Second, Canadian helmet production commenced in 1940. The helmets were identical to the British original, except that the rubber "bumper" pads in the lining were only fitted to horizontal helmet band and not to the vertical bands. The Mark II continued in front-line service with Canadian forces until March 1960.

=== New Zealand ===
- Helmet, Steel, Mark II: in 1940, an order for 30,000 steel helmets could not be fulfilled by the United Kingdom, so production commenced in New Zealand. Manufactured by General Motors New Zealand and the New Zealand Railway Workshops using presses and sheet steel imported from Australia, 54,000 Mark II had been made by 1942 with Australian and British liners. Surplus helmets were supplied to other Commonwealth and Empire armies.

=== Portugal ===
- M1916: on Portugal's entry into the First World War in 1916, the country lacked the facilities to produce its own helmets and looked to the United Kingdom. British helmet production at that time was giving priority to their own forces, however the Director of Munitions Supply was able to source a commercially produced version of the Brodie helmet, originally intended to be sold to British officers at the time when helmets were in short supply. Given the Portuguese designation "M1916", it equipped the Portuguese Expeditionary Corps. Made of thin-gauge steel, the bowl was fluted in an attempt to add strength. However, the fluting actually increased the chances of penetration if a missile hit one of the ridges, so some M1916s were produced with a plain bowl. A simple liner was laced to the solid shell through a series of holes.
- M1917: the Portuguese designation for the Mark I helmet, which was supplied as soon as the British production facilities became available.
- M1917/30: in 1930, the M1917 helmets were refurbished with a redesigned leather liner.

=== South Africa ===
- Helmet, Steel, Mark II: like the other Dominions in the Second World War, South Africa began to produce copies of the Mark II helmet when they became unobtainable from the United Kingdom. Manufactured by the Transvaal Steel Pressing Syndicate, some one and a half million helmets were produced. Unlike the British Mark II and other copies, the plan of the South African helmets was almost circular rather than oval. Another distinguishing feature was three small holes punched into the rear section of the brim, probably intended to allow the fitting of a neck curtain in hot climates. Surplus South African helmets were supplied to other Allied armies.

=== United States ===
- M1917: initially the United States purchased 400,000 British Mark I helmets to equip the American Expeditionary Forces in 1917, and those units which were to integrate with French formations were provided with Adrian helmets. The first US-made copies of the Mark I were supplied before the end of 1917 and some 2,700,000 had been made by the end of the war. The M1917 differed little from the British original; different rivets were used to secure the liner, the wire loop onto which the chinstrap was fixed was thicker and the rubber "doughnut" pad was not adopted. However, the US manufacturers were able to produce a shell with better ballistic protection than the original.
- M1917A1: a redesigned liner and a new webbing chinstrap were approved for service in 1934. This model went into full production in 1941, when 904,020 were produced.
- M1917 Civil Defense Helmet: this helmet was produced to equip the Civil Defense Corps at the start of the war, and differed from the standard helmet in having a simplified liner and thin webbing chinstrap.

== Users ==
- Australia
- Argentina
- Bangladesh
- British Burma
- British India
- Belgium
- Canada
- Colombia
- Dominican Republic
- Egypt
- El Salvador
- Free France
- Greece
- Guatemala
- Honduras
- India
- Indonesia
- Ireland
- Israel
- Jordan
- Luxembourg
- Malaysia
- New Zealand
- Nicaragua
- Norway
- Netherlands
- South Africa
- South Korea
- Soviet Union
- Pakistan
- Peru
- Philippines
- Poland
- Portugal
- Republic of China
- Turkey
- United Kingdom
- United States
- Venezuela

== Asbestos concerns ==
In May 2014, the UK's Health and Safety Executive, in consultation with the Imperial War Museum, advised that World War I-era helmets were not safe to handle, owing to the likelihood of their containing asbestos. It advised that schools should not allow pupils to handle such artefacts, but should instead ensure that the objects were either to be safely disposed of or to have the asbestos removed from the object allowing safe display of the object.

== See also ==
- Tommy Atkins – Nickname for a British soldier
- Doughboy – Slang for or cultural image of American infantrymen, circa 1914-1942
- Kettle hat – Steel helmet in the shape of a brimmed hat
- Zuckerman helmet – British WWII civil defence helmet
- Stahlhelm – Series of German steel combat helmets
- Adrian helmet – Combat helmet
- Hard hat – Protective industrial headwear
- Headgear of the United States Army

== Bibliography ==
- Brayley, Martin J. (2008). Tin Hats to Composite Helmets: A Collector's Guide. Crowood Press UK. ISBN 978-1847970244.
