= Civil Defence Service =

UK civil defence organisation (1935–1945)

- Active: 1935–1945
- Country: United Kingdom
- Type: Civilian volunteer organisation
- Size: 1.9 million people total

The Civil Defence Service was a civilian volunteer organisation in Great Britain during World War II. Established by the Home Office in 1935 as Air Raid Precautions (ARP), its name was officially changed to the Civil Defence Service (CD) in 1941. The Civil Defence Service included the ARP Wardens Service as well as firemen (initially the Auxiliary Fire Service (AFS) and latterly the National Fire Service (NFS)), fire watchers (later the Fire Guard), rescue, first aid post and stretcher parties. Over 1.9 million people served within the CD and nearly 2,400 lost their lives to enemy action.

== Organisation ==
The organisation of civil defence was the responsibility of each local authority. Volunteers were ascribed to different units depending on experience or training. Each local civil defence service was divided into several sections.

- Wardens were responsible for local reconnaissance and reporting, and leadership, organisation, guidance and control of the general public. Specially trained wardens, along with Police Officers, were allocated as Incident Officers to larger incidents. Wardens would also advise survivors of the locations of rest and food centres, and other welfare facilities.
- Rescue Parties were required to assess and then access buildings damaged during air raids and retrieve injured or dead people. In addition they would turn off gas, electricity and water supplies, and repair or pull down unsteady buildings. Many utility companies provided their own repair teams to liaise with rescue services
- Casualty services included first aid parties (stretcher parties in London) who provided on the spot medical assistance, along similar lines to the Hazardous area response team of today; first aid parties also provided gas decontamination services for individuals who had been impacted. More serious injuries were passed to first aid posts and to local hospitals by ambulance personnel. Seriously injured individuals could be treated on site by incident doctors and nurses. In the event of large-scale incidents, mobile first aid posts would be deployed. If required, bodies could be removed to emergency mortuaries.
- Gas Decontamination Teams were kitted out with gas-tight and waterproof protective clothing and were to deal with any gas attacks. They were trained to decontaminate buildings, roads, rail and other material that had been contaminated by liquid or jelly gases.
- Report and Control dealt with the stream of information that would be generated during an air raid. A local headquarters would have a controller who would direct rescue, medical and decontamination teams to the scenes of reported bombing. If local services were deemed insufficient to deal with the incident then the controller could request assistance from surrounding boroughs.
- Fire Guards (initially called the Fire Watchers Order in September 1940, then the Fire Watcher Service in January 1941 and then reformed as the Fire Guard in August 1941) were responsible for a designated area/building and required to monitor the fall of incendiary bombs and pass on news of any fires that had broken out to the NFS. They could deal with an individual magnesium electron incendiary bomb by dousing them in buckets of sand, water or by smothering.
- Welfare would support the injured and people bombed out of their homes. This would involve finding suitable accommodation, issuing new documentation (ration books, identity cards) and money to buy food. This also included the provision of rest centres for those bombed out who had not sustained injuries.
- Messengers would convey information from the site of bombing incidents back to the ARP headquarters. Many messengers were scouts and teenagers equipped with nothing more than a bicycle, a steel helmet and a respirator.

The Women's Voluntary Service (WVS) aided in ARP and observer duties as well as running and operating the mobile canteens and rest centres.

== Uniforms and insignia ==
Initially, in the early part of the war, ARP members had no recognisable uniform. Members would wear civilian clothes but were issued with helmets, armbands and gas masks. The first issue of uniforms in October 1939 was in the form of a blue heavy cotton drill overall (called bluette) that was issued to wardens as well as rescue parties. From February 1941 all CD services were issued with dark blue battledress and trousers for men and a four pocket serge tunic with trousers or skirt for women. A wool beret was also issued to all members. Those not issued with a uniform would be issued with a blue armband with Civil Defence written on it.

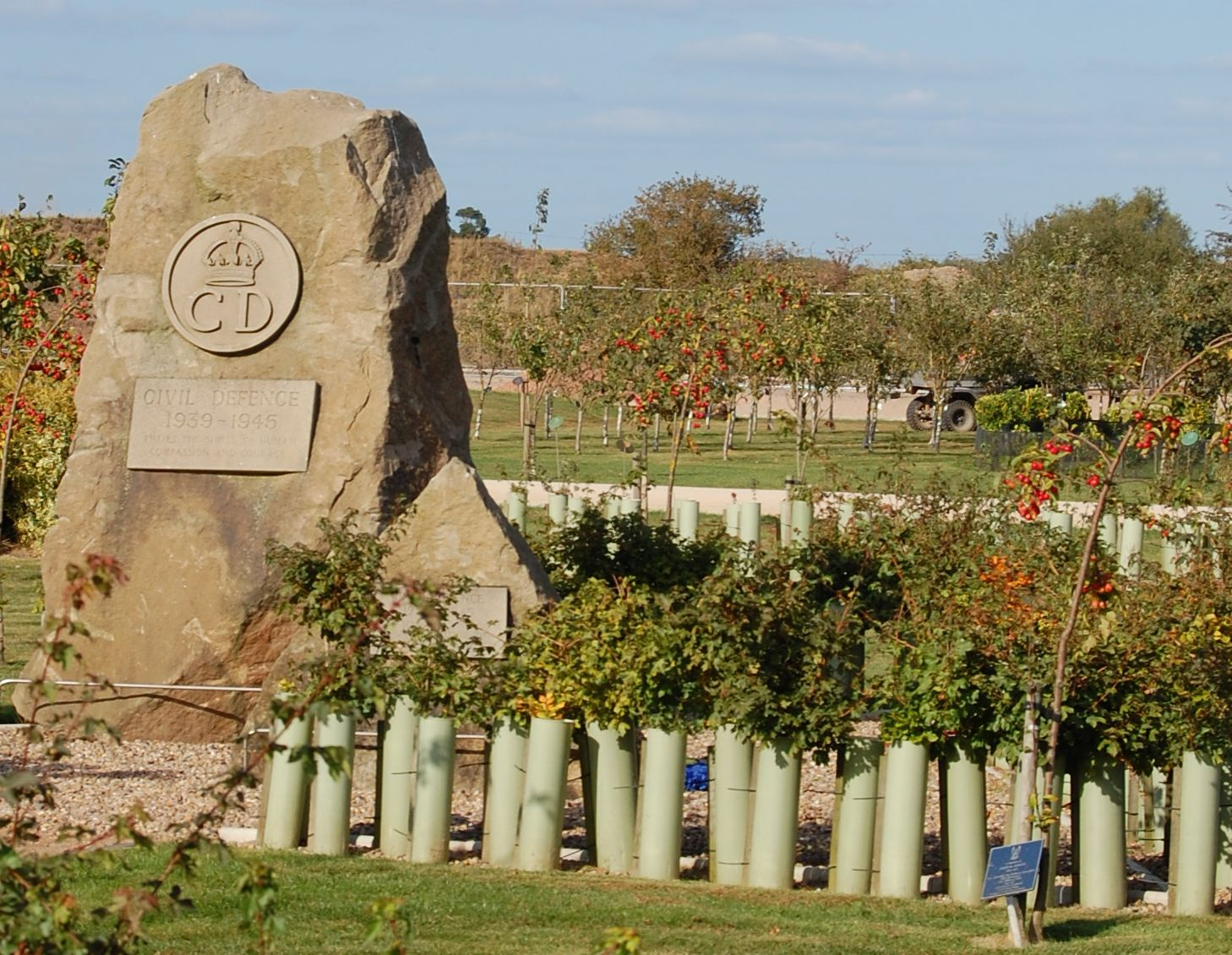
1939-1945 memorial, at the National Memorial Arboretum.

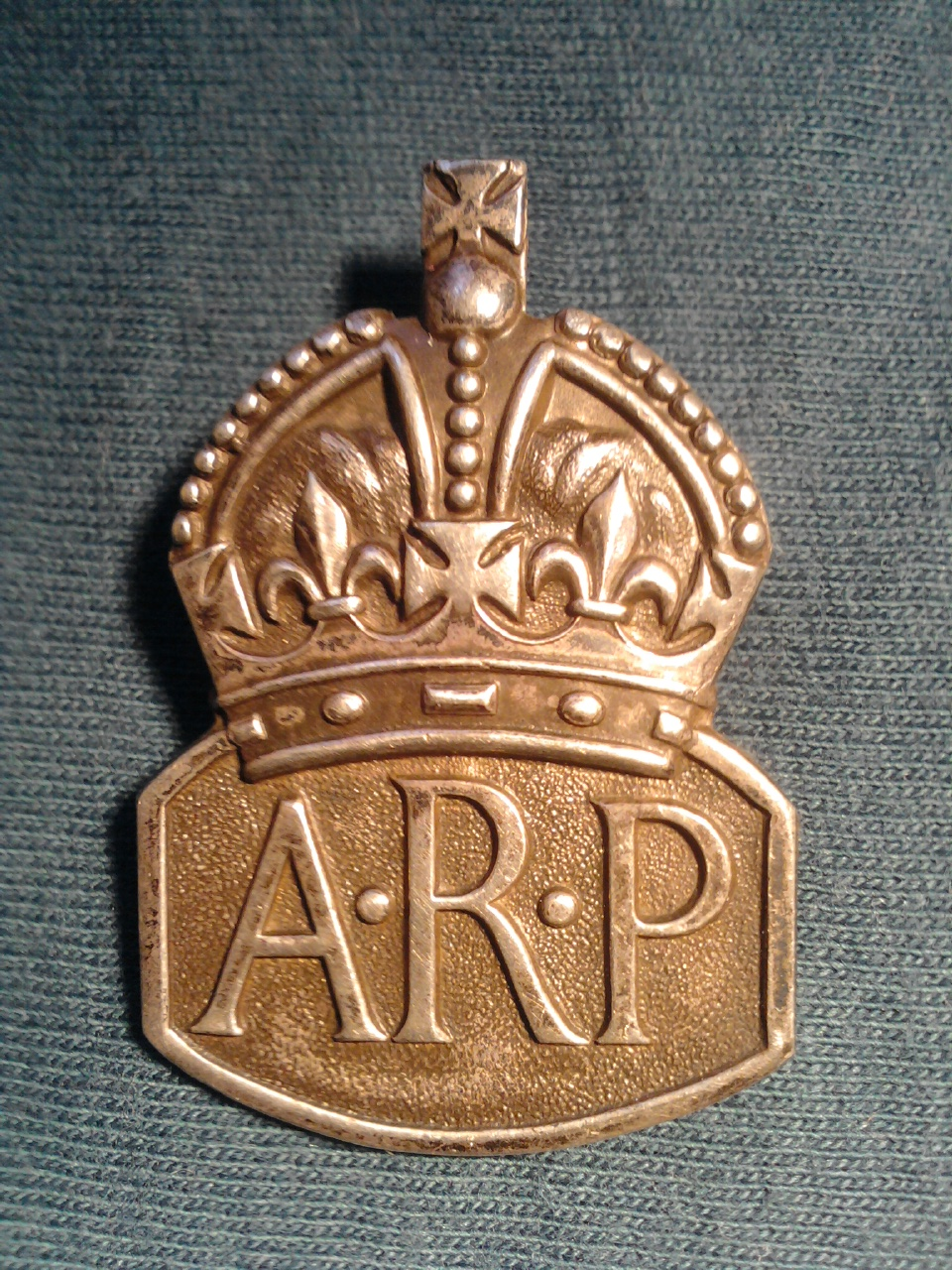
Silver 1936 ARP lapel badge

From the formation of the ARP until 1939, the badges were made of solid sterling silver, with a crescent-shaped button hole attachment for men and a pin style brooch for women. From 1940 on, the badges were made of a base metal. Civil Defence insignia included a circular breast badge worn on the left pocket incorporating the letters "CD" topped by a king's crown (in yellow on dark blue or black backing). A similar smaller badge with yellow circle around the CD and crown was used for the beret, though a large number used their silver ARP badge on their headwear.

The branch of service a member belonged to was shown on their shoulder titles. Additionally, there were instructor badges and first aid badges that could be worn as well as red chevrons each chevron for 12 months' service in the CD).

Insignia	Wardens' Service	Casualty Service	Rescue	Decontamination	Messenger
	Controller				
	Chief Warden	Medical Officer of Health	Head of Rescue Service	Head of Decontamination Service	
	Deputy Chief Warden	Deputy Medical Officer of Health/Incident Doctor	Deputy Head of Rescue Service	Deputy Head of Decontamination Service	
	Divisional Warden	Ambulance Officer	Staff Officer	Gas Identification Officer	Officer (Senior Grade)
	Staff Officer	Assistant Ambulance Officer	Assistant Staff Officer	Assistant Gas Identification Officer	Officer (Junior Grade)
	Officer (London)		Senior Rescue Officer		
	Post Warden (London)	Depot Superintendent	Depot Superintendent	Depot Superintendent	
	Head Warden	Deputy Depot Superintendent	Rescue Party Supervisor	Deputy Depot Superintendent	Officer
	Senior Warden	Shift Officer	Rescue Party Leader	Squad Leader	Officer

Rank was indicated by yellow bars 2½ inches × ¼ or ¾ inches) or chevrons:

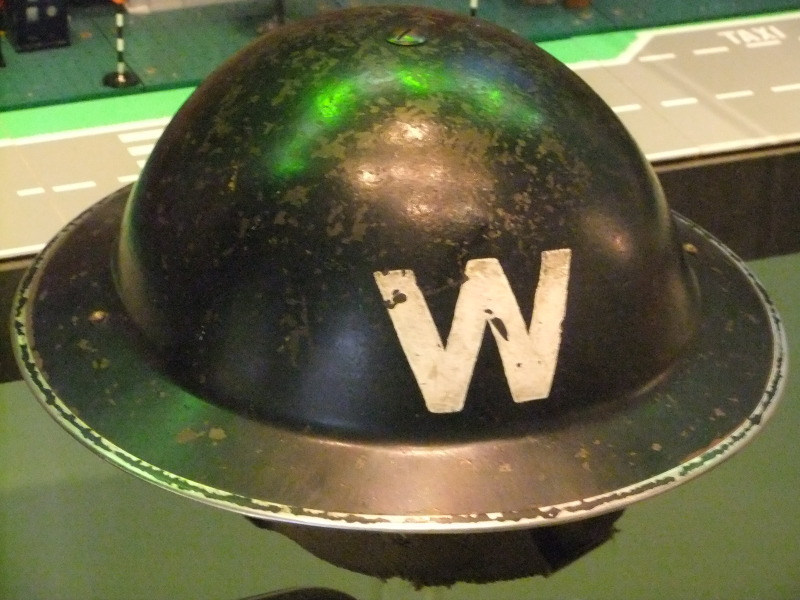
ARP warden's helmet.

Members of the various services were issued with service gas masks and steel helmets ARP service personnel were issued with Mk. II British helmets. These were often not made to the same level as issued to soldiers to reduce costs. These helmets, which had less resistance to ballistic impact, would have small holes drilled in the rim to show they were not for front line use. Depending on the role of the person the helmet would be marked with a letter or letters to easily allow others to ascertain their role at an incident.

- W for wardens (some warden/fire guards had W/FG). Rank within the warden service was denoted by a white helmet and black bands.
- R for rescue services (later HR and LR were used for heavy and light rescue parties)
- FAP for first aid parties /first aid post staff
- SP for stretcher parties (FAPs in London)
- A for ambulance staff
- M for messenger/runner
- MO for medical officer (MOH for medical officer of health)
- RP for repair party (RP/G for gas, RP/E for electricity etc)

Fire Guard officers wore the military helmet whilst lower ranking members were issued with the Zuckerman helmets) with "FG" for Fire Guard written on it. There were many variations in abbreviations, style of letter and colour.

== Disbanded ==
Text of King's speech to Civil Defence Service volunteers 1945.

The Civil Defence Service was disbanded on 2 May 1945. On 10 June 1945, before His Majesty King George VI, a farewell parade with representatives of all the Civil Defence Services from across Great Britain took place in Hyde Park, London. Many of the duties of the service were later revived as part of the Civil Defence Corps in 1949.

== See also ==
- Air Raid Precautions
- Civil Defence Corps
- Zuckerman helmet
