= Kettle hat =

Steel helmet in the shape of a brimmed hat

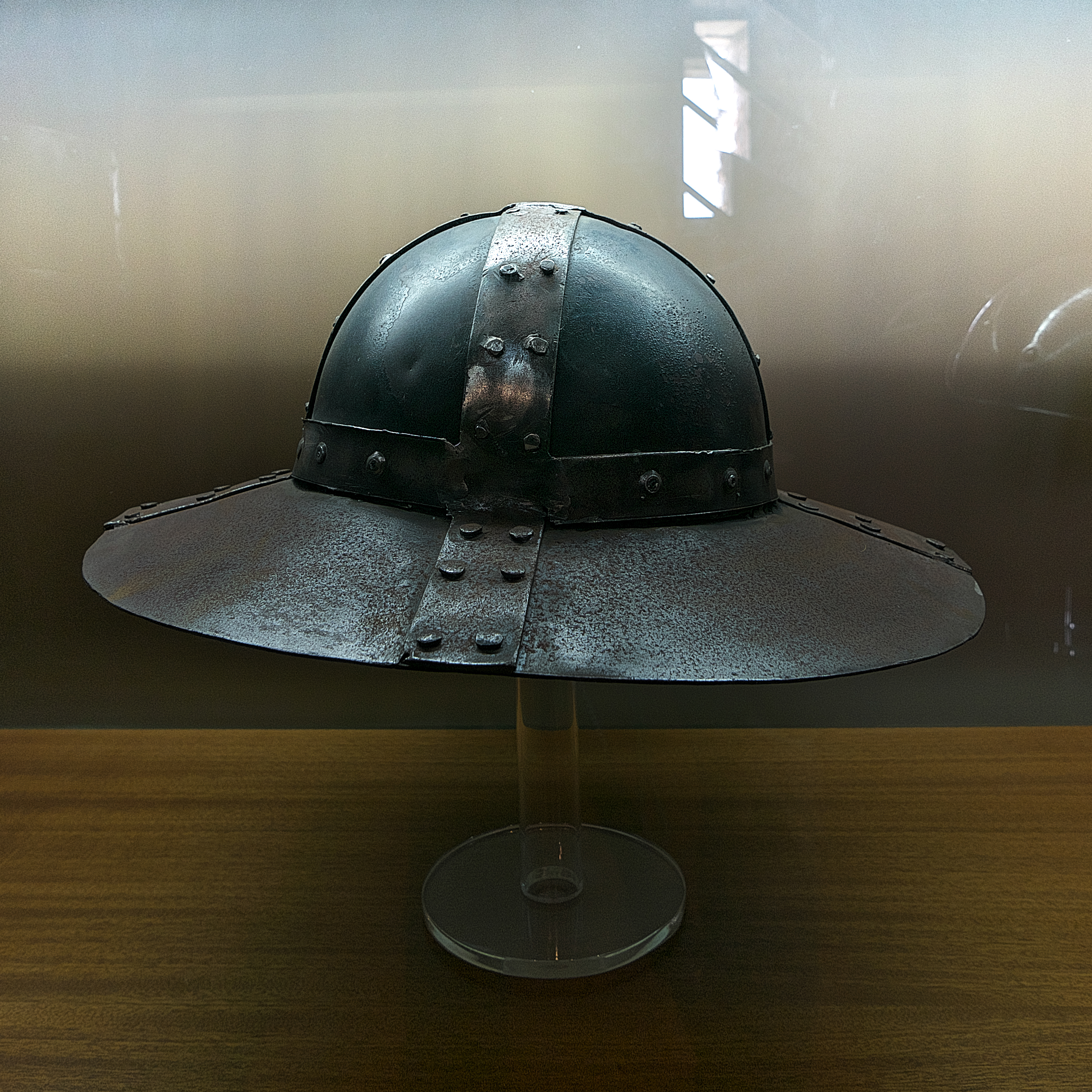
Spanish kettle hat of spangenhelm-type, multi-partite, construction, unknown date

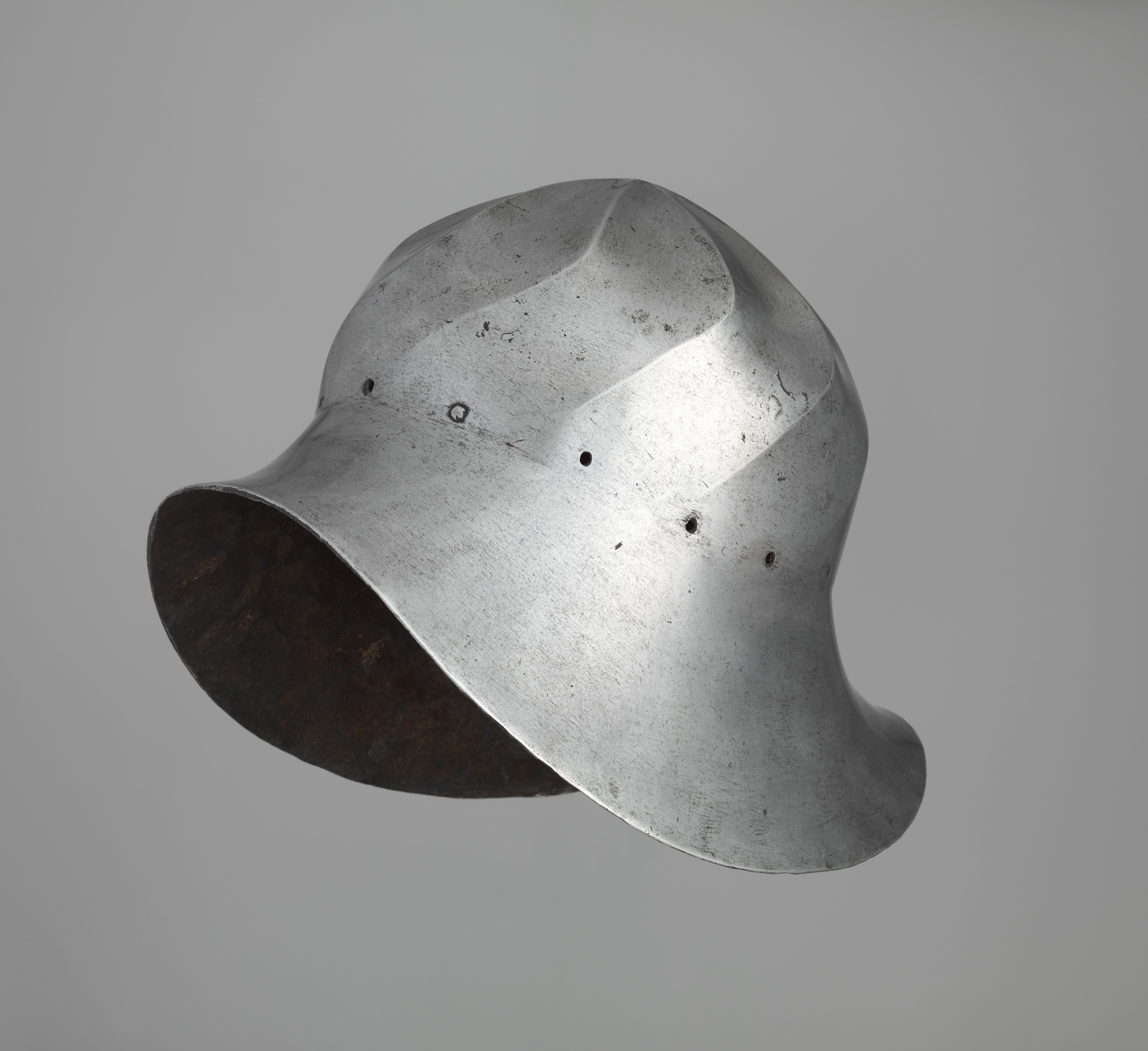
Netherlands/Burgundian kettle hat with a fluted skull, c. 1475, Metropolitan Museum of Art

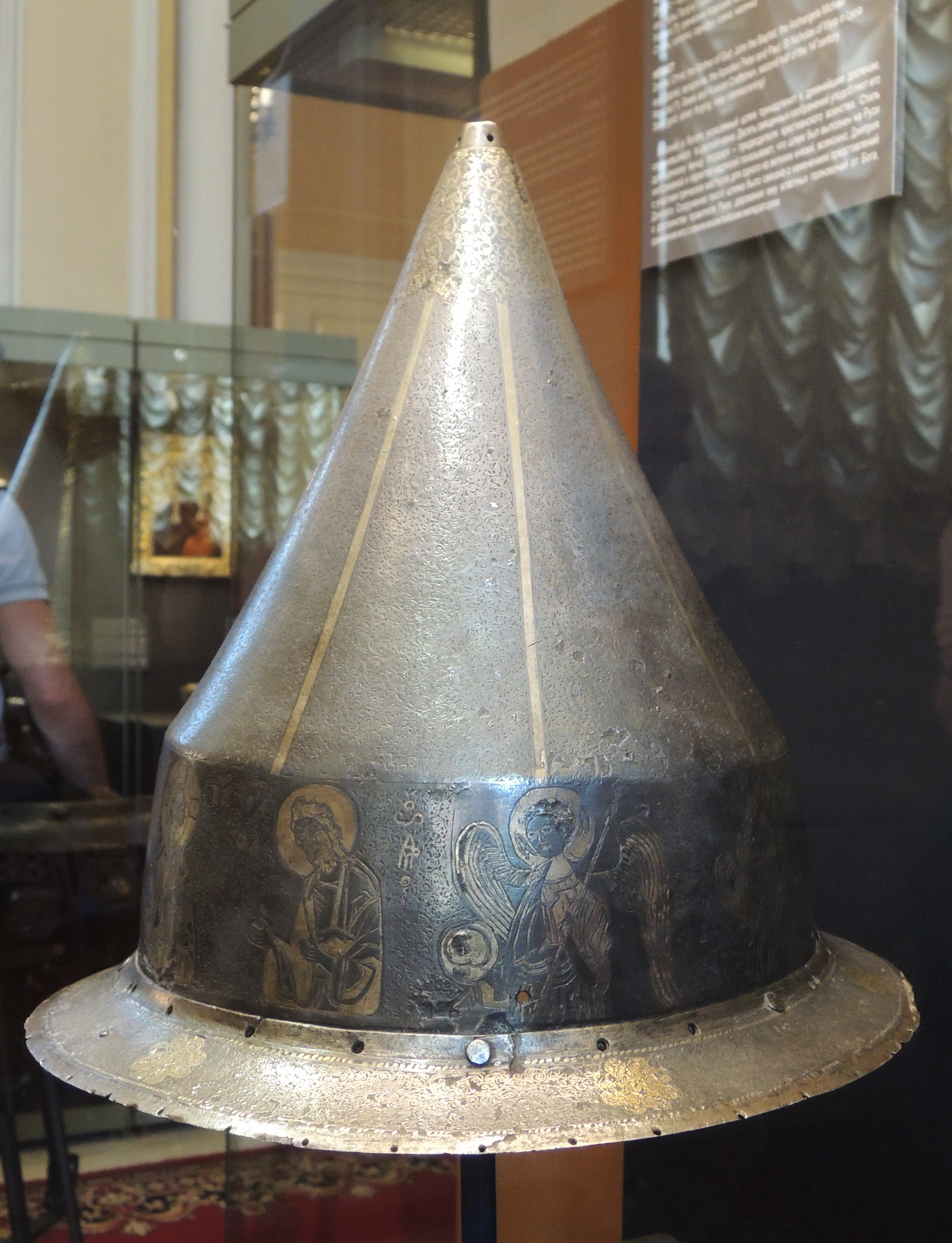
Kettle helmet of Byzantine form, attributed to Aleksandr Nevsky, made in Constantinople, c. 1265-1380, Kremlin Armory

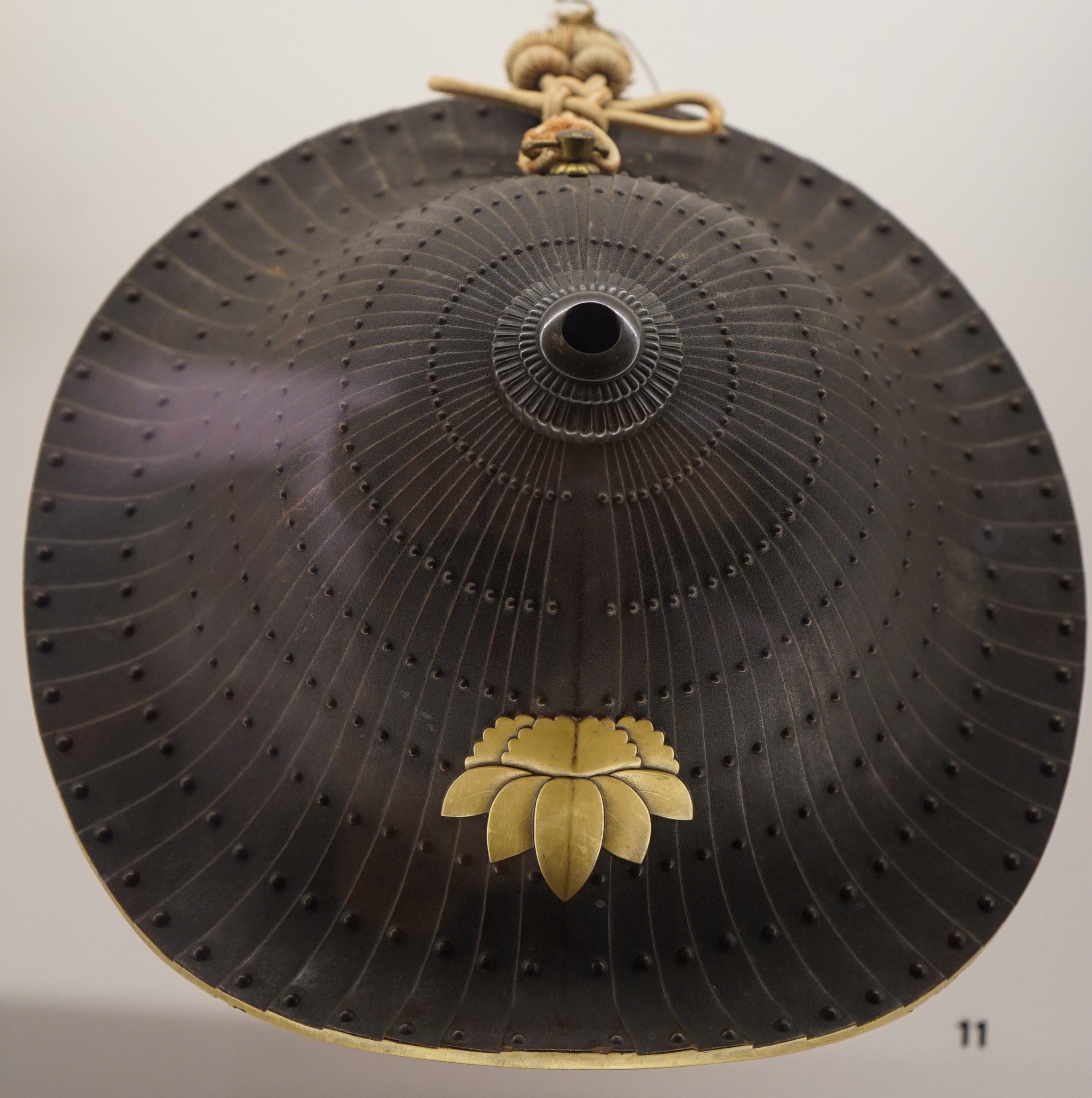
Japanese jingasa brimmed helmet, 19th century

A kettle hat or kettle helmet, also known as a war hat, was a type of combat helmet made of iron or steel in the shape of a brimmed hat. There were many design variations, with the common element being a wide brim that afforded extra protection to the wearer. It gained its common English language name from its resemblance to a metal cooking pot (the original meaning of kettle). The kettle hat was common all over Medieval Europe: it was called Eisenhut in German and chapel-de-fer in Old French (both meaning "iron hat"), cappelline or cappellino in Medieval Italian and Spanish dialects (from Medieval Latin capellinus, Classical Latin capella).

== History ==
=== Early brimmed helmets ===
The earliest forms of brimmed helmets are evidenced from the ancient world, where bronze brimmed helmets are found in the Etruscan culture of North Italy; similar helmets were also found in a hoard at Ženjak near Negova, Slovenia, hence the name "Negau Helmet." In the Hellenistic period the petasos and Boeotian helmets were widespread in the East Mediterranean. Similar helmets continued in use into the late Classical period, such as the 1st century BCE helmet from Agen/Port, and they continued in use into the Roman iron age in Gladiatorial costume. The discontinuity between Ancient and Medieval brimmed helmets argues against the former directly influencing the development of the latter, though the existence of representations on Ancient monuments and artifacts may have had a role.

=== Medieval kettle hats ===
Though brimmed helmets are depicted in illustrations of the Carolingian period, their use in this period has been questioned, and it is sometimes considered an artistic convention, resulting from the copying of earlier Late Antique Roman manuscripts. Slightly later, in 11th to 12th Byzantine manuscript illuminations occasionally depict brim-like features on some helmets, and arms and armour scholar David Nicolle has suggested that it was a Byzantine development. The earliest evidence for Medieval brimmed helmets dates to 1017, in the psalter of the Byzantine emperor Basil II. The first indication of the existence of brimmed helmets in Medieval Western Europe occurs in the first half of 12th century, in sources from the Iberian Peninsula. Byzantine kettle hats were characterised by having conical skulls, while those of the West had rounded skulls.

=== Brimmed helmets in Asia ===
In East Eurasia, Japanese Ashigaru infantrymen wore the jingasa, a helmet shaped like the Japanese form of the Asian conical hat called a kasa. Southeast Asian cultures such as Burmese, Laotian and Siamese cultures wore various kettle helmets.

== Construction and Use ==
Examples of High and Late Medieval kettle hats were typically made using one of two methods. The first was similar to the earlier spangenhelm, consisting of a bowl composed of separate, dished, triangular plates connected by a framework of iron bands, to which a brim was added. Examples of this type have been found at Marsleben Castle and Emmersdorf-on-Danube, both dating to the thirteenth century. The second method took a single-piece iron bowl and riveted on a brim, as seen in the early thirteenth century examples from Wilnsdorf Castle in Germany and Saranda Kolones Fortress in Cyprus. Another early style unique to the Baltic Region built a framework out of a single piece of iron and then joined it with infill plates, attaching a brim, such as the thirteenth century helmet from Kodasoo in Estonia. These styles remained common into the early 14th century, but by the end of the 14th century kettle hats were commonly being raised from a single piece of iron. This is exemplified by a Western European-made kettle hat (c. 1380–1400) of a one-piece construction, found in London.

Kettle hats were worn most commonly by infantry, however, they were also used by cavalry and men-at-arms. While broadly considered a simple design requiring less time and skill to produce than some other helmet types, several ostentatious examples suggest they could be objects of great prestige and expense, such as the parade helmet of Charles VI or the helmet attributed to Aleksandr Nevsky. The wide brim provided additional protection against blows and projectiles from above. It could be worn with or without a mail coif, standing mail collar (standard) or plate gorget, and some artistic depictions suggest that they were secured by chin straps, although most depictions suggest the helmets were fitted to the brow as with earlier nasal helmets. The kettle hat had an advantage over some other types of helmets of the period in that it did not interfere with the wearer's vision, hearing or breathing.

== Later Influences ==
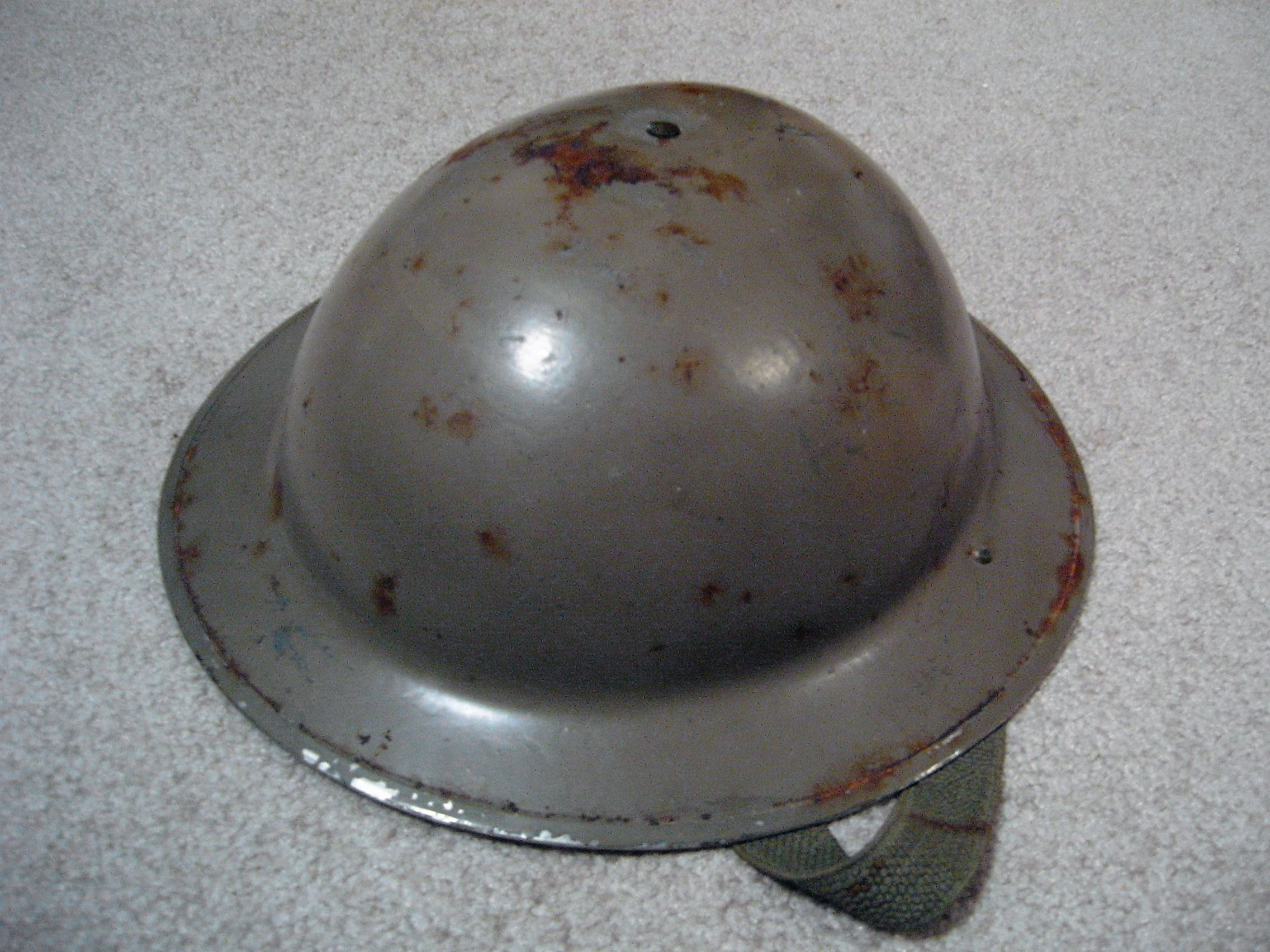
A British Mark II steel Brodie helmet as issued in the Second World War

When steel helmets reappeared in World War I, the kettle hat made its comeback as the British Brodie helmet (often called tin hat), as well as the French Adrian helmet. These kettle helmets were also used in World War II by the British, Commonwealth forces (such as Australia and Canada). The British produced a helmet for civilian use in World War II designed to give more protection to the head and neck from above.

== See also ==
- Adrian helmet
- Brodie helmet
- Sallet
- Stahlhelm

== Bibliography ==
- Absolon, T, (2017) Samurai Armour: Volume I, The Japanese Cuirass, Osprey Publishing, Oxford
- Bedford, John (1968) The Collecting Man, D. McKay, New York.
- Connolly, P., Gillingham, J. and Lazenby, J. (1999) The Hutchinson Dictionary of Ancient and Medieval Warfare, Routledge ISBN 9781135936747
- Gosk, D. (2021) Ancient Brimmed Helmets as Introduction to Medieval Kettle Hats?, “Fasciculi Archaeologiae Historicae” 34, 139-152, DOI 10.23858/FAH34.2021.010
- Hood, J. (2012) A Late Fourteenth-Century Transitional Kettle-Hat Found in London, Arms & Armour, 9:2, 154-180, DOI: 10.1179/1741612411Z.0000000002
- De Vries, R. and Smith, R.D. (2012) Medieval Military Technology, Second Edition, University of Toronto Press, Toronto ISBN 9781442604995
- Nicolle, David (1996). Medieval Warfare Source Book Vol. II. Arms and Armour, London. ISBN 1-86019-861-9.
