= Zuckerman helmet =

British WWII civil defence helmet

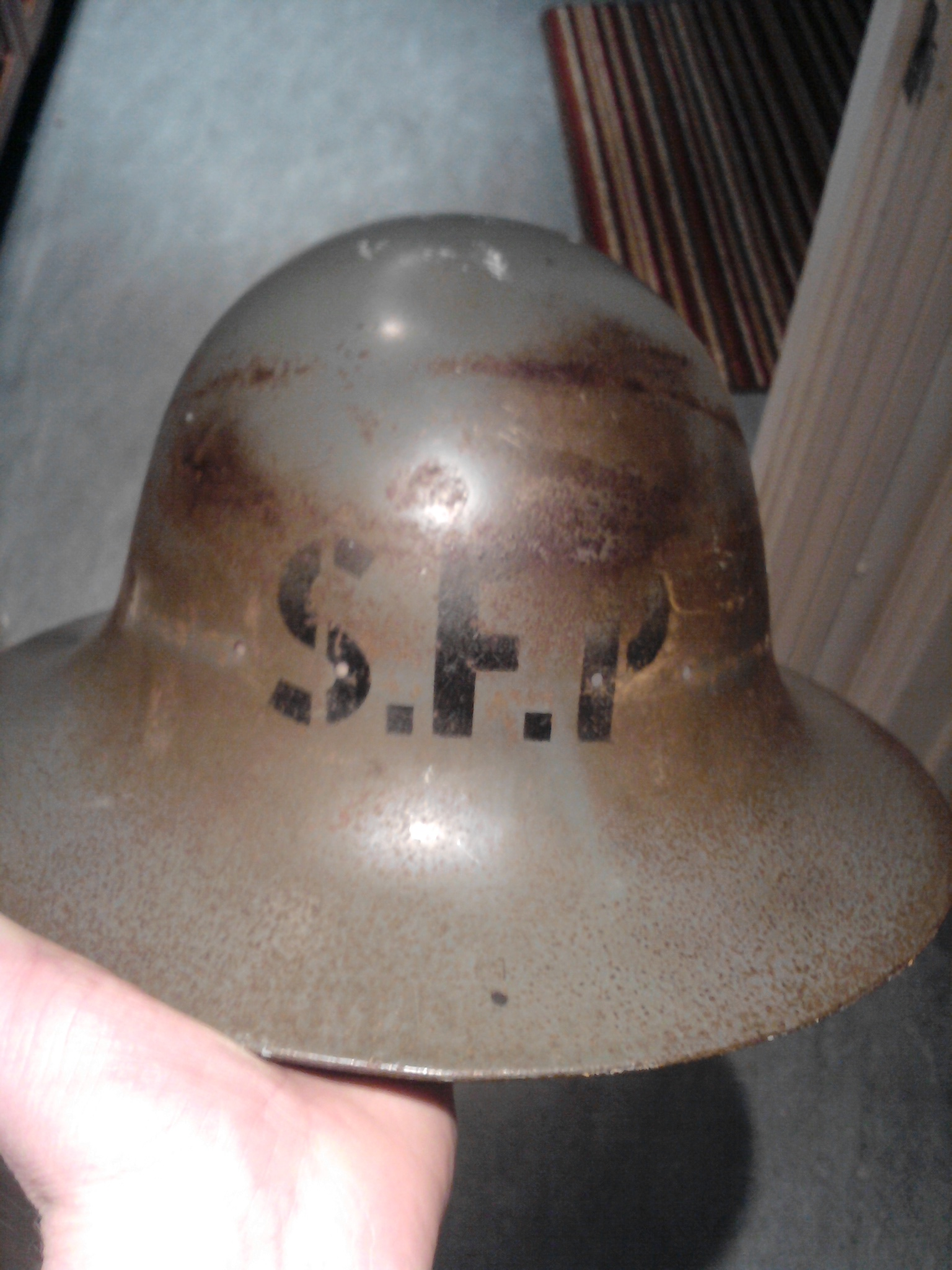
Zuckerman Helmet with SFP markings

The Zuckerman helmet, officially designated the Civilian Protective Helmet, was a helmet designed for use by civil defence organisations and the general public in the United Kingdom during World War II. It was researched and designed by Solly Zuckerman, Derman Christopherson and Hugh Cairns and manufactured between 1940 and 1942.

== Background ==
Zuckerman and Cairns first started looking into a design for a helmet to aid civil defence in mid-1940. Their aim was to provide a helmet that could deal with impact from falling and flying masonry and provide more coverage for the head and the neck areas.

After the War Office accepted their design, the Civilian Protective Helmet went into circulation in December 1940 and was made until 1942, the vast majority being dated 1941.

== Production ==
Helmets were made from pressed mild steel or manganese steel (known for its impact resistance) in two sizes only and sometimes marked with either M (medium) or L (large) on the inside of the brim. The design of the high dome was to allow the helmet to withstand impact and still protect the wearer. Many have two single holes opposite each other on the brim. The marking details the amount of resistance the helmet offered to ballistic impact (that being the lowest and therefore not for use as a frontline helmet). The helmet was available in a number of colours: white, black, grey and olive green.

A helmet liner made of leather and webbing was attached to the helmet with string, shoelace or leather thong that was threaded through 16 drilled slightly angled holes around the helmet to hold it in place. Small loops were incorporated on the helmet for attaching a chinstrap, but no official strap was issued though many used the Mk II helmet chinstrap. Consequently, helmets can be found with numerous chin strap variations.

The helmet was manufactured by a number of companies such as the Austin Motor Co. and Morris Motors.

Code	Maker	Location
A.M.C.	Austin Motor Company	Longbridge
BMB	Briggs Motor Bodies Ltd	Dagenham
E.C&CO	E Camelinat & Co Ltd	Birmingham
JSS	Joseph Sankey & Sons Ltd	Bilston
MMOR	Morris Motors	Cowley
PCH	Unknown	Unknown
PSC	Pressed Steel Company	Cowley
RO&CO	Rubery Owen Co. Ltd	Leeds
VM	Vauxhall Motors	Luton

== Gallery ==
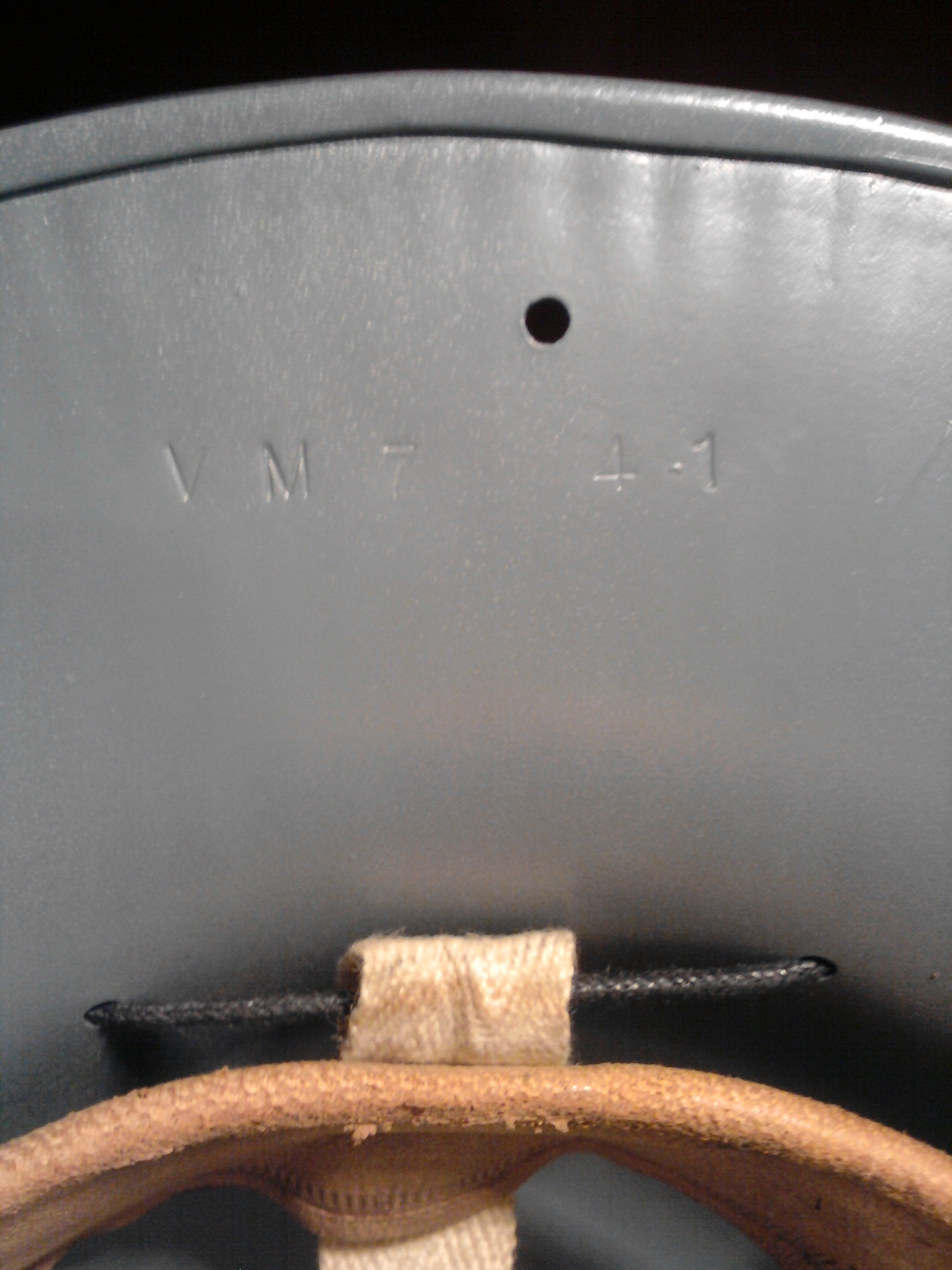
Zuckerman helmet maker mark

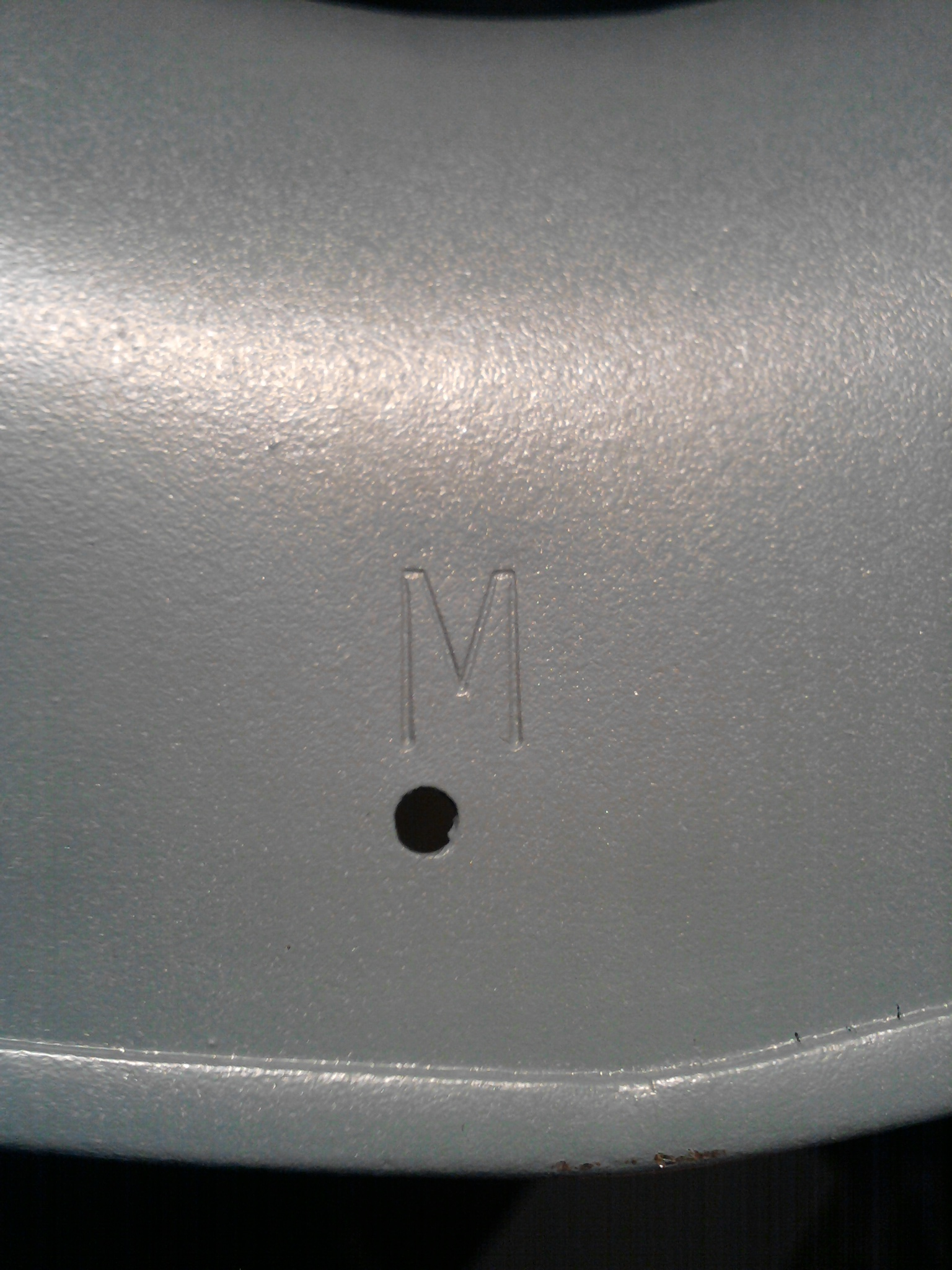
Zuckerman helmet size marker - M

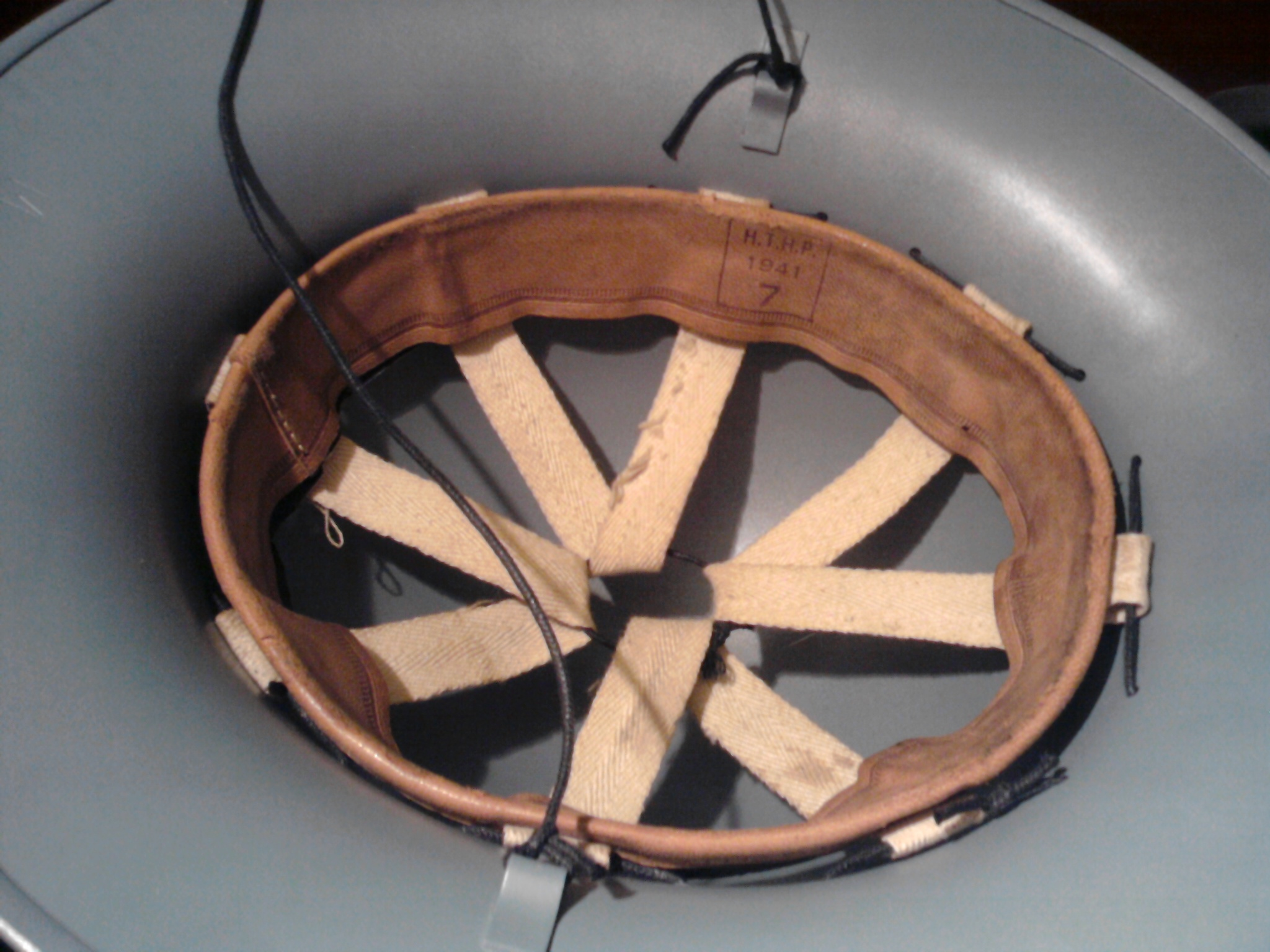
Zuckerman helmet liner (1941)

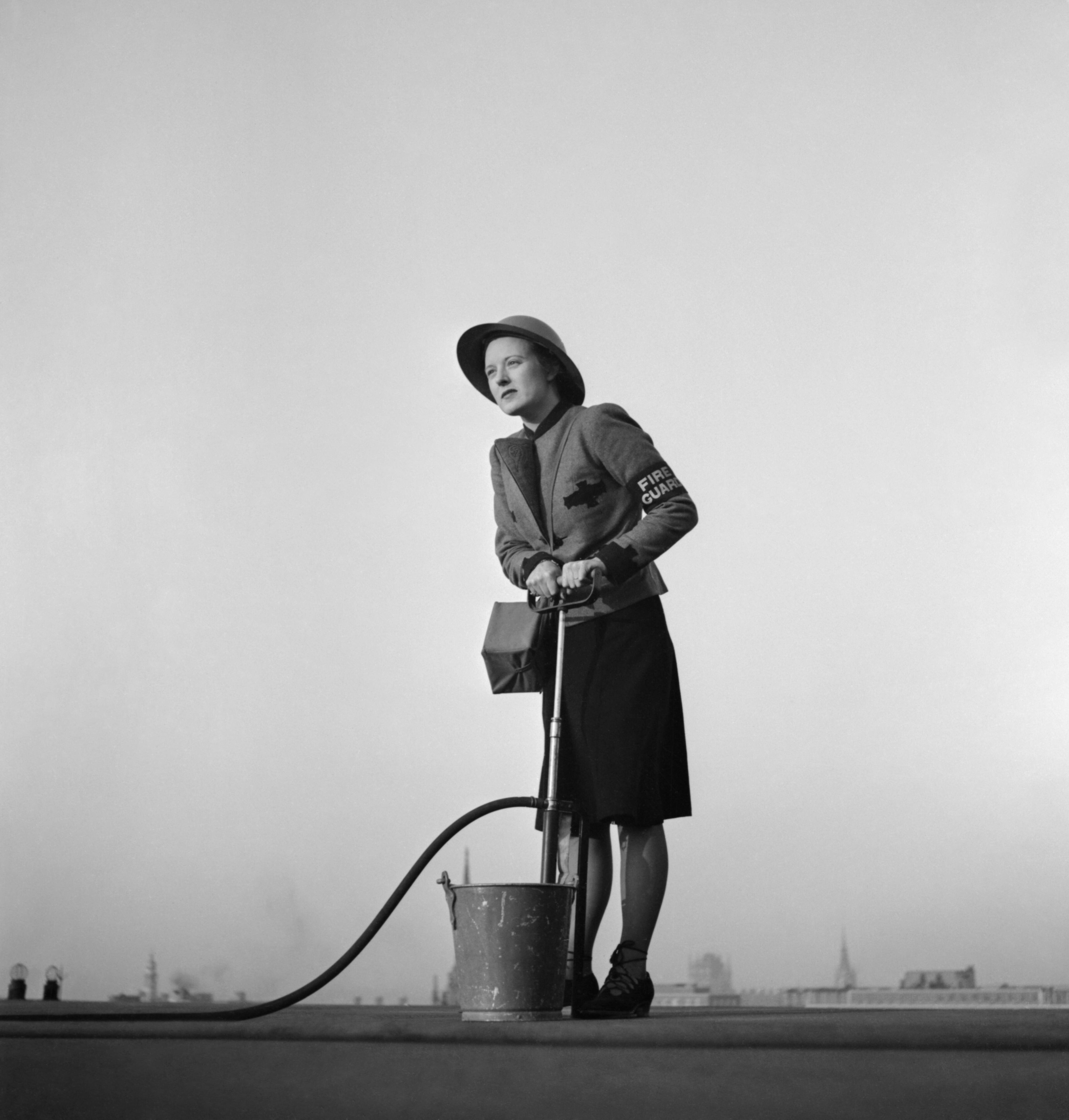
A Fire Guard in London, 1941, wearing a Zuckerman helmet.

== Service ==
Zuckerman helmets were issued to Civil Defence personnel such as Fire Guards, Street Fire Parties and factory workers. They were also on sale to the general public for 5 shillings and sixpence (5s 6d). (equivalent to £14 in 2025) When used by Fire Guards and Street Fire Party personnel, the helmets were marked accordingly with FG or SFP. Bands around the helmet (often in black) would denote seniority within the Fire Guard service. The fire service declined to use the Zuckerman helmet since it preferred the Mk II helmet.
