= Charles Evenden =

English cartoonist

- Born: 1 October 1894; London, England
- Died: 1 April 1961 (aged 66); Durban, South Africa
- Other name: EVO
- Education: Haggerston Road School
- Occupation: Editorial cartoonist
- Notable credit: Founder of the MOTH
- Title: MOTH O
- Spouse: Reenie Carlos
- Children: 1 son and 1 daughter

Charles Evenden (1 October 1894 – 1 April 1961) was an English cartoonist, known as the founder and guiding inspiration of the ex-servicemen organisation known as the Memorable Order of Tin Hats.

== Early life ==
Charles Alfred Evenden, the eldest of the thirteen children was born in London to John Charles Evenden of Kent and his wife, Elizabeth Gregory on 1 October 1894.

He was educated at Haggerston Road School in the London Borough of Hackney. At the age of twelve, he was top of the school and remained there for two years, winning two scholarships to Charterhouse School. However, his parents did not have the means to send him to Charterhouse and found him a job in a factory instead of half-a-crown a week. To supplement his income he took to selling newspapers. While doing this he began studying newspaper cartoons. This inspired him in the drawing classes he attended and on one occasion he sent a cartoon to the Daily Express. The psychological effect of this act was to influence his whole life.

== World War I ==
He joined the Australian Army in World War I and was sent to Egypt. As a member of the Australian and New Zealand Army Corps, he took part in the Gallipoli campaign until he was badly shell-shocked and evacuated to Malta. He was hospitalised in England and at the cessation of hostilities returned to a farming life in Australia.

== Post-war years ==
His farming efforts proved to be financially unsuccessful, and he took up newspaper work in Melbourne. After a brief period, he decided to try newspaper life in South Africa. In 1923 he arrived in Durban where he joined the staff of The Natal Mercury as its cartoonist under the nom-de-plume of "EVO". He remained with the paper from 1924 until 1953. With the startling simplicity of his ideas, he soon made a name for himself. To emphasise his attitude towards politicians and bureaucrats he created two characters, "Dr Mug" and "Mr Wump". His brand of Cockney humour had a special appeal for the newspaper's readers.

== Memorable Order of Tin Hats ==
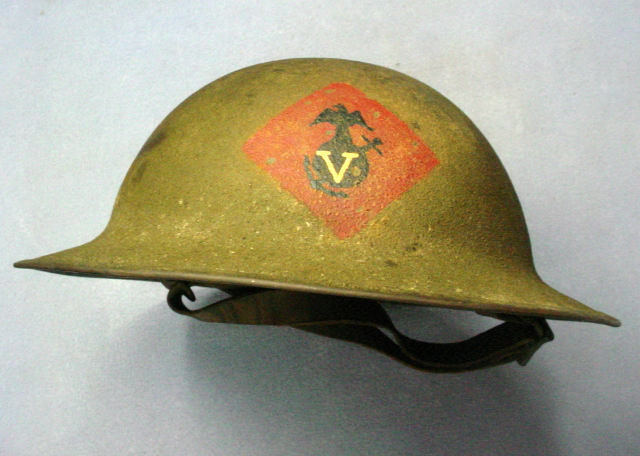
1917 Brodie pattern helmet

According to the Dictionary of South African Biography, one night in 1927 after he and the editor of The Natal Mercury, RJ Kingston Russell, had seen a war film, Evenden was persuaded to draw a cartoon on 'remembrance'. According to the Dictionary, "The cartoon showed a tin helmet surmounted by a burning candle. Around the flames of the candle were six words – True Comradeship – Mutual Help – Sound Memory".

However, the official MOTH website carries a cartoon captioned Forgetfulness and this led to the founding of the Order. This is confirmed by the Eastern Province Herald which describes the cartoon as follows: "a bullet- and shrapnel-riddled Allied helmet awash in the ocean. In the background a steamship passes over the horizon, leaving the forgotten, ghostly form of a veteran forlornly wading through the water."

The concepts of True Comradeship, Mutual Help and Sound Memory were to become the inspiration of an organisation of ex-front line soldiers, of all ranks, known as the Memorable Order of Tin Hats (MOTH). Evenden, the founder of the movement and its inspiration, was given the title of 'Moth O' – a position he held until his death."

Lapel badge worn by members of the MOTH

The membership of the MOTH movement, under Evenden's direction and leadership, grew into thousands. Men and women of two world wars, of the Second Anglo Boer War (1899–1902) and even those of former enemy forces streamed into its ranks. All who were prepared to keep alive the memories of comradeship and self-sacrifice were welcomed and made at home in shellholes. The shellholes spread to the United Kingdom, Australia, New Zealand and to Rhodesia (Zimbabwe). Membership was extended to those who had participated in the South African Border War.

The MOTH national headquarters is situated in Warriors Gate, Durban, which is modelled on a Norman design from a photograph given to Evenden by Admiral Evans-of-the-Broke. In 1948 Evenden opened Mount Memory ,- a monument to the missing and dead of the Second World War, in the foothills of the Drakensberg mountains.

== Family life ==
He married Reenie Carlos and had a son, Barrie, and a daughter. Barrie was posted as missing in action when his ship was torpedoed by a U-boat in the Mediterranean Sea.

After he died in Durban on 1 April 1961 Evenden was cremated, and his ashes were scattered over the Durban bay.

== Writings ==
Evenden wrote the story of how the MOTH organisation was created in his book Old soldiers never die (Durban, 1952). He was also the author of Like a little candle (Durban, 1959).

== Recognition ==
In 1955 he was received by Queen Elizabeth, the Queen Mother, at Clarence House.

On 11 November 1955, the freedom of the city of Durban was conferred on him, at a parade of 14 000 Moths, by the then Mayor, Councillor Vernon Essery.
