= Memorable Order of Tin Hats =

South African veterans' organisation

- Badge
- Abbreviation: M.O.T.H.
- Formation: 7 May 1927; 99 years ago
- Founder: Moth O
- Type: Ex-service organisation
- Legal status: Charity NPO & NGO, (MESCA)
- Purpose: True Comradeship, Mutual Help, Sound Memory
- Headquarters: Flame Lily Park Retirement Homes, Malvern, Durban, South Africa
- Region served: South Africa and Worldwide
- Official language: English
- M.O.T.H National Chairman: Anders "Andy" Boden
- Board of directors: National Executive Members
- Publication: The Home Front
- Subsidiaries: Ex-Servicemen's Cottage Association; M.O.T.H. Women's Auxiliary; M.O.T.H. Motorcycle Association
- Affiliations: Royal Commonwealth Ex-Services League
- Website: www.moth.org.za

The Memorable Order of Tin Hats (M.O.T.H.) was founded in 1927 by Charles Evenden as a brotherhood of South African former front-line soldiers. Its stated purpose is to help comrades in need, either financially or physically, and to remember all servicemen who have answered the Sunset Call, both in war and peacetime.

== Formation ==
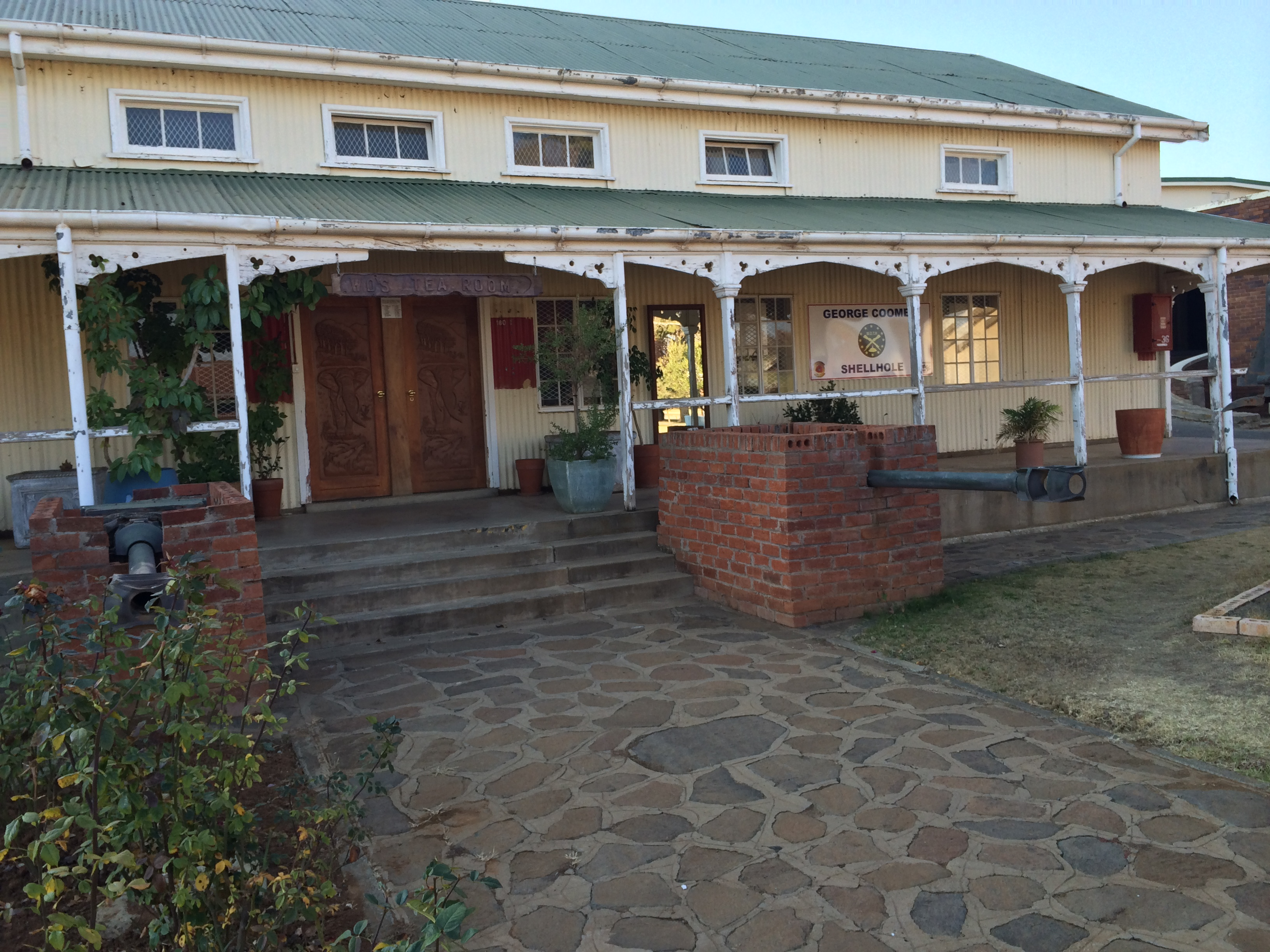
M.O.T.H. Shellhole, Bloemfontein.

According to the Dictionary of South African Biography, one night in 1927 after he and the editor of The Natal Mercury, RJ Kingston Russell, had seen a war film, Charles Evenden was persuaded to draw a cartoon on 'remembrance'. According to the Dictionary, "The cartoon showed a tin helmet surmounted by a burning candle. Around the flames of the candle were six words – True Comradeship – Mutual Help – Sound Memory".

However, the official M.O.T.H. website carries a cartoon captioned Forgetfulness and this led to the founding of the Order. This is confirmed by the Eastern Province Herald which describes the cartoon as follows: "a bullet- and shrapnel-riddled Allied helmet awash in the ocean. In the background a steamship passes over the horizon, leaving the forgotten, ghostly form of a veteran forlornly wading through the water."

"The concepts of True Comradeship, Mutual Help and Sound Memory were to become the inspiration of an organisation of ex-front-line soldiers, of all ranks, known as M.O.T.H. Evenden, as the founder of the movement and its guiding inspiration was given the title of Moth O – a position he held until his death."

The membership of the M.O.T.H. movement, under Evenden's leadership, grew to thousands. Men and women of two world wars, of the Second Anglo Boer War (1899–1902) and even those of former enemy forces joined the organisation. Meeting places are called "shell holes", and have been opened in Ireland, Malawi, Namibia, Zambia, Zimbabwe and a "cyber shell hole" for members all over the globe. Membership was also extended to those who had participated in the South African Border War.

== Warrior's Gate M.O.T.H. Museum of Militaria and Moth Sanctuary, Durban ==
The museum, located in Durban, is modelled on a Norman design from a photograph given to Evenden by Admiral Evans-of-the-Broke. The exhibits extend from the Anglo-Zulu War, 1st and 2nd Boer wars, WW1, WW2, Korean war, Vietnam war, Rhodesian war, and the SWA border war periods.

== Memorials ==
In 1948 Evenden opened Mount Memory, a monument to the missing and dead of the Second World War, in the foothills of the Drakensberg mountains. Moths are remembered on the Memorial wall, those who have answered the Sunset Call. The Moth Gardens of Remembrance accommodate the Delville Wood Weeping Cross in Pietermaritzburg. There are also numerous Moth Memorials around the country, managed by the local Moth Shellhole in that area.

== Eligibility for membership ==
- In any War prior to 1939 as a member of the fighting forces, including medical or other auxiliary units of such forces. This includes all wars and campaigns in any country.
- In World War II and subsequent campaigns as members of the Union Defence Force outside the borders of the Union on active service.
- As full-time members of the Union Defence Force, in the Coastal or Coast Garrison Artillery and the South African Air Force Squadrons engaged in seaward patrols. This includes ex-members of the Radar Service and coastal crash boat crew serving with the Artillery Batteries and SAAF Squadrons mentioned above.
- As full-time members of the South African Naval Forces outside the Union or in the coastal defence of the Union. As members of the British or Allied Forces – air, navy or army – Great Britain or abroad.
- As officers or ratings in ships of the Allied Merchant Service at sea during World War I and World War II and minor campaigns. As full-time members of the Air Auxiliary Services of the Allied Forces (Such as BOAC) who served in combat areas in support of the Allied Forces in World War II.
- With the Underground Resistance Movements (Partisan Force) during World War of 1939–45 on the side of the original Allies.
- As full-time servicemen or women in minor campaigns, including the Korean War (1950–53), Mau Mau Uprising (1952–56), Malayan Emergency (1948–60), Cyprus Emergency (1955–59), Suez Crisis (1956–57), the Jewish insurgency in Palestine (1946–49) Aden Emergency – (1964–67), Indonesia–Malaysia confrontation (1962–68), or the Troubles (1969–) who are in possession of the General Service Medal and/or Northern Ireland Clasp.
- As members of the Rhodesian Security Forces in the Rhodesian Bush War.
- As members of the United States Armed Forces or their respective allies in the Vietnam War, Yugoslav wars, and the Gulf War.
- As members of the South African Police or British South Africa Police in possession of the South African Police Medal for Combating Terrorism or the Rhodesian General Service Medal.
- As contemporary South African military personnel:
  - who served in a South African Defence Force (SADF) operational area, namely South West Africa, Angola, Mozambique or the South African border.
  - who have been directly engaged in operations anywhere in South Africa from 1 December 1983 until 2 February 1990.
  - actively engaged in operations after 2 February 1990 until 27 April 1994.
  - who since 1994 have received a campaign medal or clasp for military operations including peace keeping forces and operations in: Lesotho, Democratic Republic of the Congo, Burundi, Mozambique and Sudan. These campaigns will be updated from time to time at GHQ meetings.

== See also ==
- Remembrance Day
- Der Stahlhelm
- Veterans of Foreign Wars of the United States
