= M26 =

M26, M-26, or M.26 may refer to:

- M-26 (aero-engine) a soviet 1930s aero-engine for autogyros and helicopters
- M26 (apple), a Malling series apple rootstock
- M-26 artillery rocket, a short-range antipersonnel rocket
- M26 grenade, a United States military hand grenade
- M-26 (Michigan highway), a state highway in Michigan in the United States
- M26 Modular Accessory Shotgun System, a lightweight shotgun system
- M26 motorway, a motorway in the United Kingdom
- M26 Pershing, an American tank used during World War II and the Korean War
- M26 Tractor, a component of the M25 Tank Transporter (nicknamed "Dragon Wagon"), a United States Army World War II tractor-trailer combination used for transporting and recovering tanks
- M26 taser, a model of the Taser from Axon.
- Macchi M.26, an Italian flying boat fighter prototype of 1924
- Miles M.26, an unbuilt Miles Aircraft project
- Messier 26 (or M26), an open star cluster in the constellation Scutum
- HMS Plover (M26), a British minelayer
- M26 (Cape Town), a Metropolitan Route in Cape Town, South Africa
- M26 (Pretoria), a Metropolitan Route in Pretoria, South Africa
- M26 (Durban), a Metropolitan Route in Durban, South Africa
- M26 (Port Elizabeth), a Metropolitan Route in Port Elizabeth, South Africa
- Hjälm m/26, a Swedish steel military helmet
- M1926 helmet (Spain), a Spanish steel military helmet
- Lahti-Saloranta M/26, a Finnish light machine gun
- McLaren M26, a Formula One racing car
