= M1937 =

M1937 may refer to:

- M1937 Revolver
- 152 mm howitzer-gun M1937 (ML-20)
- 45 mm anti-tank gun M1937 (53-K)
- M1937 helmet
