= M1921 helmet (Spain) =

Combat helmet

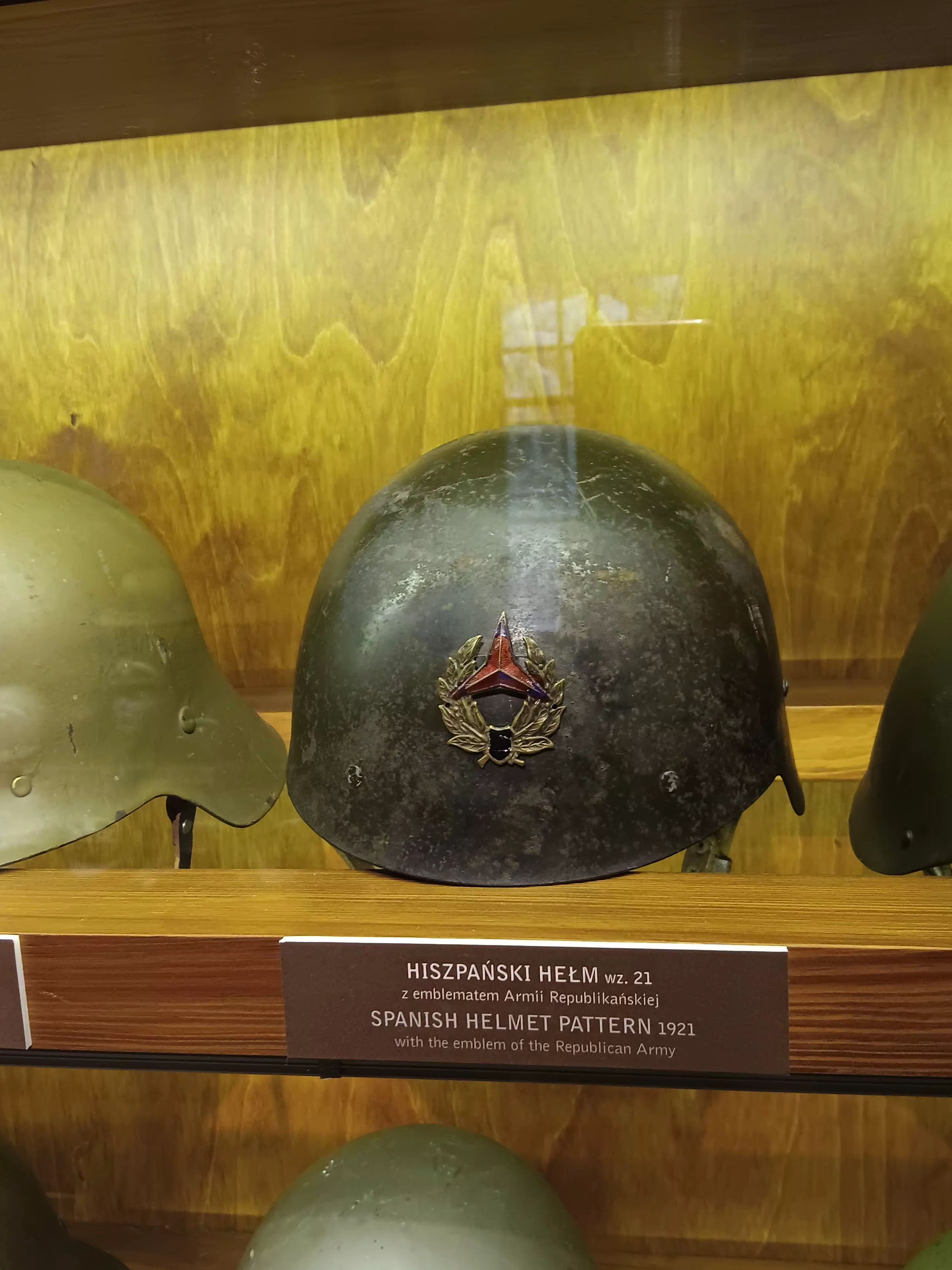
Spanish M21 helmet bearing the emblem of the Republican Army

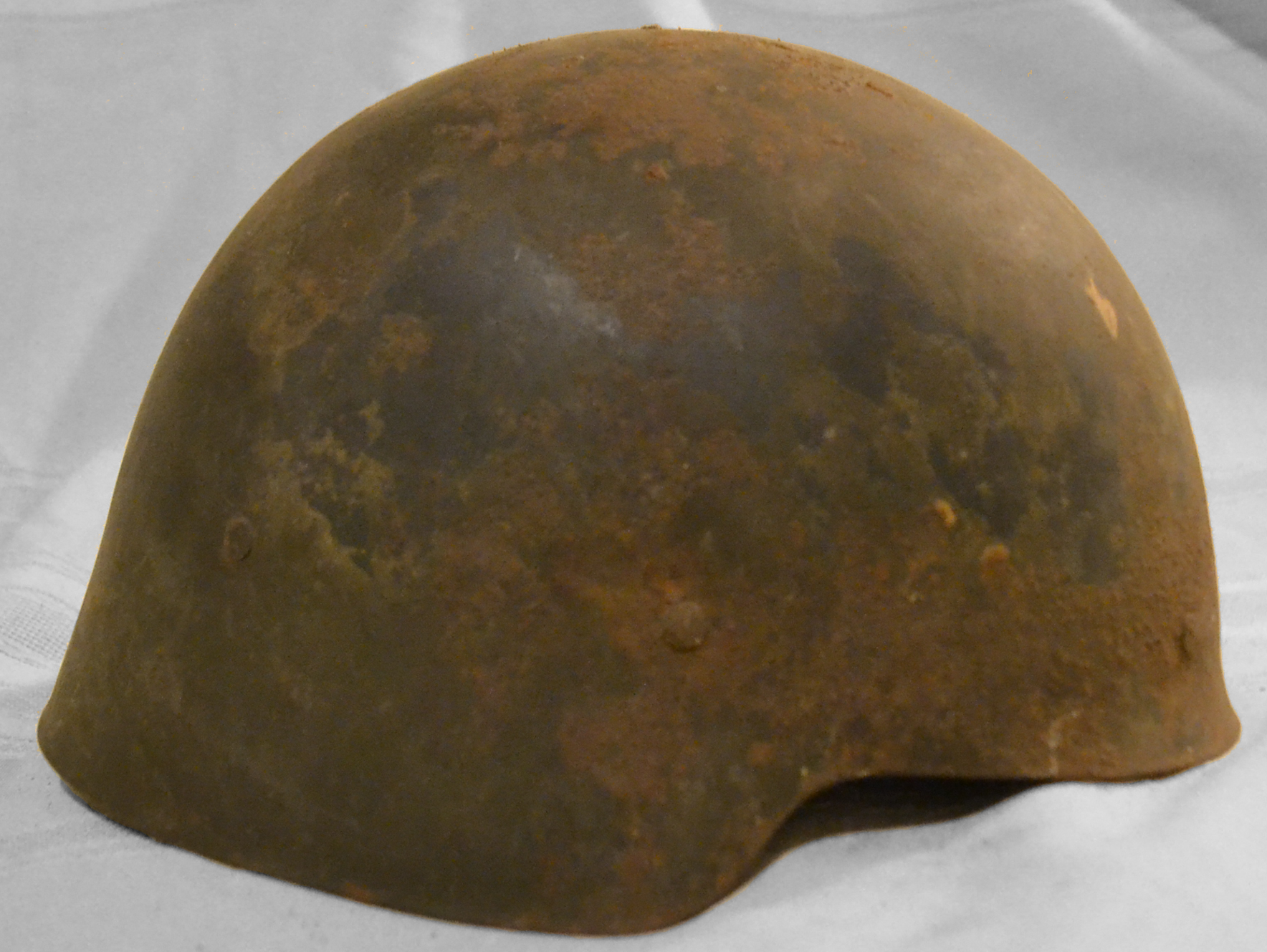
Side view, note the lack of a hollow rivet from pre-Civil War models

The M1921 Helmet, also known as the M21, along with “Sin ala” (“without brim”) for its vertical sides, is a steel combat helmet developed alongside the M1926 helmet in 1926 for use by the Spanish Army. The model was never formally adopted, with the army deciding in favor of the M1926. The exact reasoning for the designation "M1921" is not known as it was developed later.

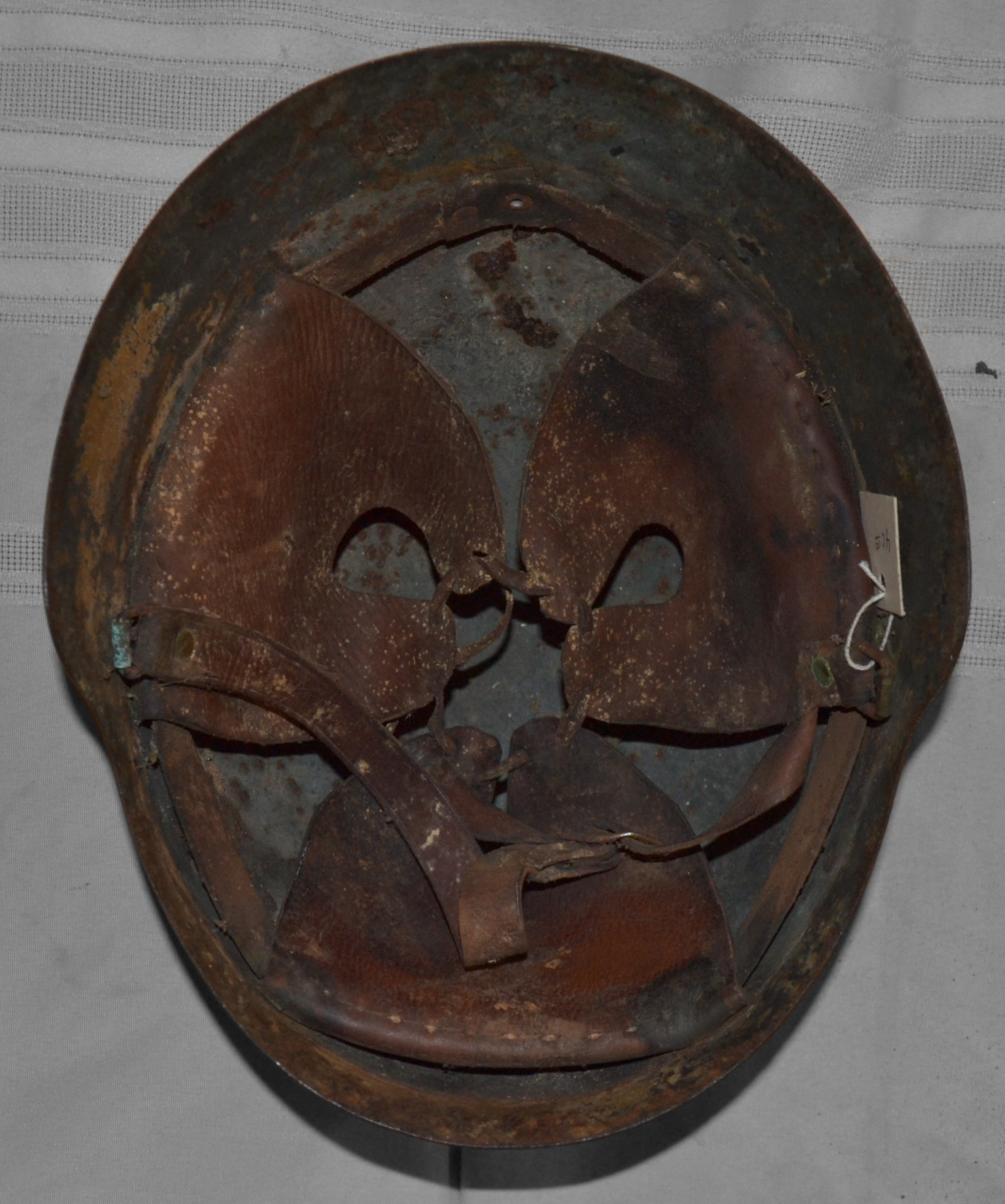
M21 Liner, later used by the M26 and M42 helmets

== Design ==
The first helmet designed by the National Arsenal of Artillery in Trubia. Being produced in 1926 alongside the M1926 but never fully adopted by the Spanish Army in favor of the latter model, with only 12,000 helmets produced. The shell consisting of 1.2mm steel and painted in a grey color before the Spanish Civil War, with many being refurbished alongside the M26 and M34 in 1943 to have the new green paint scheme. The renovations also seeing a bracket welded to the front for the discretionary use of emblems for special occasions such as parades. All helmets of this model refurbished before 1943 featured a hollow rivet for the chin strap to attach to the liner and shell, afterwards having a plain rivet identical to the rest on the shell. The liner being a plain three pads attached to a leather band affixed to the shell by means of seven rivets, with a rudimentary buckle chin strap. Despite the small batch produced, the helmet would see use during the Spanish Civil War with the need for both sides to quickly equip their forces with whatever was available. This model being well sought after by collectors for its rarity, especially in its prewar configuration of grey paint and hollow chin strap rivets.
