= Perlavia =

Perlavia Perlavia (in Asturian)
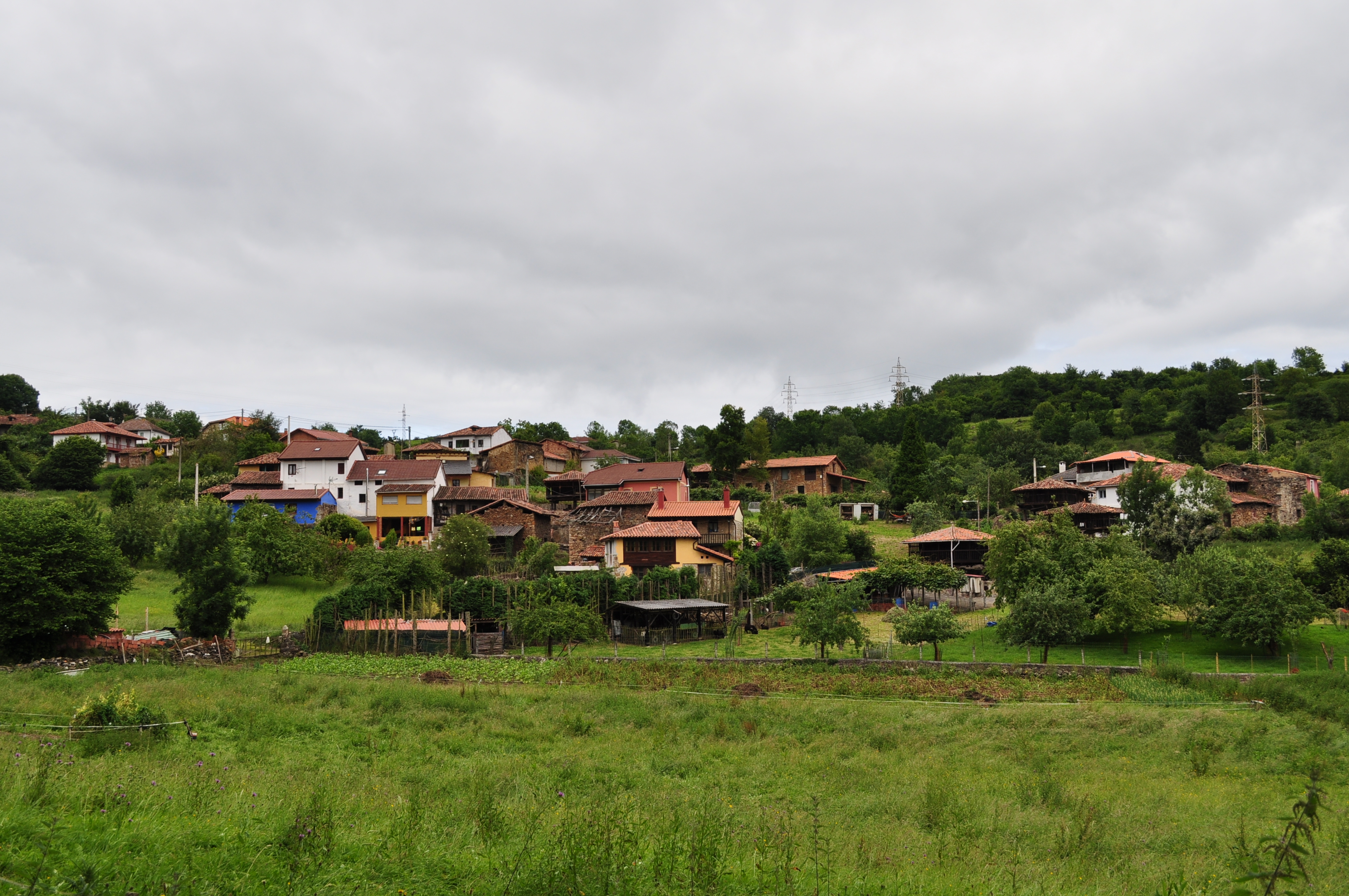

- Location in Asturias Location in Spain
- Coordinates: 43°19′26″N 6°0′11″W
- Country: Spain
- Autonomous community: Principado de Asturias
- Province: Asturias
- Municipality: Oviedo
- Parish: Trubia
- Highest elevation: 410 m (1,350 ft)
- Lowest elevation: 370 m (1,210 ft)

Population (2017)
  - Total: 50
- Time zone: UTC+1 (CET)
  - Summer (DST): UTC+2 (CEST)
- Postal code: 33119

Perlavia is a place in the parish of Trubia, in the municipality of Oviedo, Asturias, Spain. Perlavia is located about 15 km from Oviedo, the capital city of the Principality of Asturias.

== Demographics ==
Year	2000	2001	2002	2003	2004	2005	2006	2007	2008	2009	2010	2011	2012
Population	63	65	57	55	53	51	49	56	58	57	57	58	58

Source: Instituto Nacional de Estadística (Spain)
