= M1942 helmet =

Steel helmet used by Spain from 1942 to 1980s

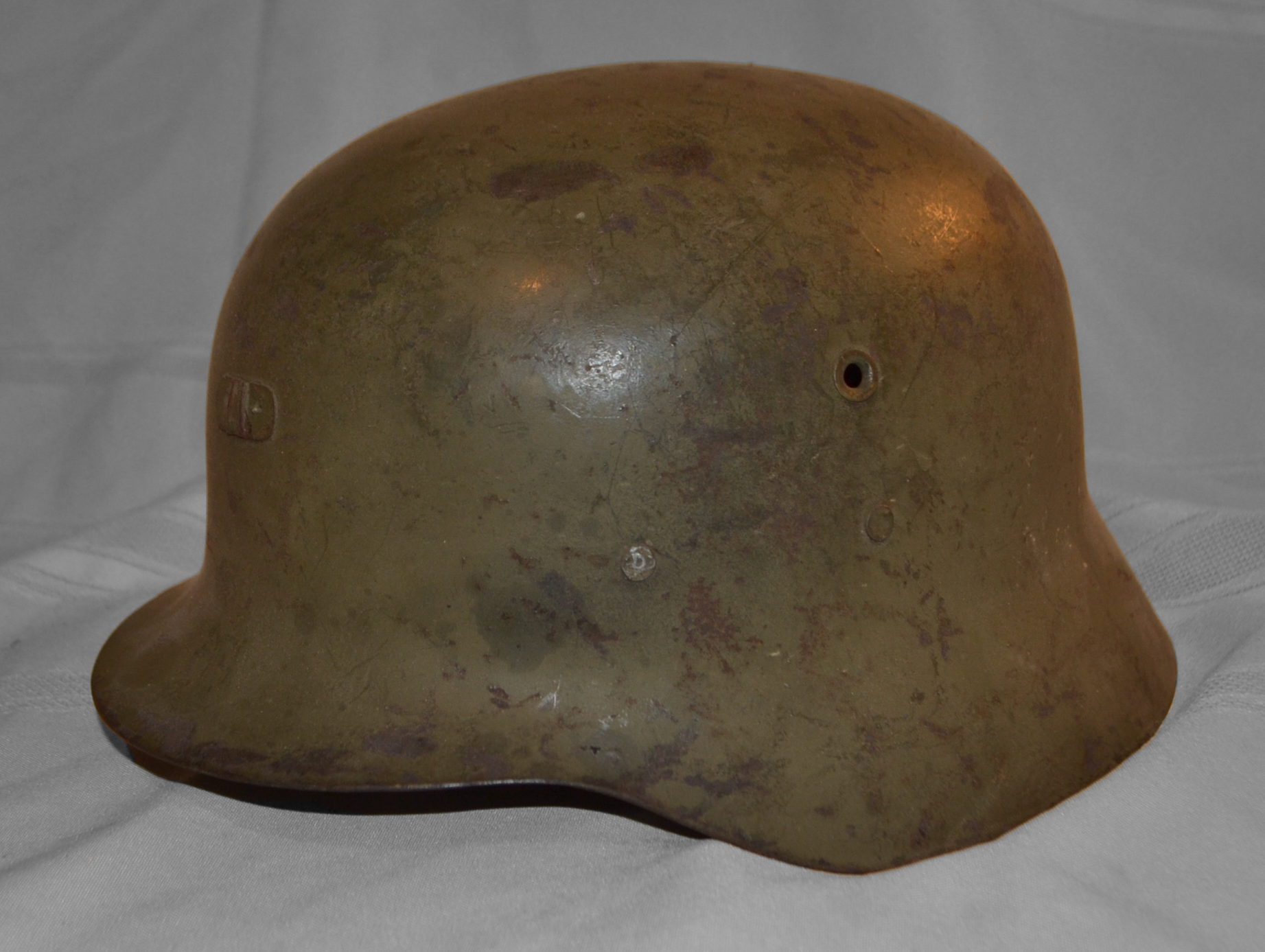
Spanish M42 Helmet, note the bracket on the front for attaching emblems.

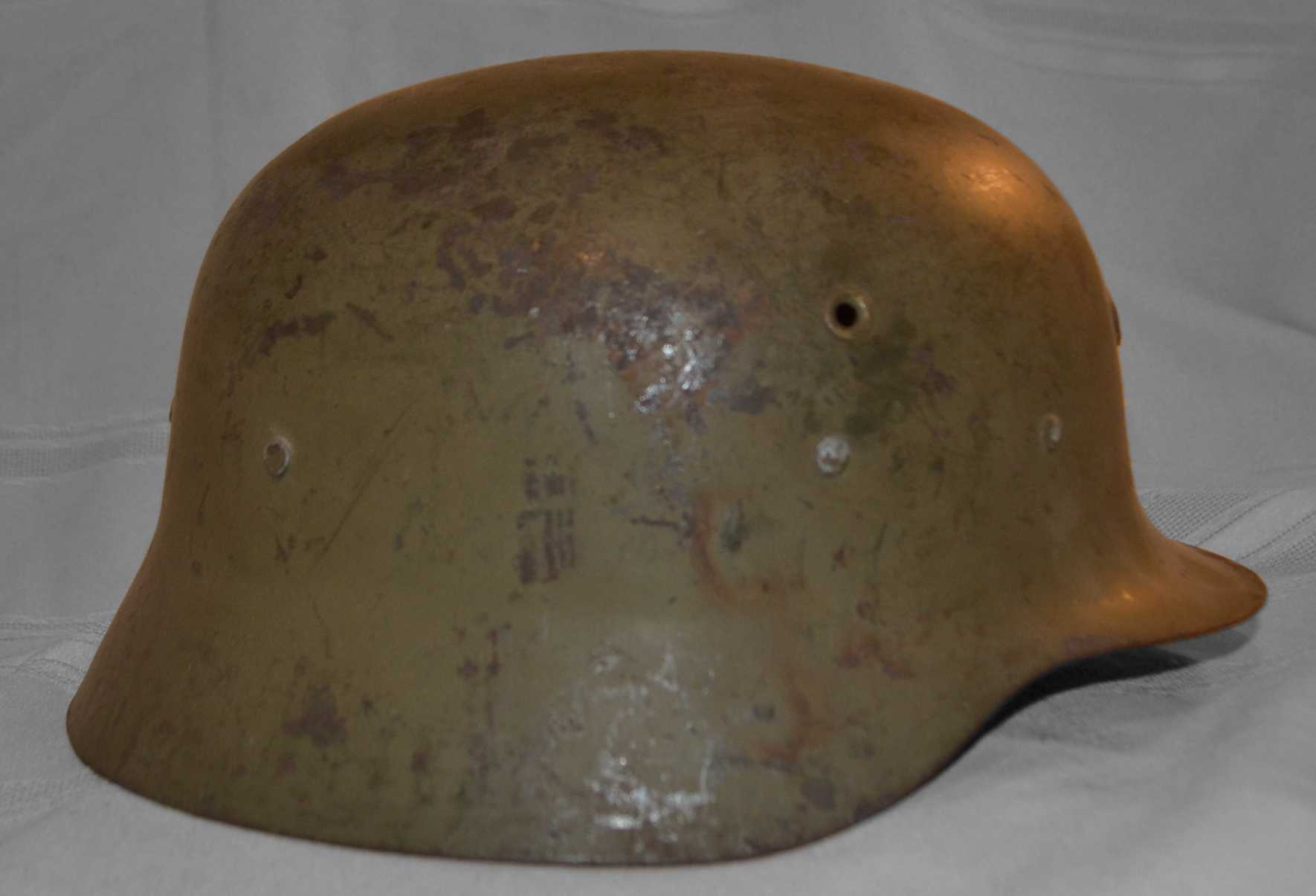
M42 side with its multiple rivets for attaching the liner.

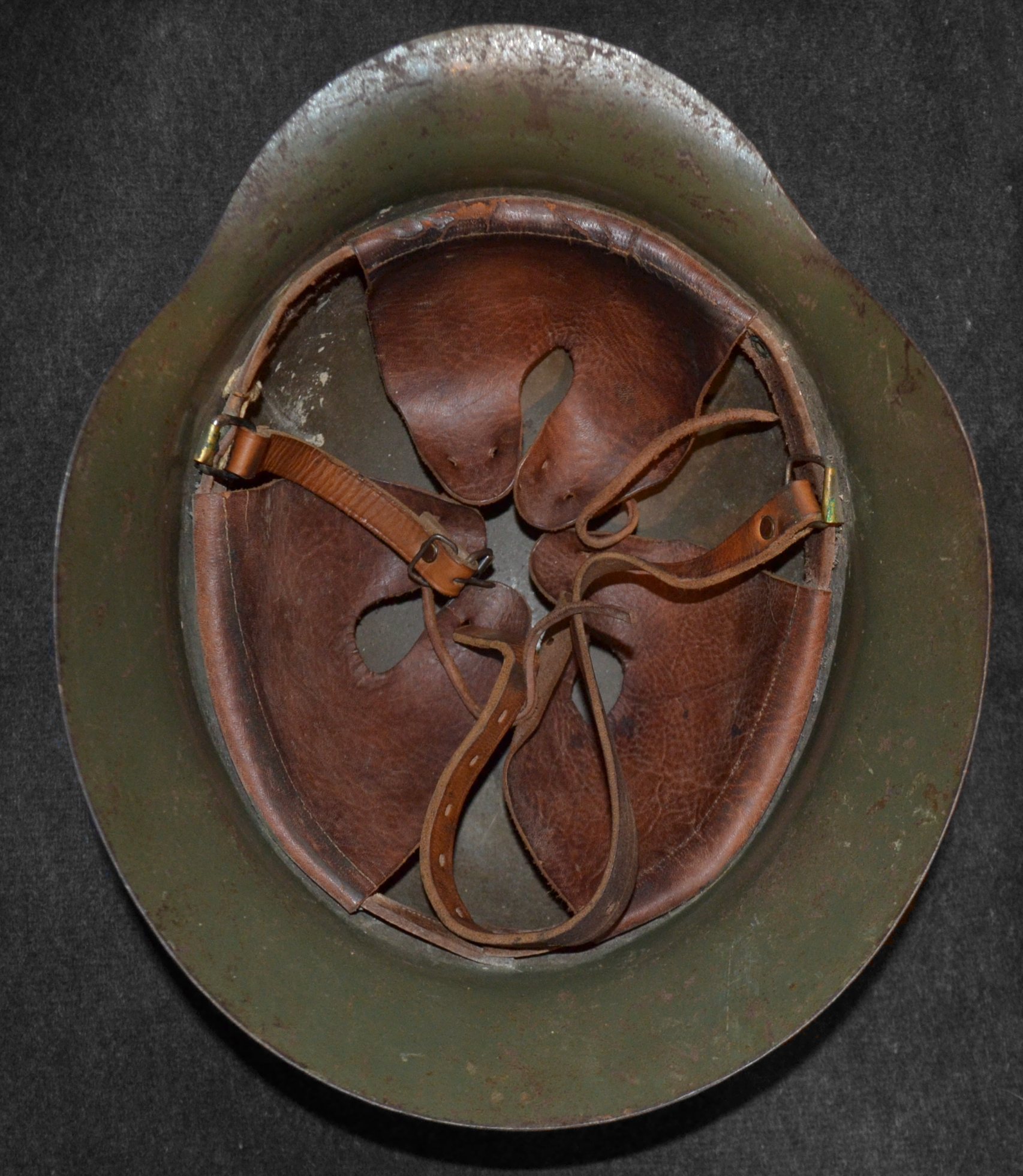
M42 Liner with its simple all leather assembly.

The M1942 helmet (Also known as the “Modelo Z” and simply M42) is a military steel combat helmet used by Spain from its adoption in 1942 to its replacement by a Spanish M1 copy in the 1980s.

== Design ==
Based on the M35 (M40) Stahlhelm used by Nazi Germany, the M42 was of markedly lower quality, made of thinner and lower quality steel. This made it prone to dents and damage. Featuring ventilation holes with stamped rims much like the German M40, and a raw edge like the M42 without the slight flaring characteristic of the German model. The liner was similar to that of the previous M26 and M21 helmets, with three leather pads attached around a leather band around the shell. The liner is attached to the shell by means of seven rivets that include the linking of the two piece chin strap to the shell. The shell was painted a plain green color, and distinctive of Spanish helmets features a bracket on the front for the optional attachment of insignia for parades and other ceremonies. The Spanish Civil Guard used the same model helmet only it was painted grey instead of green and featured its own special emblem to be placed on the bracket when the need arose. Later in its military career the M42 would receive a simple khaki green cover for use by the Army, and later in a reversible cover with camouflage patterns unique to Spain known as “Amoeba.” 1979 would see most M42's modernized with a new liner and chin strap known as the M42/79, the liner being made of a combination of leather and canvas with the chin strap being just canvas.
