= M1926 helmet (Spain) =

Spanish military equipment

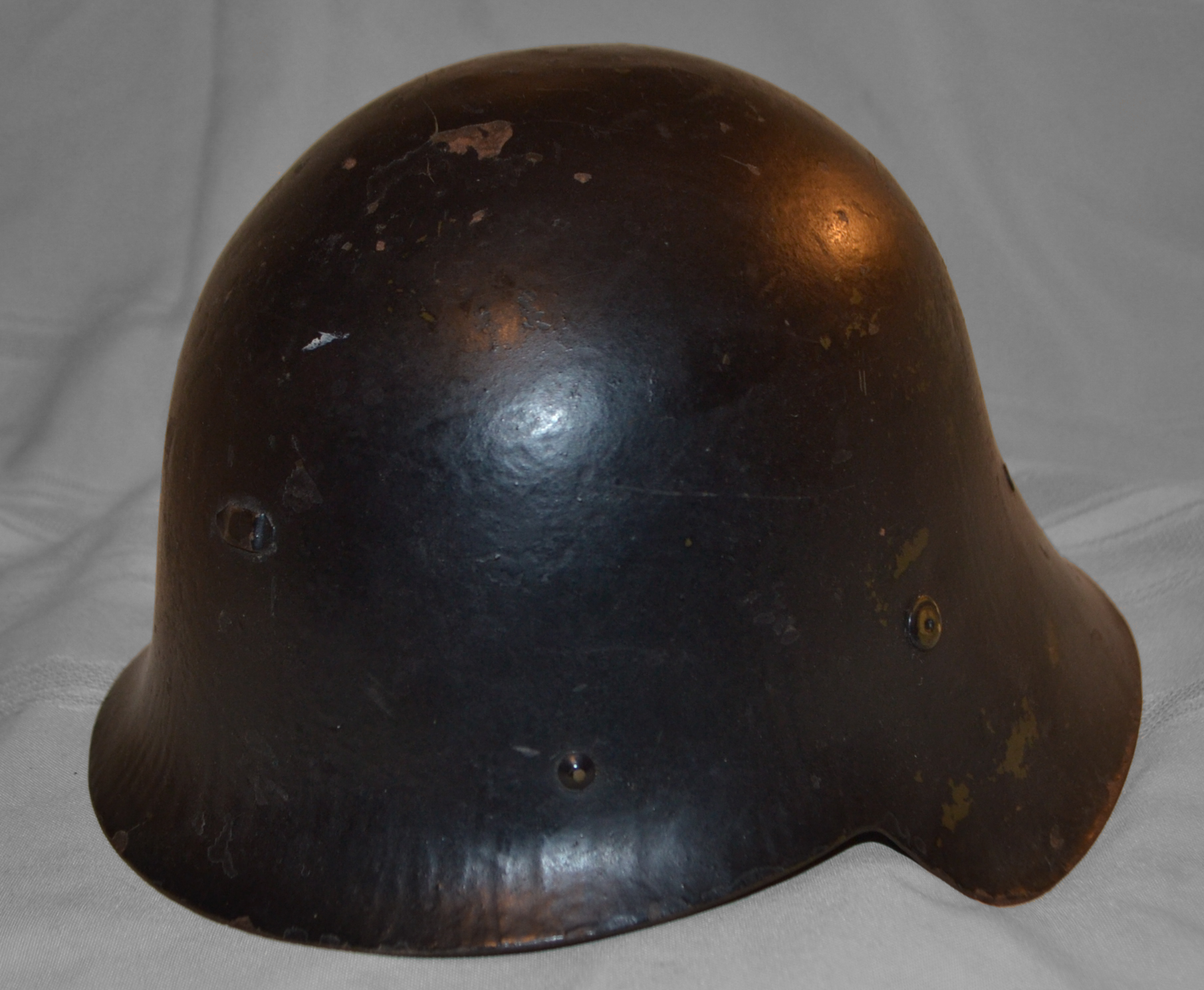
Spanish M26 Helmet, painted black as opposed to its usual pre Civil War grey or Francoist green color.

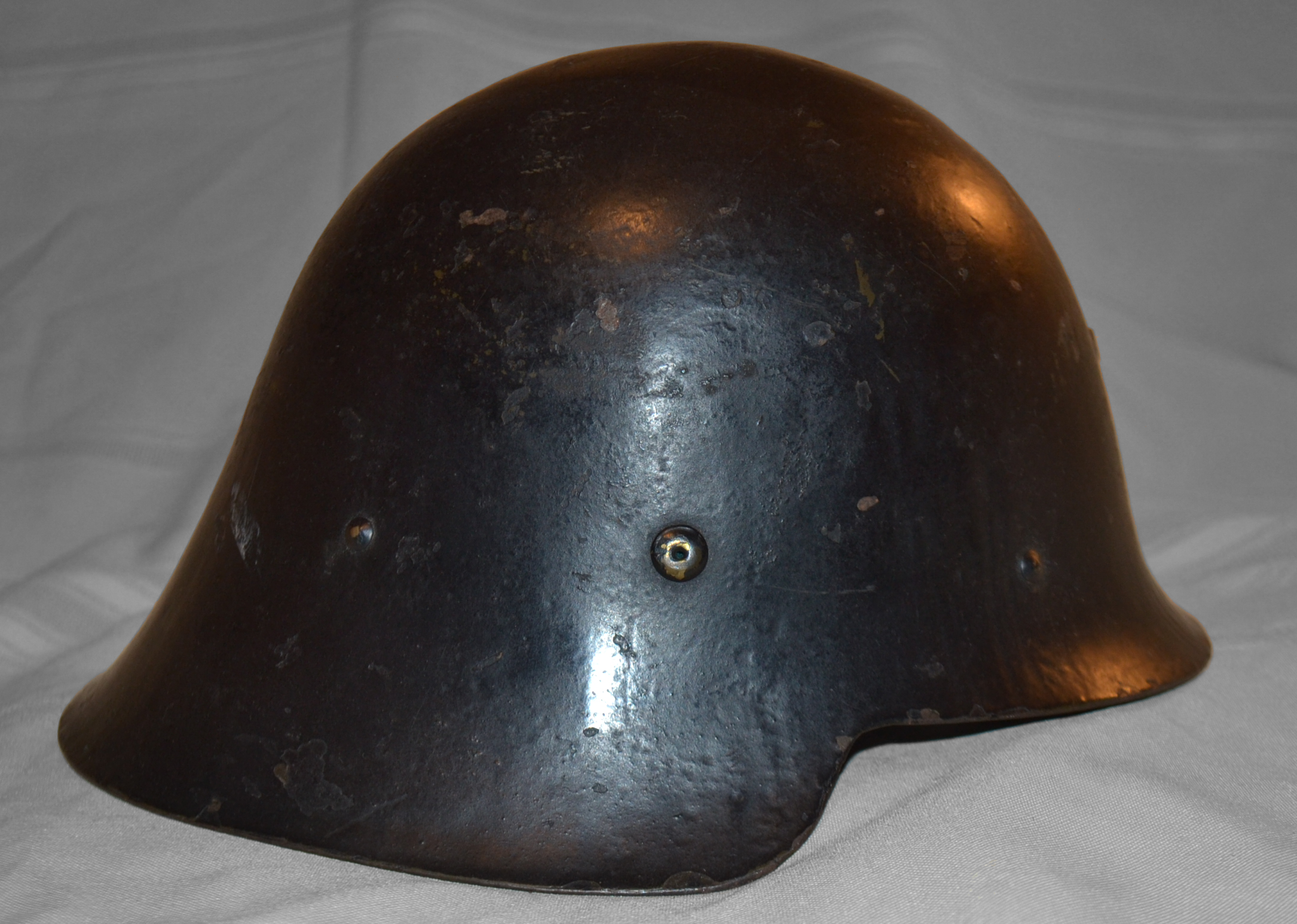
Profile view, note the hollow center rivet characteristic of pre Civil War production helmets of this type.

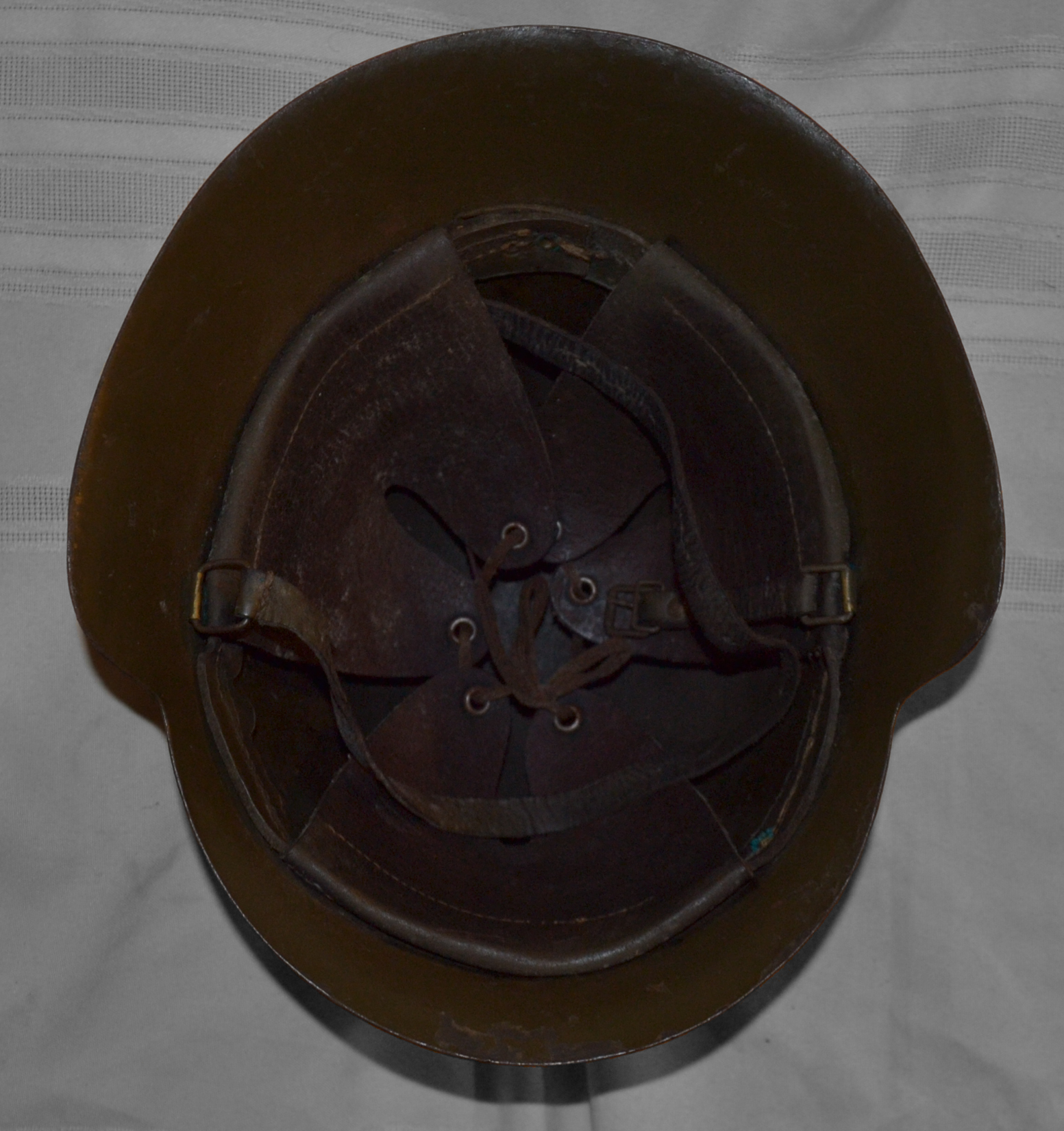
Interior of the helmet showing the three pad liner setup as well as the original hue of green paint.

The M1926 Helmet, also known as the M26 and “Con ala” ("with brim") for its flared sides compared to the earlier M1921 model helmet, is a steel combat helmet used by Spain from its adoption in 1930 until its replacement by the M42 in 1942. The helmet would be a common sight along with many other helmets between both sides in the Spanish Civil War.

== Design ==
An evolution of the Model 1921 “sin ala” (“without brim") helmet. The shell had a more pronounced flare along the rim (hence the nickname), while still maintaining the liner and chin strap from the previous model. Being the second helmet created by the National Arsenal of Artillery at Trubia for the Spanish Army. Pre Civil War models featured grey paint and hollow chin strap rivets, where in 1943 all Spanish helmets were refurbished with new liners and a green paint job. With this new liner the hollow chin strap rivets would be replaced with regular domed rivets and a bracket for special insignia to be placed on the front. The helmet would be seen in sporadic use in the Spanish Army until the 1950s with its complete replacement by the M42.
