= Hjälm m/26 =

Swedish combat helmet

hjälm m/37
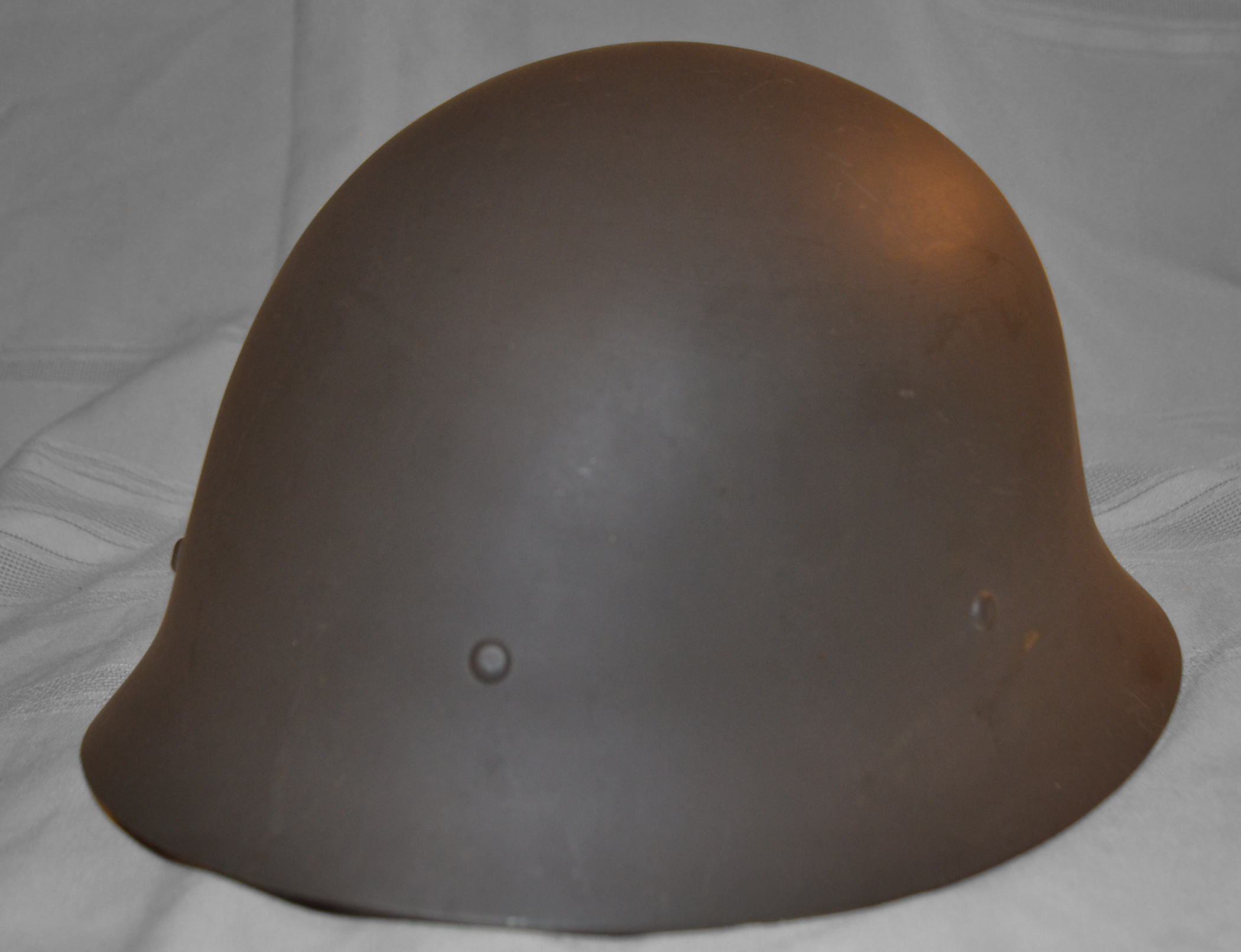
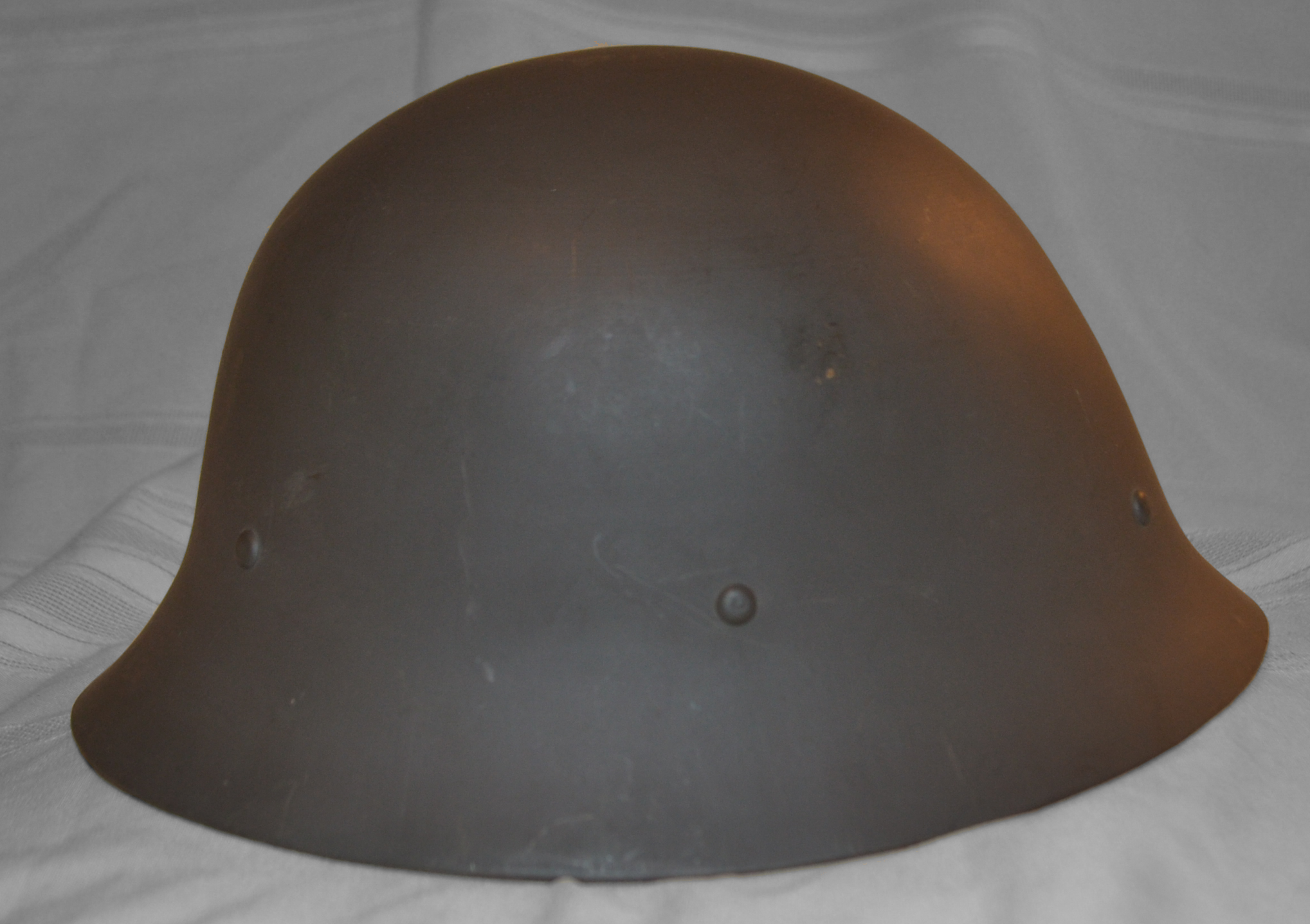
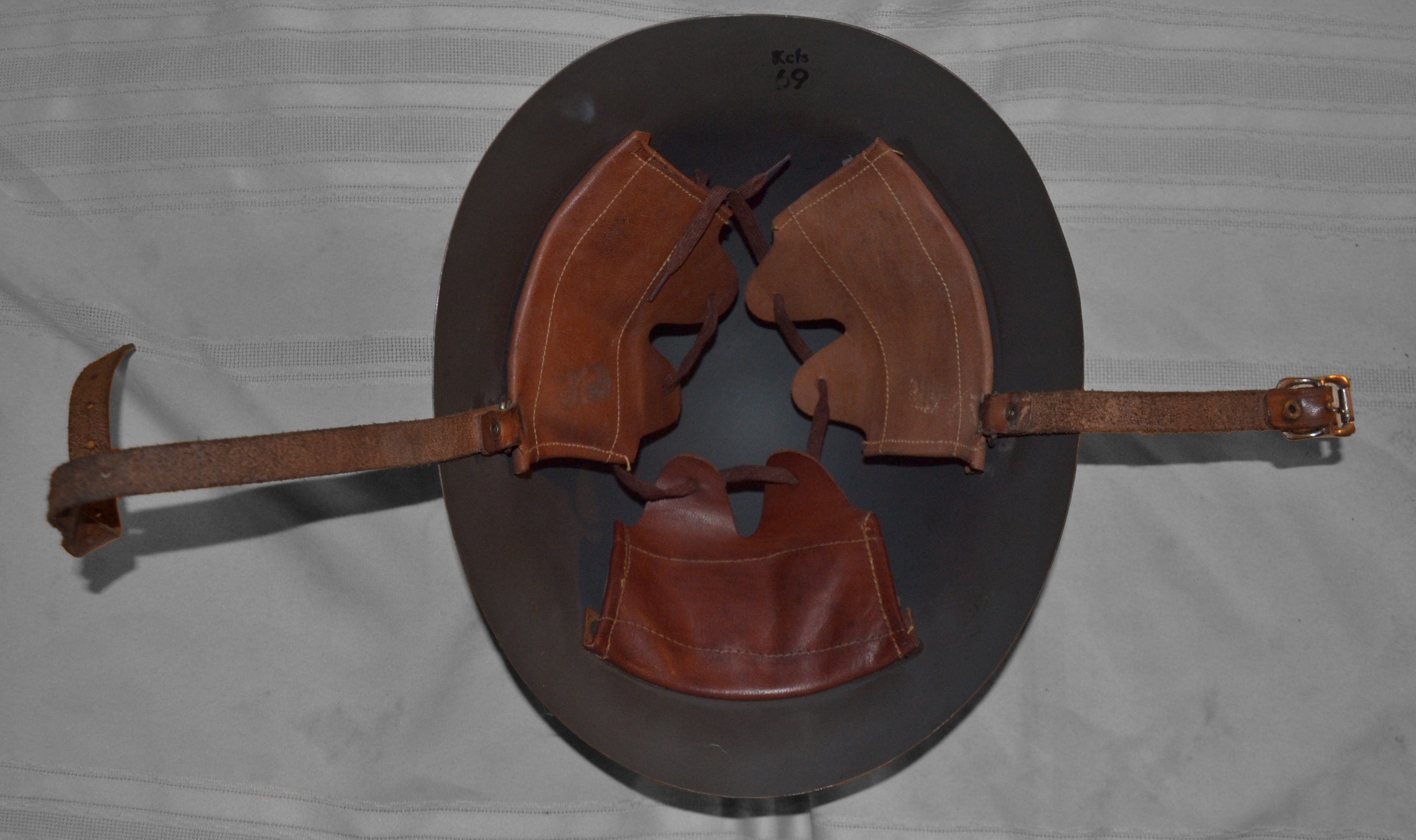
The Swedish m/26 helmet from different directions. Note the m/26 liner, which omits the liner band from the previous m/21 model.

Hjälm m/26 (Swedish for "helmet model 1926") is a Swedish military steel helmet which was used by the Swedish armed forces from the late 1920s to the mid Cold War. It superseded the m/21 helmet design by simplifying elements for easier production, and was itself superseded by the m/37 helmet design which simplified production even further.

== Service ==
Like its predecessor, the m/21 helmet, the m/26 helmet was produced in limited numbers and would come to serve alongside it, later also alongside its successor, the m/37 helmet, before eventually being taken out of service in the later 1900s. It was primariy used in secondary roles for after being formally replaced by the m/37 helmet design.

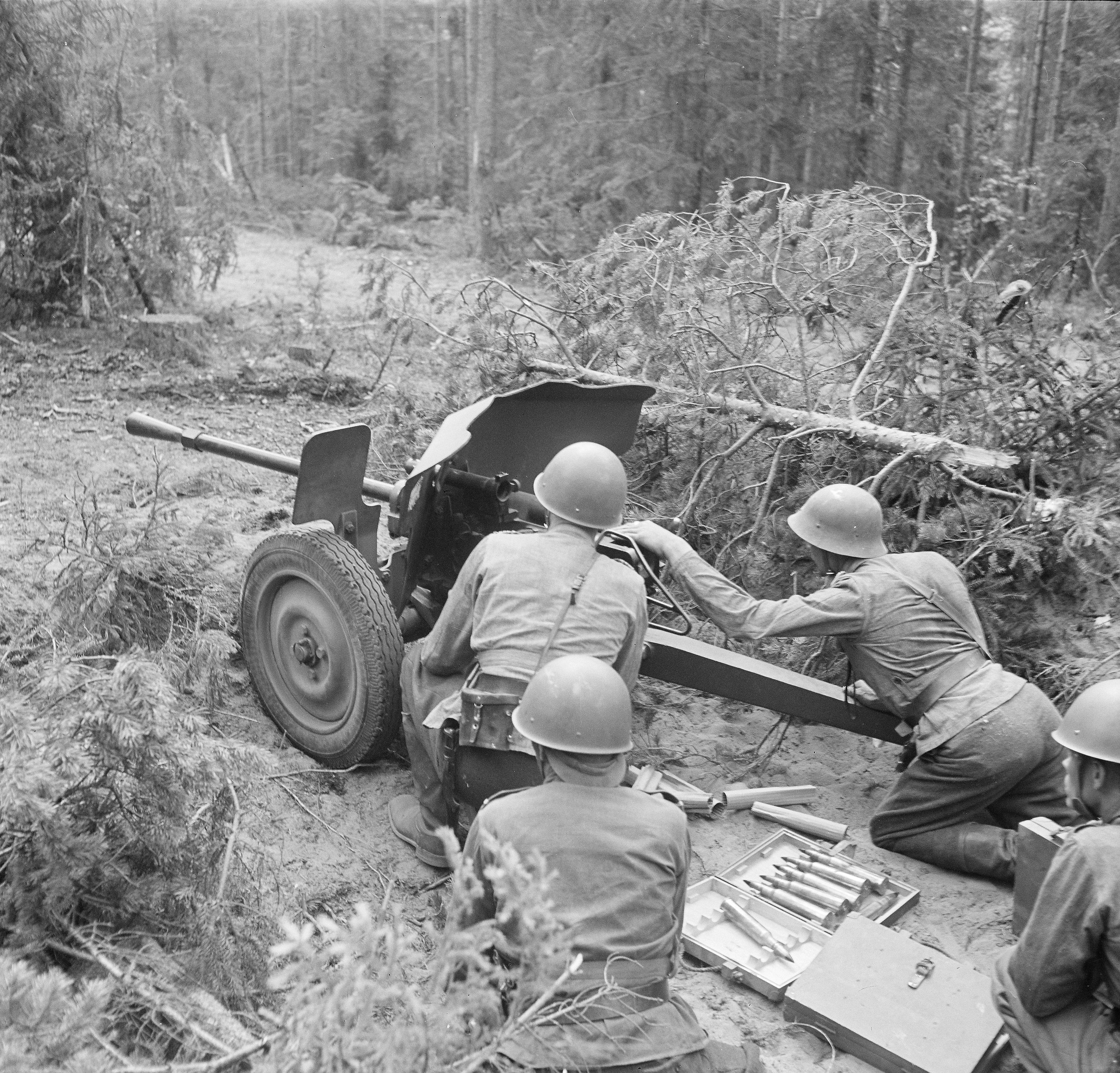
Finnish soldiers wearing Swedish m/37 and m/26 helmets (note the loader)

They would provide Norway with a helmet identical to the m/26, called the m/31. It would be used during the Norwegian Campaign of World War II. The m/26 was also delivered to the Norge Police with base in Sweden. It was also given in limited number to Finland as war aid during the Winter War.

== Design ==
Compared to its previous iteration, the m/26 shares the same basic shape but is simplified through the omission of the press-formed crested ridge on the top of the shell, the press-formed Three Crowns coat of arms on the front face of the helmet, the rolled edge, and the metal band that attaches the liner to the shell. The liner was the same as on the m/21 but attached straight to the shell instead of on a separate band.
