= Hjälm m/37 =

Swedish combat helmet

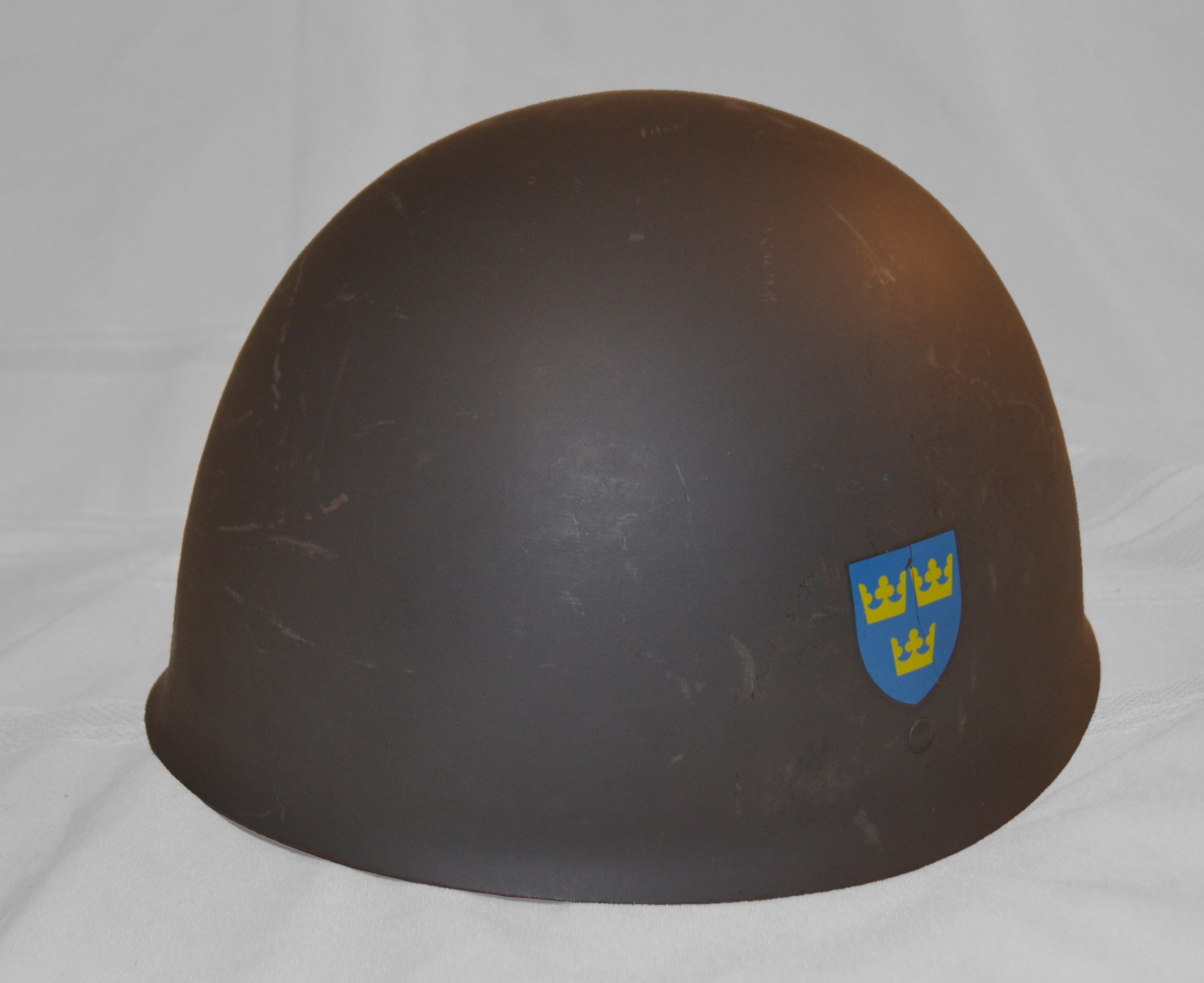
Swedish m/37 helmet from the side, showing the 1942 "Three Crowns" decal applied on both sides.

Hjälm m/37 (Swedish for "helmet model 1937") is a Swedish military steel helmet which was used by the Swedish armed forces from the late 1930s to the early 2000s.

== Service ==
The Swedish m/37 helmet was introduced in the wake of World War II from a 1936 decision to rearm the Swedish military. It was intended to supplemented the earlier m/21 and m/26 helmets which had been only produced in limited numbers and where more expencive to produce. The m/37 helmet was a simpler design, suitable for mass production, lacking the rounded brim of the previous designs.

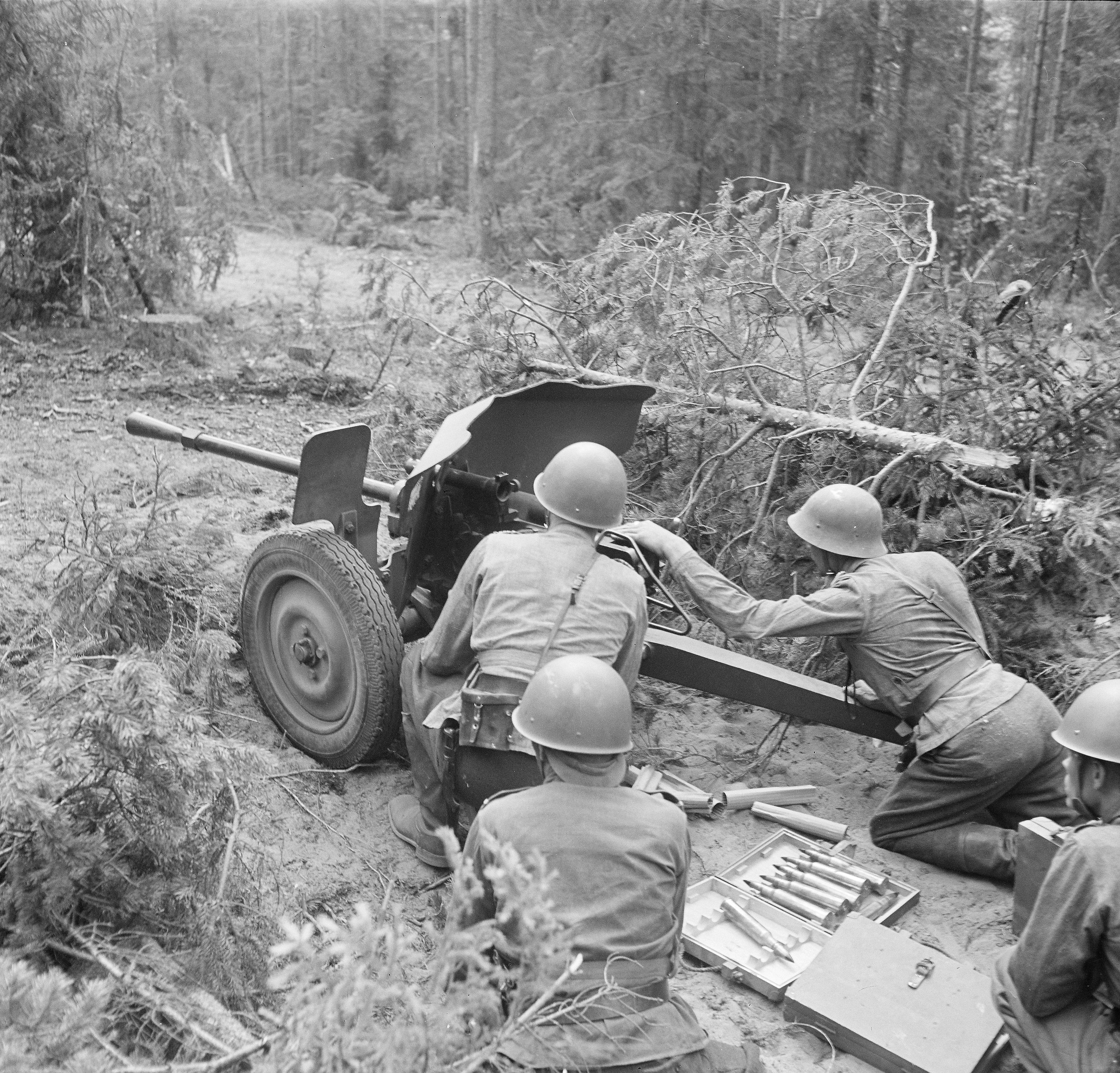
Finnish soldiers wearing Swedish m/37 and m/26 helmets

The m/37 helmet was produced in much greater numbers than its predecessors, and even given to Finland as war aid during the Winter War (along with m/26 helmets). Finland produced a copy of the m/37 known as the m/40 at the Wartsila Oy and Kone-ja Silta plants. The main difference between the Finnish production helmets being the M40 was made of slightly heavier materials for the shell and painted in a green color as opposed to the Swedish grey.

The m/37 helmet would be used until the 1990s, when it started being replaced by the new m/90 kevlar helmet periodically through the 1990s, finally being retired in the early 2000s.

== Design ==
The helmet features a shell design distinct from its predecessors, being more hemispherical in its appearance with a simplified shape, lacking the rounded brim of the previous designs. It shared the same liner as its former designs, featuring a three pad liner attached directly to the shell like the m/26 helmet, along with a simple buckle chinstrap.

The original liner was not stable during movement, and soldiers would often remove their helmets when they could. It was a three pad liner system, like the m/21 and m/26 before it. The helmet would be updated with a modernized liner in 1965 which made the helmets more stable during movement, being attached to the top of the shell by only a single rivet made up of a canvas webbing and sheet metal attached to a leather sweatband, as well as introducing a canvas chinstrap with a quick-release system. The model with the modernized liner being commonly known as the "m/37-65 helmet" (hjälm m/37-65). The Finnish m/40s also received a modernized liner nearly identical to the m/37-65 around the same time. The helmets where later again updated to feature a resizeable headband.

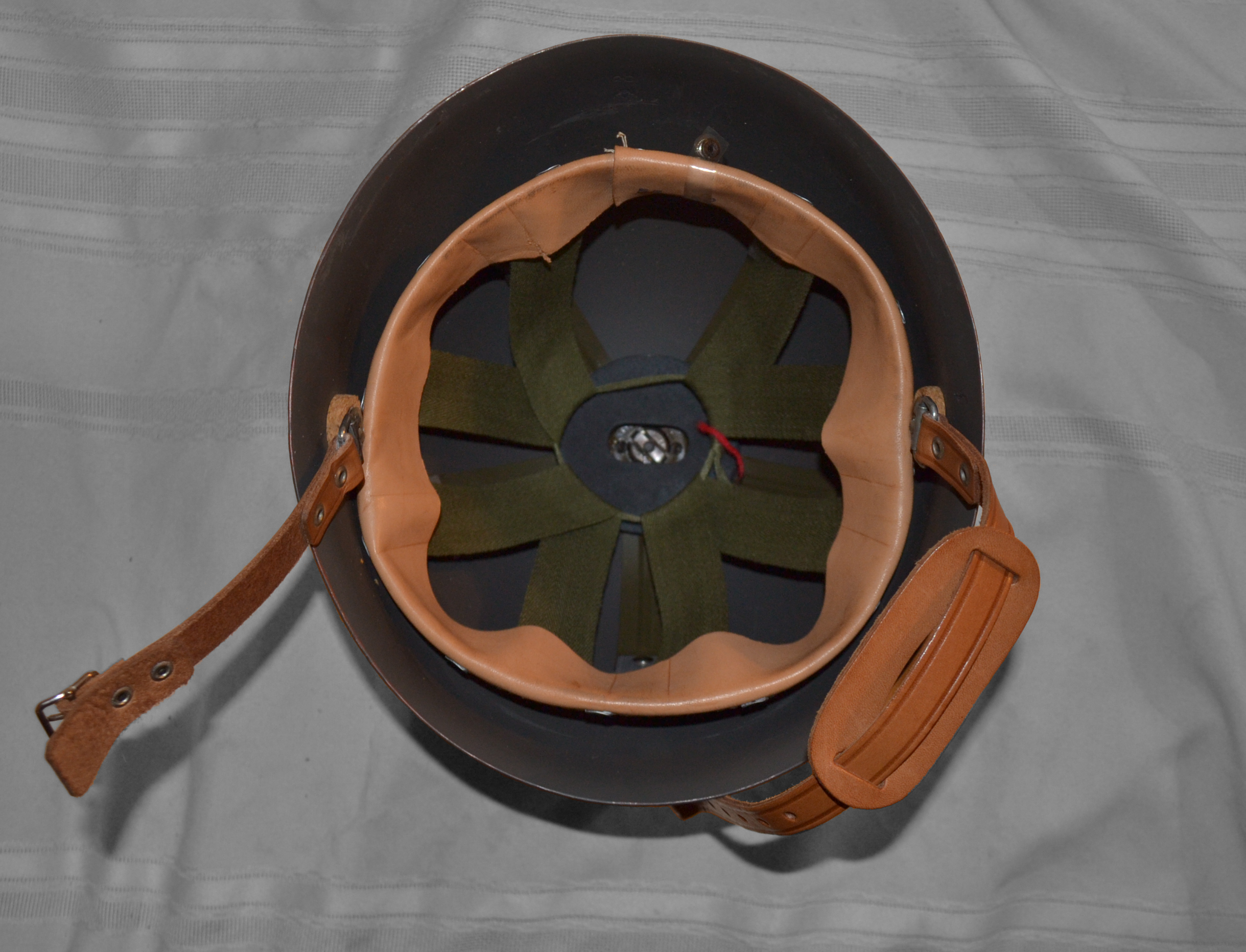
Helmet m/37-65 but old chinstrap

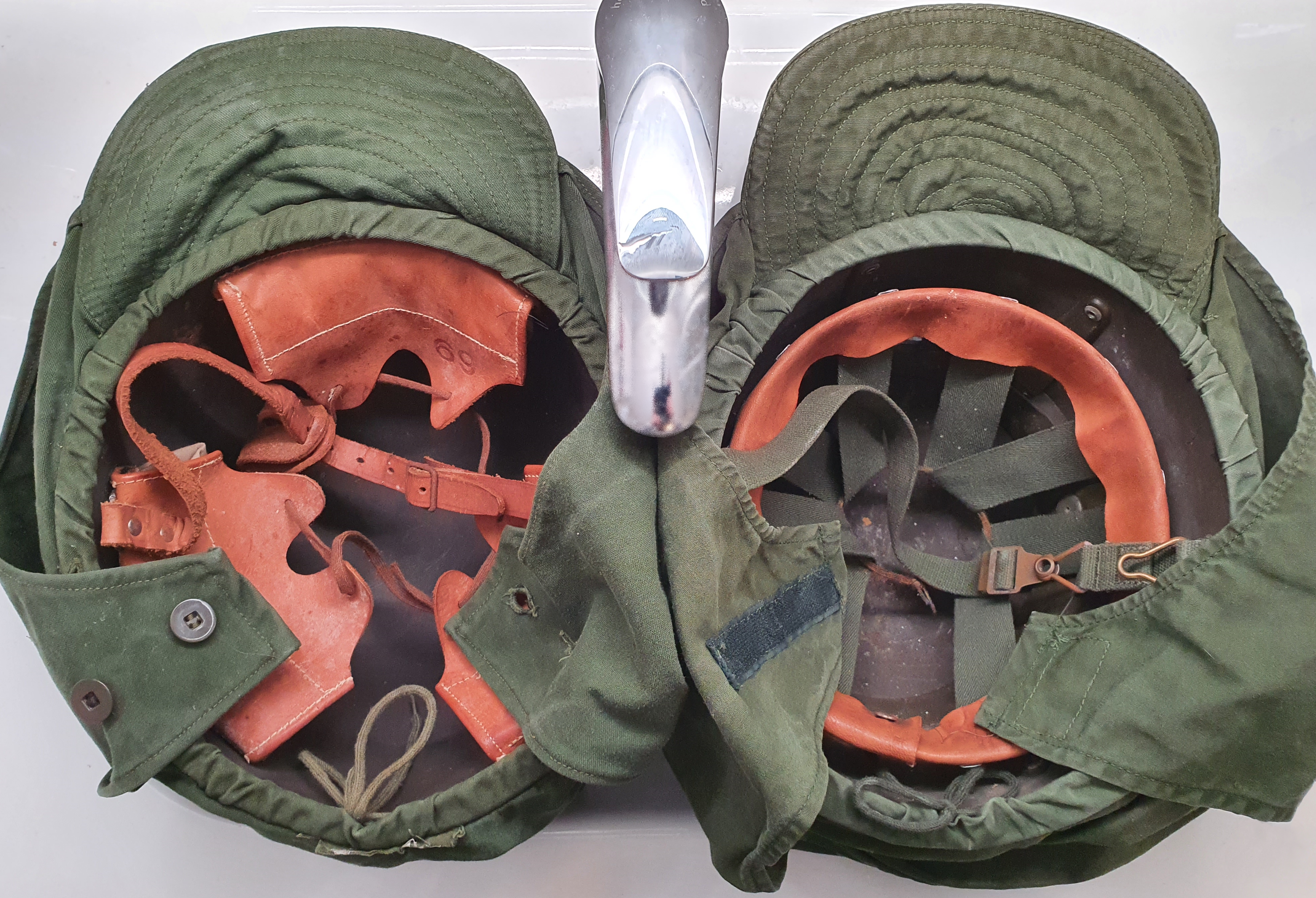
Helmet m/37 (left) vs m/37-65 (right) with earlier and later m/59 cover

== Camouflage ==
The standard color throughoout the helmets service life was grey. Camouflage varried and was most often temporary installations of colored cloth, albeit a massproducted wire installation for mounting greenery and thereof also existed, simply called "masking wire" (maskeringstråd).

Later, US helmet netting was bought as WWII surplus, called "helmet net m/51" (hjälmnät m/51), and later on, a standard indigenous helmet hood with netting was produced, called "helmet wimple m/59" (hjälmdok m/59), featuring the same green color as the m/59 field uniform. The cover has a simple drawstring design where the chin straps would loop through the cover to keep it in place, and a drawstring on top of the cover to size it to the shell. Fold-down flaps which covered additional areas of the head and a sun brim were additional components provided. It was designed to function with a gas mask and seal against CBRN weapons to some degree.

In the 1990s, a modern helmet camouflage net from Saab Barracuda was bought in limited numbers for the transition period of switching over to the m/90 kevlar helmet.

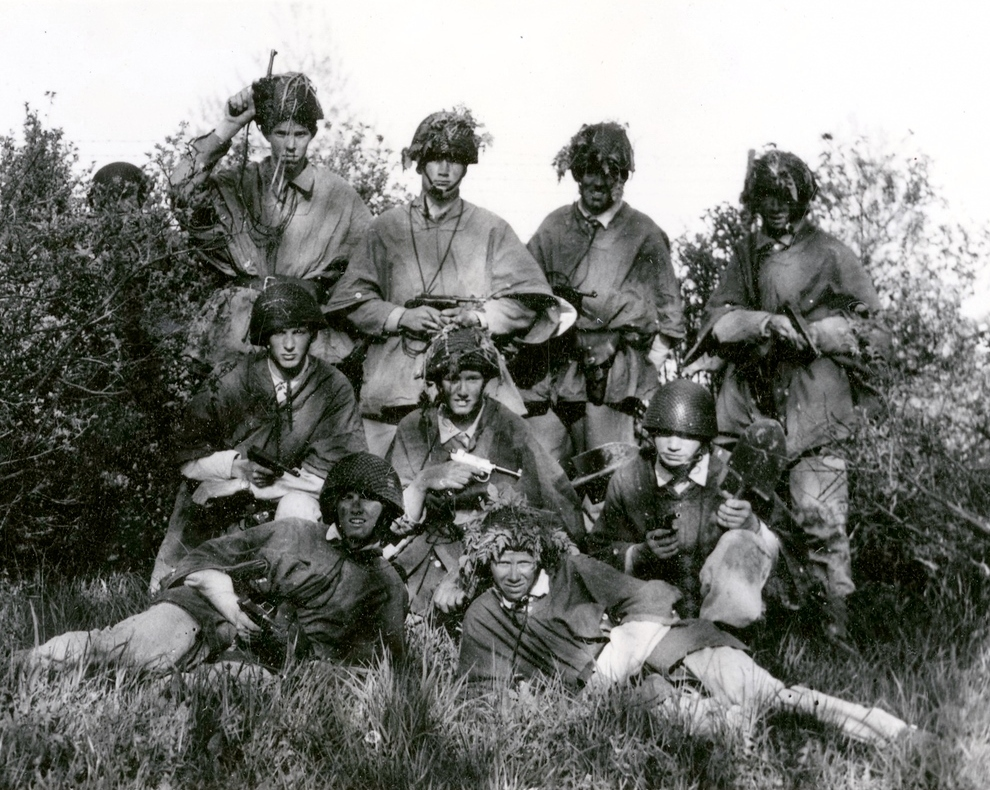
Soldiers with "helmet net m/51" (1956–1957)

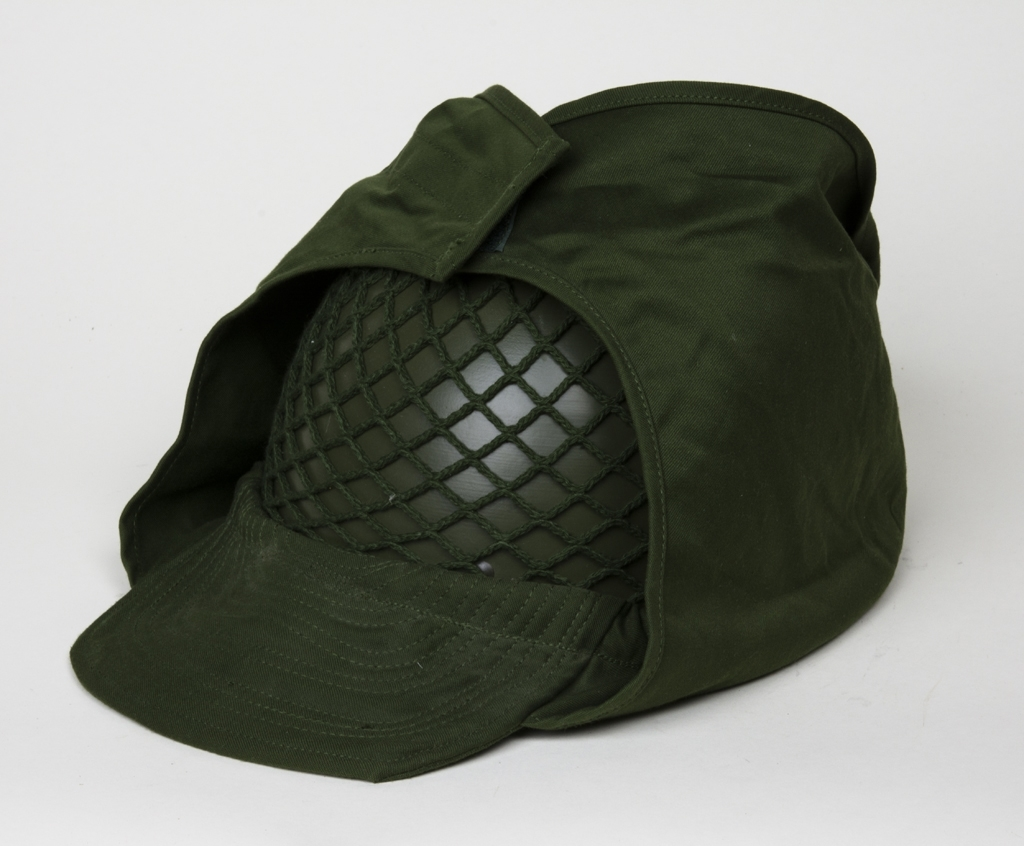
Helmet m/37 with "helmet wimple m/59".

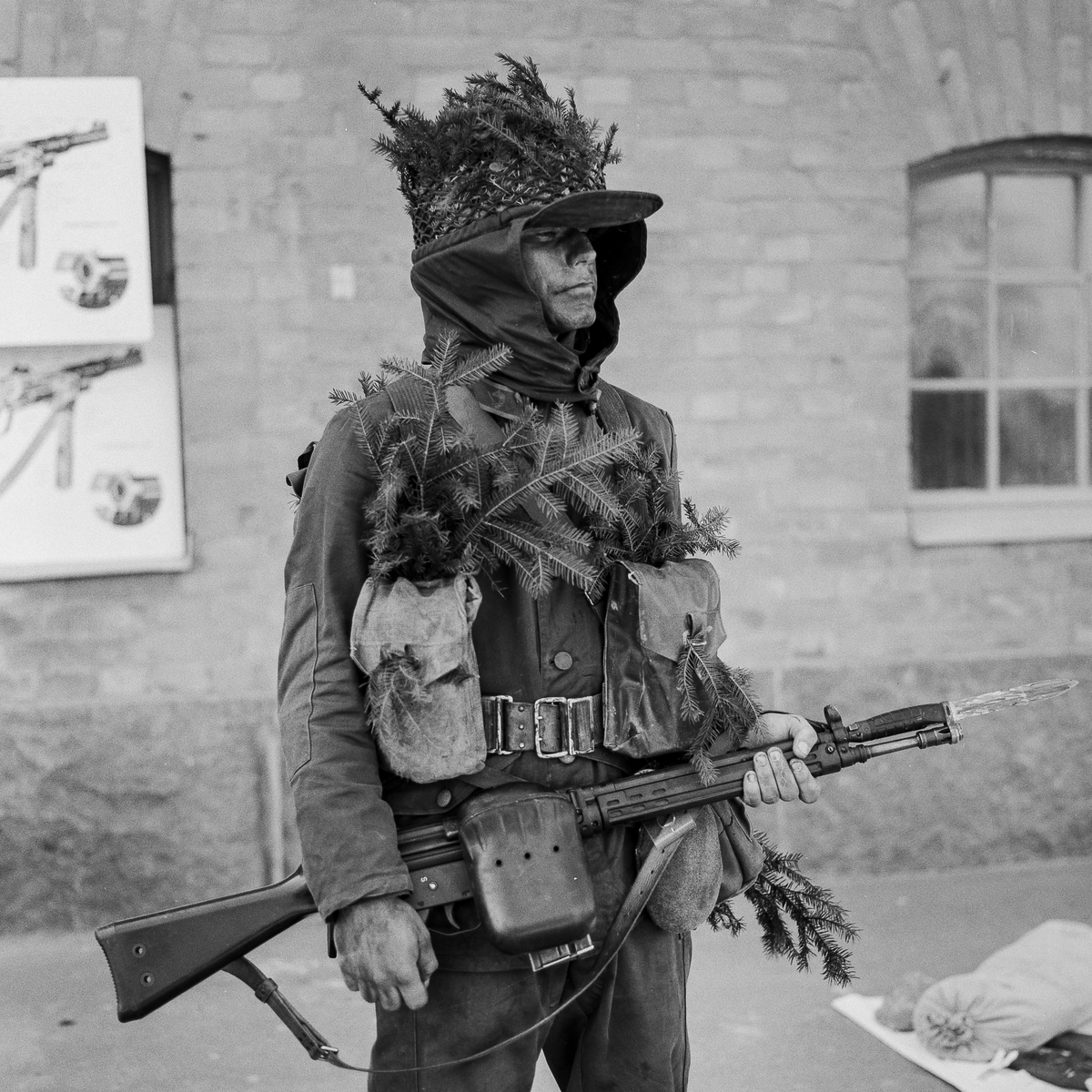
Camouflaged soldier in full m/59 gear

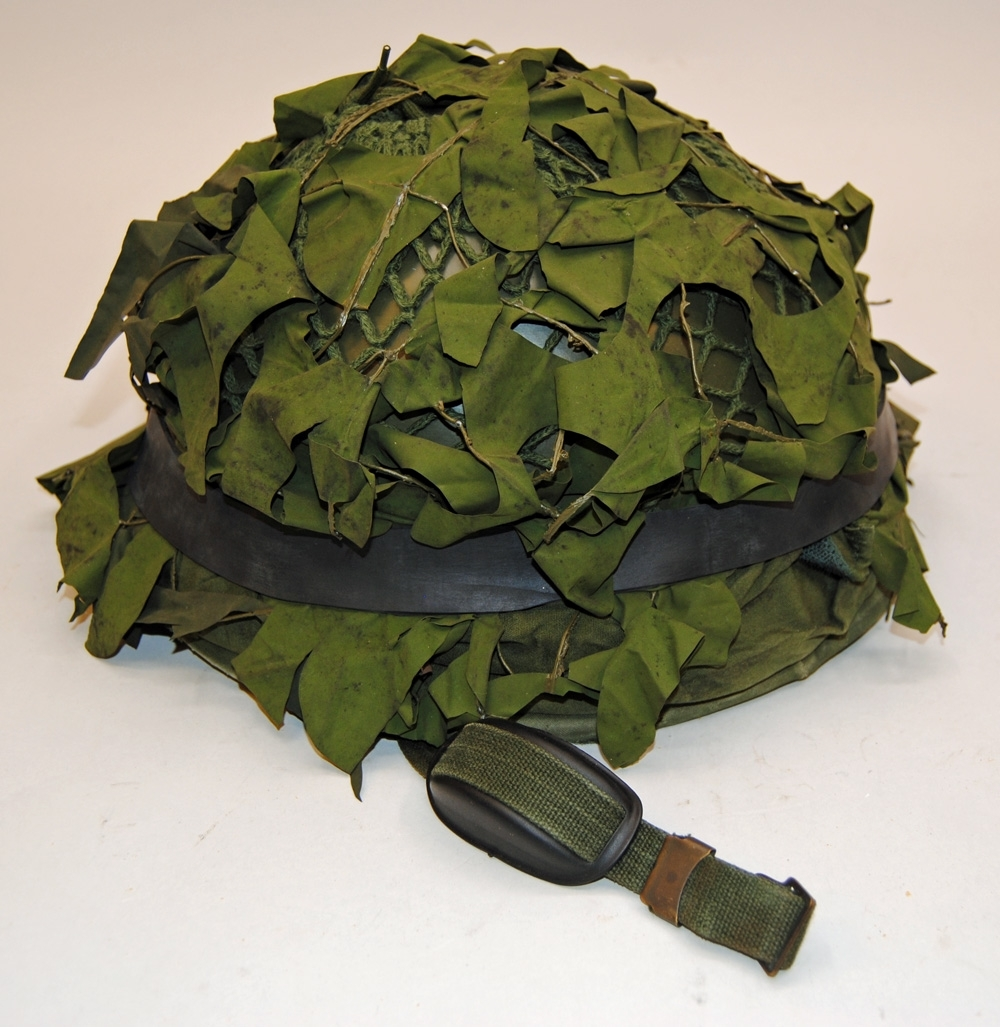
Helmet m/37 with Saab Barracuda helmet net (1990s)
