= Trubia =

Coordinates: 43°19′58″N 5°59′16″W

- Parish
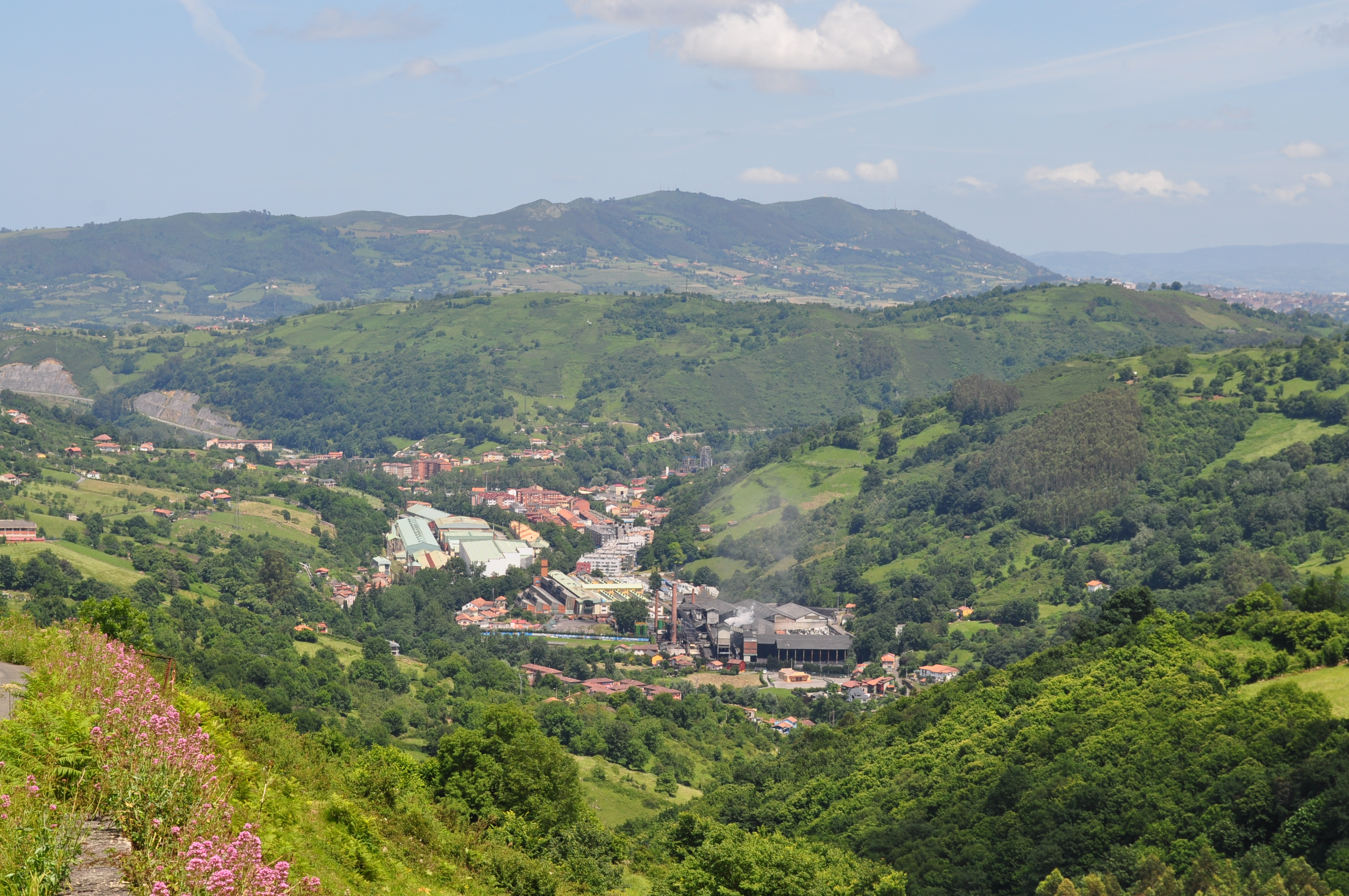
- Interactive map of Trubia
- Country: Spain
- Autonomous community: Asturias
- Comarca: Oviedo
- Municipality: Oviedo

Area
  - Total: 14.59 km^{2} (5.63 sq mi)
- Elevation: 100 m (330 ft)

Population (2014)
  - Total: 1,996
  - Density: 136.8/km^{2} (354.3/sq mi)

Trubia is a parish of the municipality of Oviedo, Asturias, Spain.

It is located in the confluence of rivers Nalón and Trubia, giving the last one its name to the location.

== History ==
In the 19th century, the Royal Weapons Factory of Trubia was established and resulted in a significant increase in the population of the parish. This factory is still in use today.

In 1885, as Pintoria and Udrión, Trubia left the municipality of Grado and was annexed to Oviedo.
