= SSh-60 =

Combat helmet by the Soviet Union

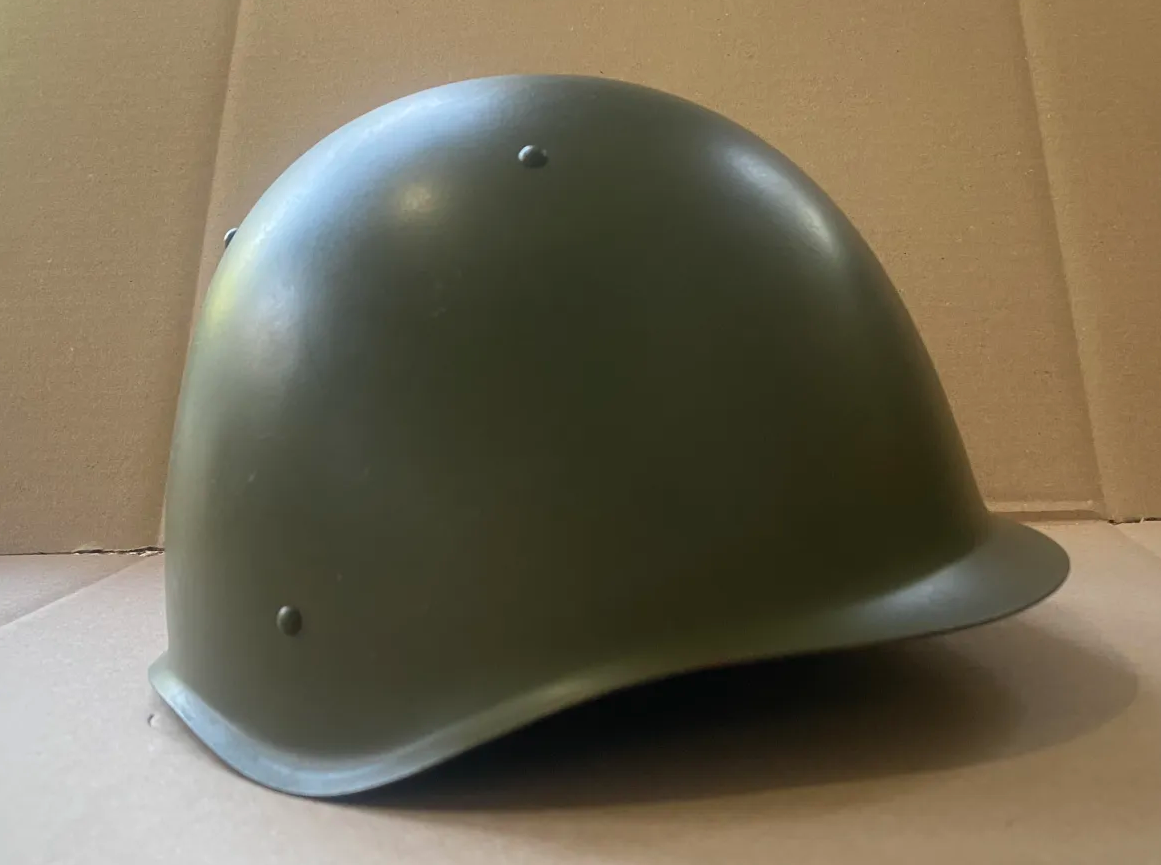
- SSh-60 helmet
- Type: Combat Helmet
- Place of origin: Soviet Union

Service history
- In service: 1960–present
- Used by: See Users
- Wars: Vietnam War; Yom Kippur War; Sino-Vietnamese War; Soviet–Afghan War; Iran–Iraq War; Donbass war; Russo-Ukrainian War

Production history
- Produced: 1960–1973

Specifications
- Weight: 1.3 kg (2.9 lb)

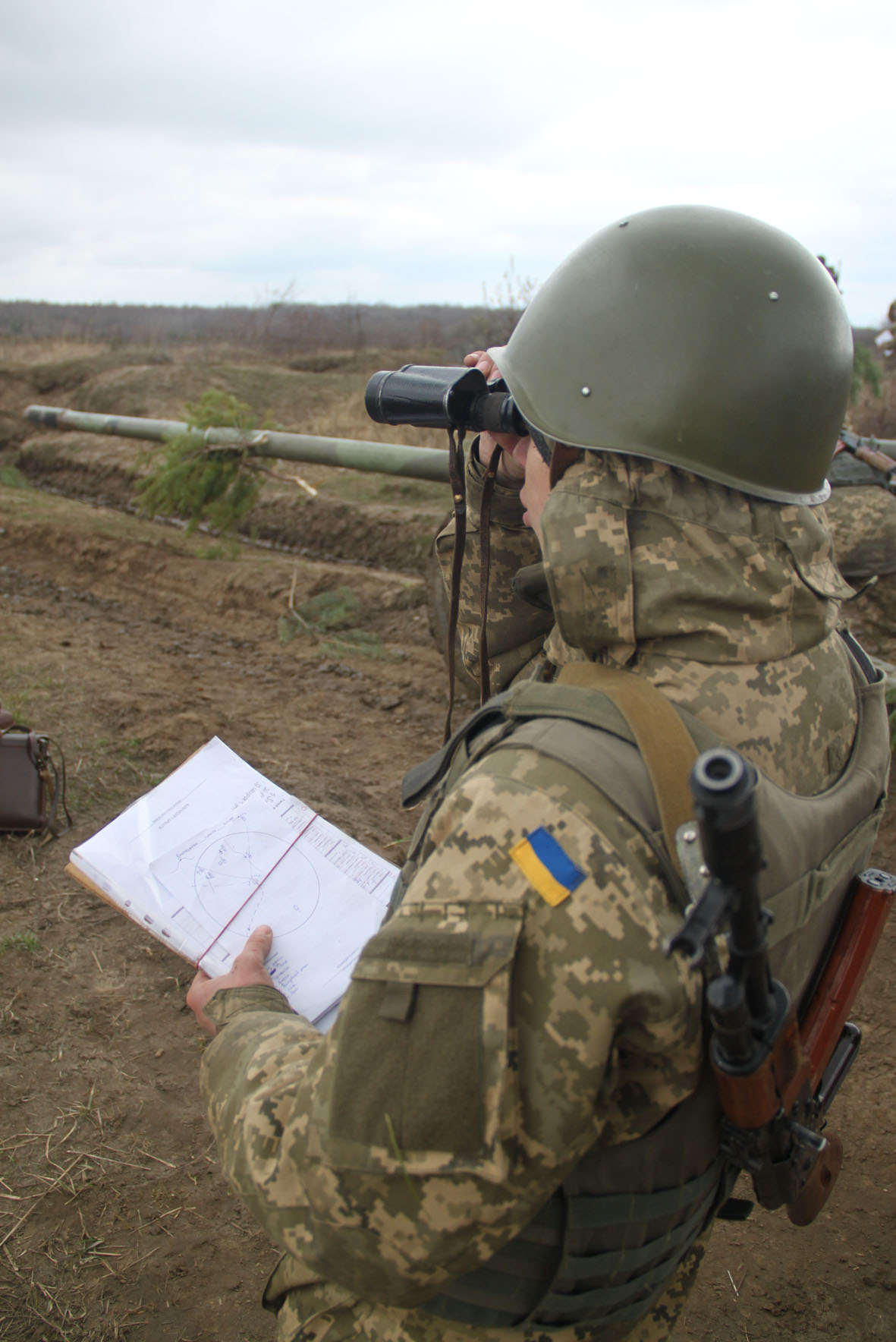
A Ukrainian soldier with a SSh-60 helmet

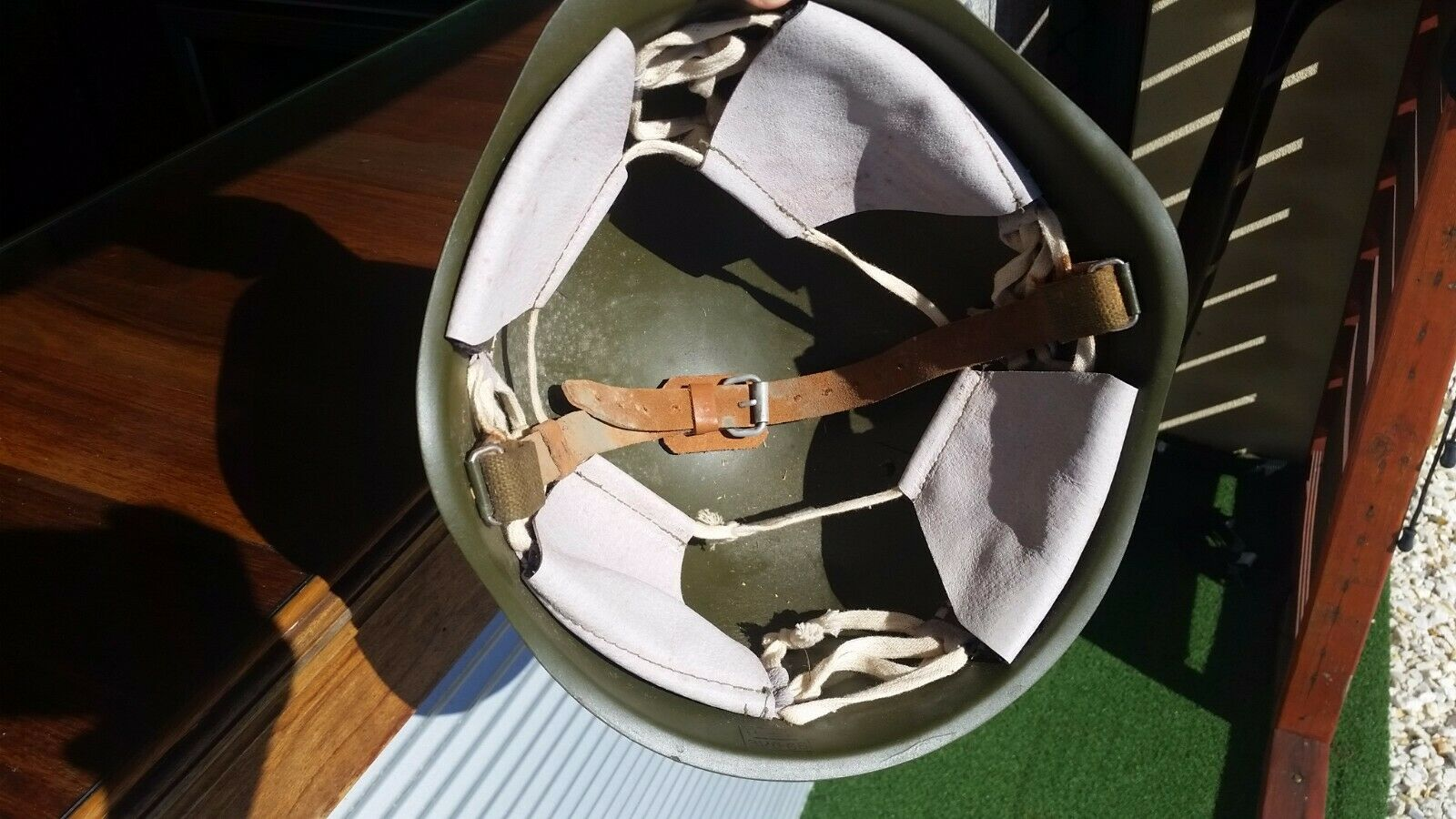
SSh-60 export helmet liner. Note that it is a lighter color compared to that of standard issue helmets

The SSh-60 (СШ-60 (Russian: стальной шлем образца 1960 года/stalnoy shlyem, or steel helmet) was a product improvement of the Soviet SSh-40 steel helmet of the Soviet Army and entered production around 1960. It was not fundamentally different from the previous World War 2 era SSh-40, the primary difference being an updated liner/suspension system.

== Design ==
The overall form and shell of the helmet remained unchanged. The internal harness was modified to include four brown vinyl flaps (rather than three as with the SSh-40) attached to the dome rivets. The flaps were moved to the top of the helmet along with two rivets and the chin strap. The flaps of the liner were threaded together with an adjustable white cord tie and they weren't padded as previous models, allowing the user to wear a fur winter cap (ushanka) beneath the helmet, by adjusting the ties accordingly.

An export version of the SSh-60 exists, designed for sale and exportation to other countries outside of the Soviet Union. It differs from the main issue helmet only with a change to the color of the helmet liner.

While the SSh-60 was intended to replace the SSh-40, it never fully did. Even after the introduction of the newer SSh-68, it continued to be used by several units as mixed issues. During the Soviet-Afghan War, both the SSh-40 and SSh-60 still remained in use with the Soviet Army.

The SSh-60 was exported to some Warsaw Pact members, and other countries including Vietnam, where it was mostly used by North Vietnamese Army anti-aircraft artillery crews during the Vietnam War; Syrian troops were issued with SSh-60s during the Yom Kippur War; Prior to the Iran-Iraq war, the Iraqi Army used the Polish wz. 50 besides SSh-40 and SSh-60 helmets, but these were gradually replaced by the M80 helmet.

== Users ==
=== Former ===
- Iraq − Replaced by the M80
- Soviet Union
- Ba'athist Syria
- Vietnam − Used by NVA anti-aircraft artillery crews and Military Police (Vietnamese: Kiem Soat Quan Su, lit. 'Military Control')
- Donetsk People's Republic - Used during the Donbass war and the Russo-Ukrainian war (2022–present)
- Luhansk People's Republic - Used during the Donbass war and the Russo-Ukrainian war (2022–present)
