= Hełm wz. 50 =

Polish military helmet

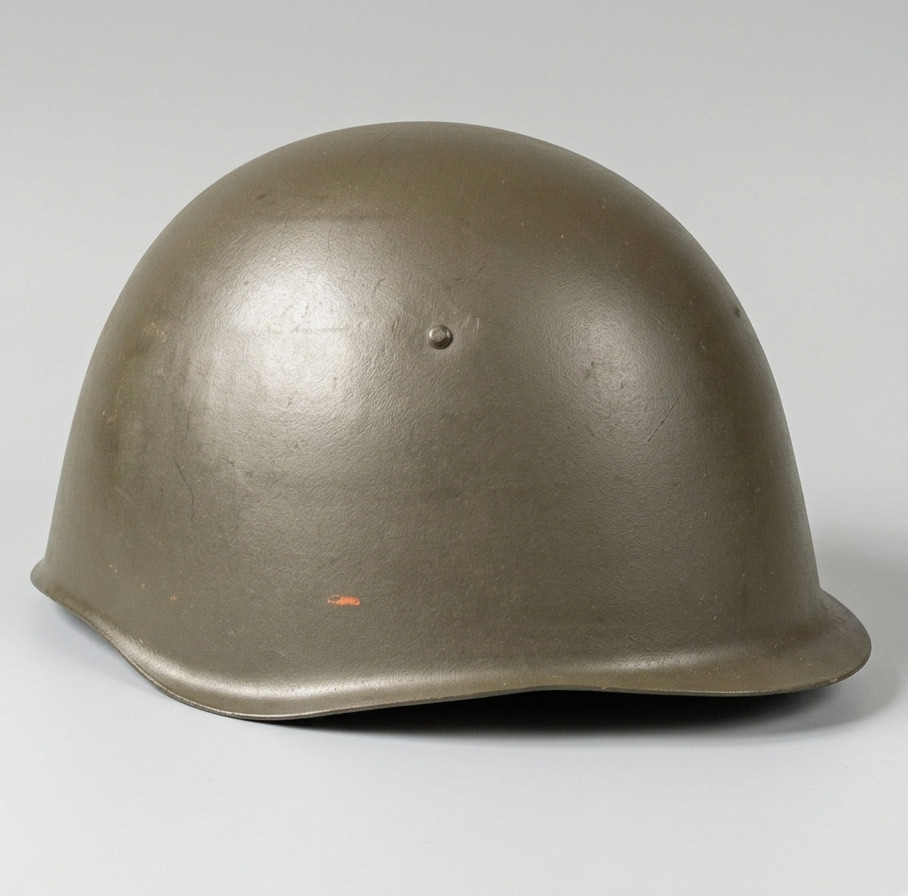
- Type: Combat helmet
- Place of origin: Polish People's Republic

Service history
- In service: 1950–1967 (Polish People's Army)
- Used by: See Users for details
- Wars: Vietnam War; Six-Day War; Warsaw Pact invasion of Czechoslovakia; Yom Kippur War; Iran-Iraq War; Gulf War

Production history
- Designed: 1950
- Manufacturer: Huta Ludwików; Huta Silesia
- Produced: 1950–1967
- No. produced: 533 910 (1955)

Specifications
- Weight: 1,2kg

The Wz50 (Polish: Hełm wz. 50) is a steel combat helmet produced in Polish People's Republic. During the Cold War from 1947 to 1991, these helmets would be widely exported to a number of Arab countries for its low price.

Replaced in Polish People's Army in year 1967 by the wz. 67 helmet.

== Design ==
After 1945, production of helmets wz. 31/50 (using pre-war resources) was not sufficient for the expanding Polish People's Army. In 1950, it was decided to launch the production of a new domestic helmet based on soviet pattern. The shell is another Warsaw Pact copy of the Soviet SSh-40 design, along with the Czech M53 and Hungarian M70.

It was the first mass-produced helmet design developed in Poland after World War II. Its prototype was the Soviet helmet Sch-40. This product had the following dimensions: height 166 mm, length 271 mm, width 248 mm. It was pressed from 1.4 mm thick special steel sheet. Its weight did not exceed 1200 g. The internal fittings were based on the Italian helmet M33. Its most important part was a springy hoop, to which the leather elements of the internal fittings and the lining were attached. The helmet's shell was painted smoothly with semi-matt varnish. The land forces used khaki helmets, the air forces used blue-gray helmets, and the Internal Military Service used white helmets. The helmet was tested by firing a 7.62 mm TT pistol or a 7.62 mm AK rifle from a distance of 3 m. The dimensions, rivet holes, the distance from the line connecting the centers of the rivet holes to the lower edge of the shell, and the materials from which it was made were also checked. If even one shell was found to be defective, the entire batch was returned to the plant for sorting and correction. The production of combat helmets was limited by the throughput of the annealing furnace used for thermal processing of the shells.

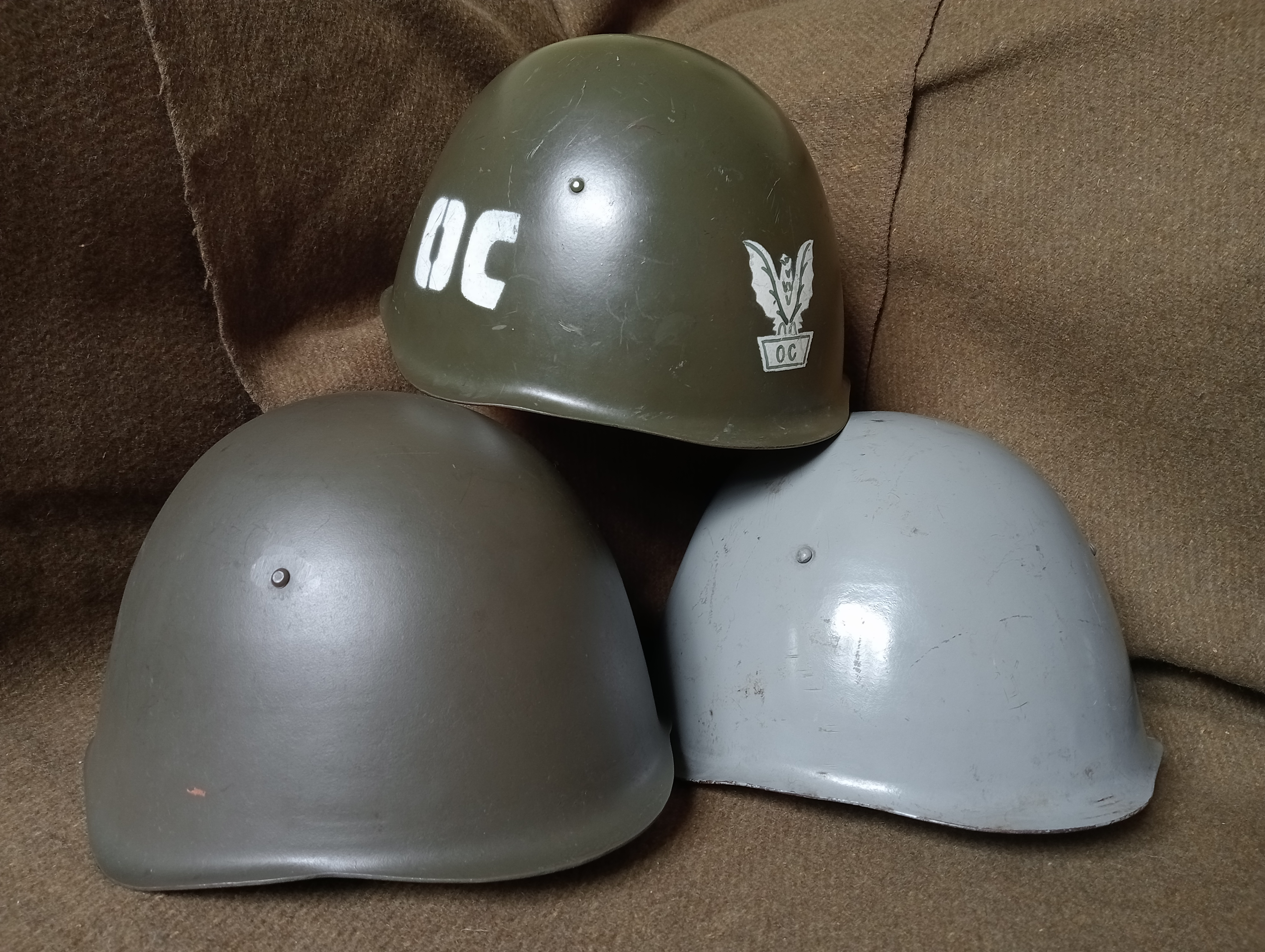
Comparison of the paint schemes of the wz. 50 helmets.

The exact number of wz. 50 helmets produced is unknown. At least 533,910 helmets were produced between 1950 and 1955.

Early pre-production helmets by a double riveted chinstrap and cow skin leather liner. All models of helmet would include a maker and manufacture stamp. Starting in 1962 branch specific stenciled insignia would be applied to the front. A variant for use by the civil defense was developed which featured a prominent crest on top and insignia on the side with its respective city.

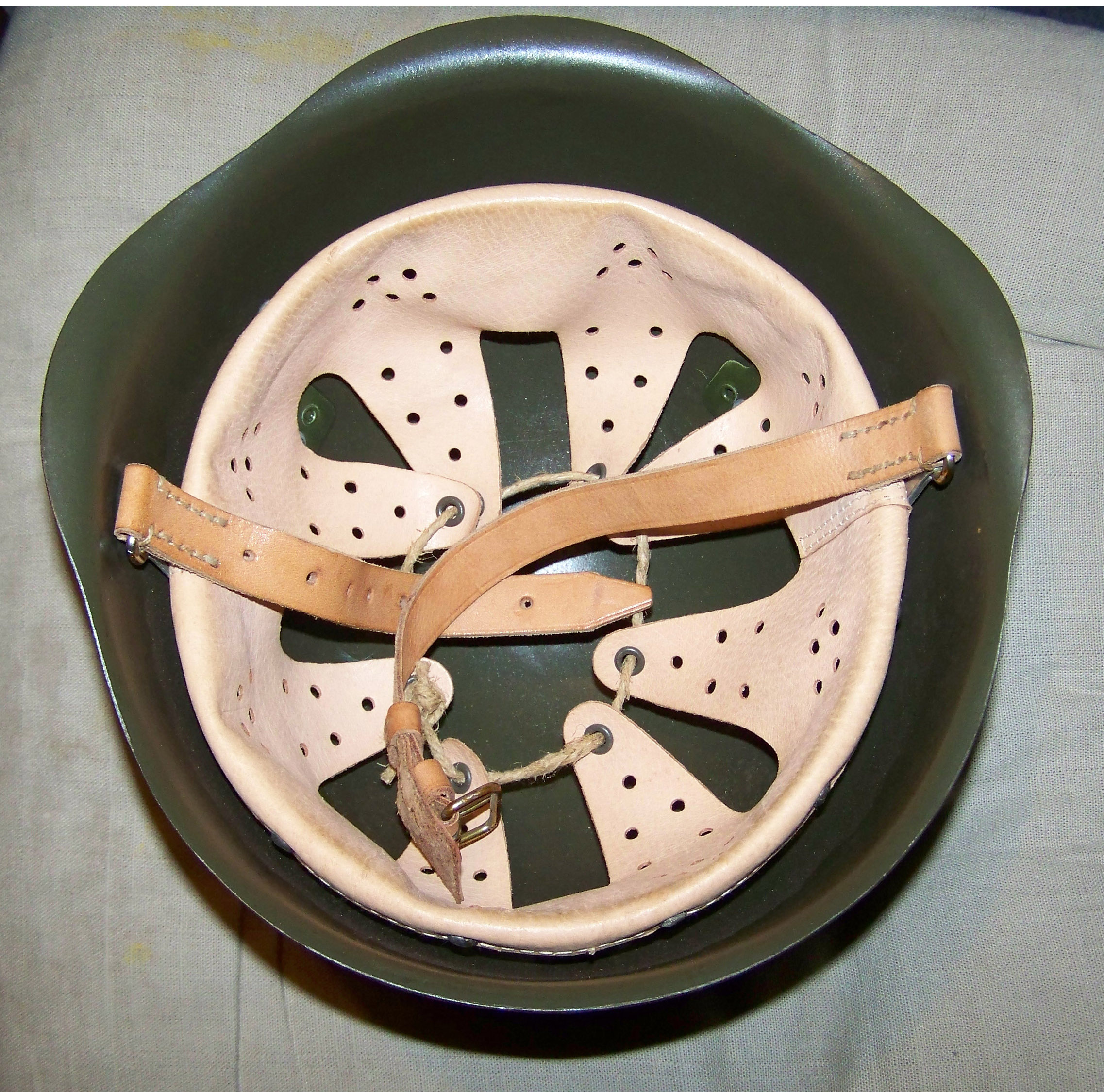
The hełm wz. 50 liner.

== Users ==
- Afghanistan
- Albania
- China
- Croatia
- Egypt
- Iraq: Replaced by the M80.
- Israel: Captured by the Israeli Army.
- North Vietnam
- Poland: Replaced in 1967 by the wz. 67 helmet.
- Ba'athist Syria
