= Kolpak-20 helmet =

Russian combat helmet

Kolpak-20
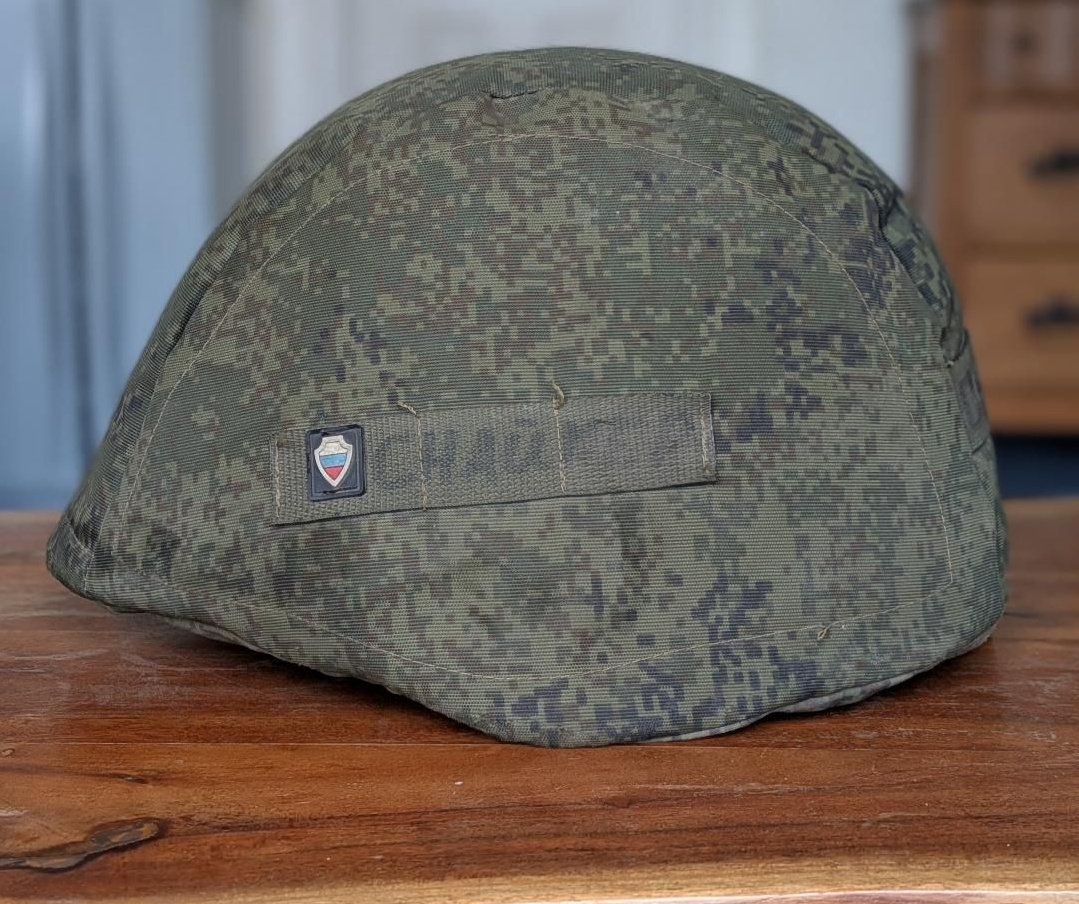
- Kolpak-20 helmet
- Type: Combat Helmet
- Place of origin: Russian Federation

Service history
- In service: 2022 – Current
- Used by: Russian Federation
- Wars: Russo-Ukrainian war (2022–present)

Production history
- Designer: NPO Spetsmaterialov
- Designed: 2022
- Manufacturer: NPO Spetsmaterialov
- Produced: 2022 – 2023

Specifications
- Weight: 2.2 kg.

The Kolpak-20 (Russian: КОЛПАК-20) is a Russian combat helmet designed by NPO Spetsmaterialov (NPO SM) that is used by the Russian Armed Forces. Its armor rating is listed as GOST BR2 by its manufacturer.

Production of the Kolpak-20 began in 2022, but ceased only a year later in 2023 due to media criticism and complaints from Russian soldiers. The largest criticism of the Kolpak-20 was its usage of surplus SSh-40 helmet shells.

== History ==
The Kolpak-20 was designed and produced specifically in order to fill in the gaps of Russian military stockpile shortages in the wake of the Russo-Ukrainian war (2022–present). The helmet has been described as a "half measure" and "substitute" for better ballistic helmets by critics.

The Kolpak-20 was mostly issued to troops in the 2022 Russian mobilization, and has been seen in use by Russian forces in nearly every Russo-Ukrainian battle since its introduction.

Production of the Kolpak-20 officially ceased in 2023.

== Design ==
The Kolpak-20 is composed of a SSh-40 steel outer shell and a polyethylene inner shell. On the outer shell, there are four rivets which are used to hold the shells and the helmet's suspension together. The helmet's suspension consists of 5 pads, a neck nape pad and a plastic quick release chinstrap. The Kolpak-20's design does not allow the user to wear hearing protection, communication devices or night vision goggles. The choice of using leftover WW2-era SSh-40 shells was criticised by Ukrainian news as well as Russian soldiers who were issued the Kolpak-20. Mounting pressure eventually forced Russian state media to have to address concerns about the Kolpak-20's ballistic characteristics.

== Users ==
=== Current ===
- Russian Federation - Used by Russian forces in the Russo-Ukrainian war.
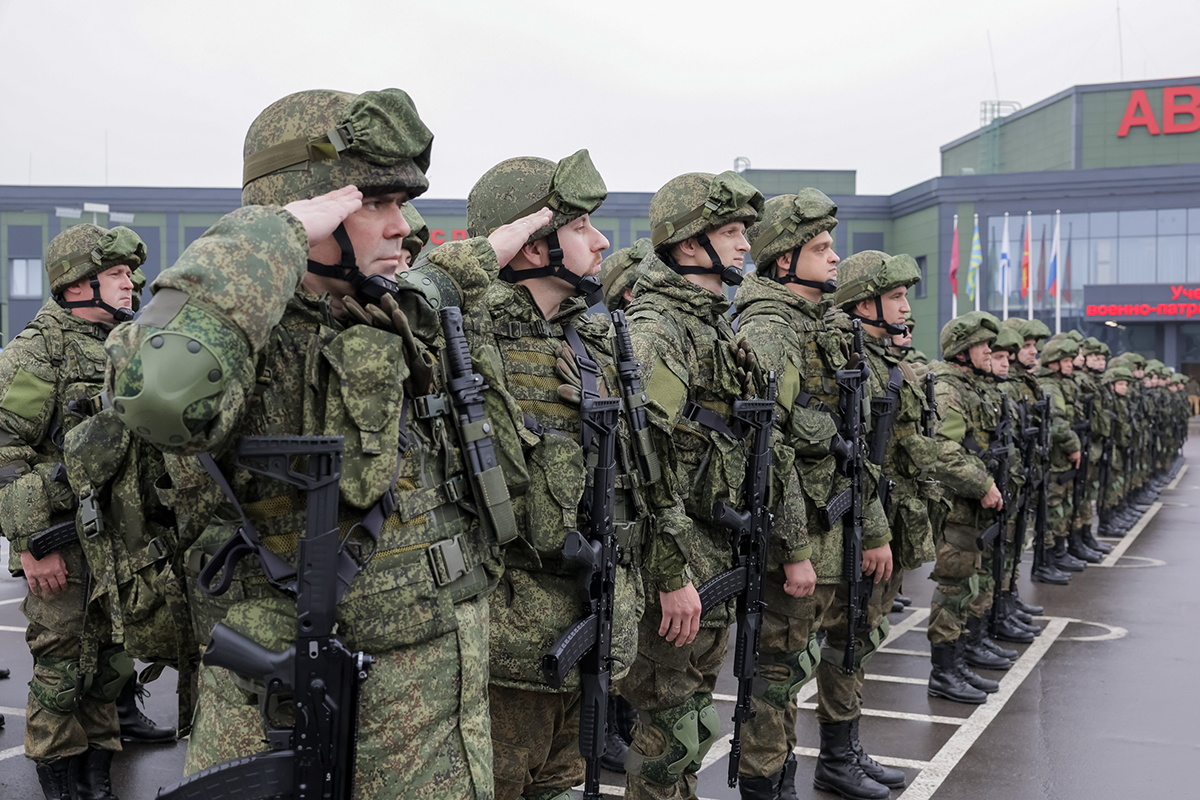
Mobilized Russian troops wearing the Kolpak-20. October 1, 2022

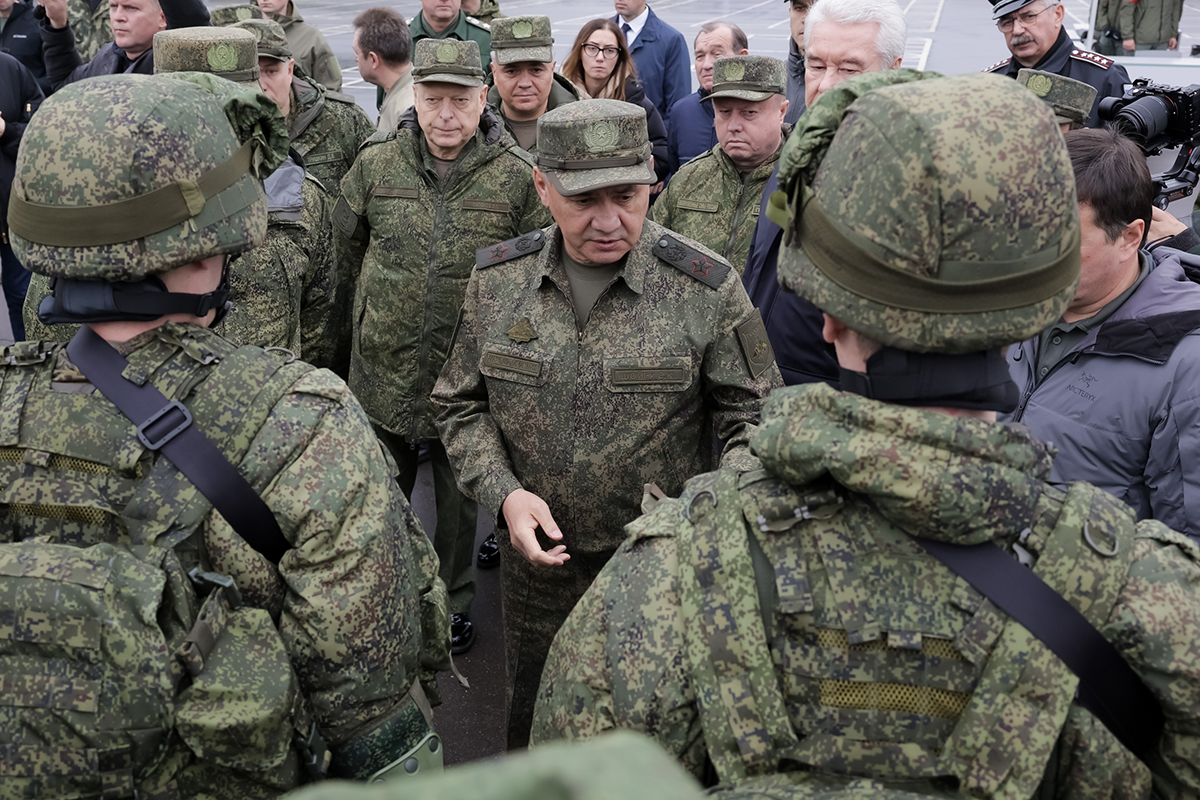
Sergey Shoigu inspecting mobilized troops wearing the Kolpak-20. October 1, 2022

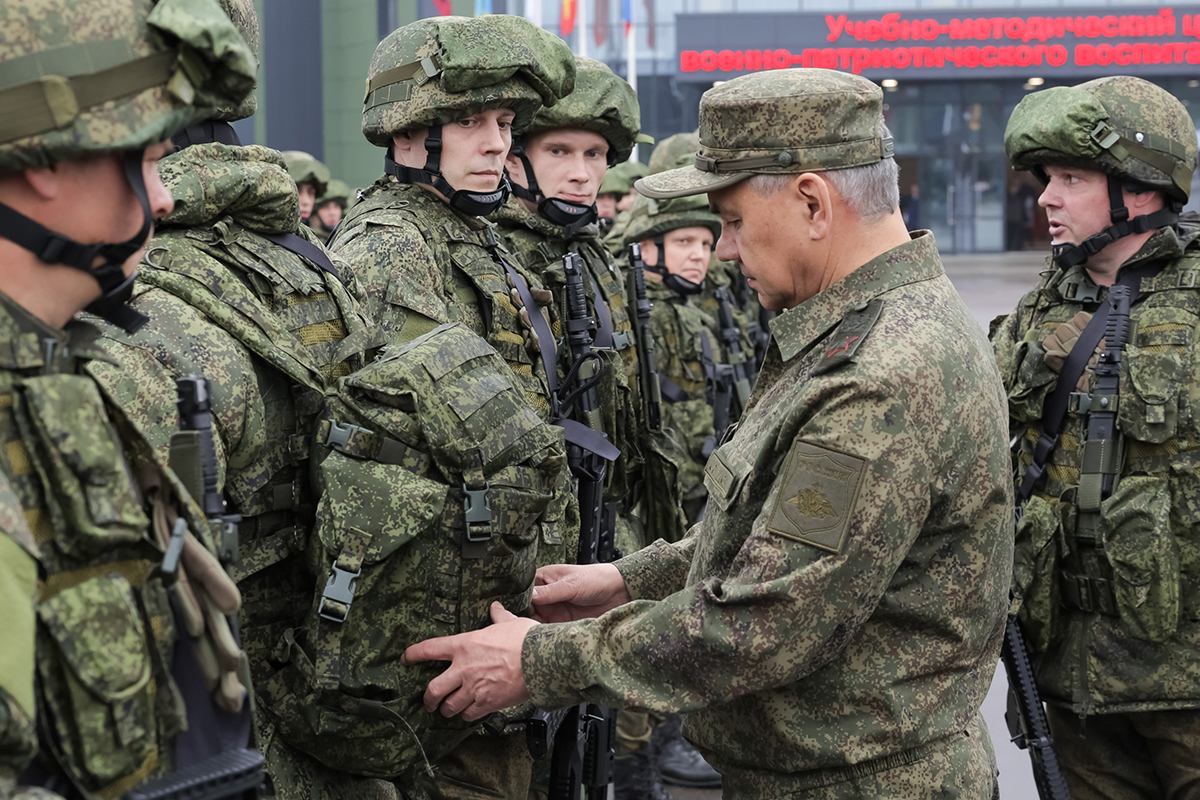
Sergey Shoigu inspecting mobilized troops wearing the Kolpak-20. October 1, 2022

== See also ==
- SSh-39 and SSh-40
