= SSh-36 =

Combat helmet in the Soviet Union

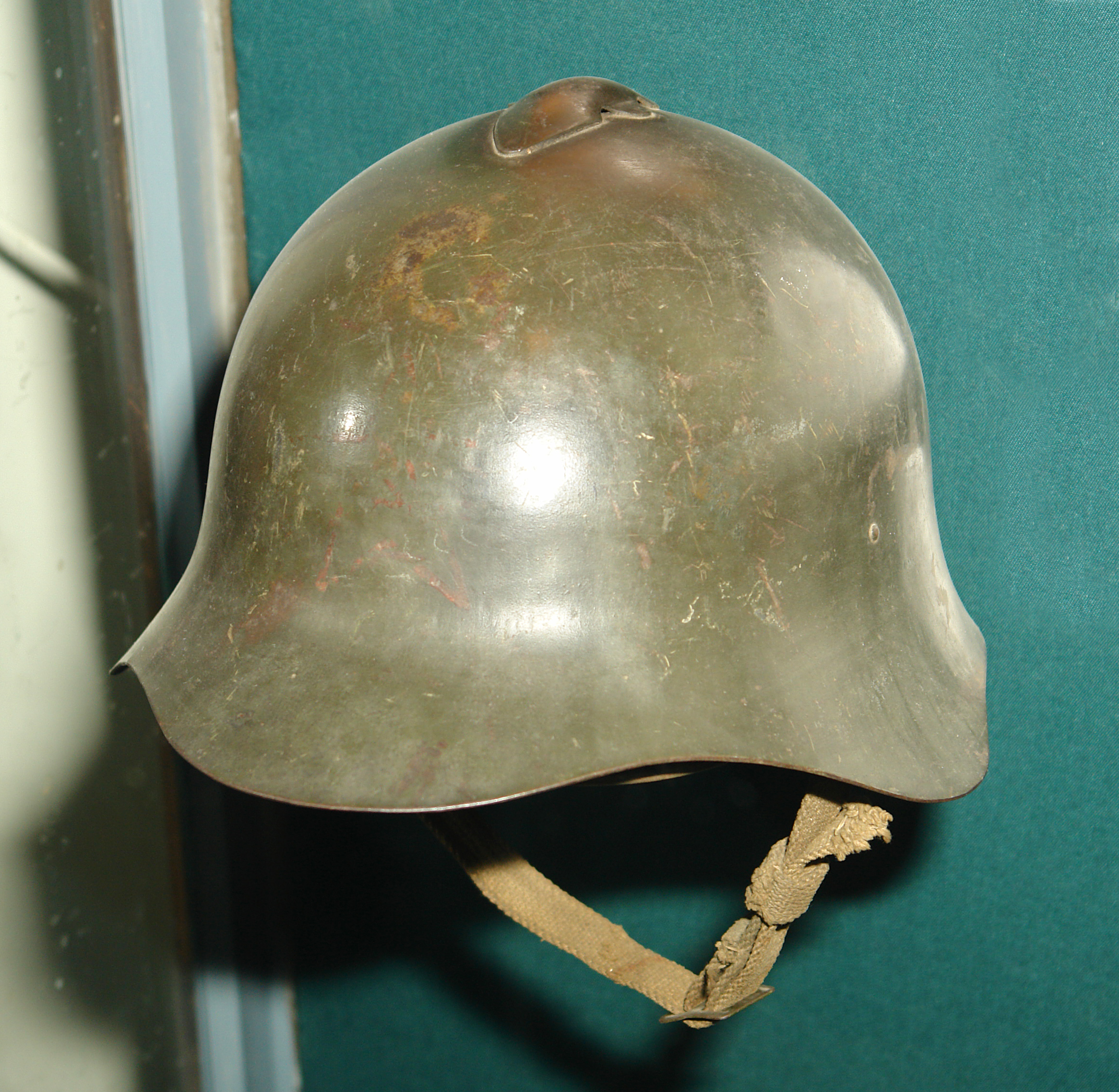
- SSh-36 helmet
- Type: Combat Helmet
- Place of origin: Soviet Union

Service history
- In service: 1936 – 1943
- Used by: See Users
- Wars: Soviet–Japanese border conflicts Spanish Civil War; Winter War; World War II

Production history
- Designer: Aleksandr A. Shvartz
- Produced: 1936 – 1941

Specifications
- Weight: 1.2 - 1.3 kg

The SSh-36 (Russian: СШ-36, from стальной шлем, stal'noy shlem, lit. 'steel helmet') was a steel combat helmet developed and used by the Red Army. It was designed by Aleksandr A. Shvartz with production started in 1936.

== History ==
The development of a new standard steel helmet began in the 1930s. After tests and trials, this helmet was officially adopted by the Red Army in December 1935 under the name "Red Army Helmet Model 1935" ("красноармейский шлем образца 1935 года"). It was because of the introduction of the steel helmet that changes were made to the uniform of military personnel - and the field service cap was introduced as standard headgear. The SSh prefix (a shortening of the Russian word Stalshlyem) first saw usage in 1939 following the development of the SSh-39.

The SSh-36 was worn by Soviet soldiers in several campaigns of the late 1930s and 1940s, including the Khalkin Gol campaign against the Japanese in 1939 (giving it the nickname "Khalkingolka"), the Finnish Winter War of 1939–1940, the 1939 invasion of Poland, the 1940 invasions of the Baltic states and Bessarabia, and in the Great Patriotic War 1941-1945.

It was also distributed to the International Brigades who fought for the Republicans in the Spanish Civil War, as well as distributed to the Republicans directly.

However, during its use, a significant number of design flaws were revealed. The wide brim was said to create wind resistance while running and made it difficult for a soldier to move and the large visor was said to reduce visibility. It was for these and other reasons that work began in 1939 on the next helmet, which was later named the SSh-39 and the SSh-40, both the 39 and 40 were practically the same, but had major differences in the liner. Beginning in 1940, the Red Army began to gradually phase out the SSh-36, but the beginning of the Soviet Union's involvement in the Second World War postponed this. As a result, the SSh-36 was issued alongside the SSh-40 until about 1943.

Production of the SSh-36 ended in 1941.

== Design ==
The SSh-36 was also fitted with a comb on top, which allowed for ventilation. There were also apocryphal claims that the comb was designed to deflect saber blows.

Early SSh-36s were made with fragile leather linings. Due to the unreliability of these early liners, later variations were introduced with cloth linings. Similar problems were also encountered with early leather chinstraps, so the leather chinstraps were phased out in favor of cloth models as well. Throughout their production four sizes were produced: small, medium, large, and extra large.

The design of the SSh-36 led to the creation of the SSh-39 and SSh-40 helmets.

== Users ==
- Second Spanish Republic
- USSR

== Bibliography ==
- Pappini, Umberto (2015). Gli Elmetti Del Corpo Truppe Volontarie Italiano e Della Guerra Civile Spagnola: The Helmets Italian C.T.V. and Spanish Civil War (in Spanish). Books & Memories. ISBN 978-0993357602.
- Clawson, Robert W. (2002). Russian Helmets: From Kaska to Stalshlyem, 1916-2001. R.J. Bender Pub. ISBN 978-0-912138-90-9.
