= Hungarian M70 =

Steel combat helmet used by Hungary

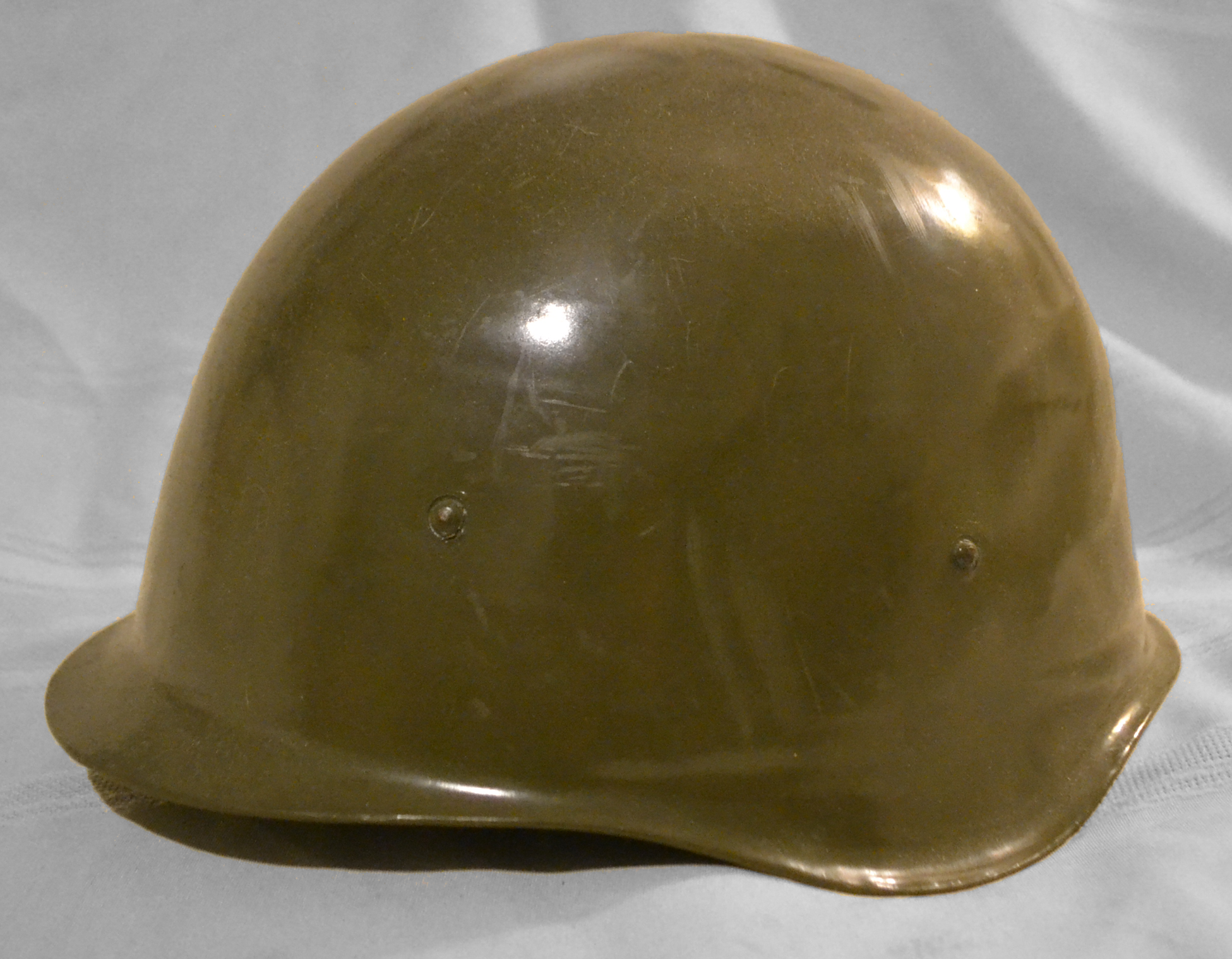
Hungarian M70, notice the glossier paint compared to an SSh-40.

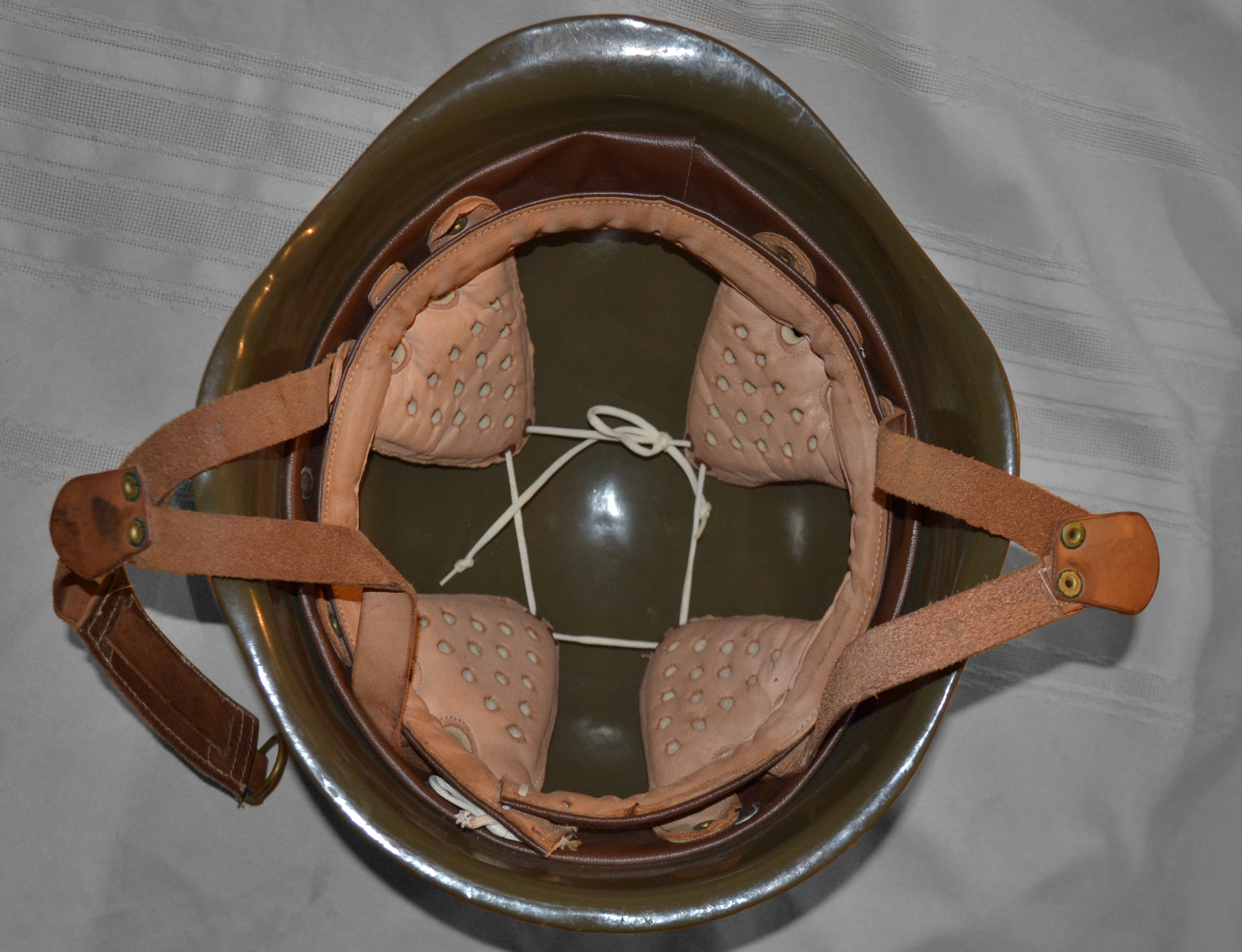
M70 Liner.

The M70 (Also known as M1970) is a steel combat helmet used by Hungary, a license made copy of the Soviet SSh-40 and further development of the previous model M50 helmet.

Adopted in 1970 and used into the 1990s with its replacement by the introduction of modern Kevlar combat helmets.

== Design ==
The shell is an exact copy of the Soviet SSh-40 design, the only difference being a unique liner among the copies produced among the Warsaw Pact nations of this helmet. The liner featuring four pads with multiple holes punched in them for ventilation, supposedly developed around 1965. The pads being attached to a metal band covered in leather to the liner as opposed to the much simpler three separate pads attached directly to the liner of the SSh-40. The chin strap having a four-point design with a hook and catch assembly and a chin pad. The shell has a dark olive green paint that has anti-infrared protection, giving it a glazed sheen.
