= JSC NPO Spetsmaterialov =

Russian defense manufacturer

- Type: Private (Joint-stock company)
- Industry: Defense
- Founded: 1993; 33 years ago
- Headquarters: Vyborgsky District, Saint Petersburg
- Key people: Mikhail Silnikov, CEO
- Products: Combat helmet Body armor Ballistic eyewear Police equipment
- Revenue: ▲ ₽2.02 million (2019)
- Number of employees: 455
- Website: www.npo-sm.ru

JSC NPO Spetsmaterialov, (Russian: АО «НПО Спецматериалов») or NPO SM, is a Russian arms manufacturer headquartered in Vyborgsky District, Saint Petersburg, Russia. It produces a variety of products, ranging from combat helmets and Body armor to Police equipment and anti-ramming barriers. It is considered a leader in the Russian military Protective equipment industry.

The company's main customers are the Russian Ministry of Defense, Russian Ministry of Internal Affairs, Russian Federal Security Service, and the Russian Federal Penitentiary Service. Its products are also exported to 35 countries.

== History ==
Originally a part of the Soviet Ministry of Defense Industry as a laboratory led by Mikhail Vladimirovich Silnikov, it was later reorganized in 1993 as a private company following the Dissolution of the Soviet Union.

NPO SM was sanctioned by the United States Department of the Treasury on June 12, 2024.

On March 31, 2026, the staff of NPO SM were awarded the Order of Alexander Nevsky by Vladimir Putin. The award was presented by St. Petersburg governor Alexander Beglov.

=== 2020 Criminal investigation ===
In November 2020, numerous Russian outlets began reporting that the Investigative Committee of Russia had opened a criminal case against NPO SM over allegations that NPO SM had purchased more than 40,000 Chinese riot helmets in order to fulfill state contracts from the Russian Ministry of Internal Affairs, while misrepresenting the helmets as domestically produced models. The Investigative Committee estimated the cost of damages at 48 million rubles. Mikhail Silnikov, CEO and general designer at NPO SM, denied the allegations and claimed that similarities to Chinese models were simply due to shared design origins. Ultimately, the case did not move forward and the Russian government continued to do business with NPO SM.

=== Role in the Russo-Ukrainian war ===
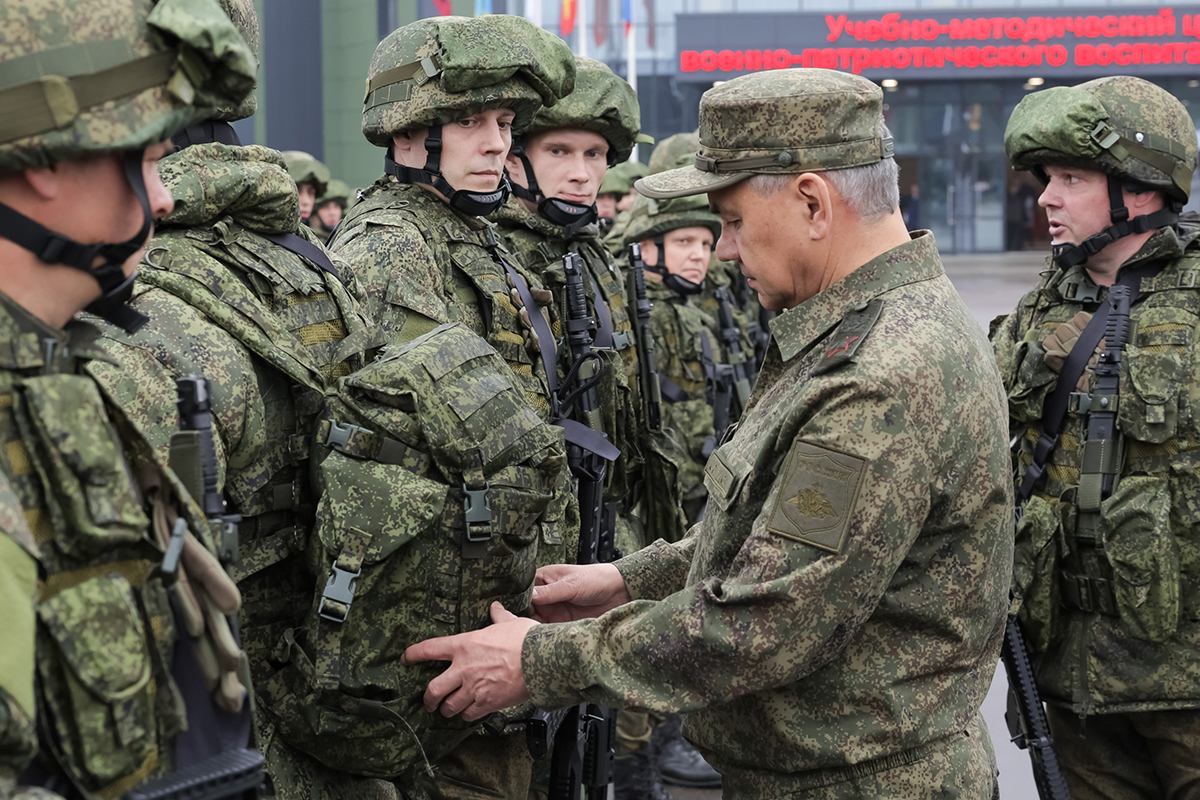
Mobilized Russian soldiers wearing the Kolpak-20 helmet, an NPO SM product. (2022)

Seeing the massive shortages of personal protective equipment in the Russian military, NPO SM began to mass produce body armor and combat helmets. The Monolit Module vest and the Kolpak-20 helmet, both NPO SM products, were criticized by Russian soldiers and Russian media due to their various quality issues. The latter product was discontinued in 2023.

After the 2022 Russian mobilizations began, NPO SM was selected as the contractor to fulfill the needs of the approximate 8,000 mobilized St. Petersburg residents. A fund of 15 billion rubles (around $235 million at the time) was authorized for this purpose by St. Petersburg governor Alexander Beglov. This move was criticized by some Russian outlets, as NPO SM was the largest donor to Alexander Beglov's campaign in the 2019 Saint Petersburg gubernatorial election.
