= Czechoslovak M53 helmet =

Helmet used by the Czechoslovak military starting in 1954

Czechoslovak Vz. 53 Helmet
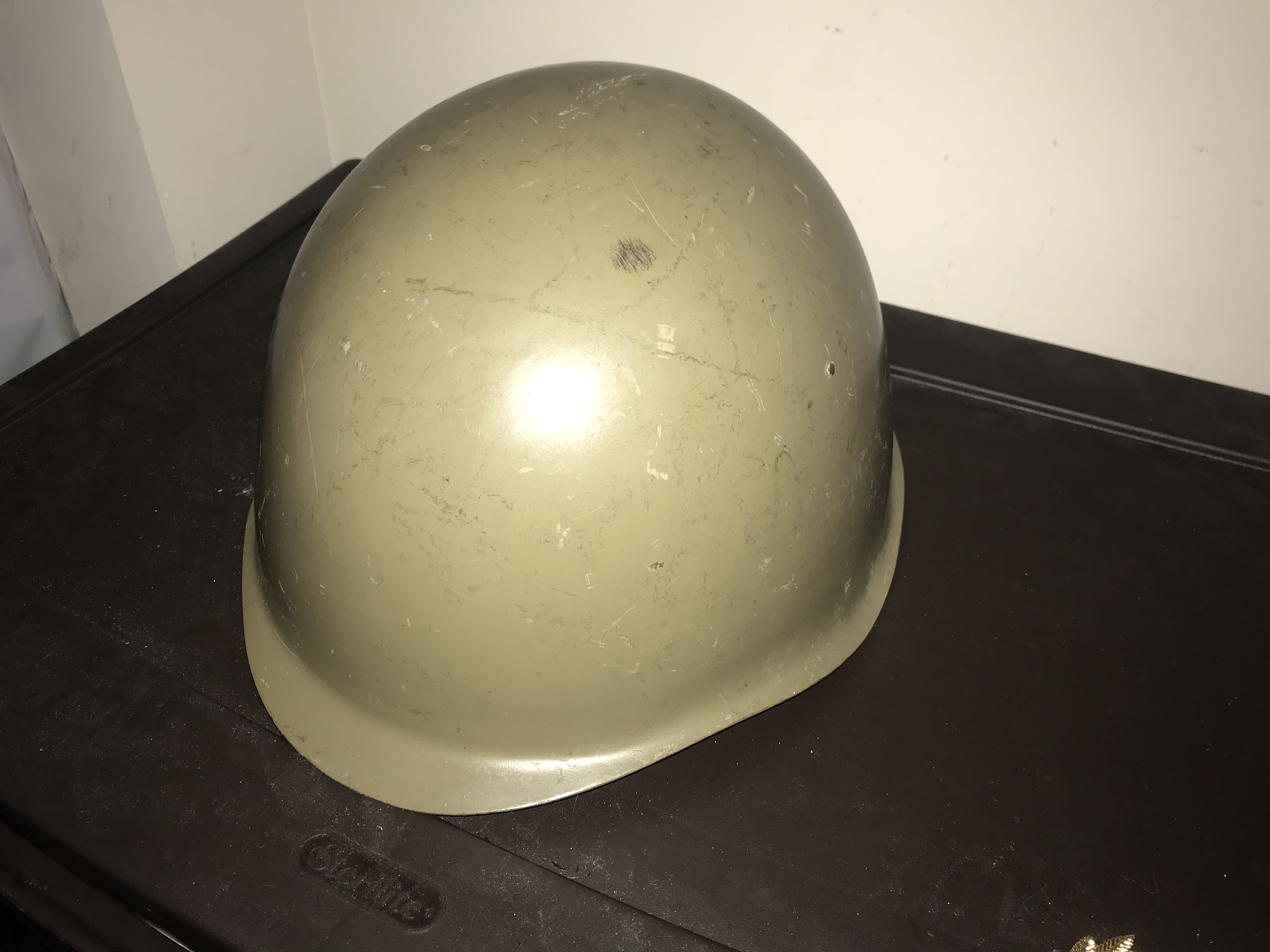
- A Vz. 53/80 shell
- Type: Combat helmet
- Place of origin: Czechoslovakia

Service history
- In service: 1954–present
- Used by: See Users
- Wars: Persian Gulf War

The Czechoslovak M53 helmet (Czech: Přilba vz. 53) was used by the Czechoslovak Army from the early 1950s onward. In western European countries and the United States, it is sometimes referred to as the Czech M53 helmet. These helmets are commonly mistaken for, and sometimes marketed as, Soviet SSh-40 helmets, and various other very similar Eastern Bloc helmets.

== History ==
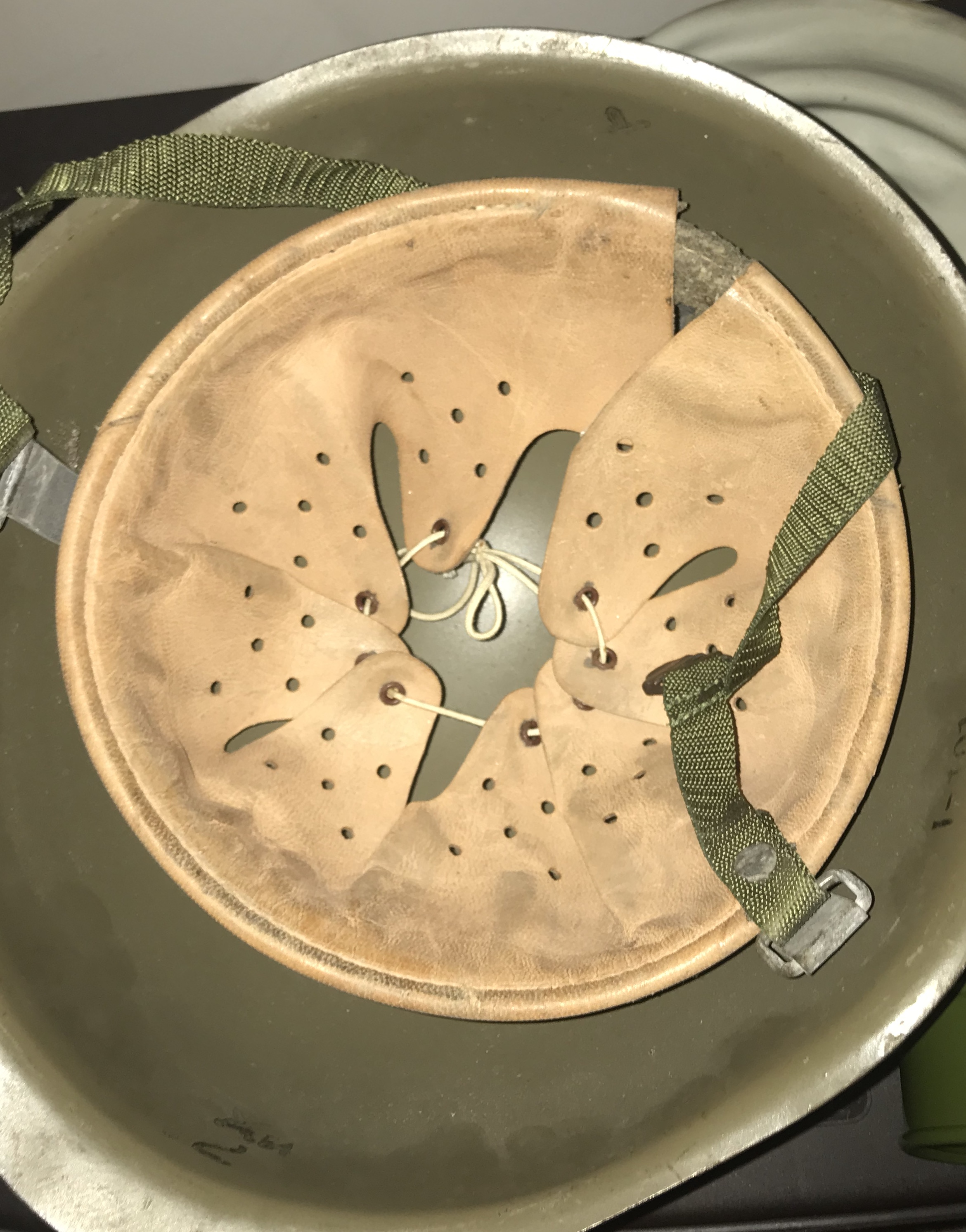
The liner of Vz. 53/80. This type of lining was also used in the German Stahlhelm

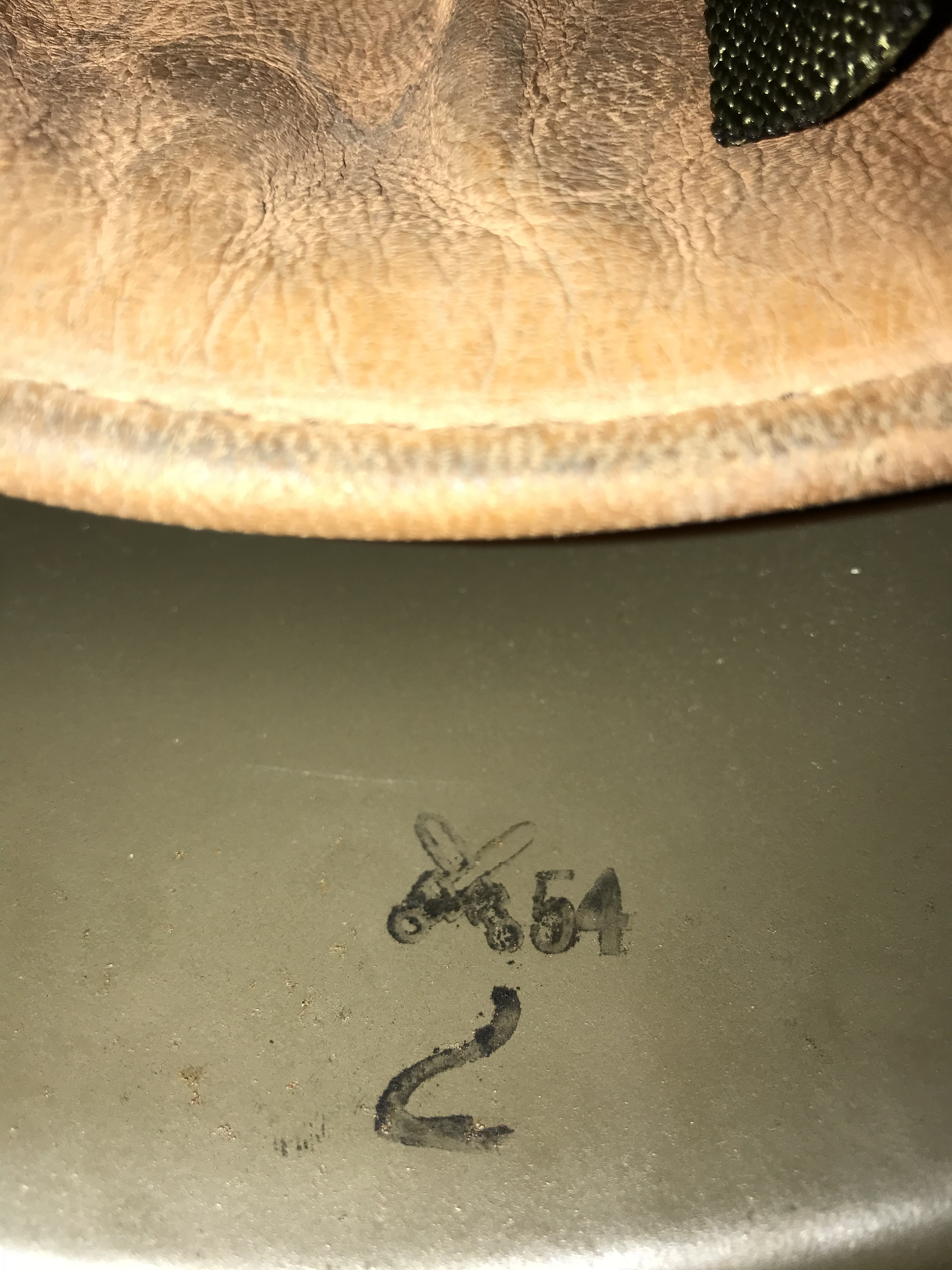
Czech seal of approval, manufacture date (1954), and the size (2) of the Vz. 53/80 pictured here

After World War II, the Soviet Union provided Czechoslovakia with Soviet SSh-39 and SSh-40 helmets for their newly formed military. These helmets were refitted with leather liners, much like the ones seen in the German Stahlhelm. These designs became the Vz. 52, which was the predecessor of the Vz. 53. Vz. 52 helmets that were constructed with the use of the Russian shells can be easily identified by a ring of 6 rivets around the head-band area of the shell and an additional 3 rivets up high near the top of the helmet.

Czechoslovakia exported Vz. 52 and Vz. 53 helmets to many countries. They were used by the North Vietnamese Army in the Vietnam War, and were also sent to various Eastern Bloc countries. These helmets can even be found in some modern conflicts in the Middle East, specifically in Afghanistan and Iraq. Many of the helmets found in the Middle East are leftover from the Cold War.

In the 1980s, Czechoslovakia replaced the leather strap with a four-point nylon strap along with a leather chin guard. This helmet came to be known as the Vz. 53/80, and was used as recently as 2004.

A version of the Vz. 53/80 is currently being used by Afghanistan Military Police forces, renamed the Afghanistan Vz. 53/80.

== Design ==
The Vz. 53 incorporates designs from a variety of different countries, specifically Germany and the USSR. The shape of the shell is an exact copy of the Soviet SSh-39 and SSh-40 shell, and a very small percentage of helmets are actually SSh-40's refitted with the Vz. 53's leather liner. These are the original helmets sent to Czechoslovakia by the USSR in the early 1950s as a way to support their renewed military.

The leather liner is a copy of the German Stahlhelm's, which is a good way to tell it apart from other similar Eastern Bloc helmets.

=== Identification ===
As military souvenirs, Vz. 53 helmets may be marketed online as a 'Soviet WW2 Helmet' to appeal to consumers more.

Although the Soviet SSh-39 and SSh-40 helmet shells do look similar to a Vz. 53, there are many ways to tell them apart. On a Czech Vz. 53 or any other variant of the Vz. 53 there should be a stamp of two crossed swords on the inside of the front of the helmet. This is the Czechoslovak seal of approval. Right next to that is a two-digit number indicating the year it was manufactured. For example, 56 means 1956. Directly below is a number 1, 2, or 3 indicating the size of the helmet.

== Users ==
=== Current ===
- Afghanistan: Afghan military police
- Cuba
- Egypt
- Slovakia

=== Former ===
- Albania
- Czechoslovakia
- Iraq
- North Vietnam
