= SSh-39 and SSh-40 =

Soviet combat helmets from World War 2

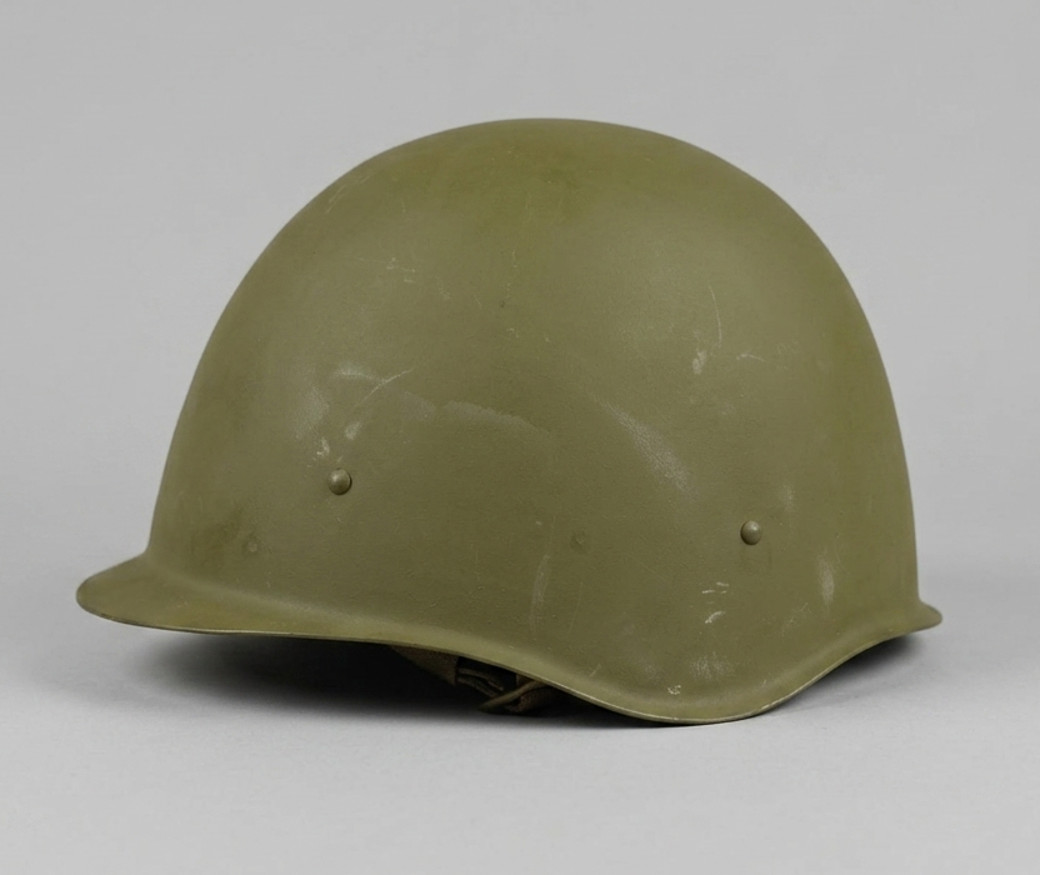
- SSh-40 helmet
- Type: Combat helmet
- Place of origin: Soviet Union

Service history
- In service: 1940–1989 (USSR)
- Used by: See users
- Wars: World War II; Korean War; Vietnam War; Six Day War; Yom Kippur War; Angolan Civil War; Iran–Iraq War; Soviet–Afghan War; War in Abkhazia (1992–1993); First Chechen War; Second Chechen War; Russo-Ukrainian war (2022–present) (See Kolpak-20)

Production history
- Produced: 1939–1960
- No. produced: 20,000,000 (wartime production estimate)

Specifications
- Weight: 1,3 kg

The SSh-39 (Russian: СШ-39) and SSh-40 (Russian: СШ-40, both from стальной шлем, stal'noy shlem, lit. 'steel helmet') were two similar designs of steel combat helmet designed and used by the Soviet Union's Red Army. They were the main forms of helmet in use during World War II and had only superficial differences between them.

== History ==
In 1931, soldiers of the Red Army received a small number of steel helmets. They were used during military exercises in 1931.

Since 1936, the first standard army helmet, the SSh-36, began to be made for the Red Army. In 1939, camouflage nets (worn over helmets to improve camouflage) began to be made in the USSR.

== SSh-39 ==
The SSh-39 was of simple, more modern design, and was much easier to manufacture than the SSh-36. It is also the design for the helmet on the Tomb of the Unknown Soldier in Moscow. The helmet was produced primarily in three factories, the Stalingrad Tractor Factory (designated CT in the ink stamp), the Red October Factory (ЗКО) also in Stalingrad, and the Lysva Metallurgical Factory (LMZ). The first liner was a seven-finger leather liner, similar to that of the German Stahlhelm liner designs. Next came a liner made of thin Gralex. The final version of the SSh-39 liner was cloth, similar to the SSh-36 liner. All three variations of the liner were suspended from the helmet by three metal tabs, which were riveted to the shell near the top.

This helmet, like the earlier SSh-36, saw action in numerous campaigns before its production was phased out in early 1943 in favor of the SSh-40.

== SSh-40 ==
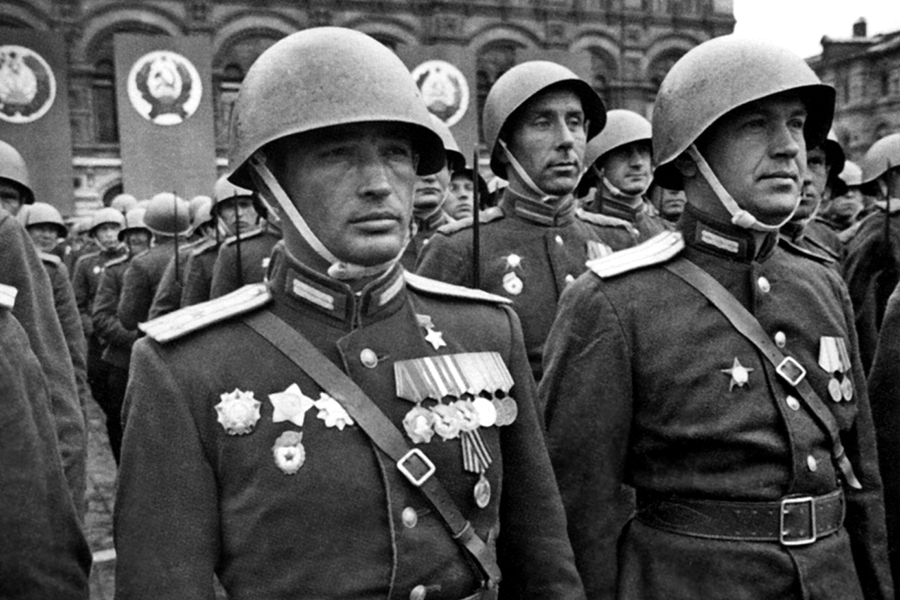
Soviet soldiers in SSh-40 helmets at 1945 Victory Parade

The SSh-40 helmet was the most widely produced and the most commonly seen in-service steel helmet used by the USSR in 1941–1945, but it was not the only steel helmet produced in the USSR in 1941–1945. On August 29, 1941, a decision was made to produce steel helmets for the local air defense units of Leningrad. After this, in August–September 1941, at least 17,272 SShN steel helmets (СШН – "стальной шлем наблюдателя") were produced at two factories in Leningrad. These helmets were used by local air defense units and city militsiya during the Axis blockade of Leningrad 1941–1944, and were later replaced by standard military helmets.

The only external difference between the SSh-39 and the SSh-40 was the six rivets near the bottom of the helmet, as opposed to the three near the top of the SSh-39 shell. Rivet placement of the SSh-40 was due to a newly introduced liner, simpler and sturdier than the previous versions. The liner consisted of three (later four during post-war) cloth or oilcloth pads connected with a cotton drawstring for size adjustment. The chinstrap was made of cotton and connected to D-rings on each side of the shell by tabs. The chinstrap ends were connected with a slip buckle, and a semi-circular metal piece was clamped to the end of the long chinstrap. Unlike the SSh-36 and SSh-39, the SSh-40 was only manufactured in three sizes, 1–3.

According to tests performed in 1942, Soviet helmets including the SSh-36 and SSh-40 provided better protection than the German Stahlhelm, but they were also heavier, making them uncomfortable to wear for extended periods of time. Chronic shortages of metals coupled with a large amount of equipment lost in 1941 during Operation Barbarossa left many Red Army units without steel helmets, but even when they were issued several soldiers preferred using soft-fur lined caps. The SSh-40 was supplemented by the SSh-60 which entered service in the 1960s and finally replaced by the SSh-68, though many remained in use as late as 1989, during the Soviet withdrawal from Afghanistan.

The SSh-40 saw limited use during the early stages of the Korean War by Korean People's Army troops entering Seoul in 1950, but as the war progressed and equipment shortages became more acute, steel helmets largely disappeared amongst KPA forces. While some special units of the KPA were issued with steel helmets, the vast majority of troops wore simple caps. During the Vietnam War, the North Vietnamese Army used mostly sun helmets, while steel helmets such as the SSh-40 and SSh-60 were used mostly by anti-aircraft artillery crews. The SSh-40 was also used by Iraqi troops during the Iran-Iraq war, though it was largely replaced by the M80 helmet.

== Users ==
=== Current ===
- North Korea − North Korea, while governed by the Soviet Civil Administration, received SSh-40s from the Soviets. Domestically produced copies of the SSh-40 remain in use as of 2024
- Russia − The SSh-40 Remained in use during the 1990s. The Kolpak-20, a reinforced variant of the SSh-40, remains in active use today

=== Former ===
- China − SSh-40, adopted after World War II, it increasingly grew unpopular with troops during the Sino-Soviet Split before it was replaced with domestic designs in the 1970s
- Cuba - SSh-40, used during the Angolan Civil War
- East Germany − SSh-40, replaced by the M-56 helmet
- Iraq − SSh-40, replaced by the M80 helmet
- Poland − SSh-40, used by Polish People's Army in 1943−1950, replaced by the wz. 50 helmet
- Romania − SSh-40, replaced by the M-1973 helmet
- Nazi Germany - SSh-39 and SSh-40, captured examples used by Luftschutz
- Ba'athist Syria - Used by Syrian troops during the Six Day War and the Yom Kippur War.
- Soviet Union − The SSh-40 remained in use as late as 1989
- Vietnam − Limited usage of the SSh-40 during the Vietnam War, mostly by NVA anti-aircraft artillery crews

=== States with limited recognition former ===
- Chechen Republic of Ichkeria - SSh-40 seen in use by Chechen rebels during the First Chechen War
- Abkhazia - SSh-40 used by Abkhazian militias during the War in Abkhazia (1992–1993)
