= Bulletproof vest =

Form of body armor that protects the torso from some projectiles

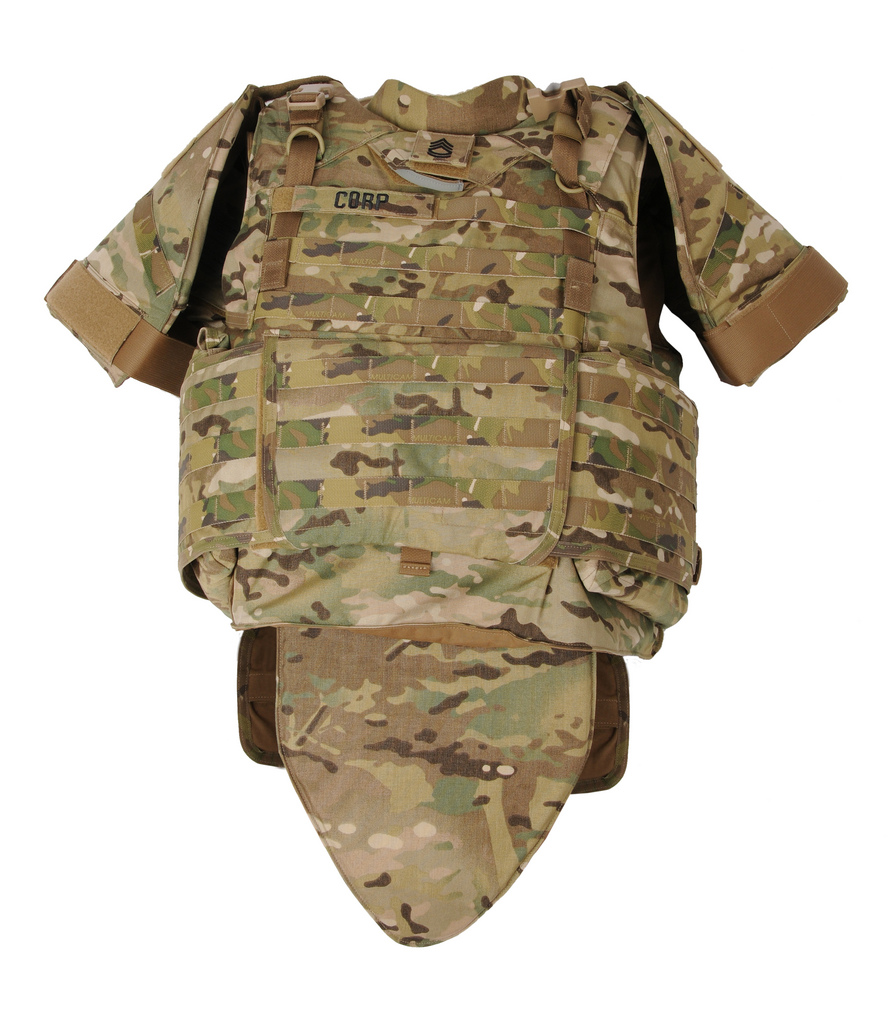
The Improved Outer Tactical Vest (IOTV) in MultiCam, as issued to United States Army soldiers

A bulletproof vest, also known as a ballistic vest or bullet-resistant vest, is a type of body armor designed to absorb impact and prevent the penetration of firearm projectiles and explosion fragments to the torso. The vest can be either soft—as worn by police officers, security personnel, prison guards, and occasionally private citizens to protect against stabbing attacks or light projectiles—or hard, incorporating metallic or para-aramid components. Soldiers and police tactical units typically wear hard armour, either alone or combined with soft armour, to protect against rifle ammunition or fragmentation. Additional protection includes trauma plates for blunt force and ceramic inserts for high-caliber rounds. Bulletproof vests have evolved over centuries, from early designs like those made for knights and military leaders to modern-day versions. Early ballistic protection used materials like cotton and silk, while contemporary vests employ advanced fibers and ceramic plates.

== History ==
=== Early modern era ===
In 1538, Duke Francesco Maria della Rovere, a condottiero, commissioned Filippo Negroli to create a bulletproof vest. In 1561, Maximilian II, Holy Roman Emperor is recorded as testing his armour against gunfire. Similarly, in 1590 Henry Lee of Ditchley expected his Greenwich armour to be "pistol proof". Its actual effectiveness was controversial at the time.

During the English Civil War, Oliver Cromwell's Ironside cavalry were equipped with lobster-tailed pot helmets and musket-proof cuirasses which consisted of two layers of armour plating. The outer layer was designed to absorb the bullet's energy and the thicker inner layer stopped further penetration. The armour would be left badly dented but still serviceable.

=== Industrial era ===
One of the first examples of commercially sold bulletproof armour was produced by a tailor in Dublin in the 1840s. The Cork Examiner reported on his line of business in December 1847.

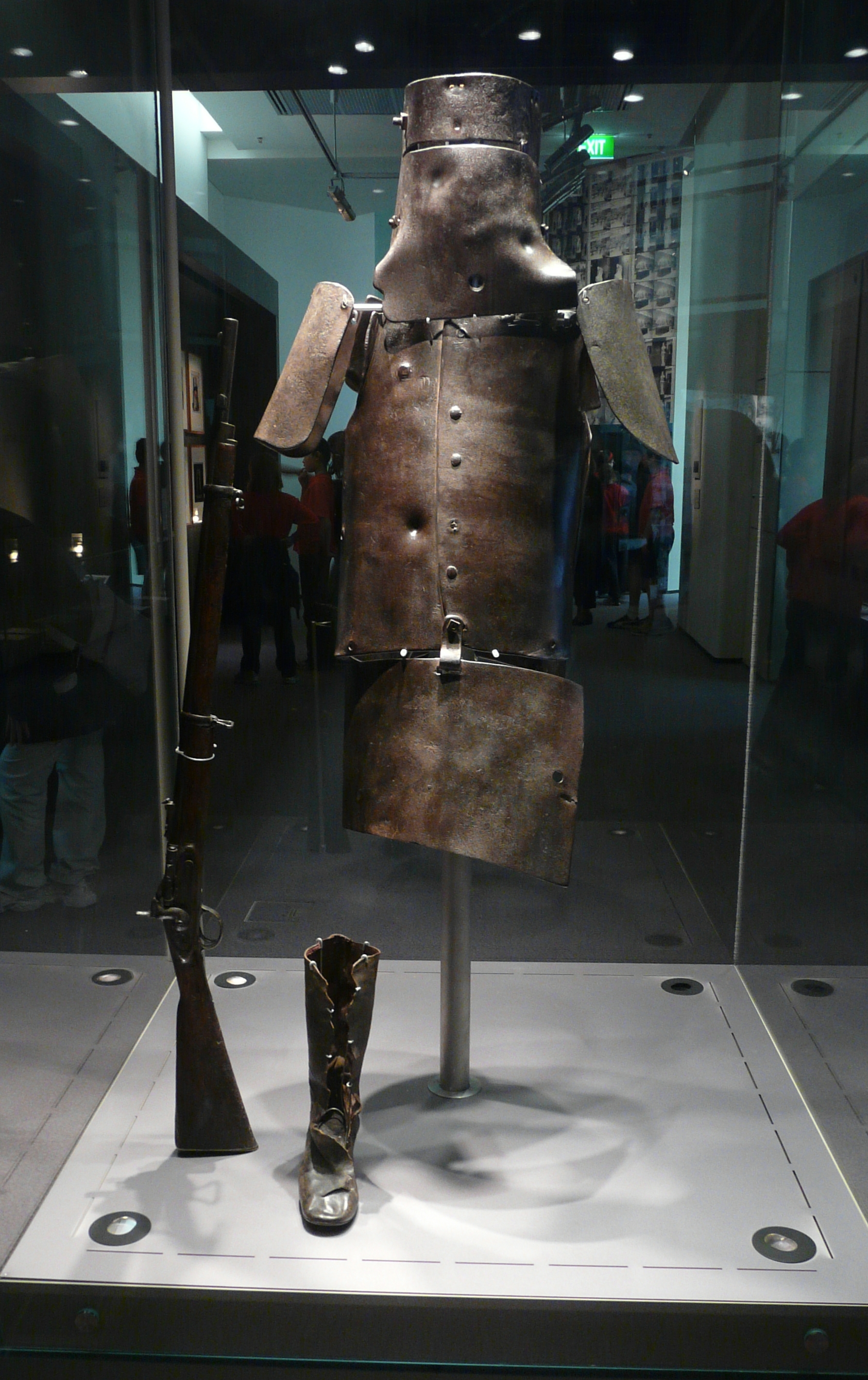
Australian bushranger and outlaw Ned Kelly's bulletproof armour, fashioned from plough mouldboards in 1880

Another soft ballistic vest, Myeonje baegab, was invented in Joseon Korea in the 1860s shortly after the punitive 1866 French expedition to Korea. The regent of Joseon ordered the development of bulletproof armour because of increasing threats from Western armies. Kim Gidu and Gang Yun found that cotton could protect against bullets if 10 layers of cotton fabric were used. The vests were used in battle during the United States expedition to Korea, when the US Navy attacked Ganghwa Island in 1871. The US Navy captured one of the vests and took it to the US, where it was stored at the Smithsonian Museum until 2007. The vest has since been sent back to Korea and is currently on display to the public.

Simple ballistic armor was sometimes constructed by criminals. In 1880, a gang of Australian bushrangers led by Ned Kelly devised their own suits of bulletproof armour. The suits had a mass of around 44 kilograms (97 lb) and were fashioned from stolen plough mouldboards, most likely in a crude bush forge and possibly with the assistance of blacksmiths. With a cylindrical helmet and apron, the armour protected the wearer's head, torso, upper arms, and upper legs. In June 1880, the four outlaws wore the suits in a gunfight with the police, during which Kelly survived at least 18 bullets striking his armour.

In the 1890s, American outlaw and gunfighter Jim Miller was infamous for wearing a steel breastplate under his frock coat as a form of body armor. This plate saved Miller on two occasions, and it proved to be highly resistant to pistol bullets and shotguns. One example was his gunfight with a sheriff named George A. "Bud" Frazer, where the plate managed to deflect all bullets fired by the lawman's revolver.

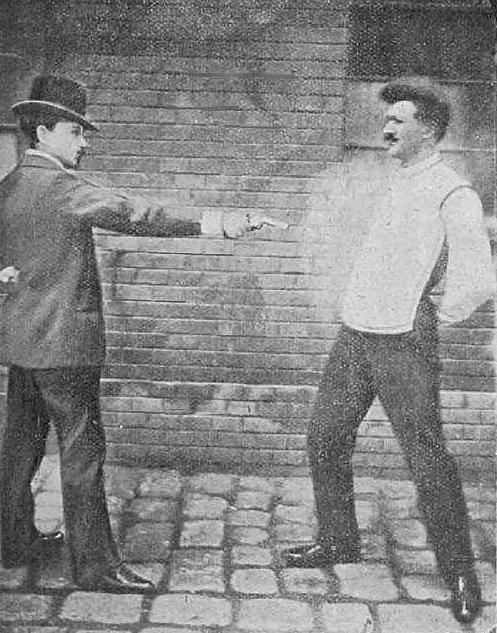
Test of a 1901 vest designed by Jan Szczepanik, in which a 7 mm revolver is fired at a person wearing the vest

In 1881, the Tombstone, Arizona physician George E. Goodfellow noticed that Charlie Storms, who was shot twice by faro dealer Luke Short, had one bullet stopped by a silk handkerchief in his breast pocket that prevented that bullet from penetrating. In 1887, he wrote an article titled "Impenetrability of Silk to Bullets" for the Southern California Practitioner documenting the first known instance of bulletproof fabric. He experimented with silk vests resembling gambesons that used 18 to 30 layers of silk to protect the wearers from penetration.

Kazimierz Żegleń used Goodfellow's findings to develop a silk bulletproof vest at the end of the 19th century, which could stop the relatively slow rounds from black powder handguns. The vests cost US$800 each in 1914, equivalent to $26,000 in 2025.

A similar vest made by Polish inventor Jan Szczepanik in 1901 saved the life of Alfonso XIII of Spain when he was shot by an attacker. By 1900, US gangsters were commonly wearing the $800 silk vests to protect themselves.

=== First World War ===
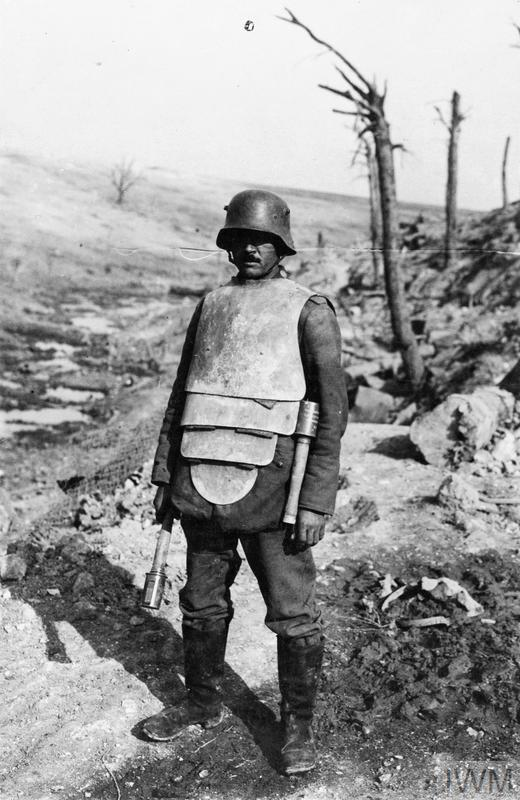
World War I German Infanterie-Panzer, 1917

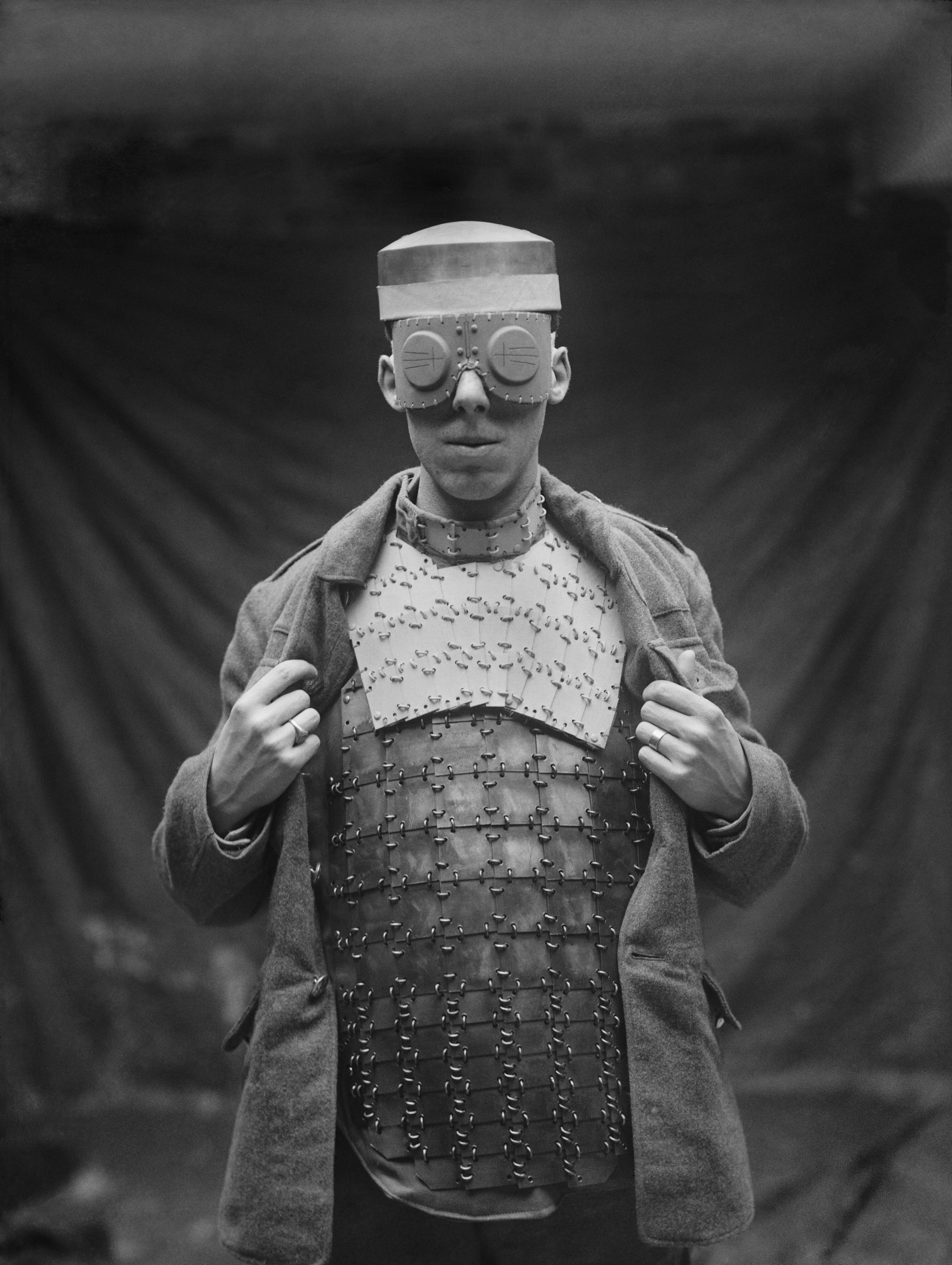
Franco-British armour, intended to be worn under a tunic, and British splinter goggles for eye protection.

The combatants of World War I started the war without any attempt at providing the soldiers with body armor. Various private companies advertised body protection suits such as the Birmingham Chemico Body Shield, although these products were generally far too expensive for an average soldier.

The first official attempts at commissioning body armor were made in 1915 by the British Army Design Committee, Trench Warfare Section in particular a 'Bomber's Shield'; "bomber" being the term for those who threw grenades rather than grenadier. The Experimental Ordnance Board also reviewed potential materials for bullet and fragment proof armor, such as steel plate. A 'necklet' was successfully issued on a small scale (due to cost considerations), which protected the neck and shoulders from bullets traveling at 600 ft/s (180 m/s) with interwoven layers of silk and cotton stiffened with resin. The Dayfield body shield entered service in 1916 and a hardened breastplate was introduced the following year.

The British army medical services calculated towards the end of the War that three quarters of all battle injuries could have been prevented if an effective armor had been issued.

The French experimented with steel visors attached to the Adrian helmet and 'abdominal armor' designed by General Adrian, in addition to shoulder "epaulets" to protect from falling debris and darts. These failed to be practical, because they severely impeded the soldier's mobility. The Germans officially issued body armor in the form of nickel and silicon steel armor plates that was called Sappenpanzer (nicknamed 'Lobster armor') from late 1916. These were similarly too heavy to be practical for the rank-and-file, but were used by static units such as sentries and occasionally machine-gunners. An improved version, the Infanterie-Panzer, was introduced in 1918, with hooks for equipment.

The United States developed several types of body armor, including the chrome nickel steel Brewster Body Shield, which consisted of a breastplate and a headpiece and could withstand Lewis Gun bullets at 2,700 ft/s (820 m/s), but was clumsy and heavy at 40 lb (18 kg). A scaled waistcoat of overlapping steel scales fixed to a leather lining was also designed; this armor weighed 11 lb (5.0 kg), fit close to the body, and was considered more comfortable.

=== Interwar period ===
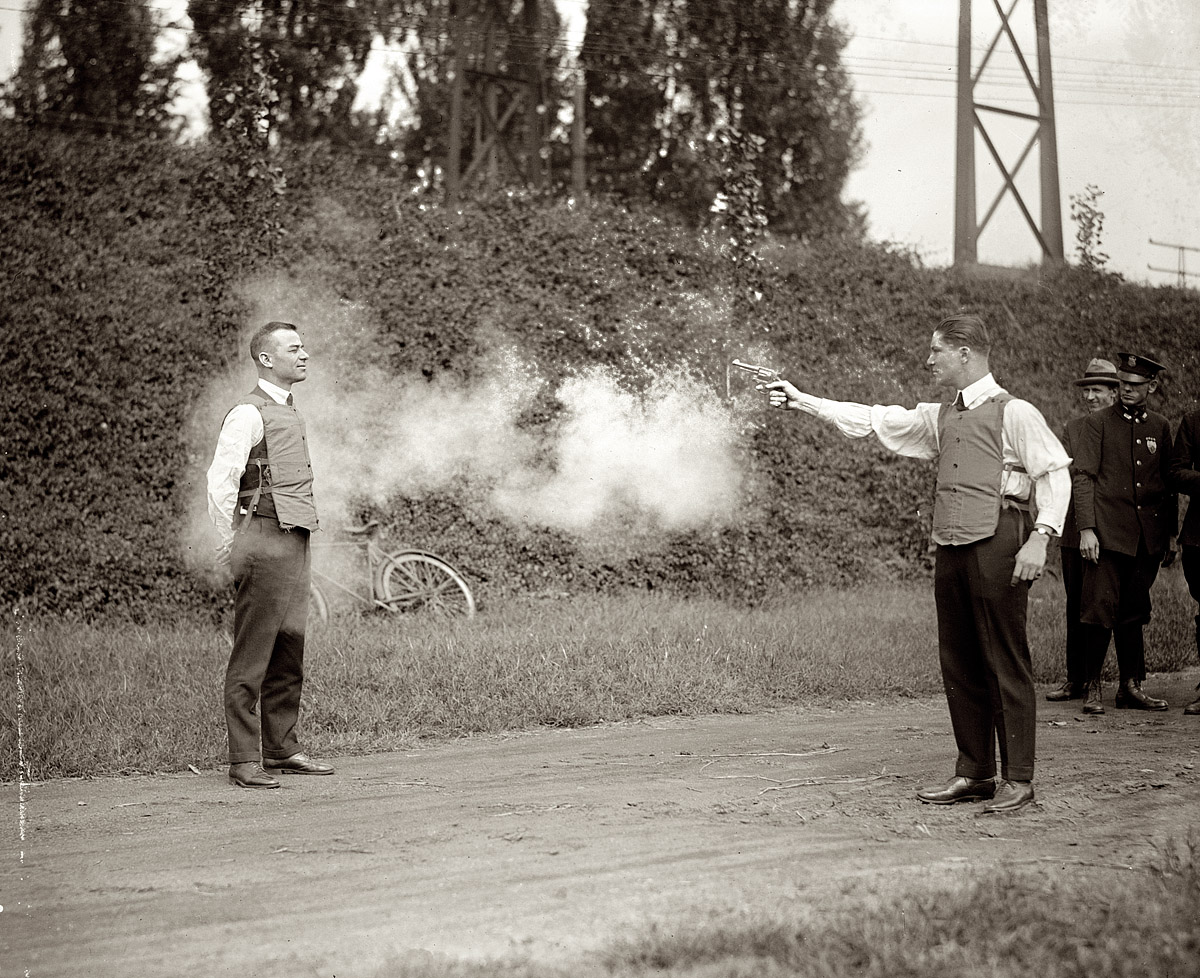
Testing a bulletproof vest in Washington, D.C., September 1923

During the late 1920s through the early 1930s, gunmen from criminal gangs in the United States began wearing less-expensive vests made from thick layers of cotton padding and cloth. These early vests could absorb the impact of handgun rounds such as .22 Long Rifle, .25 ACP, .32 S&W Long, .32 S&W, .380 ACP, .38 Special and .45 ACP traveling at speeds of up to 300 m/s (980 ft/s). To overcome these vests, law enforcement agents began using the newer and more powerful .38 Super and later the .357 Magnum cartridges.

Meanwhile, the Dunrite Bulletproof Vest, produced by Detective Publishing Company Chicago, was used by some members of law enforcement. The vest itself was made of wool, but its protection came from 15 pounds (6.8 kg) of metal.

Similar vests were often stolen or obtained in other ways by gangsters, often in direct sales. One Dunrite Bullet Bulletproof Vest was found in the back of Bonnie and Clyde's car.

=== Second World War ===
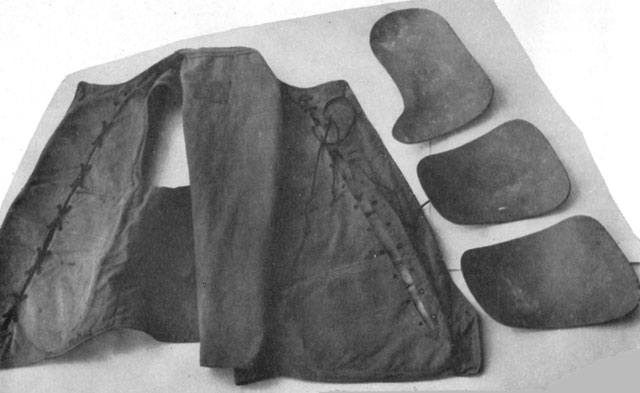
A Japanese vest, which used overlapping armour plates

In 1940, the Medical Research Council in Britain proposed the use of a lightweight suit of armour for general use by infantry, and a heavier suit for troops in more dangerous positions, such as anti-aircraft and naval gun crews. By February 1941, trials had begun on body armour made of mangalloy plates. Two plates covered the front area and one plate on the lower back protected the kidneys and other vital organs. Five thousand sets were made and evaluated to almost unanimous approval – as well as providing adequate protection, the armour didn't severely impede the mobility of the soldier and were reasonably comfortable to wear. The armor was introduced in 1942 although the demand for it was later scaled down. In northwestern Europe, The 2nd Canadian Division during World War II also adopted this armour for medical personnel.

The British company Wilkinson Sword began to produce flak jackets for bomber crews in 1943 under contract with the Royal Air Force. The majority of pilot deaths in the air were due to low-velocity fragments rather than bullets. The Surgeon General of the United States Air Force, Colonel M. C. Grow, who was stationed in Britain, thought that many wounds he was treating could have been prevented by some kind of light armor. Two types of armor were issued for different specifications. These jackets were made of nylon and were capable of stopping flak and fragmentation but were not designed to stop bullets. Flak jackets were also quickly adopted by the United States Army Air Forces.

In the early stages of World War II, the United States also designed body armor for infantrymen, but most models were too heavy and mobility-restricting to be useful in the field and incompatible with existing required equipment. Near the middle of 1944, development of infantry body armor in the United States restarted. Several vests were produced for the US military, including but not limited to the T34, the T39, the T62E1, and the M12. The United States developed a vest using doron plate, a fiberglass-based fibre-reinforced plastic. These vests were first used in the Battle of Okinawa in 1945.

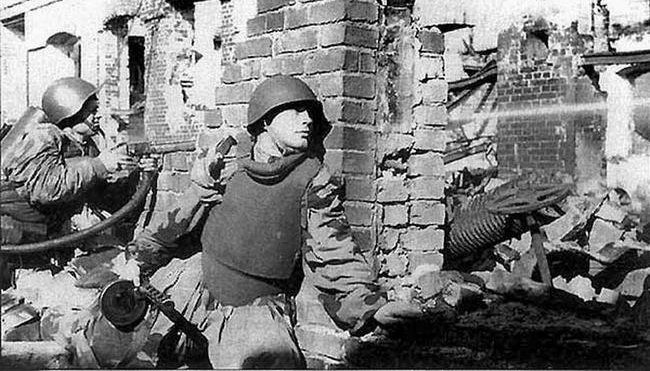
Sn-42 Body Armor, c. 1942

The Soviet Armed Forces used several types of body armour, including the SN-42 (from Stalnoi Nagrudnik, Russian for "steel breastplate" and the number denotes the design year). All were tested, but only the SN-42 was put in production. It consisted of two pressed steel plates that protected the front torso and groin. The plates were 2 mm thick and weighed 3.5 kg (7.7 lb). This armour was generally supplied to assault engineers (SHISBr) and tank desantniki. The SN armour effectively protected wearers from 9×19mm bullets fired by an MP 40 submachine gun at around 100 m (110 yd) and was sometimes able to deflect 7.92 Mauser rifle bullets and bayonet blades, although only at very low angles. This made it useful in urban battles such as the Battle of Stalingrad. However, the SN-42's weight made it impractical for infantry in the open. Some apocryphal accounts note point blank deflection of 9mm bullets, and testing of similar armour supports this theory.

=== Postwar ===
During the Korean War several new vests were produced for the United States military, including the M-1951, which made use of fibre-reinforced plastic or aluminium segments woven into a nylon vest. These vests represented "a vast improvement on weight, but the armor failed to stop bullets and fragments very successfully," although officially they were claimed to be able to stop 7.62×25mm Tokarev pistol rounds at the muzzle. Such vests equipped with Doron Plate have defeated .45 ACP handgun ammunition in informal testing. Developed by Natick Laboratories (now the Combat Capabilities Development Command Soldier Center) and introduced in 1967, T65-2 plate carriers were the first vests designed to hold hard ceramic plates, making them capable of stopping 7 mm rifle rounds.

These "Chicken Plates" were made of either boron carbide, silicon carbide, or aluminium oxide. They were issued to the crew of low-flying aircraft such as the UH-1 and UC-123 during the Vietnam War.

Conscious of US developments during the Korean War, the Soviet Union also began the development of body armour for its troops, resulting in the adoption of the 6b1 vest in 1957. This marked a shift away from previous systems like the SN-42, which relied on large, monolithic plates that were inflexible and substantially affected a soldier's balance. The 6b1, and all subsequent Soviet body armour, would rely upon ballistic-fabric wrapped plates, initially steel and later titanium and boron carbide. Between 1957 and 1958, anywhere between 1500 and 5000 6b1 vests were produced, but they were subsequently put in storage and not issued until the early years of the Soviet–Afghan War, where they were used in limited quantities, and were able to resist shrapnel and Tokarev rounds.

In 1969 the company American Body Armor was founded and began to produce a patented combination of quilted nylon faced with multiple steel plates. This armor configuration was marketed to American law enforcement agencies by Smith & Wesson under the trade name "Barrier Vest." The Barrier Vest was the first police vest to gain wide use during high-threat police operations.

In 1971, research chemist Stephanie Kwolek discovered a liquid crystalline polymer solution. Its exceptional strength and stiffness led to the invention of Kevlar, a synthetic fibre, woven into a fabric and layered, that, by weight, has five times the tensile strength of steel. In the mid-1970s, DuPont, the company which employed Kwolek, introduced Kevlar. Immediately Kevlar was incorporated into a National Institute of Justice (NIJ) evaluation program to provide lightweight, able body armour to a test pool of American law enforcement officers to ascertain if everyday able wearing was possible. Lester Shubin, a program manager at the NIJ, managed this law enforcement feasibility study within a few selected large police agencies and quickly determined that Kevlar body armor could be comfortably worn by police daily, and would save lives.

In 1975 Richard A. Armellino, founder of American Body Armor, marketed an all Kevlar vest called the K-15, consisting of 15 layers of Kevlar that also included a 5" × 8" ballistic steel "Shok Plate" positioned vertically over the heart and was issued US Patent #3,971,072 for this innovation. Similarly sized and positioned "trauma plates" are still used today on most vests, reducing blunt trauma and increasing ballistic protection in the center-mass heart/sternum area.

In 1976, Richard Davis, founder of Second Chance Body Armor, designed the company's first all-Kevlar vest, the Model Y. The lightweight, able vest industry was launched and a new form of daily protection for the modern police officer was quickly adopted. By the mid-to-late 1980s, an estimated 1/3 to 1/2 of police patrol officers wore able vests daily. By 2006, more than 2,000 documented police vest "saves" were recorded, validating the success and efficiency of lightweight able body armor as a standard piece of everyday police equipment.

=== Recent years ===
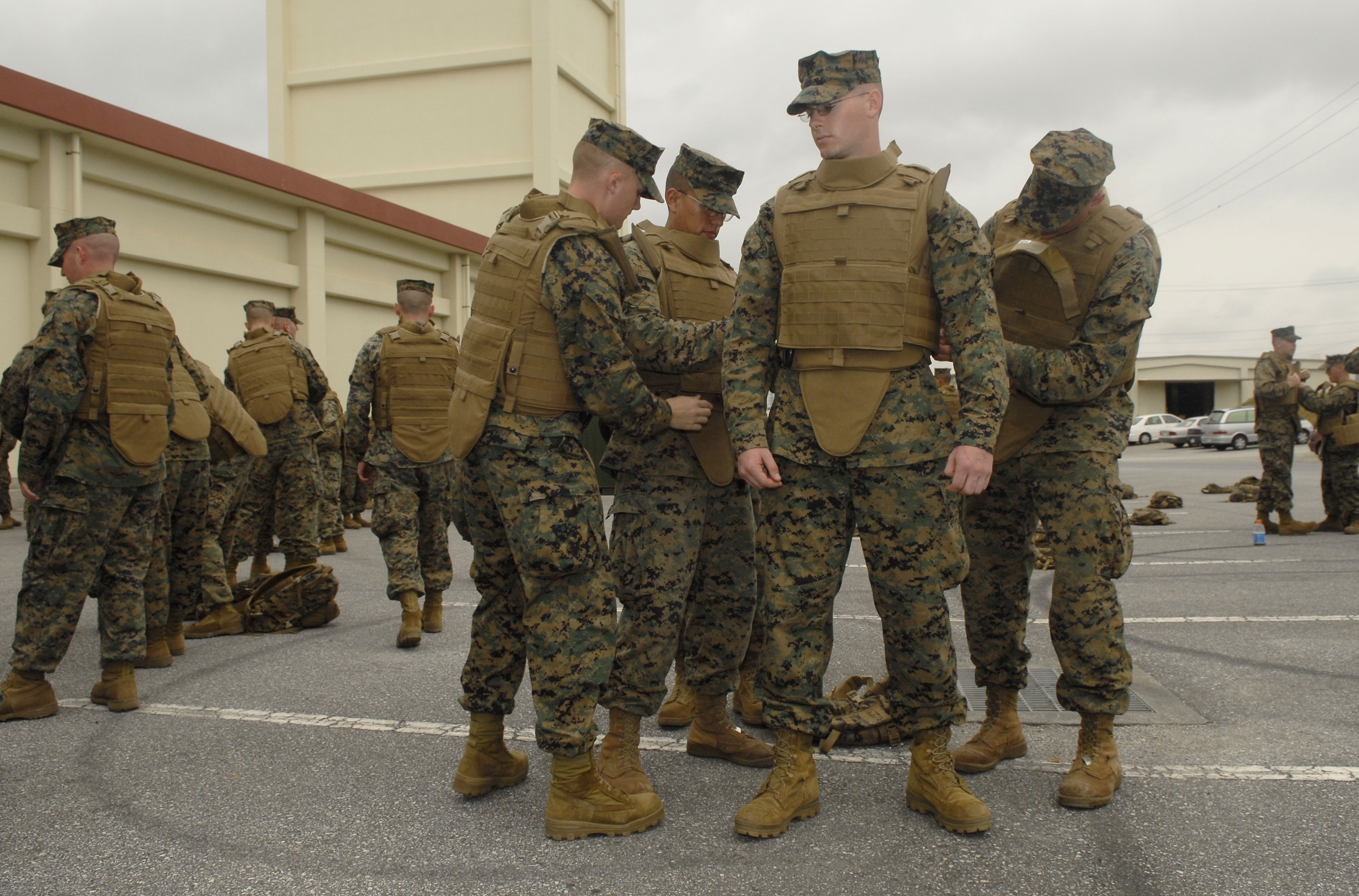
US Marines being issued the MTV at Camp Foster, Okinawa, Japan

During the 1980s, the US military issued the PASGT kevlar vest, tested privately at NIJ level IIA by several sources, able to stop pistol rounds (including 9 mm FMJ), but intended and approved only for fragmentation. West Germany issued a similar rated vest called the Splitterschutzweste.

During the early 1980s, body armor vests began to see widespread use by several countries in addition to more prolific users like the US and UK. Following the 1982 Israeli intervention during the Lebanese Civil War, body armor was widely issued to Israeli troops as well as European peacekeepers and to a lesser degree, by Syrian troops. During the Soviet-Afghan war the obsolete 6b1 was rapidly replaced by the 6b2, which was issued from 1980 onward and by 1983 was issued to the vast majority of the 40th army.

Kevlar soft armor had its shortcomings because if "large fragments or high velocity bullets hit the vest, the energy could cause life-threatening, blunt trauma injuries" in selected, vital areas. Ranger Body Armor was developed for the American military in 1991. Although it was the second modern US body armor that was able to stop rifle caliber rounds and still be light enough to be worn by infantry soldiers in the field, (first being the ISAPO, or Interim Small Arms Protective Overvest,) it still had its flaws: "it was still heavier than the concurrently issued PASGT (Personal Armor System for Ground Troops) anti-fragmentation armor worn by regular infantry and ... did not have the same degree of ballistic protection around the neck and shoulders." The format of Ranger Body Armor (and more recent body armor issued to US special operations units) highlights the trade-offs between force protection and mobility that modern body armor forces organizations to address.

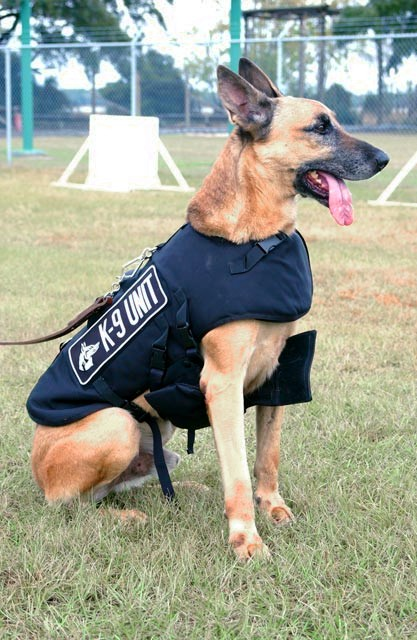
Bulletproof vest with Belgian Malinois as K-9 unit

Newer armor issued by the United States armed forces to large numbers of troops includes the Modular Scalable Vest (MSV) used by the United States Army and United States Air Force, as well as the United States Marine Corps' Modular Tactical Vest (MTV) and Scalable Plate Carrier (SPC). All of these systems are designed with the vest intended to provide protection from fragments and pistol rounds. Hard ceramic plates, such as the Small Arms Protective Insert, as used with Interceptor Body Armor, are worn to protect the vital organs from higher level threats. These threats mostly take the form of high velocity and armor-piercing rifle rounds. Similar types of protective equipment have been adopted by modern armed forces over the world.

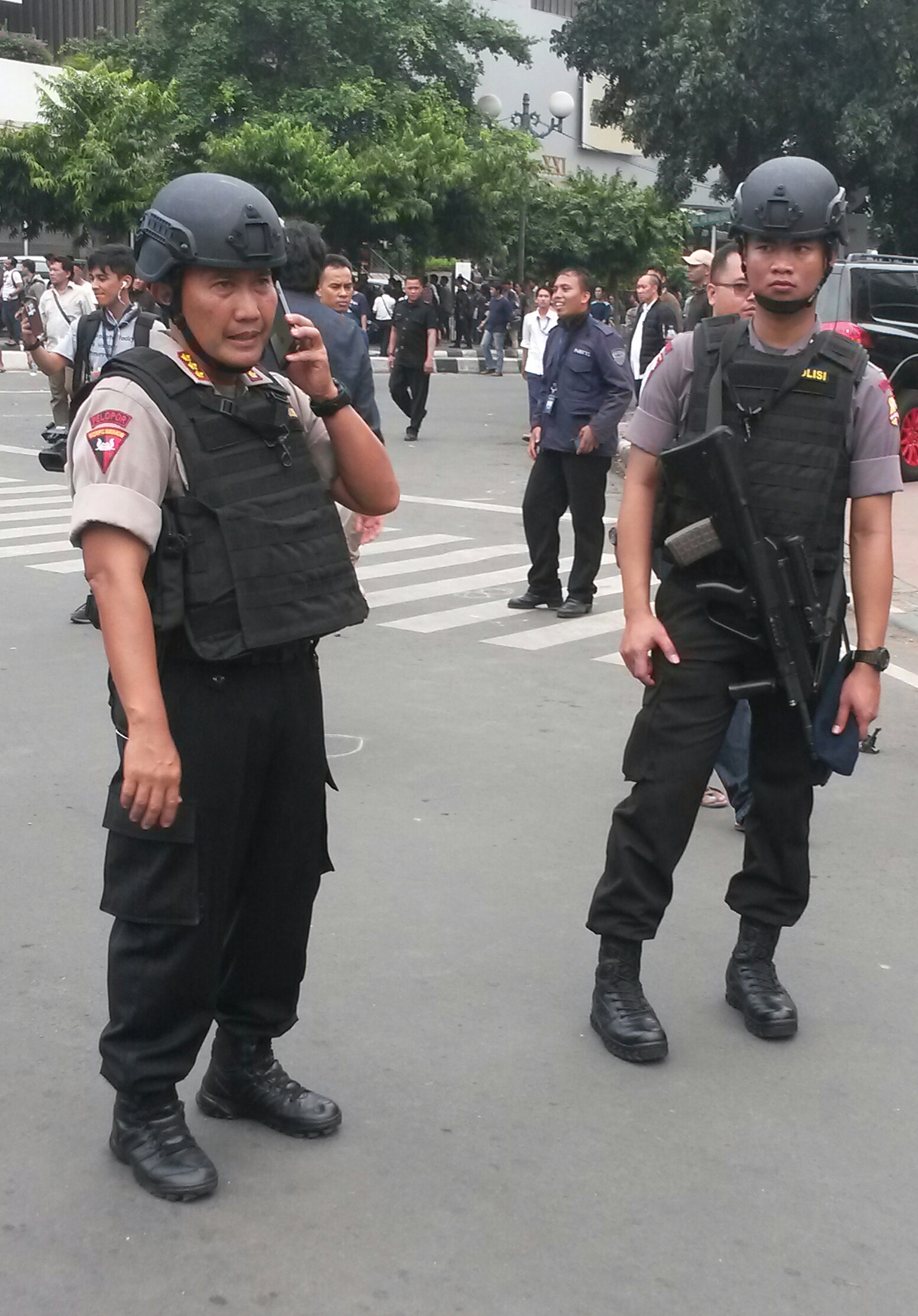
Indonesian Special Police "Brimob" personnel and an officer (left) with bulletproof vests in Jakarta during the 2016 Jakarta attacks

Since the 1970s, several new fibers and construction methods for bulletproof fabric have been developed besides woven Kevlar, such as DSM's Dyneema, Honeywell's Gold Flex and Spectra, Teijin Aramid's Twaron, Pinnacle Armor's Dragon Skin, and Toyobo's Zylon. The US military has developed body armor for the working dogs who aid soldiers in battle.

== Performance standards ==
Due to the various types of projectile, it is often inaccurate to refer to a particular product as "bulletproof" because this implies that it will protect against any and all threats. Instead, the term bullet resistant is generally preferred. Vest specifications will typically include both penetration resistance requirements and limits on the amount of impact force that is delivered to the body. Even without penetration, heavy bullets can deal enough force to cause blunt force trauma under the impact point. On the other hand, some bullets can penetrate the vest, but deal low damage to its wearer due to the loss of speed or small/reduced mass/form. Armour piercing ammunition tends to have poor terminal ballistics due to it being specifically not intended to fragment or expand.

Body armor standards are regional. Around the world ammunition varies and as a result the armor testing must reflect the threats found locally. Law enforcement statistics show that many shootings where officers are injured or killed involve the officer's own weapon. As a result, each law enforcement agency or para-military organization will have their own standard for armor performance if only to ensure that their armor protects them from their own weapons.

While many standards exist, a few standards are widely used as models. The US National Institute of Justice ballistic and stab documents are examples of broadly accepted standards. In addition to the NIJ, the UK Home Office Scientific Development Branch (HOSDB – formerly the Police Scientific Development Branch (PSDB)) and VPAM (German acronym for the Association of Laboratories for Bullet Resistant Materials And Constructions), originally from Germany, are other widely accepted standards. In the Russian area, the GOST standard is dominant.

== Soft and hard armor ==
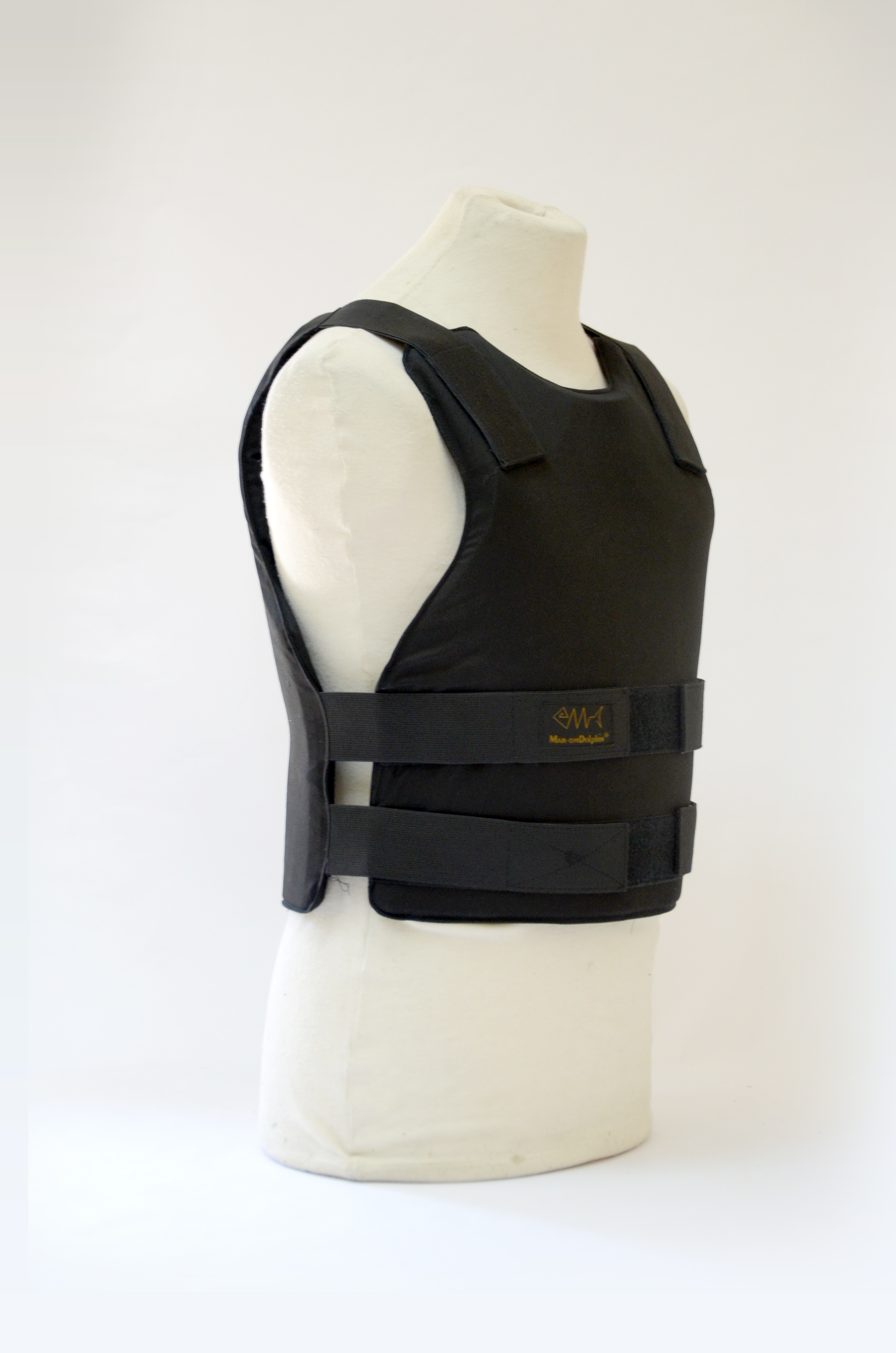
A level IIIA soft armor low-profile vest

Modern body armor is generally split into one of two categories: soft armor and hard armor. Soft armor is typically made of woven fabrics, like Dyneema or Kevlar, and usually provides protection against fragmentation and handgun threats. Hard armor usually refers to ballistic plates; these hardened plates are designed to defend against rifle threats, in addition to the threats covered by soft armor.

=== Soft armor ===
Soft armour is usually made of woven fabrics (synthetic or natural) and protects up to NIJ level IIIA. Soft armour can be worn stand-alone or can be combined with hard armor as part of an "In-Conjunction" armor system. In these in-conjunction systems, a soft armor "plate backer" is usually placed behind the ballistic plate and the combination of soft and hard armor provides the designated level of protection.

=== Hard armor ===
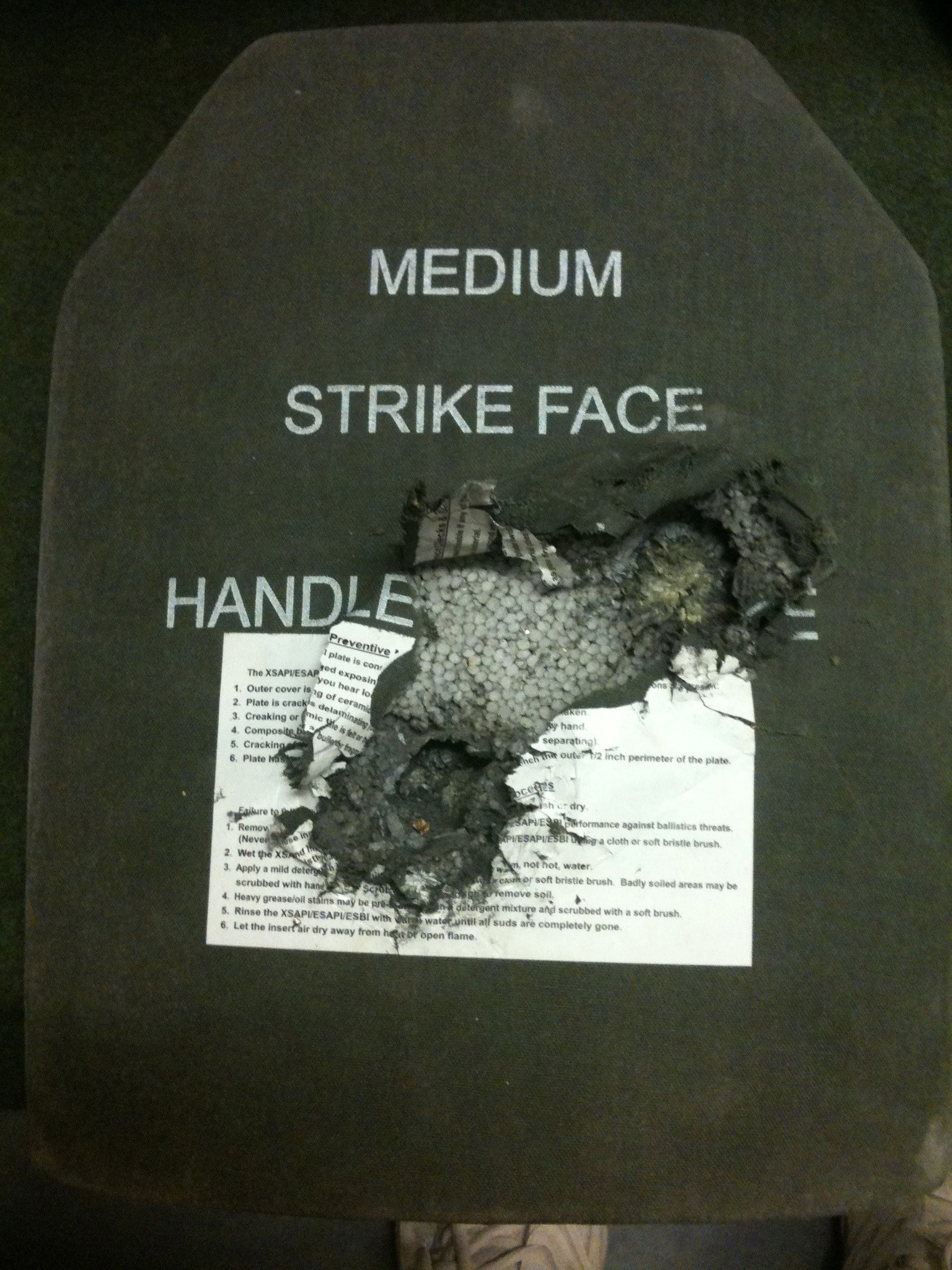
An ESAPI plate with battle damage following two bullet strikes. The wearer survived the incident thanks to the plate and was later invited to take receipt of its damaged section.

Broadly, there are three basic types of hard armor ballistic plates: ceramic plate-based systems, steel plate with spall fragmentation protective coating (or backer), and hard fiber-based laminate systems. These hard armor plates may be designed to be used stand-alone or "In-Conjunction" with soft armor backers, also called "plate backers".

Many systems contain both hard ceramic components and laminated textile materials used together. Various ceramic materials types are in use, however: aluminum oxide, boron carbide and silicon carbide are the most common. The fibers used in these systems are the same as found in soft textile armor. However, for rifle protection, high pressure lamination of ultra high molecular weight polyethylene with a Kraton matrix is the most common.

The Small Arms Protective Insert (SAPI) and the enhanced SAPI plate for the United States Department of Defense generally has this form. Due to the use of ceramic plates for rifle protection, these vests are 5–8 times as heavy on an area basis as handgun protection. The weight and stiffness of rifle armor is a major technical challenge. Density, hardness and impact toughness are among the materials properties that are balanced to design these systems. While ceramic materials have some outstanding properties for ballistics, they have poor fracture toughness. Failure of ceramic plates by cracking must also be controlled. For this reason many ceramic rifle plates are a composite. The strike face is ceramic with the backface formed of laminated fiber and resin materials. The hardness of the ceramic prevents the penetration of the bullet while the tensile strength of the fiber backing helps prevent tensile failure. The U.S. military's Small Arms Protective Insert family is a well-known example of these plates.

When a ceramic plate is shot, it cracks in the vicinity of the impact, which reduces the protection in this area. Although NIJ 0101.06 requires a Level III plate to stop six rounds of 7.62×51mm M80 ball ammunition, it imposes a minimum distance between shots of 2.0 inches (51mm); if two rounds impact the plate closer than this requirement permits, it may result in a penetration. To counter this, some plates, such as the Ceradyne Model AA4 and IMP/ACT (Improved Multi-hit Performance/Advanced Composite Technology) series, use a stainless steel crack arrestor embedded between the strike face and backer. This layer contains cracks in the strike face to the immediate area around an impact, resulting in markedly improved multi-hit ability; in conjunction with NIJ IIIA soft armor, a 3.9 lb IMP/ACT plate can stop eight rounds of 5.56×45mm M995, and a 4.2 lb plate such as the MH3 CQB can stop either ten rounds of 5.56×45mm M995 or six rounds of 7.62×39mm BZ API.

The standards for armor-piercing rifle bullets are not clear-cut, because the penetration of a bullet depends on the hardness of the target armor, and the armor type. However, there are a few general rules. For example, bullets with a soft lead-core and copper jacket are too easily deformed to penetrate hard materials, whereas rifle bullets intended for maximum penetration into hard armor are nearly always manufactured with high-hardness core materials such as tungsten carbide. Most other core materials would have effects between lead and tungsten carbide. Many common bullets, such as the 7.62×39mm M43 standard cartridge for the AK-47/AKM rifle, have a steel core with hardness rating ranging from Rc35 mild steel up to Rc45 medium hard steel. However, there is a caveat to this rule: with regards to penetration, the hardness of a bullet's core is significantly less important than the sectional density of that bullet. This is why there are many more bullets made with tungsten instead of tungsten carbide.

Additionally, as the hardness of the bullet core increases, so must the amount of ceramic plating used to stop penetration. Like in soft ballistics, a minimum ceramic material hardness of the bullet core is required to damage their respective hard core materials, however in armor-piercing rounds the bullet core is eroded rather than deformed.

The US Department of Defense uses several hard armor plates. The first, the Small Arms Protective Insert (SAPI), called for ceramic composite plates with a mass of 20–30 kg/m^{2} (4–5 lb/ft^{2}). SAPI plates have a black fabric cover with the text "7.62mm M80 Ball Protection"; as expected, they are required to stop three rounds of 7.62×51mm M80 ball, with the plate tilted thirty degrees towards the shooter for the third shot; this practice is common for all three-hit-protective plates in the SAPI series. Later, the Enhanced SAPI (ESAPI) specification was developed to protect from more penetrative ammunition. ESAPI ceramic plates have a green fabric cover with the text "7.62mm APM2 Protection" on the back and a density of 35–45 kg/m^{2} (7–9 lb/ft^{2}); they are designed to stop bullets like the .30-06 AP (M2) with a hardened steel core. Depending on revision, the plate may stop more than one. Since the issuance of CO/PD 04-19D on January 14, 2007, ESAPI plates are required to stop three rounds of M2AP. The plates may be differentiated by the text "REV." on the back, followed by a letter. A few years after the fielding of the ESAPI, the Department of Defense began to issue XSAPI plates in response to a perceived threat of AP projectiles in Iraq and Afghanistan. Over 120,000 inserts were procured; however, the AP threats they were meant to stop never materialized, and the plates were put into storage. XSAPI plates are required to stop three rounds of either the 7.62×51mm M993 or 5.56×45mm M995 tungsten-carbide armor-piercing projectiles (like newer ESAPIs, the third shot occurs with the plate tilted towards the shooter), and are distinguished by a tan cover with the text "7.62mm AP/WC Protection" on the back.

Cercom (now BAE Systems), CoorsTek, Ceradyne, TenCate Advanced Composites, Honeywell, DSM, Pinnacle Armor and a number of other engineering companies develop and manufacture the materials for composite ceramic rifle armor.

Body armor standards in the Russian Federation, as established in GOST R 50744–95, differ significantly from American standards, on account of a different security situation. The 7.62×25mm Tokarev round is a relatively common threat in Russia and is known to be able to penetrate NIJ IIIA soft armor. Armor protection in the face of the large numbers of these rounds, therefore, necessitates higher standards. GOST armor standards are more stringent than those of the NIJ with regards to protection and blunt impact.

For example, one of the highest protection level, GOST 6A, requires the armor to withstand three 7.62×54mmR B32 API hits fired from 5.10m away with 16mm of back-face deformation (BFD). NIJ Level IV-rated armor is only required to stop 1 hit of .30–06, or 7.62×63mm, M2AP with 44mm BFD.

=== Trauma plates ===
Trauma plates, also called trauma pads, are inserts or pads which are placed behind ballistic armour plates/panels and serve to reduce the blunt force trauma absorbed by the body; they do not necessarily have any ballistic protective properties. While an armour system (hard or soft) may stop a projectile from penetrating, the projectile may still cause significant indentation and deformation of the armour, also called backface deformation. Trauma plates help protect against damage to the body from this backface deformation. Trauma plates should not be confused with soft armor or with ballistic plates, both of which do inherently provide ballistic protection.

== Explosive protection ==
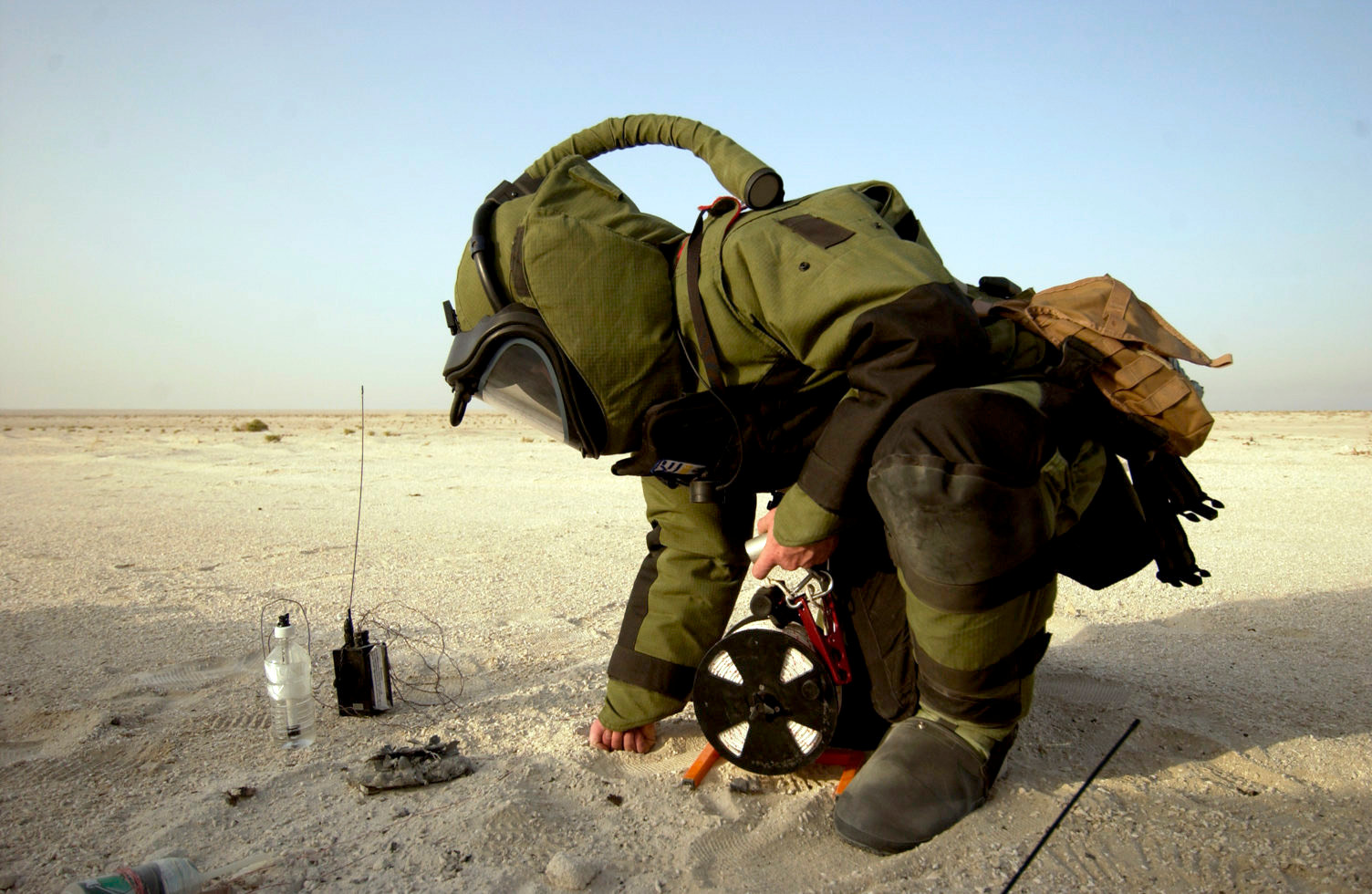
Bomb suit being used in a training exercise

Bomb disposal officers often wear heavy armor designed to protect against most effects of a moderate sized explosion, such as bombs encountered in terror threats. Full head helmet, covering the face and some degree of protection for limbs is mandatory in addition to very strong armor for the torso. An insert to protect the spine is usually applied to the back, in case an explosion throws the wearer. Visibility and mobility of the wearer is severely limited, as is the time that can be spent working on the device. Armor designed primarily to counter explosives is often somewhat less effective against bullets than armor designed for that purpose. The sheer mass of most bomb disposal armor usually provides some protection, and bullet-specific armor plates are compatible with some bomb disposal suits. Bomb disposal technicians try to accomplish their task if possible using remote methods (e.g., robots, line and pulleys). Actually laying hands on a bomb is only done in an extremely life-threatening situation, where the hazards to people and critical structures cannot be lessened by using wheeled robots or other techniques.

It is notable that despite the protection offered, much of it is in fragmentation. According to some sources, overpressure from ordnance beyond the charge of a typical hand grenade can overwhelm a bomb suit.

In some media, an EOD suit is portrayed as a heavily armoured bulletproof suit capable of ignoring explosions and gunfire; in real life, this is not the case, as much of a bomb suit is made up of only soft armor.

== Stab and stab-ballistic armor ==
=== Early "ice pick" test ===
In the mid-1980s the state of California Department of Corrections issued a requirement for a body armor using a commercial ice pick as the test penetrator. The test method attempted to simulate the capacity of a human attacker to deliver impact energy with their upper body. As was later shown by the work of the former British PSDB, this test overstated the capacity of human attackers. The test used a drop mass or sabot that carried the ice pick. Using gravitational force, the height of the drop mass above the vest was proportional to the impact energy. This test specified 109 joules (81 ft·lb) of energy and a 7.3 kg (16 lb) drop mass with a drop height of 153 cm (60 in).

The ice pick has a 4 mm (0.16 in) diameter with a sharp tip with a 5.4 m/s (17 ft/s) terminal velocity in the test. The California standard did not include knife or cutting-edge weapons in the test protocol. The test method used the oil/clay (Roma Plastilena) tissue simulant as a test backing. In this early phase only titanium and steel plate offerings were successful in addressing this requirement. Point Blank developed the first ice pick certified offerings for CA Department of Corrections in shaped titanium sheet metal. Vests of this type are still in service in US corrections facilities as of 2008.

Beginning in the early 1990s, an optional test method was approved by California which permitted the use of 10% ballistic gelatin as a replacement for Roma clay. The transition from hard, dense clay-based Roma to soft low-density gelatin allowed all textile solutions to meet this attack energy requirement. Soon all textile "ice pick" vests began to be adopted by California and other US states as a result of this migration in the test methods. It is important for users to understand that the smooth, round tip of the ice pick does not cut fiber on impact and this permits the use of textile based vests for this application.

The earliest of these "all" fabric vests designed to address this ice pick test was Warwick Mills's TurtleSkin ultra tightly woven para-aramid fabric with a patent filed in 1993. Shortly after the TurtleSkin work, in 1995 DuPont patented a medium density fabric that was designated as Kevlar Correctional. These textile materials do not have equal performance with cutting-edge threats and these certifications were only with ice pick and were not tested with knives.

=== HOSDB-Stab and Slash standards ===
Parallel to the US development of "ice pick" vests, the British police, PSDB, was working on standards for knife-resistant body armor. Their program adopted a rigorous scientific approach and collected data on human attack capacity. Their ergonomic study suggested three levels of threat: 25, 35 and 45 joules of impact energy. In addition to impact energy attack, velocities were measured and were found to be 10–20 m/s (much faster than the California test). Two commercial knives were selected for use in this PSDB test method. In order to test at a representative velocity, an air cannon method was developed to propel the knife and sabot at the vest target using compressed air. In this first version, the PSDB '93 test also used oil/clay materials as the tissue simulant backing. The introduction of knives which cut fiber and a hard-dense test backing required stab vest manufacturers to use metallic components in their vest designs to address this more rigorous standard. The current standard HOSDB Body Armour Standards for UK Police (2007) Part 3: Knife and Spike Resistance is harmonized with the US NIJ OO15 standard, use a drop test method and use a composite foam backing as a tissue simulant. Both the HOSDB and the NIJ test now specify engineered blades, double-edged S1 and single-edge P1 as well as the spike.

In addition to the stab standards, HOSDB has developed a standard for slash resistance (2006). This standard, like the stab standards, is based on drop testing with a test knife in a mounting of controlled mass. The slash test uses the Stanley Utility knife or box cutter blades. The slash standard tests the cut resistance of the armor panel parallel to the direction of blade travel. The test equipment measures the force at the instant the blade tip produces a sustained slash through the vest. The criteria require that slash failure of the armor be greater than 80 newtons of force.

=== Combination stab and ballistic vests ===
Vests that combined stab and ballistic protection were a significant innovation in the 1990s period of vest development. The starting point for this development were the ballistic-only offerings of that time using NIJ Level 2A, 2, and 3A or HOSDB HG 1 and 2, with compliant ballistic vest products being manufactured with areal densities of between 5.5 and 6 kg/m^{2} (1.1 and 1.2 lb/ft^{2} or 18 and 20 oz/ft^{2}). However police forces were evaluating their "street threats" and requiring vests with both knife and ballistic protection. This multi-threat approach is common in the United Kingdom and other European countries and is less popular in the USA. Unfortunately for multi-threat users, the metallic array and chainmail systems that were necessary to defeat the test blades offered little ballistic performance. The multi-threat vests have areal densities close to the sum of the two solutions separately. These vests have mass values in the 7.5–8.5 kg/m^{2} (1.55–1.75 lb/ft^{2}) range. Ref (NIJ and HOSDB certification listings). Rolls-Royce Composites -Megit and Highmark produced metallic array systems to address this HOSDB standard. These designs were used extensively by the London Metropolitan Police Service and other agencies in the United Kingdom.

=== Standards update US and UK ===
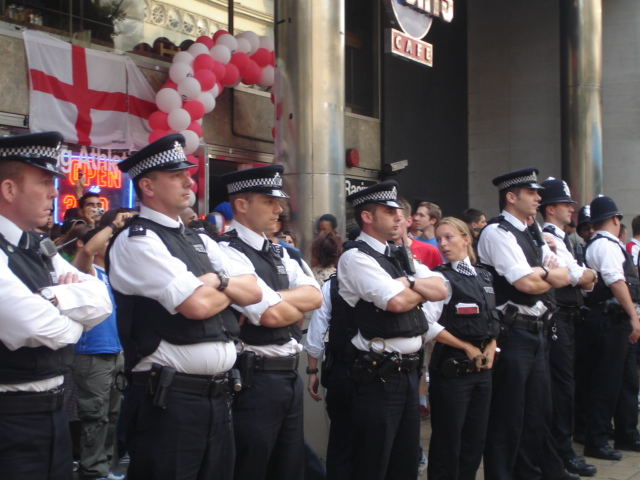
Metropolitan Police officers conducting crowd control, 2006

As vest manufacturers and the specifying authorities worked with these standards, the UK and US Standards teams began a collaboration on test methods. A number of issues with the first versions of the tests needed to be addressed. The use of commercial knives with inconsistent sharpness and tip shape created problems with test consistency. As a result, two new "engineered blades" were designed that could be manufactured to have reproducible penetrating behavior. The tissue simulants, Roma clay and gelatin, were either unrepresentative of tissue or not practical for the test operators. A composite-foam and hard-rubber test backing was developed as an alternative to address these issues. The drop test method was selected as the baseline for the updated standard over the air cannon option. The drop mass was reduced from the "ice pick test" and a wrist-like soft linkage was engineered into the penetrator-sabot to create a more realistic test impact. These closely related standards were first issued in 2003 as HOSDB 2003 and NIJ 0015. (The Police Scientific Development Branch (PSDB) was renamed the Home Office Scientific Development Branch in 2004.)

=== Stab and spike vests ===
These new standards created a focus on Level 1 at 25 joules (18 ft⋅lbf), Level 2 at 35 J (26 ft⋅lbf), Level 3 at 45 J (33 ft⋅lbf) protection as tested with the new engineered knives defined in these test documents. The lowest level of this requirement at 25 joules was addressed by a series of textile products of both wovens, coated wovens and laminated woven materials. All of these materials were based on Para-aramid fiber. The co-efficient of friction for ultra high molecular weight polyethylene (UHMWPE) prevented its use in this application. The TurtleSkin DiamondCoat and Twaron SRM products addressed this requirement using a combination of Para-Aramid wovens and bonded ceramic grain. These ceramic-coated products do not have the flexibility and softness of un-coated textile materials.

For the higher levels of protection L2 and L3, the very aggressive penetration of the small, thin P1 blade has resulted in the continued use of metallic components in stab armor. In Germany, Mehler Vario Systems developed hybrid vests of woven para-aramid and chainmail, and their solution was selected by London's Metropolitan Police Service. Another German company BSST, in cooperation with Warwick Mills, has developed a system to meet the ballistic-stab requirement using Dyneema laminate and an advanced metallic-array system, TurtleSkin MFA. This system is currently implemented in the Netherlands. The trend in multi threat armor continues with requirements for needle protection in the Draft ISO prEN ISO 14876 norm. In many countries there is also an interest to combine military style explosive fragmentation protection with bullet-ballistics and stab requirements.

== Armor carriers ==
In order for ballistic protection to be wearable, the ballistic panels and/or hard rifle-resistant plates are placed within a carrier. The term "plate carrier" is used specifically to refer to armour carriers which can hold ballistic plates. Broadly, there are two major types of carriers: overt carriers, and low-profile carriers which are meant to be concealed:

=== Overt/Tactical carriers ===
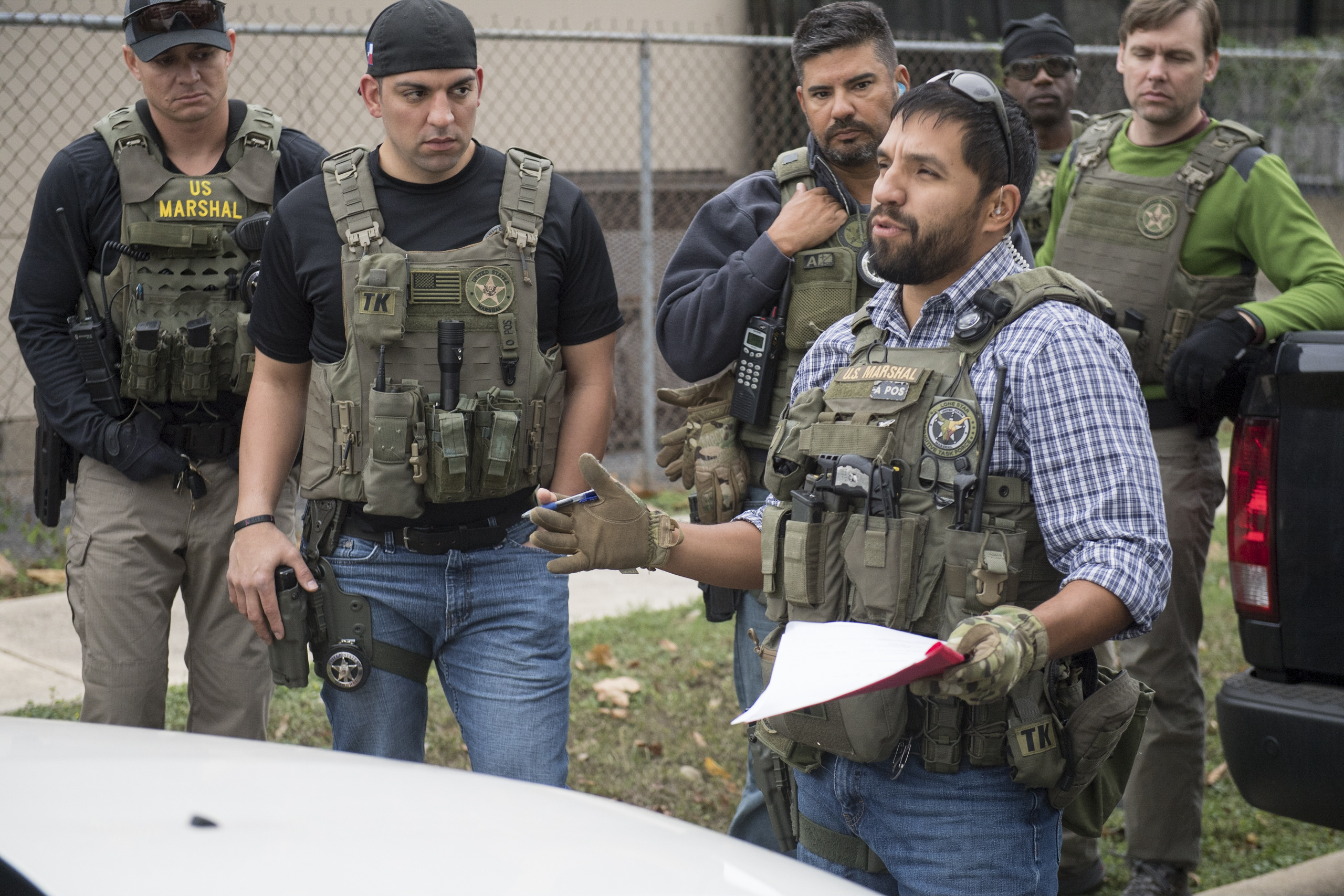
US Marshals wearing tactical plate carriers

Overt/Tactical armour carriers typically include pouches and/or mounting systems, like MOLLE, for carrying gear and are usually designed to provide higher amounts of protection. The Improved Outer Tactical Vest and Soldier Plate Carrier Systems are examples of military carriers design to be used with ballistic plate inserts.

In addition to load carriage, this type of carrier may include pockets for neck protection, side plates, groin plates, and backside protection. As this style of carrier is not close fitting, sizing in this system is straightforward for both men and women, making custom fabrication unnecessary.

=== Low-profile/concealable carriers ===
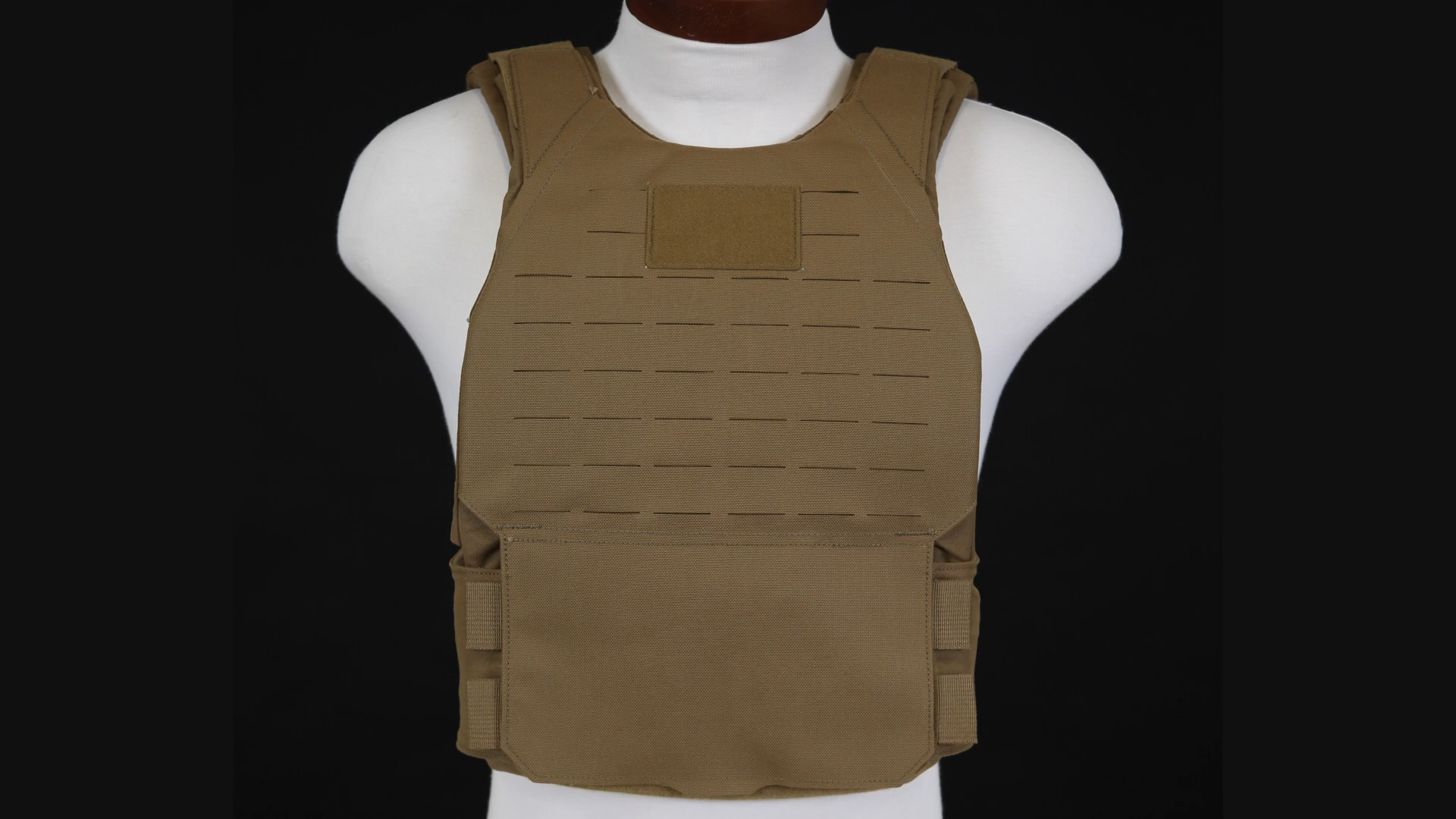
The low-profile configuration of the Plate Carrier Generation III

Low profile/concealable carriers holds the ballistic panels and/or ballistic plates close to the wearer's body and a uniform shirt may be worn over the carrier. This type of carrier must be designed to conform closely to the officer's body shape. For concealable armor to conform to the body it must be correctly fitted to a particular individual. Many programs specify full custom measurement and manufacturing of armor panels and carriers to ensure good fit and comfortable armor. Officers who are female or significantly overweight have more difficulty in getting accurately measured and having comfortable armor fabricated.

=== Vest slips ===
A third textile layer is often found between the carrier and the ballistic components. The ballistic panels are covered in a coated pouch or slip. This slip provides the encapsulation of the ballistic materials. Slips are manufactured in two types: heat sealed hermetic slips and simple sewn slips. For some ballistic fibers such as Kevlar the slip is a critical part of the system. The slip prevents moisture from the user's body from saturating the ballistic materials. This protection from moisture cycling increases the useful life of the armor.

== Research ==
=== Non-standard designs of hard armour ===
The vast majority of hard body armor plates, including the U.S. military's Small Arms Protective Insert family, are monolithic; their strike faces consist of a single ceramic tile. Monolithic plates are lighter than their non-monolithic counterparts, but suffer from reduced effectiveness when shot multiple times in a close area (i.e., shots spaced less than two inches/5.1 cm apart). However, several non-monolithic armor systems have emerged, the most well-known being the controversial Dragon Skin system. Dragon Skin, composed of dozens of overlapping ceramic scales, promised superior multi-hit performance and flexibility compared to the then-current ESAPI plate; however, it failed to deliver. When the U.S. Army tested the system against the same requirements as the ESAPI, Dragon Skin showed major issues with environmental damage; the scales would come apart when subjected to temperatures above 120 °F (49 °C) – not uncommon in Middle Eastern climates – when exposed to diesel vehicle fuel, or after the two four-foot drop tests (after these drops, ESAPI plates are put in an X-ray machine to determine the location of cracks, and then shot directly on said cracks), leaving the plate unable to reach its stated threat level and suffering 13 first- or second-shot complete penetrations by .30–06 M2 AP (the ESAPI test threat) out of 48 shots.

Perhaps less-well known is LIBA (Light Improved Body Armor), manufactured by Royal TenCate, ARES Protection, and Mofet Etzion in the early 2000s. LIBA uses an innovative array of ceramic pellets embedded in a polyethylene backer; although this layout lacks the flexibility of Dragon Skin, it provides impressive multi-hit ability as well as the unique ability to repair the armor by replacing damaged pellets and epoxying them over. In addition, there are variants of LIBA with multi-hit capacity against threats analogous to 7.62×51mm NATO M993 AP/WC, a tungsten-cored armor-piercing round. Field tests of LIBA have yielded successful results, with 15 AKM hits producing only minor bruises.

=== Progress in material science ===
Ballistic vests use layers of very strong fibers to "catch" and deform a bullet, mushrooming it into a dish shape, and spreading its force over a larger portion of the vest fiber. The vest absorbs the energy from the deforming bullet, bringing it to a stop before it can completely penetrate the textile matrix. Some layers may be penetrated but as the bullet deforms, the energy is absorbed by a larger and larger fiber area.

In recent years, advances in material science have opened the door to the idea of a literal "bulletproof vest" able to stop handgun and rifle bullets with a soft textile vest, without the assistance of additional metal or ceramic plating. However, progress is moving at a slower rate compared to other technical disciplines. The most recent offering from Kevlar, Protera, was released in 1996. Current soft body armor can stop most handgun rounds (which has been the case for roughly 15 years), but armor plates are needed to stop rifle rounds and steel-core handgun rounds such as 7.62×25mm. The para-aramids have not progressed beyond the limit of 23 grams per denier in fiber tenacity.

Modest ballistic performance improvements have been made by new producers of this fiber type. Much the same can be said for the UHMWPE material; the basic fiber properties have only advanced to the 30–35 g/d range. Improvements in this material have been seen in the development of cross-plied non-woven laminate, e.g. Spectra Shield. The major ballistic performance advance of fiber PBO is known as a "cautionary tale" in materials science. This fiber permitted the design of handgun soft armor that was 30–50% lower in mass as compared to the aramid and UHMWPE materials. However this higher tenacity was delivered with a well-publicized weakness in environmental durability.

Akzo-Magellan (now DuPont) teams have been working on fiber called M5 fiber; however, its announced startup of its pilot plant has been delayed more than 2 years. Data suggests if the M5 material can be brought to market, its performance will be roughly equivalent to PBO. In May 2008, the Teijin Aramid group announced a "super-fibers" development program. The Teijin emphasis appears to be on computational chemistry to define a solution to high tenacity without environmental weakness.

The materials science of second generation "super" fibers is complex, requires large investments, and represent significant technical challenges. Research aims to develop artificial spider silk which could be super strong, yet light and flexible. Other research has been done to harness nanotechnology to help create super-strong fibers that could be used in future bulletproof vests. In 2018, the US military began conducting research into the feasibility of using artificial silk as body armor, which has the advantages of its light weight and its cooling capability.

=== Textile wovens and laminates research ===
Finer yarns and lighter woven fabrics have been a key factor in improving ballistic results. The cost of ballistic fibers increases dramatically as the yarn size decreases, so it's unclear how long this trend can continue. The current practical limit of fiber size is 200 denier with most wovens limited at the 400 denier level. Three-dimensional weaving with fibers connecting flat wovens together into a 3D system are being considered for both hard and soft ballistics. Team Engineering Inc is designing and weaving these multi layer materials. Dyneema DSM has developed higher performance laminates using a new, higher strength fiber designated SB61, and HB51. DSM feels this advanced material provides some improved performance, however the SB61 "soft ballistic" version has been recalled. At the Shot Show in 2008, a unique composite of interlocking steel plates and soft UHWMPE plate was exhibited by TurtleSkin. In combination with more traditional woven fabrics and laminates a number of research efforts are working with ballistic felts. Tex Tech has been working on these materials. Like the 3D weaving, Tex Tech sees the advantage in the 3-axis fiber orientation.

=== Fibers used ===
Ballistic nylon (until the 1970s) or Kevlar, Twaron or Spectra (a competitor for Kevlar) or polyethylene fiber could be used to manufacture bullet proof vests. The vests of the time were made of ballistic nylon & supplemented by plates of fiber-glass, steel, ceramic, titanium, Doron & composites of ceramic and fiberglass, the last being the most effective.

=== Developments in ceramic armor ===
Ceramic materials, materials processing and progress in ceramic penetration mechanics are significant areas of academic and industrial activity. This combined field of ceramics armor research is broad and is perhaps summarized best by The American Ceramics Society. ACerS has run an annual armor conference for a number of years and compiled a proceedings 2004–2007. An area of special activity pertaining to vests is the emerging use of small ceramic components. Large torso sized ceramic plates are complex to manufacture and are subject to cracking in use. Monolithic plates also have limited multi hit capacity as a result of their large impact fracture zone. These are the motivations for new types of armor plate. These new designs use two- and three-dimensional arrays of ceramic elements that can be rigid, flexible, or semi-flexible. Dragon Skin body armor is one of these systems. European developments in spherical and hexagonal arrays have resulted in products that have some flex and multi hit performance. The manufacture of array type systems with flex, consistent ballistic performance at edges of ceramic elements is an active area of research. In addition advanced ceramic processing techniques arrays require adhesive assembly methods. One novel approach is use of hook and loop fasteners to assemble the ceramic arrays.

=== Nanomaterials in ballistics ===
Currently, there are a number of methods by which nanomaterials are being implemented into body armor production. The first, developed at University of Delaware is based on nanoparticles within the suit that become rigid enough to protect the wearer as soon as a kinetic energy threshold is surpassed. These coatings have been described as shear thickening fluids. These nano-infused fabrics have been licensed by BAE systems, but as of mid-2008, no products have been released based on this technology.

In 2005 an Israeli company, ApNano, developed a material that was always rigid. It was announced that this nanocomposite based on tungsten disulfide nanotubes was able to withstand shocks generated by a steel projectile traveling at velocities of up to 1.5 km/s. The material was also reportedly able to withstand shock pressures generated by other impacts of up to 250 metric tons-force per square centimeter (24.5 gigapascals; 3,550,000 psi). During the tests, the material proved to be so strong that after the impact the samples remained essentially unmarred. Additionally, a study in France tested the material under isostatic pressure and found it to be stable up to at least 350 tf/cm^{2} (34 GPa; 5,000,000 psi).

=== Graphene composite ===
In late 2014, researchers began studying and testing graphene as a material for use in body armor. Graphene is manufactured from carbon and is the thinnest, strongest, and most conductive material on the planet. Taking the form of hexagonally arranged atoms, its tensile strength is known to be 200 times greater than steel, but studies from Rice University have revealed it is also 10 times better than steel at dissipating energy, an ability that had previously not been thoroughly explored. To test its properties, the University of Massachusetts stacked together graphene sheets only a single carbon atom thick, creating layers ranging in thickness from 10 nanometers to 100 nanometers from 300 layers. Microscopic spherical silica "bullets" were fired at the sheets at speeds of up to 3 km (1.9 mi) per second, almost nine times the speed of sound. Upon impact, the projectiles deformed into a cone shape around the graphene before ultimately breaking through. In the three nanoseconds it held together however, the transferred energy traveled through the material at a speed of 22.2 km (13.8 mi) per second, faster than any other known material. If the impact stress can be spread out over a large enough area that the cone moves out at an appreciable velocity compared with the velocity of the projectile, stress will not be localized under where it hit. Although a wide impact hole opened up, a composite mixture of graphene and other materials could be made to create a new, revolutionary armor solution.

== Legality ==
Country or region	Ownership without license	Ref.
Argentina	Illegal	
Australia	Varies internally	
Brazil	Legal	
Canada	Varies internally	
European Union	Legal	
India	Legal	
Japan	Legal	
New Zealand	Legal	
Thailand	Illegal	Up to five years in prison
United Kingdom	Legal	
United States	Varies internally	

=== Australia ===
In Australia, it is illegal to import body armour without prior permission from the Australian Border Force. It is also illegal to possess body armour without authorization in South Australia, Victoria, Northern Territory, ACT, Queensland, New South Wales, and Tasmania. Western Australia does not have any prohibition on body armour possession.

=== Canada ===
In all Canadian provinces except for Alberta, British Columbia and Manitoba, it is legal to wear and to purchase body armour such as ballistic vests. Under the laws of these provinces, it is illegal to possess body armour without a license (unless exempted) issued by the provincial government.

As of February 2019, Nova Scotia allows "only those who require such armour due to their employment" to keep and use body armor, such as police and corrections officers, citing the use of body armor by criminals.

According to the Body Armour Control Act of Alberta which came into force on June 15, 2012, any individual in possession of a valid firearms licence under the Firearms Act of Canada can legally purchase, possess and wear body armour.

=== European Union ===
Bullet-resistant police vest for women with breast shaping in size S – Protection class SK 1 and Level IIIA – Police in Bavaria

In the European Union, the Firearms Directive contains no prohibitions or restrictions on body armor. There are many shops in the EU that sell ballistic vests and body armor, used or new.

In Italy, the purchase, ownership and wear of ballistic vests and body armor is not subject to any restriction, except for those ballistic protections that are developed under strict military specifications and/or for main military usage, thus considered by the law as "armament materials" and forbidden to civilians. Furthermore, a number of laws and court rulings during the years have rehearsed the concept of a ballistic vest being mandatory to wear for those individuals who work in the private security sector.

In the Netherlands the civilian ownership of body armour is not illegal. Body armour in various ballistic grades is sold by a range of different vendors, mainly aimed at providing to security guards and VIP's. The use of body armour while committing a crime is not an additional offence in itself, but may be interpreted as so under different laws such as resisting arrest.

=== Hong Kong ===
Under Schedule 1 (item ML13) of Cap. 60G Import and Export (Strategic Commodities) Regulations, body armor is not regulated "when accompanying their user for the user's own personal protection".

=== United States ===
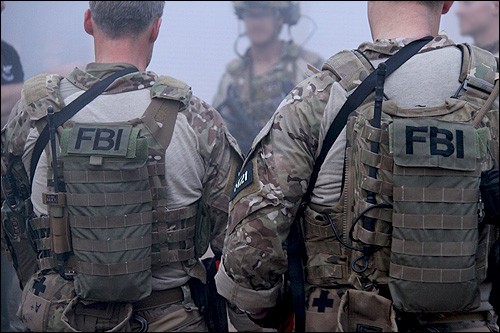
Hostage Rescue Team agents

United States federal law restricts possession of body armor for convicted violent felons. There is no minimum age nor is there a licensure requirement to possess body armor under federal law. Some states also prohibit possession or use of body armor by persons convicted of certain crimes other than violent felonies, for instance, Texas prohibits possession of body armor by persons convicted of any felony.

Connecticut and Wisconsin additionally prohibit persons adjudicated as a delinquent juvenile for certain offenses from possessing body armor, and Wisconsin also applies this to persons found not guilty by reason of insanity for certain offenses.

Most states and federal law do not have restrictions on body armor possession based on factors other than a criminal conviction.

In California, persons who, for a reason other than being a minor, are prohibited from possessing firearms under state law are also prohibited from possessing body armor.

Baltimore City heavily restricts and Chicago generally prohibits possession of body armor.

Louisiana prohibits wearing body armor on or within 1,000 feet of the property of educational institutions, unless an exception applies.

New York State restricts body armor possession to "eligible professions" determined by the New York State Department of State. In 2026, Judge John Sinatra of the United States District Court for the Western District of New York ruled that this restriction is unconstitutional, and that body armor is protected by the Second Amendment to the United States Constitution. This injunction is stayed while the state appeals the ruling to the Second Circuit Court of Appeals.

In Kentucky, probation or parole is denied to a person convicted of committing certain crimes while wearing body armor and carrying a deadly weapon.

Certain states, as well as the United States Sentencing Guidelines for federal cases, impose additional penalties for using body armor while committing certain crimes. In Florida, this includes murder, sexual battery, robbery, burglary, arson, aggravated assault, aggravated battery, kidnapping, escape, breaking and entering with intent to commit a felony, criminal gang-related offenses, controlled substance offenses, and aircraft piracy.

== See also ==
- Brigandine
- Buff coat
- Dyneema
- Flak jacket
- Hauberk
- Jack of plate
- Mail (armour)
- Terminal ballistics
