= Bacinol =

Bacinol may refer to:

- Bacinol, code name for secret Dutch penicillin research during WWII. See DSM (company)#History
- Bacinol, and Bacinol 2, names of buildings in Delft, The Netherlands. See Delft#Culture
