= Stalnoi Nagrudnik =

Soviet body armor

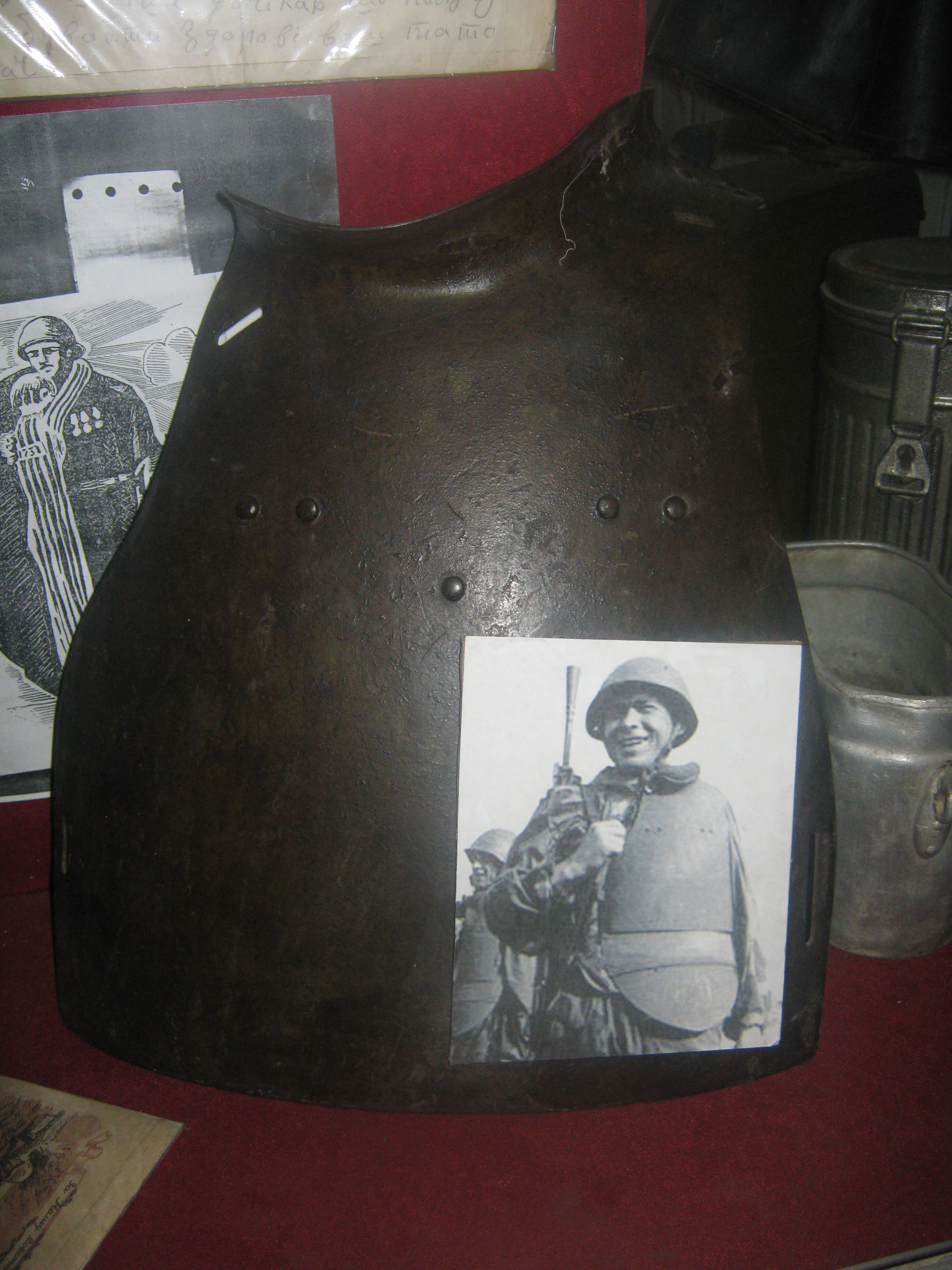
Steel breastplate, breastplate of steel in Kamianets-Podilskyi Castle museum.

Stalnoi Nagrudnik (Russian: Стальной нагрудник, lit. 'Steel breastplate') is a class of ballistic steel cuirass developed by the Red Army in World War II. It consisted of two pressed steel plates that protected the front torso and groin. The plates were 2 mm (0.079 in) and weighed 3.5 kg (7.7 lb). The abbreviation for the vest was "СН", the Cyrillic letters Es and En. This armor was supplied to the Assault Engineering Brigades (SHISBr).

== Models ==
Several models were created; the number indicates the year of development:

- SN-38
- SN-39
- SN-40, SN-40A
- SN-42, made of 2 mm steel 36SGN, the tolerances 1.8 to 2.2 mm (0.071 to 0.087 in), weight of Chest 3.3 to 3.5 mm (0.13 to 0.14 in). It protected an area measuring 0.2 m^{2} (2.2 sq ft).
- SN-46

The steel breastplates along with the conventional steel SSh-40 helmets equipped the assault engineers and demining brigades of the Supreme Command Reserve Stavka, for which they are sometimes called "tubular infantry." Breastplate SN-42 was designed to protect against bayonet attacks, small fragments of shrapnel, and 9mm pistol bullets with lead cores, providing protection against fire from an MP 40 submachine gun from close range, but were useless against rifle rounds such as 7.92×57mm Mauser. Following the adoption of the Wehrmacht on the supply of 9mm cartridges, the cartridge code R.08 mE (German: mit Eisenkern), with a bullet with mild steel (iron) core, required the thickness to be increased to 2.6 mm (0.10 in) for the chest plate (2.5 to 2.7 mm (0.098 to 0.106 in)). This redesign received the name SN-46.

By modern standards, they are roughly equivalent to a Class II vest.

- Soviet Union – steel breastplates SN-42 began to arrive in the army in 1942 and were later used during World War II.
- Poland – Soviet steel cuirass entered service of the 1st Polish Army (as of October 31, 1944 there were 1,000 pieces).
- Nazi Germany – by some accounts, captured Soviet steel breastplates came to supply the German Army; also Germany, in limited quantities (only for parts of the SS, mostly assault squads), produced similar breastplates.

Estimates of the plates' performance from front-line soldiers were mixed, receiving both positive and negative feedback. The vest worked well in street fighting and other types of close quarter combat. However, in the field where assault teams often had to crawl the breastplates were just an unnecessary burden.

== Similar design ==
- During World War I (1914-1918), steel cuirasses were mass-produced and were used by the armies of the German Empire (Sappenpanzer), Britain, France, and Italy where they were known as Corazze Farina from the name of the designer.
- In the 1920s-1930s, steel cuirasses were in service with the Polish police.
- In the 1920s-1930s, several types of steel cuirasses were developed for the soldiers of the Imperial Japanese Army, and were used during fighting in China.

== See also ==
- Ballistic vest
- Body armor § Performance standards
- List of personal protective equipment by body area

== Bibliography ==
- Bashford Dean: Helmets and Body Armor in Modern Warfare, Verlag READ BOOKS, 2008, S. 162–163, ISBN 978-1-4437-7524-3
