= Dragon Skin =

Ballistic vest

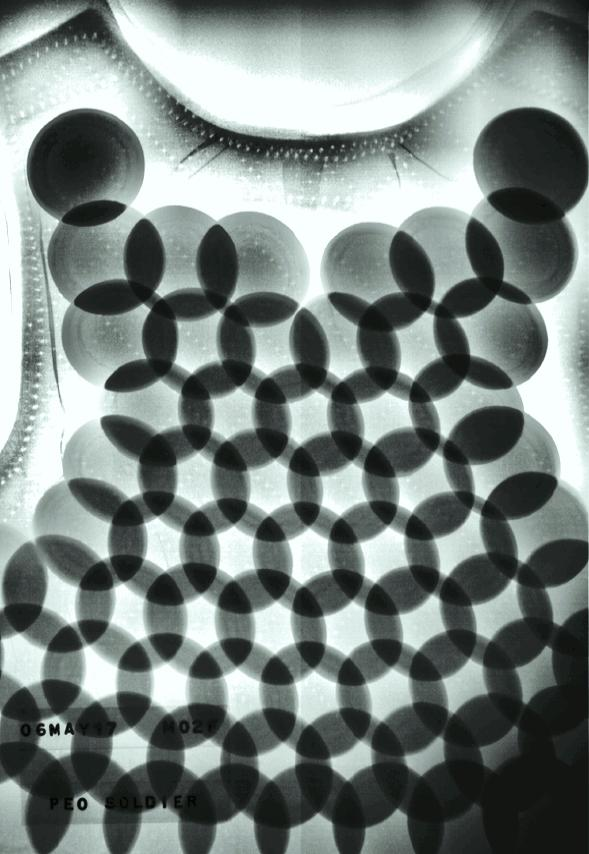
X-ray of Dragon Skin Body Armor

Dragon Skin is a type of ballistic vest first-produced by the now-defunct company Pinnacle Armor, and was subsequently manufactured by North American Development Group LLC. The vest manufacturer claimed that it could absorb a high number of bullets because of its unique design involving circular discs that overlapped, similar to scale armor.

The Department of Justice (DOJ), Office of Justice Programs (OJP) announced in 2007 that the armor did not comply with the OJP's National Institute of Justice (NIJ) 2005 Interim Requirements as a Level III armor system. This failure to comply with safety standards and additional testing led to the U.S. military to ban it from active use.

== Pinnacle Armor ==
Pinnacle Armor was a United States-based armor manufacturing company. It was founded in 2000 and was based in Fresno, California. Pinnacle acquired the patent rights to Dragon Skin from Armor Technology Corp in 2000. In addition to Dragon Skin body armor, they also produced reinforced materials for use on vehicles and buildings, along with related training materials. Pinnacle began producing Dragon Skin in the 2000s and the armor was available to military members, law enforcement, the Central Intelligence Agency (CIA), U.S. Secret Service personnel, and civilian contractors. Pinnacle filed for Chapter 11 bankruptcy on January 3, 2010.

== Structure ==
Dragon Skin armor is made of overlapping, two-inch wide high tensile strength ceramic discs, composed of silicon carbide ceramic matrices and laminates, that overlap like scale armor, encased in a fiberglass textile.

== Testing ==
=== Television and internet ===
In a test for the History Channel's military show, Future Weapons, the vest repelled nine rounds of steel-core ammunition from an AK-47 and 35 rounds of 9×19mm from a Heckler & Koch MP5A3, all fired into a 10 by 12 in (250 by 300 mm) area on the vest. On Test Lab, also on the History Channel, the vest withstood 120 rounds fired from a Type 56 (7.62×39mm) rifle and Heckler & Koch MP5 (9×19mm). In another demonstration on the Discovery Channel series Future Weapons, a Dragon Skin vest withstood numerous rounds (including steel core rounds) from an AK-47, a Heckler & Koch MP5SD, an M4 carbine (5.56×45mm), and a point-blank detonation of an M67 grenade. While the vest was heavily damaged (mainly by the grenade), there was no penetration of the armor.

In 2007, NBC News had independent ballistics testing conducted comparing Dragon Skin against Interceptor body armor. Retired four-star general Wayne A. Downing observed the tests and concluded that although the number of trials performed was limited, the Dragon Skin armor performed significantly better than Interceptor. It was also featured on Time Warp on the Discovery Channel.

NBC also interviewed retired USMC Colonel James Magee, who was a developer of the Army's then-current Interceptor body armor, stated "Dragon Skin is the best out there, hands down. It's better than the Interceptor. It is state of the art. In some cases, it's two steps ahead of anything I've ever seen."

The Defense Review website also published a positive article, noting that in their test and review of the Dragon Skin armor, they had found that it was "significantly superior in every combat-relevant way to U.S. Army PEO Soldier's and U.S. Army Natick Soldier Center (NSC)/Soldier Systems Center's Interceptor Body Armor".

In light of the May 2007 media investigations, senators Hillary Clinton and Jim Webb requested that Comptroller General of the United States David M. Walker initiate a Government Accountability Office investigation into the Army's body armor systems.

After being confronted with conflicting information by lawmakers who questioned the NBC test results and Army-supplied data of vest failures from a May 2006 test, the technical expert solicited by NBC to certify its test rescinded his previous support of Dragon Skin and stated that the vests "weren't ready for prime time."

=== Law enforcement ===
In Fresno, California, a police department commissioned the purchase of Dragon Skin for its officers after a vest stopped all the bullets fired during a test, including .308 rounds from a rifle and 30 rounds from a 9mm MP5 fired from five feet away. The armor also stopped 40 rounds of PS-M1943 mild steel-core bullets from an AK-47 along with 200 9mm full metal jacket bullets fired from a submachine gun.

=== Military testing ===
External image
- Official Army Test Results

Dragon Skin became the subject of controversy with the U.S. Army over testing it against its Interceptor body armor. The Army claimed Pinnacle's body armor was not proven effective. In test runs for the Air Force there were multiple failures to meet the claimed level of protection. This coupled with poor quality control (over 200 of the 380 vests delivered to USAF OSI were recalled due to improperly manufactured armor disks) and accusations of fraudulent claims of official NIJ rating (Pinnacle had not actually obtained the rating at the time of purchase) led to the termination of the USAF contract. Pinnacle attempted to appeal this decision, but courts found in favor of the USAF.

Dragon Skin armor did not meet military standards when subjected to various environmental conditions, including: high (150 °F (66 °C)) and low (−60 °F (−51 °C)) temperature, diesel fuel, oil, and saltwater immersion, and a 14 hour temperature cycle from −25 to 120 °F (−32 to 49 °C)). Military testing revealed that the epoxy glue that held its disc plates together would come undone at high temperatures, causing the discs to delaminate and accumulate in the lower portion of the armor panel. This exposed significant portions of the armor, resulting in Dragon Skin vests suffering 13 first or second shot complete penetrations.

On April 26, 2006 Pinnacle Armor issued a press release to address these claims and a product recall instigated by the United States Navy. The company stated that although vests were returned due to a manufacturing issue, a test on the Dragon Skin Level III armor was conducted by the United States Air Force Office of Special Investigations at Aberdeen Proving Ground in February 2006, which concluded that it "did not fail any written contract specifications" set forth by the Air Force, which was further said by Pinnacle to require high ballistic performance due to the hostile environments in which AFOSI operates.

The Pentagon stated that the test results were classified and neither side could agree to terms on another, more comprehensive test.

On May 19, 2006 it was announced that the dispute had been resolved and the vests were going to be retested again by the Army to clear the dispute. On May 20, 2006 it was announced by The Washington Post (and other newspapers) in an article titled "Potential Advance in Body Armor Fails Tests" that the Dragon Skin vests had failed the retest according to their anonymous source. Official results of these tests were classified at the time but have since been released by the Army.

On June 6, 2006, Karl Masters, director of engineering for Program Manager - Soldier Equipment, said he recently supervised the retest and commented on it. "I was recently tasked by the army to conduct the test of the 30 Dragon Skin SOV-3000 level IV body armor purchased for T&E [tests and evaluation]," Masters wrote. "My day job is acting product manager for Interceptor Body Armor. I'm under a gag order until the test results make it up the chain. I will, however, offer an enlightened and informed recommendation to anyone considering purchasing an SOV-3000 Dragon Skin—don't. I do not recommend this design for use in an AOR with a 7.62×54R AP threat and an ambient temperature that could range to 49°C (120 F). I do, however, highly recommend this system for use by insurgents..." In response to these claims, Pinnacle Armor released a press release on June 30, 2006.

According to the Army, the vests failed because the extreme temperature tests caused the discs to dislodge, thus rendering the vest ineffective. Pinnacle Armor affirms that their products can withstand environmental tests in accordance with military standards, as does testing by the Aberdeen Test Center.

In response to claims made by several U.S. senators, Dragon Skin and special interest groups, on Monday, May 21, 2007, the Army held a press conference where they released the results of the tests they claimed Dragon Skin failed.

In April 2008, one of the Dragon Skin vests, with a serial number that identifies it as one of 30 vests bought by the Department of Defense for U.S. Army for testing in 2006, was listed and later bought from eBay. The seller, David Bronson, allegedly was connected to a U.S. Army testing facility. The U.S. Government Accountability Office (GAO), the U.S. Department of Justice, and the F.B.I. began investigating the matter in May 2008. The buyer described the vest as having been shot at least 20 times, with not a single through-penetration.

== U.S. Army ban ==
On March 30, 2006 the Army banned all privately purchased commercial body armor in theater. Army officials said the ban order was prompted by concerns that soldiers or their families were buying inadequate or untested commercial armor from private companies. The Army ban refers specifically to Pinnacle's Dragon Skin armor saying that the company advertising implies that Dragon Skin "is superior in performance" to the Interceptor Body Armor the military issues to soldiers. The United States Marine Corps has not issued a similar directive, but Marines are "encouraged to wear Marine Corps-issued body armor since this armor has been tested to meet fleet standards." NBC News learned that well after the Army ban, select elite forces assigned to protect generals and VIPs in Iraq and Afghanistan wore Dragon Skin. General Peter W. Chiarelli made a statement that, "he never wore Dragon Skin but that some members of his staff did wear a lighter version of the banned armor on certain limited occasions, despite the Army ban."

H.P. White Labs conducted tests on Dragon Skin in May 2006. Even under normal external and atmospheric conditions, model SOV 3000 Dragon Skin failed to stop the second impact of M2AP. Then when the other tests were run, SOV 3000 failed multiple times, with the exception of the Salt Water test.

== Certification and subsequent decertification ==
In an interview with KSEE 24 News, an NBC affiliate, on November 14 and 16, 2006, Pinnacle Armor detailed the five-year process that the National Institute of Justice (NIJ) and Pinnacle went through to establish a test protocol and procedure for flexible rifle defeating armor, which it passed and then received certification.

On December 20, 2006, Pinnacle said that they received the official letter from the NIJ stating that they had passed the Level III tests, and that Dragon Skin SOV-2000 was now certified for Level III protection.

The Air Force, which ordered the Dragon Skin vests partially based on claims they were NIJ certified at a time when they were not, opened a criminal investigation into Pinnacle over allegations that it had fraudulently placed a label on their Dragon Skin armor improperly stating that it had been certified to a ballistic level. Murray Neal, the Pinnacle Armor chief executive, claimed that he was given verbal authorization by the NIJ to label the vests although he did not have written authorization.

On August 3, 2007, the Department of Justice announced that the NIJ had reviewed evidence provided by the body armor manufacturer and had determined that the evidence was insufficient to demonstrate that the armor model would maintain its ballistic performance over its six-year declared warranty period. Because of this, Dragon Skin was found to not be in compliance with the NIJ's testing program and was removed from the NIJ's list of bullet-resistant body armor models that satisfy its requirements. Pinnacle CEO Murray Neal responded that this move was unprecedented, political, and not about the quality of the vests, because the NIJ were not claiming failure of any ballistics tests. Neal stated that the finding was motivated by a dispute regarding a warranty issue instead, in which the warranty period of Dragon Skin is longer than that of most other commercial vests.

=== Subsequent testing ===
On August 20, 2007, at the United States Test Laboratory in Wichita, Kansas, nine Dragon Skin SOV-2000 (Level III) body armor panels were retested, for the purpose of validating Pinnacle Armor's six-year warranty. The panels tested were between 5.7 years old and 6.8 years old. All items met the NIJ Level III ballistic protection, confirming Pinnacle's six-year warranty for full ballistic protection. Pinnacle resubmitted the SOV-2000 vest to the NIJ for certification based on this successful testing, but this application was rejected because the test had not been properly documented. In November 2007, Pinnacle sued to force the NIJ to recertify the SOV-2000 vest; their case was found to be without merit and summarily dismissed in November 2013.
