= Lester Shubin =

American research chemist (1925–2009)

- Born: September 27, 1925; Philadelphia, Pennsylvania
- Died: November 20, 2009 (aged 84); Fairfax County, Virginia
- Spouse: Zelda Loigman Shubin

Lester D. Shubin (September 27, 1925 – November 20, 2009) was an American research chemist who developed Kevlar for the use in ballistic vests. Kevlar's use in ballistic vests was later expanded for use in all types of personal armor.

== Life ==
Shubin was born in Philadelphia, Pennsylvania, and graduated from South Philadelphia High School in 1943. He served in the U.S. Army within France and Germany during World War II. He was among the troops that liberated the Dachau concentration camp. "He didn't talk about it until the last few years," his son Harry Shubin said. "It completely changed his life. He didn't follow rules if they didn't make sense to him. And he'd explain his thinking to you, and by the time he was done, you agreed."

After the war, Shubin worked as a chemist and joined the U.S. Department of Justice in 1971.

Shubin worked for many years at the National Institute of Justice ("NIJ"), the federal agency designated with research and development in the field of law enforcement technology. At least one history of the development of police technology notes that in its first 20 years, "efforts in technology research and development were to a considerable degree a one-person effort, that person being Lester Shubin, a chemist."

In 1966, Stephanie Kwolek, a chemist working for E.I. DuPont de Nemours & Co., developed Kevlar; a strong, lightweight liquid polymer that can be spun into a fiber and woven into cloth. Kevlar was initially used as a replacement for steel-belting in tires, and later for use in ropes, gaskets, and automotive and aviation parts. In 1971, Shubin, who was then the Director of Science and Technology for the National Institute for Law Enforcement and Criminal Justice, suggested using Kevlar to replace nylon in bullet-proof vests. Prior to the introduction of Kevlar, flak jackets made of nylon had provided much more limited protection to users. Shubin later recalled how the idea developed: "We folded it over a couple of times and shot at it. The bullets didn't go through." In tests, they strapped Kevlar onto anesthetized goats and shot at their hearts, spinal cords, livers and lungs. They monitored the goats' heart rate and blood gas levels to check for lung injuries. After 24 horus, one goat died and the others had wounds that were not life threatening. Shubin received a $5 million grant to research the use of the fabric in bullet-proof vests.

In 1975, the federal government distributed 5,000 Kevlar vests to 15 police departments. In the first year of deployment, two police officers wearing the vests were shot with handguns and two others were attacked with knives. None of the assaulted officers suffered any serious injuries. The first instance of a Kevlar vest saving a police officer from a bullet occurred on December 23, 1975, when a Seattle police officer was shot in the chest during a grocery store robbery. Shubin later recalled: "He was shot from only three feet away and he didn't even fall down, so the guy shot him again. We rushed out to Seattle to see him. All he had under the vest was two mean looking bruises."

In the 30-plus years since Shubin introduced the Kevlar bullet-proof vest, the vests have been credited with saving the lives of more than 3,000 law enforcement officers in the US.

Shubin was also an early advocate of using bomb-sniffing dogs to find explosives. He recalled, "We learned that basically any dog could find explosives or drugs, even very small dogs like Chihuahuas, whose size could be an advantage. Who is going to look twice at someone in a fur coat carrying a dog? But that dog could smell a bomb as well as a German shepherd."

Shubin died of a heart attack on November 20, 2009, at the age of 84. Following Shubin's death, The Police News paid tribute to Shubin for the many lives he had saved through his development of the Kevlar vest:

"Many of us had the honor of meeting Lester D. Shubin during an event in Washington, DC. ... There are literally thousands of police officers alive today that can trace their survival back to Mr. Shubin's work. Please take a moment to remember the life of Lester D. Shubin, 1925 – 2009."
