= DSM-Firmenich =

Dutch multinational chemical company

DSM-Firmenich AG

- Office in Maastricht, the Netherlands
- Trade name: dsm-firmenich
- Traded as: Euronext Amsterdam: DSFIR; AEX component
- ISIN: CH1216478797
- Industry: Chemicals
- Predecessors: DSM; Firmenich
- Founded: 9 May 2023; 3 years ago
- Headquarters: Maastricht, Netherlands; Kaiseraugst, Switzerland
- Products: Nutritional ingredients, specialty food ingredients, UV filters, fragrances, flavourings, enzymes, human milk oligosaccharide
- Revenue: €12.799 billion (2024)
- Operating income: €2.118 billion (2024)
- Total assets: €33.7 billion (2024)
- Total equity: €22.5 billion (2024)
- Number of employees: ~ 30,000
- Website: dsm-firmenich.com

DSM-Firmenich AG (stylised as dsm-firmenich) is a Swiss-Dutch multinational chemical company. It was formed on 9 May 2023 through the merger of the Dutch Royal DSM and the Swiss company Firmenich. The company is listed on Euronext Amsterdam and is a constituent of the AEX index.

== History ==
The announcement of the merger between DSM and Firmenich was first made in 2022 with a goal of establishing a leading nutrition and personal care ingredients company. The merger was considered by both organisations to be a "merger of equals". The merger was completed on 9 May 2023.

On 30 May 2024, a new headquarters in Maastricht was officially opened by Queen Máxima of the Netherlands.

On 11 February 2025, Novonesis reached an agreement with the company to acquire its shares in the Feed Enzyme Alliance for €1.5 billion. The agreement would dissolve the Alliance and have Novonesis take over all sales and distribution activities.

== Activities ==
The company has over 300 locations in more than sixty countries.

Corporate activities are divided into three business units: Perfumery & Beauty; Health, Nutrition, and Care; and Taste, Texture & Health.

== See also ==
- DSM (company)
- Firmenich
