= Firmenich =

Swiss chemical company

Firmenich International SA
- Formerly: Chuit & Naef
- Type: Publicly listed company (as part of dsm-firmenich)
- Industry: Flavors, fragrances, ingredients
- Founded: 1895; 131 years ago
- Founders: Philippe Chuit; Martin Naef
- Defunct: 2023
- Fate: Merged with DSM
- Successor: dsm-firmenich
- Headquarters: Geneva, Switzerland
- Key people: Dimitri De Vreeze (dsm-firmenich CEO); Patrick Firmenich (Chairman)
- Revenue: CHF 4.3 billion (Fiscal Year 2021)
- Number of employees: 10,000 (2021)
- Website: www.firmenich.com

Firmenich SA was a Swiss company in the fragrance and flavor business. The company has created perfumes for over 125 years and produced a number of well-known flavors. Founded in 1895, it merged in May 2023 with the Dutch company DSM to form DSM-Firmenich.

It employed 10,000 people across 46 manufacturing plants and six research and development centers.

== History ==
The company was founded as Chuit & Naef in 1895 in Geneva by chemist Philippe Chuit and businessman Martin Naef. Fred Firmenich joined in 1900 and later became the majority partner. The company was renamed Firmenich SA.

Originally a fragrance company, Firmenich branched into the flavor business by creating a raspberry substitute in 1938, followed by creations of citrus and strawberry flavor. Other synthetic flavors followed for use in ultra-processed foods and preserved foods.

In 1939, Firmenich Director of Research and Development Lavoslav Ružička was awarded the Nobel Prize in Chemistry "for his work on polymethylenes and higher terpenes," "including the first chemical synthesis of male sex hormones."

On May 3, 2007, Firmenich announced that it would be acquiring the flavors' division of Danisco, Noville, in a deal worth € 450 million. The deal was expected to move Firmenich ahead of IFF as the second-largest flavor company in the world.

Firmenich's board named Gilbert Ghostine as CEO to succeed Patrick Firmenich, effective October 1, 2014. Patrick Firmenich was elected as chairman of Firmenich's Board of Directors as of October 12, 2016.

On July 11, 2017, Firmenich completed the acquisition of Agilex Fragrances, expanding its ability to serve mid-sized customers in North America.

On December 13, 2017, Firmenich announced the acquisition of Flavourome, an established privately held flavors company in South Africa, to expand its presence in Africa. On February 5, 2018, Firmenich confirmed the successful completion of the acquisition.

In August 2018, Firmenich acquired Campus, an innovator in the application of "natural functional ingredients for protein application", which specializes "in clean label, meat, dairy, sauces and plant-based food". The research and production facilities of Campus are located in Italy and Monterrey, Mexico.

In September 2018, Firmenich announced its intent to acquire Senomyx.

In June 2020, Firmenich acquired Les Dérivés Résiniques et Terpéniques ("DRT"), a world leader in plant-based chemistry, mainly from pine trees, and one of the leading suppliers globally of high quality, renewable ingredients.

In October 2020, Firmenich announced that it had created a flavour by means of artificial intelligence. It teamed with Microsoft who helped leverage "the entirety of Firmenich’s broad raw material database" to dissimulate "a lightly grilled beef taste" into its plant-based meat alternatives. Firmenich's "unique palette of ingredients" and "SmartProteins expertise in plant-based protein alternatives" were instrumental in the innovation process.

In 2021, Firmenich was ranked second on FoodTalks' Global Top 50 Food Flavours and Fragrances Companies list, below Givaudan and above International Flavors and Fragrances. Major competitors include Givaudan, IFF and Symrise.

In 2022, Firmenich announced its ambition to merge with Dutch conglomerate DSM; the merger became effective in May 2023 and the resulting company is named dsm-firmenich.

== Lobby groups ==
Firmenich is a member of the European Flavour Association.

In March 2021, Firmenich, Givaudan, IFF and Symrise launched the Fragrance Science and Advocacy Council.
