= Senomyx =

American biotechnology company

- Traded as: Nasdaq: SNMX
- Industry: Biotechnology
- Founded: 1998
- Founder: Lubert Stryer, Paul Nevsky
- Fate: Acquired by Firmenich
- Headquarters: San Diego, California, U.S.

Senomyx is an American biotechnology company that develops food additives. The company claims to have "reverse engineered" human taste and aroma receptors. It was founded by Lubert Stryer and Paul Nevsky in 1998. On September 17, 2018, private Swiss company Firmenich completed the acquisition of Senomyx.

== History ==
Biochemist Lubert Stryer founded Senomyx in 1998. In May 2001, Stryer returned to his professorship at Stanford University and resigned from Senomyx, but continued to be the Chairman of the Scientific Advisory Board.

Around the year 2001, Senomyx patented several flavor enhancers by using "proprietary taste receptor-based assay systems", which have been previously expressed in human cell culture, in HEK293 cells. HEK293 cells are a cell line widely used in biological and medical research, immortalized through a genetic modification removed from the original embryonic kidney cells in the early 1970s.

The company's stock declined after PepsiCo reversed a trial rollout of Senomyx ingredients in their sodas in 2016.

== Products ==
Senomyx's products work by amplifying the intensity of flavors. This is done by expressing taste receptors and measuring receptor signaling in response to additives. Because very small amounts of the additive are used (reportedly less than one part per million), Senomyx has no obligation to report their ingredients to the consumer. Senomyx products fall under the broad category of "artificial flavors". For the same reason, the company's chemicals have not undergone the FDA safety approval.

Senomyx's MSG-enhancer gained the generally recognized as safe (GRAS) status from the Flavor and Extract Manufacturers Association, an industry-funded organization. It received a positive review by the Joint FAO/WHO Expert Committee on Food Additives, which determined that there were no safety concerns with the use of the Company's savory flavor ingredients in foods. The positive assessment by JECFA is expected to expedite regulatory approvals in a number of countries, particularly those that do not have independent regulatory approval systems.

Based on the company's use of HEK293 cell lines, in 2011 the pro-life organization Children of God for Life issued an action alert calling for a boycott of companies that partnered with Senomyx. This led to a 2012 bill in the Oklahoma legislature, proposed by Ralph Shortey, that would have prohibited the "manufacture or sale of food or products which use aborted human fetuses".
