= Myeonje baegap =

Soft bulletproof vest invented during the Joseon

- Hangul: 면제배갑
- Hanja: 綿製背甲
- RR: myeonje baegap
- MR: myŏnje paegap

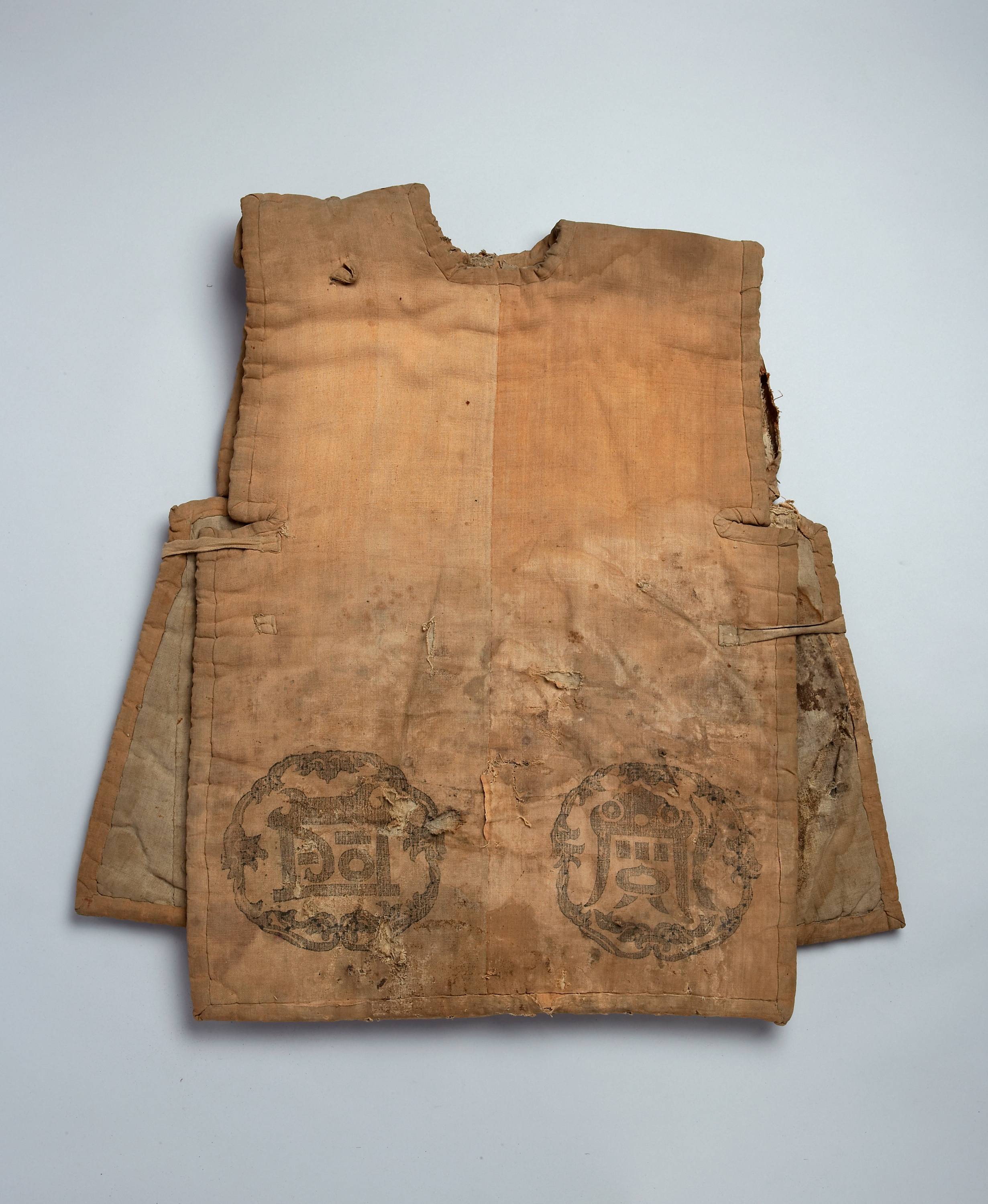
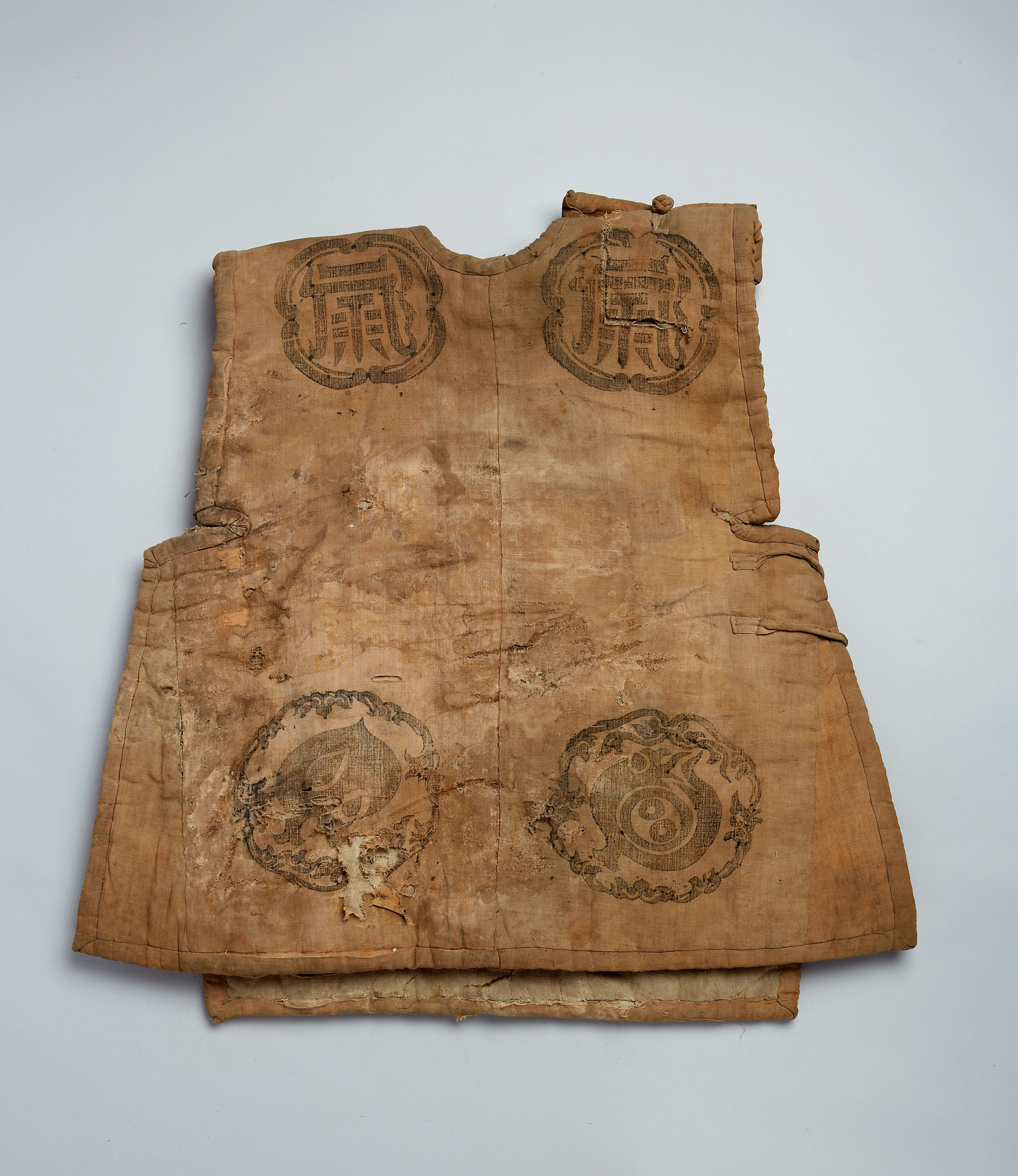

Myeonje baegap (Korean: 면제배갑; Hanja: 綿製背甲) was a soft bulletproof vest invented during the Joseon in 1867.

It was invented following the 1866 military French expedition to Korea and used in battle during the United States expedition to Korea in 1871. It was made of between 13 and 30 folds of cotton fabric and covered the upper torso.

== Background ==
During the French Campaign against Korea, the Joseon military, at the time using matchlocks, experienced the superiority of Western rifles. As a result, regent Heungseon Daewongun ordered the development of bulletproof armor.

The vests were distributed to soldiers after its creation, and were used in battles fought on Ganghwa Island against United States Navy and Marine forces during the 1871 United States expedition to Korea.

The US army captured one of the vests and took it to the US. The vest was stored in the Smithsonian until 2007. The vest has since been sent back to Korea and is currently on display to the public in the National Palace Museum of Korea.
