= DSM (company) =

Dutch multinational corporation

Royal DSM N.V.

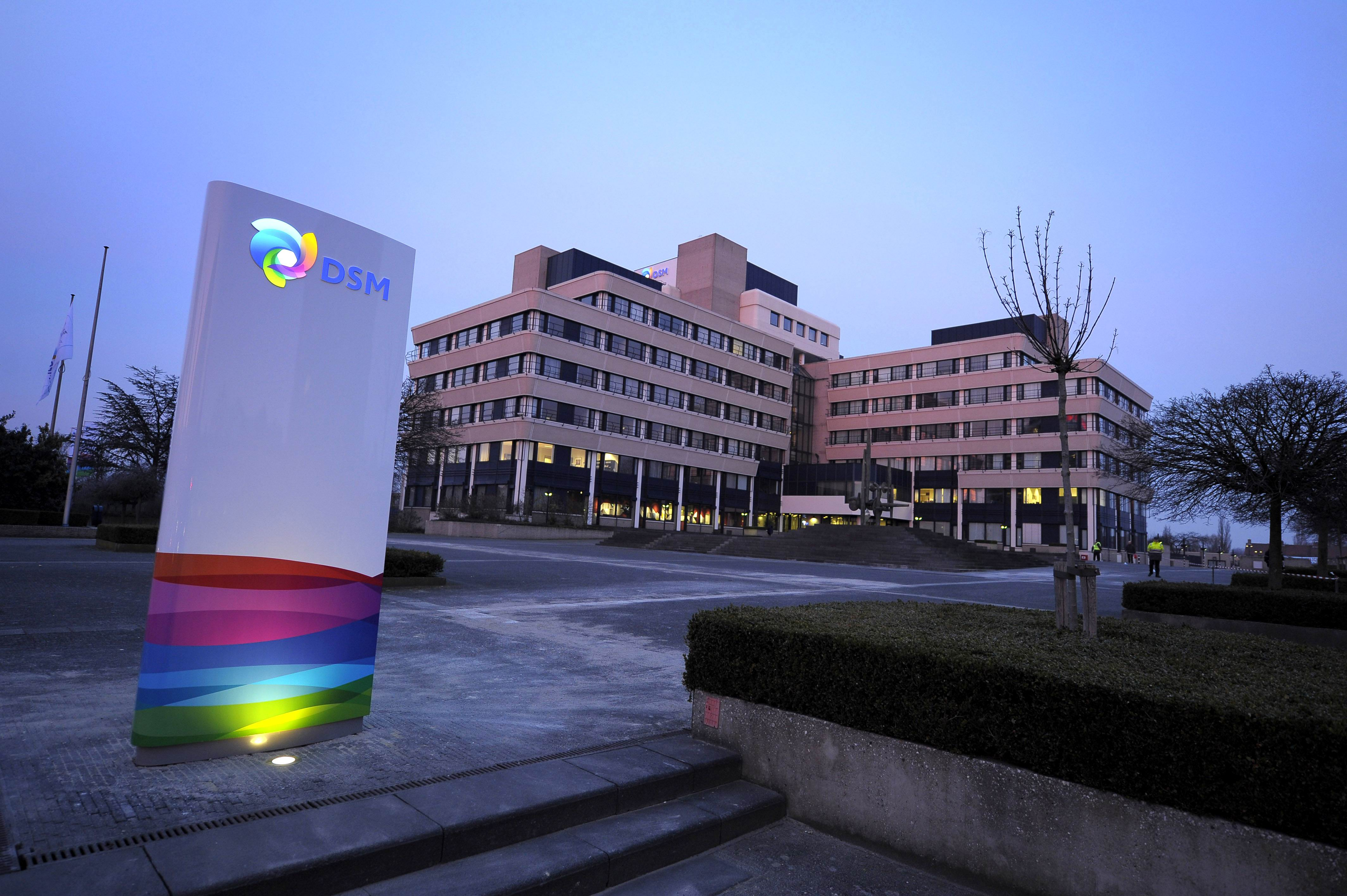
- Former DSM Headquarters in Heerlen (2011)
- Native name: Koninklijke DSM N.V.
- Company type: Naamloze vennootschap
- Traded as: Euronext Amsterdam: DSM; AEX component
- ISIN: NL0000009827
- Industry: Chemicals
- Founded: 1902; 124 years ago
- Headquarters: Maastricht, Netherlands
- Key people: Dimitri de Vreeze (co-CEO); Geraldine Matchett (co-CEO); Edith Schippers (President); Rob Routs (Chairman of the Supervisory board)
- Products: Nutritional ingredients, specialty food ingredients, engineering plastics, Dyneema, coatings, biomedical materials, biomass conversion technology, solar efficiency technology.
- Revenue: €8.632 billion (2017)
- Operating income: €957 million (2017)
- Net income: €649 million (2017)
- Total assets: €12.802 billion (2017)
- Total equity: €7.065 billion (2017)
- Number of employees: 21,054 (2017)
- Website: dsm.com

Koninklijke DSM N.V. (Royal DSM, commonly known as DSM, which is the acronym for Dutch State Mines), was a Dutch multinational corporation active in the fields of health, nutrition, and materials. Headquartered in Maastricht, at the end of 2017 DSM employed 21,054 people in approximately 50 countries and posted net sales of €8.632 billion in 2018 and €9.204 billion in 2021. In May 2023, it merged with the Swiss company Firmenich to form a new entity named dsm-firmenich.

== History ==
DSM was formed by the Dutch state in 1902 to mine coal reserves in southern Limburg and although the company had diversified into commodity chemicals and petrochemicals by 1973, when the last mine closed, DSM retains a link to its origins by continuing to use the initials, originally an abbreviation for Dutch State Mines, to this day.

During World War II researchers worked on penicillin. The code name Bacinol was used to keep the research secret from the Germans. The research was done at the company Koninklijke Nederlandsche Gist- en Spiritusfabriek, 'Royal Dutch Yeast and Spirits Factory', later becoming DSM Sinochem Pharmaceuticals, in Delft.

In 1989, the government floated 70% of its shares in the company on the Amsterdam Stock Exchange (now Euronext Amsterdam) with the remaining 30% floated in 1996, thereby completing DSM's privatisation. The 21st century has seen DSM follow successive five-year strategic periods of portfolio transformation and internationalisation involving acquisitions, divestments and partnerships. In 2001, 48% of DSM's workforce was based in the Netherlands; in 2017, this was 18%.

In 2022, DSM and Swiss privately owned group Firmenich announced their intention to form a "merger of equals" to form DSM-Firmenich. The merger was completed in May 2023.

=== Acquisitions ===
- 1998: Koninklijke Gist-Brocades N.V. (food ingredients, pharmaceuticals, yeast- and enzyme-based production process technology).
- 2000: Catalytica Pharmaceuticals (pharmaceutical intermediates).
- 2003: Roche – vitamin division.
- 2005: NeoResins (water-based coating resins).
- 2011: Martek Biosciences Corporation (nutritional products derived from microalgae and fermentation technology).
- 2011: Vitatene (natural carotenoids derived from fermentation of Blakeslea trispora fungus).
- 2012: Verenium – food enzymes and oilseed processing business division.
- 2012: Kensey Nash (biomedical regenerative medicine).
- 2012: Ocean Nutrition Canada (fish-oil derived nutritional products).
- 2012: Cargill – cultures and enzymes business division.
- 2012: Fortitech (customised nutrient premixes).
- 2013: Unitech (micronutrient premixes and macronutrient blends).
- 2013: Andre Pectin (food hydrocolloids).
- 2013: Tortuga (nutritional supplements for pasture raised cattle).
- 2015: Åland (vitamin C).
- 2015: Cubic Tech (high-performance, ultra-lightweight, flexible laminates and fabrics).
- 2020: Erber Group – Biomin and Romer Labs (mycotoxin and allergen tests in food).
- 2020: Glycom (human milk oligosaccharides, infant formula supplement).
- 2021: Amyris – Flavour & Fragrance business division.

=== Divestments ===
- 2002: Petrochemicals (hydrocarbons, polyethylenes, polypropylenes, polyolefins).
- 2001: Quinine and Cinchona Alcaloids to Buchler GmbH.
- 2010: Ammonia, fertiliser and melamine.
- 2010: Thermoplastic elastomers.
- 2010: EP(D)M rubber.
- 2010: Toluene oxidation.
- 2017: Patheon, a pharmaceutical contract development and manufacturing organisation (CDMO) joint venture with JLL Partners, to Thermo Fisher Scientific Inc.
- 2021: Resins & Functional Materials business to Covestro AG.
- 2022: Protective Materials business to Avient Corporation
- 2022: Engineering Materials business to Advent International and LANXESS

=== Partnerships ===
DSM has stated that these partnerships have been created with a view to the company's ultimate exit from the businesses concerned.

- 2009: DSM and NCPC sign contracts to establish nutrition and anti-infectives joint ventures in China
- 2011: DSM Sinochem Pharmaceuticals, joint venture (DSM 50%) with the Sinochem Group. DSM Sinochem Pharmaceuticals is a manufacturer of generic anti-infective molecules.
- 2015: ChemicaInvest, joint venture (DSM 35%) with CVC Capital Partners. ChemicaInvest consists of three business units; Aliancys (composite resins), AnQore (acrylonitrile), and Fibrant (caprolactam).

DSM has applied IFRS 11 to its associates and joint ventures since 2013.

== Organisation ==
DSM's five business groups are clustered according to product and market combinations, with the business group directors reporting directly to the Managing Board. Since 2015, DSM's activities have been grouped into three clusters: Nutrition, Materials and Innovation Center.

=== Nutrition ===
The Nutrition cluster is made up of DSM Nutritional Products and DSM Food Specialties. DSM Nutritional Products produces essential nutrients such as synthetic vitamins, carotenoids, human milk oligosaccharides, nutritional lipids and other ingredients for the feed, food, pharmaceutical and personal care industries. DSM Food Specialties manufactures food enzymes, cultures, yeast extracts, savoury flavours, hydrocolloids and other specialty ingredients for the dairy, baking, beverage and savoury segments. DSM also manufacturers a novel cattle feed additive (Bovaer) to reduce methane production from dairy production. In 2021, DSM was ranked 6th on FoodTalks' list of Top 30 Global Probiotic Food Ingredient Companies.

=== Materials ===
The Materials cluster is made up of DSM Engineering Materials, DSM Protective Materials and DSM Resins & Functional Materials. DSM Engineering Materials’ specialty plastics are used in components for the electrical and electronics, automotive, flexible food packaging and consumer goods industries. DSM Protective Materials is the inventor, manufacturer and marketer of Dyneema. DSM Resins & Functional Materials manufacture resins solutions for paints, inks, stereolithography, and industrial and optical fibre coatings.

=== Innovation Center ===
In addition to the role of supporting innovation in the businesses and DSM's venturing activities, the Innovation Center is responsible for the company's ‘Emerging Business Areas’; DSM Biomedical (biomaterials and regenerative medical devices), DSM Bio-based Products & Services (biomass-conversion technology) and DSM Advanced Solar (AR-coatings and Photovoltaic-films for solar modules).

=== Sustainability ===
Since 2004, DSM has been either the Materials industry group leader, (7 years) or among the leaders in the annual Dow Jones Sustainability Index.

== Shares ==
DSM is listed on Euronext Amsterdam and is a constituent of the AEX index. Options on DSM shares are traded on the European Option Exchange in Amsterdam. In the US, a sponsored unlisted American Depositary Receipts (ADR) programme is provided by Deutsche Bank Trust Co. Americas. These ADR's are listed on the OTCQX International Premier Marketplace.
