= ApNano =

Nanotech company

NanoMaterials, Ltd
- Trade name: ApNano
- Type: Privately held company
- Industry: nanotechnology
- Founded: 2002 in Israel
- Founders: Dr. Menachem Genut and Mr. Aharon Feuerstein
- Defunct: 2012
- Fate: Acquired
- Successor: Nanotech Industrial Solutions
- Headquarters: Yavne, Israel
- Products: Nanoparticles of Inorganic Fullerene-like Tungsten Disulfide (IF-WS_{2})
- Website: www.apnano.com

ApNano was an Israeli nanotechnology company, that was wholly owned and operated by American Nanotech Industrial Solutions (NIS) since 2012. It had an R&D lab, manufacturing, blending and packaging facilities in Avenel, New Jersey, United States, and Yavne, Israel.

NIS was the only company in the world with an exclusive license to manufacture inorganic fullerene-like tungsten disulfide (IF-WS_{2}) submicron (nanosized) spherical particles on a commercial scale with the patent from the Weizmann Institute. These inorganic fullerene-like tungsten disulfide-based nanomaterials opened up new possibilities for developing extreme performance industrial lubricants, coatings, and polymer composites.

== History ==
Dr. Menachem Genut and Mr. Aharon Feuerstein founded the company in 2002. Dr. Genut served as president and CEO until 2010, and Mr. Feuerstein served as chairman of the board and CFO until 2010.[2]

In 2013 AP Nano became a wholly owned subsidiary of the American company “Nanotech Industrial Solutions, Inc.” The CEO of NIS became Dr. George Diloyan, Ph.D. and CFO is Mr. Steven Wegbreit. ApNano's COO was Dr. Alexander Margolin, Ph.D. Mr. Itsik Havakuk served as Vice President of Global Sales and Marketing.

== Technology ==
NIS specialized in commercial manufacturing of nanoparticles of Inorganic Fullerene-like Tungsten Disulfide (IF-WS_{2}). The particles are called Inorganic Fullerene-like (IF), because of the near spherical geometry and a hollow core – similar to carbon fullerenes. The name “fullerenes” or “buckyballs” came from the architectural modeler Richard Buckminster Fuller, who popularized the geodesic dome. Professor Reshef Tenne discovered Inorganic Fullerene-like nanoparticles (IF-MXy where M- is transition metal and X - is chalcogen group) at the Weizmann Institute of Science in 1992. The diameter of the primary particle can range between 20 – 280 nm. IF-WS_{2} nanoparticles with a hollow sphere (Fullerene-like) morphology, provide extreme lubricity, anti-friction, and high impact resistance (up to 35 GPa).

TEM Image of IF-WS2, courtesy of The Weizmann Institute of Science

Unlike standard solids that have platelet-like structures with moderate tribological properties, IF-WS_{2} particles have tens of caged concentric layers, making these particles excel under extreme pressure or load, thus significantly reducing friction and wear. (also see tribology).

== Products ==
=== IF-WS_{2} Formulated ===
In late 2018 APNano and NIS have undergone substantial structural changes, updating the product line and changing the name from “NanoLub” to “IF-WS_{2} Formulated.” IF-WS_{2} formulations are designed to lower friction and operating temperature, thereby reducing mechanical wear. At the same time, contact pressure causes submicron spheres of IF-WS_{2} to release tribofilms that attach to surface, reduce wear and filling asperities and smooth them, improving overall efficiency while extending machinery life.

The company offered industrial lubricant additives and tribological packages based on IF-WS_{2} particles. The additives were also available as a dispersion in oil, water, and solvent. Possible applications include, but not limited to, lubricants, grease, metalworking fluids, coatings, paints, and polymers used in mining, marine, heavy machinery, power station, space, and military industrial sectors.
