= Rob Routs =

Dutch businessman (born 1946)

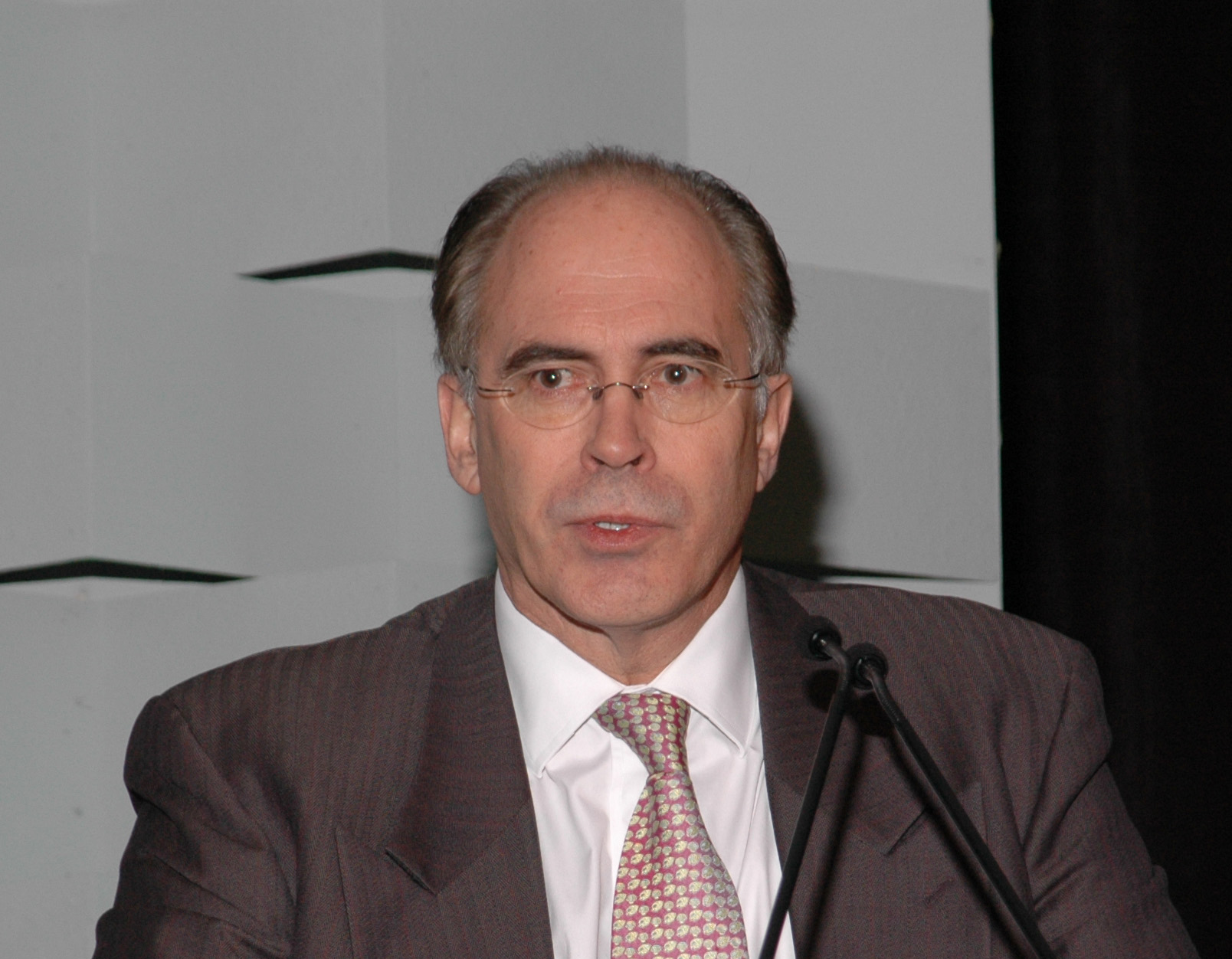
Routs in 2007

Rob Routs (born 10 September 1946, Australia) is a Dutch businessman. He is a former executive of Royal Dutch Shell and has recently been appointed chairman of AEGON.

== Education ==
Routs received a Masters of Chemical Engineering degree from the Eindhoven University of Technology in the Netherlands in 1969. Following a research assignment at the Stockholm University medical facility, he returned to the Technical University of Eindhoven, where he obtained a PhD in technical sciences in 1971.

== Career ==
He has held a number of positions at Shell, including Exploration and Production, Montreal Refinery, Scotford Refinery, vice president manufacturing and distribution, Shell Canada, president of Shell Canada Oil Products, head of Shell International Research and Technology Services Group Oil Products, chief executive of Equilon. After Shell acquired Texaco's ownership in Equilon, he became the president and CEO of Shell Oil Products US. He was also president of Shell Oil Company US and country chair of Shell US.

Routs became a group managing director and joined the Committee of Managing Directors (now replaced by the Executive Committee) in July 2003. He was named executive director of Shell Downstream Business in 2004. He retired from this position and as a group managing director and member of the executive committee of Shell at the end of 2008. He was succeeded by Mark Williams who reported to Routs as executive vice president of supply and distribution.

In February 2009 he was selected to replace Dudley Eustace as chairman of the insurance and pension group AEGON in 2010.

In December 2010, he was appointed to the board of directors for AECOM. He will join the AECOM Board's Audit, Nominating and Governance as well as its Planning, Finance and Investments committees.

== Personal life ==
Routs and his wife, Janicke, have one son and five daughters. His personal interests are opera, theatre, and tennis. He speaks English, Dutch, French, German and, to a lesser degree, Swedish and Italian.
