= List of equipment of the Royal Brunei Land Force =

Royal Brunei Land Forces weapons

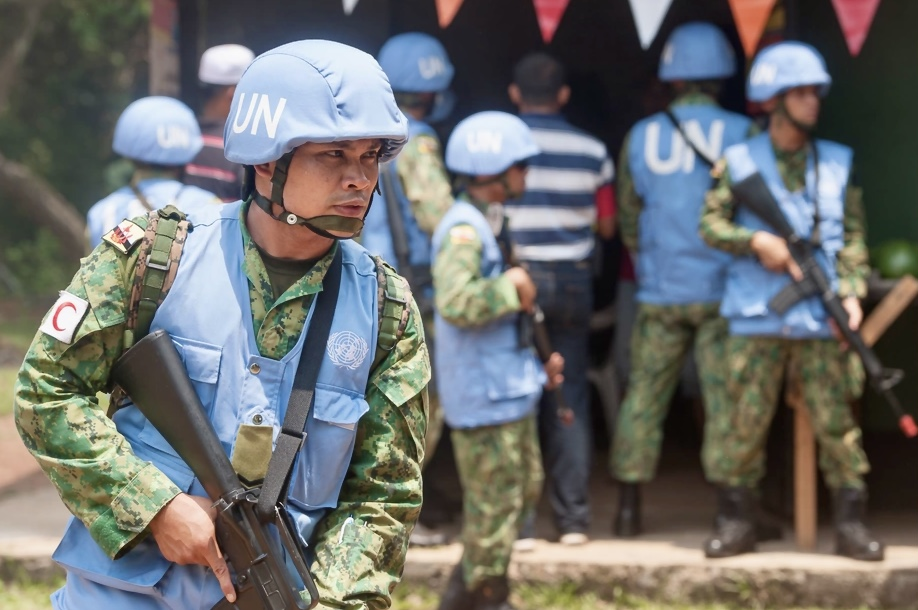
Bruneian soldiers during a peacekeeping mission in Port Dickson District in 2015.

The equipment of the Royal Brunei Land Forces (RBLF) can be subdivided into: infantry weapons, vehicles, unmanned aerial vehicle (UAVs), and radars. The vehicles operated by the RBLF usually have the identification of the Royal Brunei Armed Forces painted on them.

== Vehicles ==
=== Ground vehicles ===
| Vehicle | Image | Type | Origin | Quantity | Notes | Ref. |
Light tanks
| FV101 Scorpion CVR(T) | | Light tank | United Kingdom | 20 | Purchased in 1976, sixteen tanks have been modified as of 2003. The ROF 76mm L23A1 main guns are fitted with laser rangefinders. | |
Light mobility vehicles
| Cendana Auto 4x4 | | Light armoured assault vehicle | Malaysia | 16 | Weapons carrier variant (ARTAC), primarily used as a weapons carrier platform, also used as a strike and light mobility vehicle. | |
| Al-Thalab | | Light armoured assault vehicle | Japan; Jordan | Unknown | The vehicle's primary responsibilities include urban operations, casualty evacuation, force projection and offensive action, and surveillance and reconnaissance. | |
| Toyota Land Cruiser | | Armoured assault vehicle | Japan | Unknown | Special Forces Regiment Vehicle; equipped with blue LED lights, bulletproof glass, and tactical elevated system. All vehicles are in Black colour scheme. | |
Armoured personnel carriers
| Véhicule de l'Avant Blindé (VAB) VTT | | Armoured personnel carrier | France | 45 | NBC protected and equipped with amphibious capabilities, the VAB is a front-line armoured vehicle. The 4×4 arrangement is used in Brunei and is lighter and more manoeuvrable on roads. | |
| FV105 Sultan | | Armoured command vehicle | United Kingdom | 2 | To make the main compartment of the car more comfortable, the roof has been raised. The vehicle commander and a radio operator might be positioned ahead of this. The car also has eight smoke dischargers mounted on the front of the car and an NBC protection system installed. | |
| FV106 Samson | | Armoured recovery vehicle | United Kingdom | 1 | The vehicle's purpose on the battlefield was to rescue vehicles that were toppled or damaged. In addition, it tows damaged cars to maintenance facilities or offers maintenance services. | |
Transport vehicles
| DefTech Handalan II | | Transport vehicle | Malaysia | 115 | DefTech finished building 69 Handalan II vehicles for the RBAF in 2005. As of mid-2009, another batch of Handalan II vehicles were ordered. | |
| Iveco EuroCargo | | Transport vehicle | Italy | Unknown | The midsize off-road vehicle with a large payload and GVW of up to 15 tons is the foundation of the EuroCargo 4x4. | |
| Iveco VM 90 | | Transport vehicle | Italy | Unknown | The VM 90 Torpedo (Tactical) version with tarpaulin covered rear was possibly bought by Brunei. It functions as a tactical 4x4 that can carry out a variety of tasks. | |
| Mercedes-Benz Atego | | Transport vehicle | Germany | Unknown | The GVW range for the lightweight, medium-duty truck line Atego is 10 to 15 tons. | |
| Leyland DAF T244 | | Transport vehicle | United Kingdom | 41 | 41 acquired in 1995 | |
| Kia KM450 | | Light utility vehicle | South Korea | 1 | This transport vehicle was created in South Korea to move both soldiers and supplies. Only one vehicle has been acquired in 2018 | |
| Land Rover Wolf | | Light utility vehicle | United Kingdom | Unknown | 16 acquired in 2017; several painted white for ceremonial purposes | |
| Land Rover Defender | | Light utility vehicle | United Kingdom | Unknown | A single vehicle has been converted for ceremonial purposes | |
| Mitsubishi Triton KA/KB | | Light utility vehicle | Japan | Unknown | Several L200s operated by military police | |
| Mercedes-Benz G-Wagon | | Light utility vehicle | Germany | Unknown | | |
| Polaris MRZR-4 | | | United States | Unknown | | |
| Suzuki DR-Z400 | | Reconnaissance vehicle | Japan | Unknown | | |
| Kawasaki KLX250 | | Reconnaissance vehicle | Japan | Unknown | | |
| Suzuki GSX750 | | Reconnaissance vehicle | Japan | Unknown | Operated by military police. | |
| Yamaha FZ8N | | Reconnaissance vehicle | Japan | Unknown | Operated by military police. | |
| Yamaha XT1200Z | | Reconnaissance vehicle | Japan | Unknown | Operated by military police. | |
| Yamaha XT250 | | Reconnaissance vehicle | Japan | Unknown | | |
Rescue and medical vehicles
| Toyota HiLux (AN10/AN20/AN30) | | Battlefield ambulance | Japan | Unknown | 2 acquired in 2013 | |
| Land Rover Wolf | | Battlefield ambulance | United Kingdom | Unknown | | |
| Ford Ranger T6 | | Battlefield ambulance | United States | Unknown | Serve areas inaccessible to domestic ambulances. | |
| Véhicule de l'Avant Blindé (VAB) VTT | | Medical evacuation vehicle | France | Unknown | The primary functions of the vehicle are to transport and evacuate casualties. Operated by combat medics and Medical Reception Services (MRS). | |
Artillery
| L118 | | Towed howitzer | United Kingdom | 6 | | |
Communications vehicles
| MAN TGS | | Brigade command post | Austria; Germany | Unknown | At least 5 acquired in 2023 | |
Engineering and logistics
| Iveco Daily | | Van | Italy | Unknown | Used by the Chemical Biological Radiological and Explosive Defence Unit of the Support Battalion. | |
| Volvo FMX 400 | | Tank truck | Sweden | Unknown | Operated by the Royal Brunei Air Force at Rimba Air Force Base | |
| Hino 300 | | Tow truck | Japan | Unknown | Operated by the Gurkha Reserve Unit | |
| Nissan UD90 | | Light dumper truck | Japan | Unknown | 2 acquired in 2013 | |
| Scania P-series | | Tipper Truck | Sweden | Unknown | 1 acquired in 2013 | |
| M30H Trackway | | Medium ground mobility system | United States | 5 | 5 acquired in 2022 | |
| Grove GMK3050 | | All-terrain crane | Germany | Unknown | | |
| tEODor | | Ordnance disposal robot | Germany | Unknown | | |
Unmanned aerial vehicles
| DJI Matrice 300 RTK | | M an-portable mini-unmanned aerial vehicle | People's Republic of China | Unknown | Used by Intelligence Section | |
| DJI Mavic 2 | | M an-portable mini-unmanned aerial vehicle | People's Republic of China | Unknown | Used by Intelligence Section | |

=== Watercraft ===
| Vehicle | Image | Type | Origin | Quantity | Notes | Ref |
Fast boat
| KH-27 | | Patrol boat | Brunei | 5 | Used for patrols and search and rescue operations | |
| Diamondback Airboats | | Airboat | United States | Unknown | | |
| | | Inflatable boat | | 6 | Acquired in 2017 | |

== Firearms ==
| Model | Image | Calibre | Origin | Variant | Notes | Ref |
Pistols
| Browning HP | | 9×19mm Parabellum | Belgium; United States | | | |
| Pindad G2 | | 9×19mm Parabellum | Indonesia | G2 Elite | | |
| SIG Sauer P226 | | 9×19mm Parabellum | West Germany; Switzerland | | Used by the Special Forces Regiment (RPK) | |
Submachine guns
| Heckler & Koch MP5 | | 9×19mm Parabellum | West Germany | MP5A3/MP5SD/MP5K | Used by the Special Forces Regiment (RPK) | |
| Heckler & Koch MP7 | | 4.6×30mm | Germany | MP7A1 | Used by the Special Forces Regiment (RPK) | |
Assault rifles
| M16 rifle | | 5.56×45mm NATO | United States | M16A1/A2 | Standard infantry rifle for all branches | |
| Bushmaster M4 Carbine | | 5.56×45mm NATO | United States | M4A1 | Standard carbine rifle for the Army, include Special Forces Regiment | |
| SAR 21 | | 5.56×45mm NATO | Singapore | | Limited use | |
Designated-marksman rifles
| FN SCAR | | 7.62×51mm NATO | Belgium | SCAR-H PR | Seen on display during the RBAF's 63rd anniversary | |
Sniper rifles
| Accuracy International Arctic Warfare | | .308 Winchester/7.62×51mm NATO | United Kingdom | AWM | Used by the Special Forces Regiment (RPK) | |
| SAKO M591 | | .308 Winchester | Finland | | Used by the Special Forces Regiment (RPK) | |
Machine guns
| M2 Browning | | .50 BMG | United States | | | |
| Ultimax 100 | | 5.56×45mm NATO | Singapore | | | |
| L7A2 | | 7.62×51mm NATO | Belgium | MAG-58 | | |
| SIG MG 710-3 | | 7.62×51mm NATO | Switzerland | | | |
Shotguns
| Winchester Model 1200/1300 | | 12/16/20 gauge | United States | | | |
Grenade launchers
| M203 | | 40mm grenade | United States | | | |
Grenades
| M75 | | Hand grenade | Yugoslavia | | | |
Bayonets
| M7 | | Spear point | United States | | The M7 bayonet fits onto the muzzle of the M16 rifle | |
Mortars
| L16 | | 81mm mortar | United Kingdom; Canada | | | |
Man-portable anti-tank systems
| Armbrust | | 67mm projectile | West Germany | | 500 bought in 1985, eventual requirement was for 2,000 | |
| C90-CR (M3) | | 90mm rocket-propelled grenade launcher | Spain | | | |
| RGW90 | | 90mm rocket-propelled grenade launcher | Germany | | | |
Man-portable air-defense systems
| Mistral | | 90mm MANPADS | France | | | |

== Personnel equipment ==
| Name | Image | Origin | Variant | Notes | Ref |
Helmets
| PASGT | | United States | | Standard issued | |
| Enhanced Combat Helmet | | United States | | Used by infantry | |
| United Shield International Special Ops Rogue | | United Kingdom | H-mount | Used by infantry | |
Body armour
| Crib Gogh Rogue | | United Kingdom | Rogue II | Used by infantry | |
| Scalable Plate Carrier | Special_Forces_Regiment_(Brunei) | United States | | Used by Special Force Regiment | |
| CIRAS | Special_Forces_Regiment_combat_dress_(Brunei_2024)_01 | United States | | Used by Special Force Regiment | |
| Bomb Suit | | United States | | | |
Electronical
| PVS-7 | | United States | | Used by Special Force Regiment | |
| RF-5800V; RF-7800V; RF-7800S | | United States | | | |
| RF-5800H-MP; RF-7800V-MP; RF-7400E-MP; RF-7800M-MP | | United States | | | |

=== Other Equipment ===
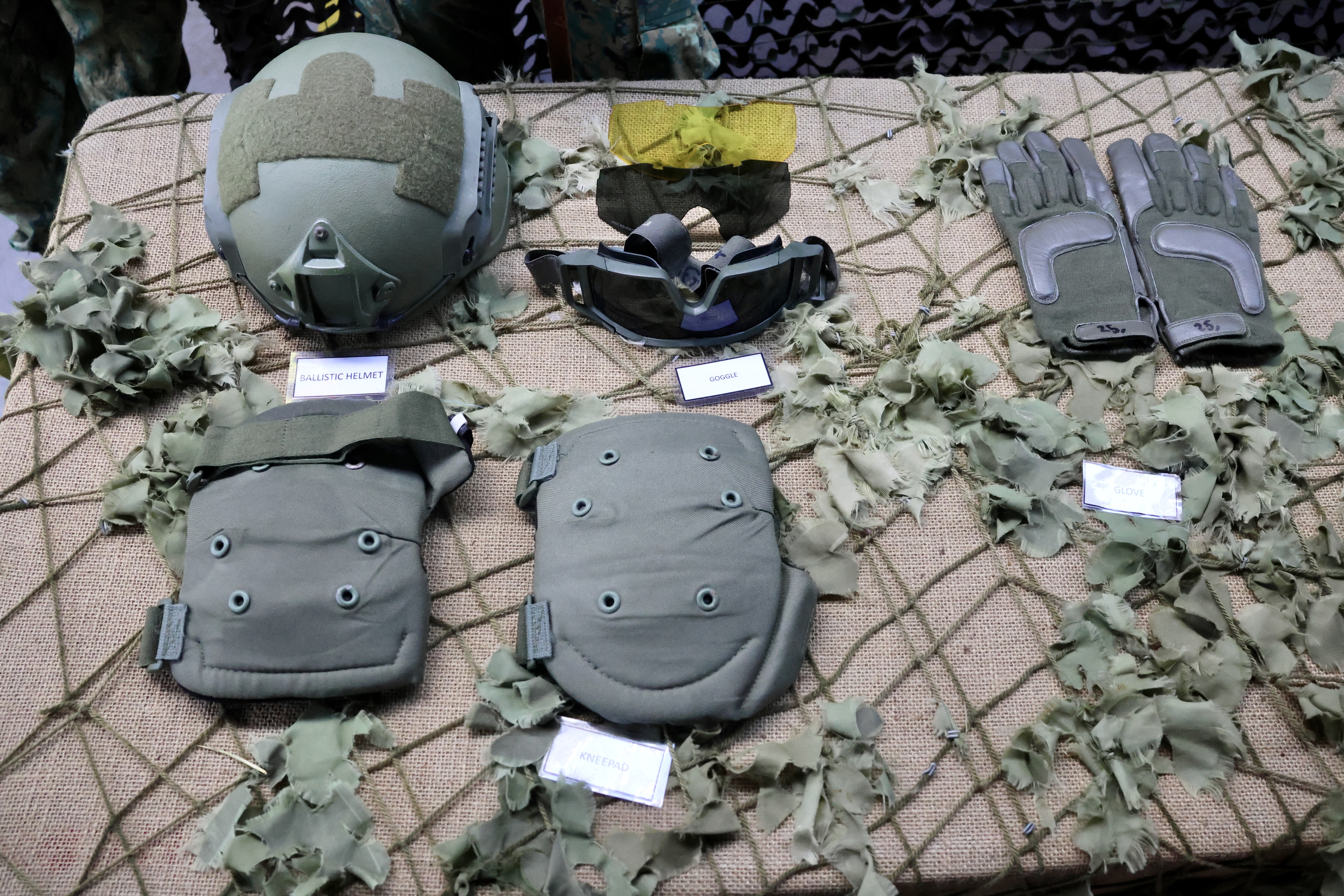
Ballistic helmet, Goggles, Glove, Elbowpad and Kneepad

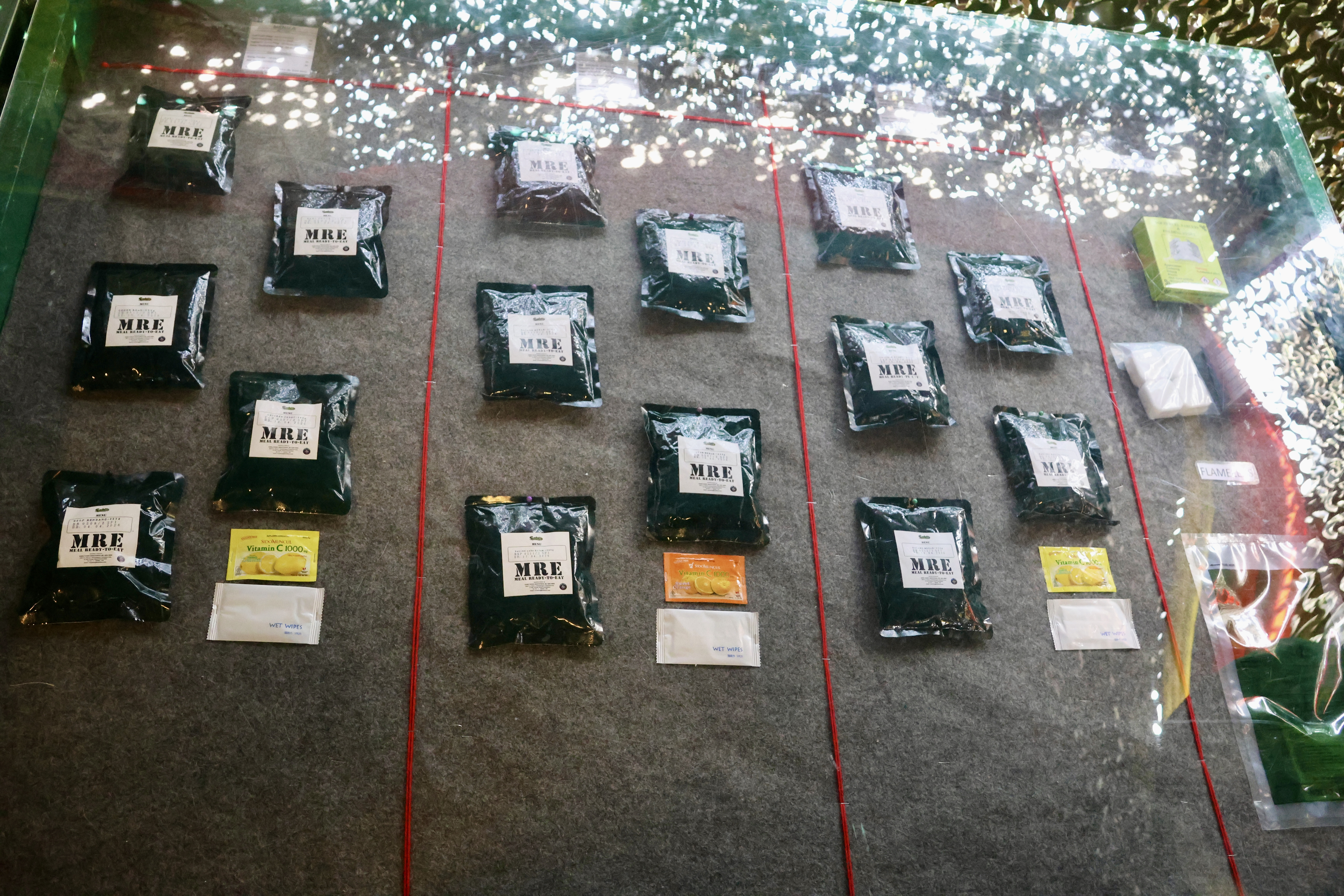
Variant of MREs

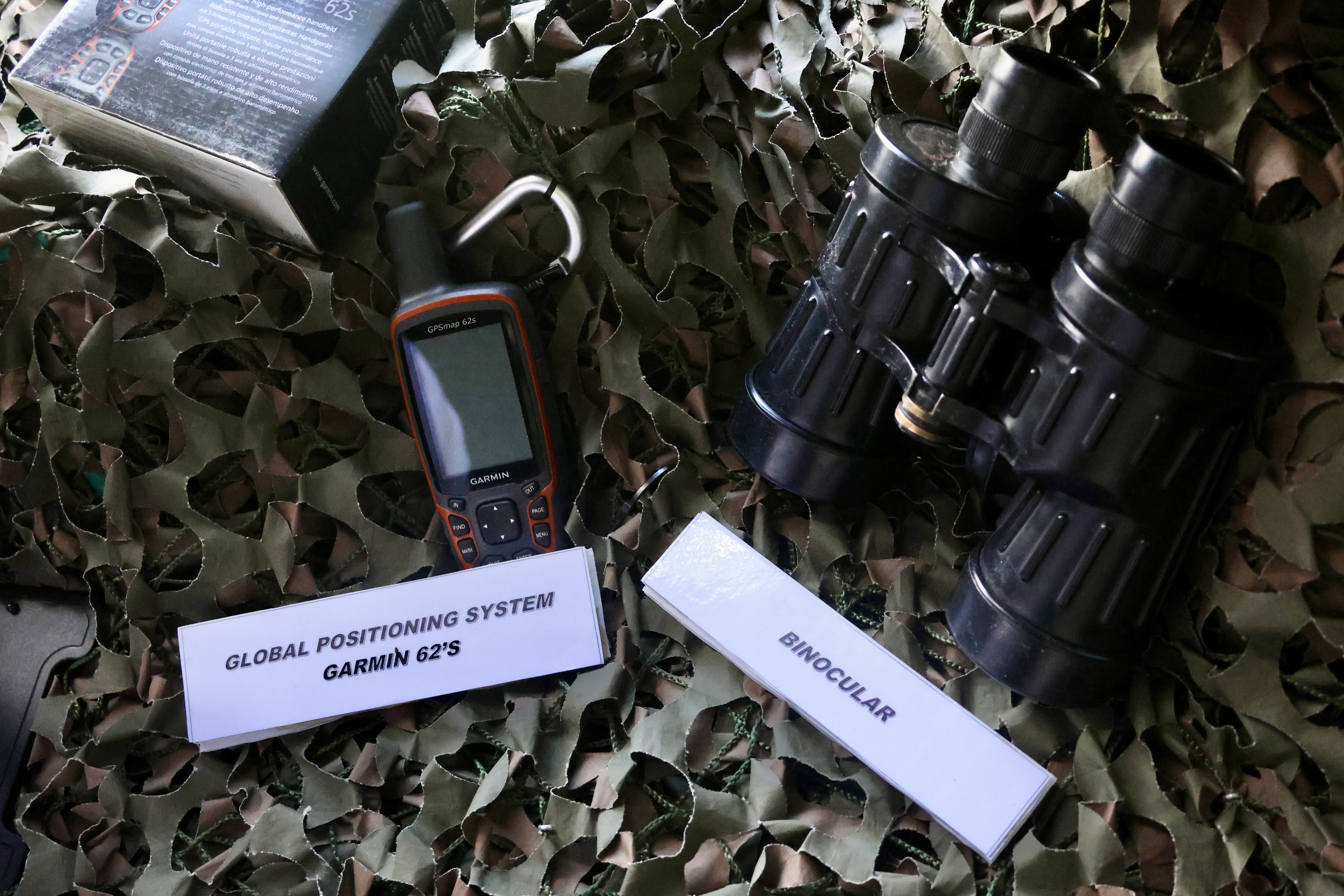
Garmin G2 and Binocular

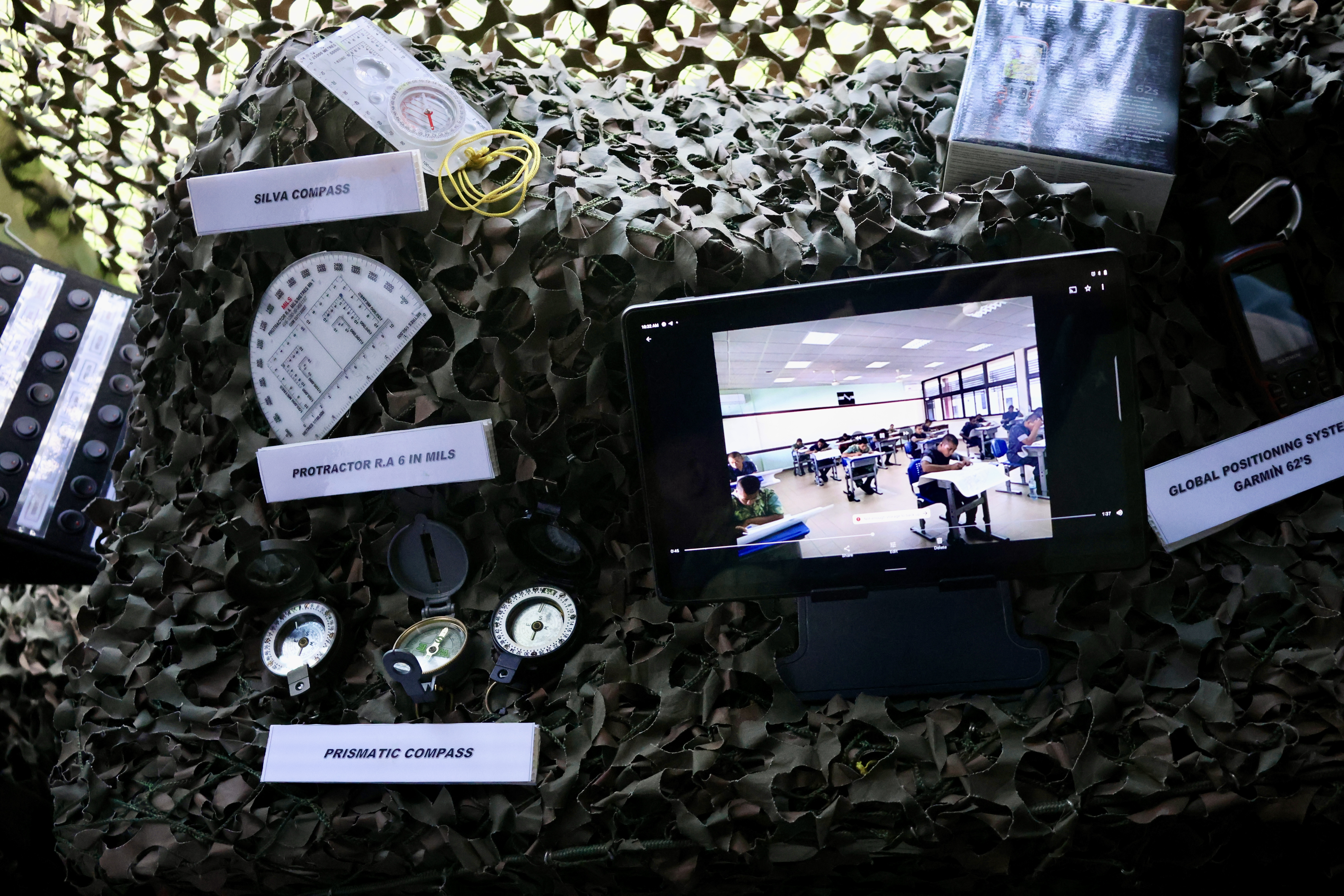
Navigation tools

== Uniforms ==
Current uniforms
| Name | Pattern name | Pattern | Image | Origin | Notes |
|---|---|---|---|---|---|
| Digital Disruptive Pattern (D2P) | Digital Disruptive Pattern | | | Singapore | Introduced in 2011, produced by Singaporean company Force-21; standard RBLF uniform pattern. |
| Harimau Gurun Desert Pattern | Digital Disruptive Pattern | | | Malaysia | A variant of the Malay Tigerstripe Woodland pattern but with earth-brown stripes on a light green and sand-coloured background. Used during the United Nations's 2010 UNIFIL. |
| Multicam | Multicam | | | United States | Used by Special Force Regiment. |
Former uniforms
| Disruptive Pattern Material (DPM) | Disruptive Pattern Material | | | United Kingdom | It is a locally produced copy of British DPM; replaced by D2P in 2011. |

== Historic equipment ==
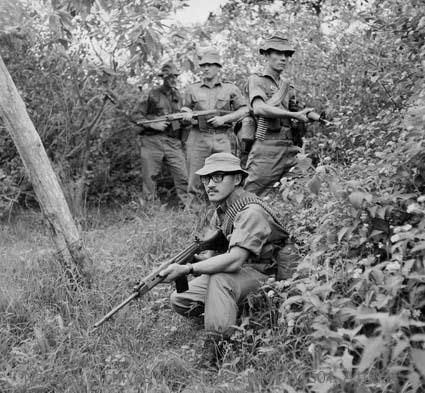
Bruneian soldiers armed with L1A1 SLRs in Australia, 1969

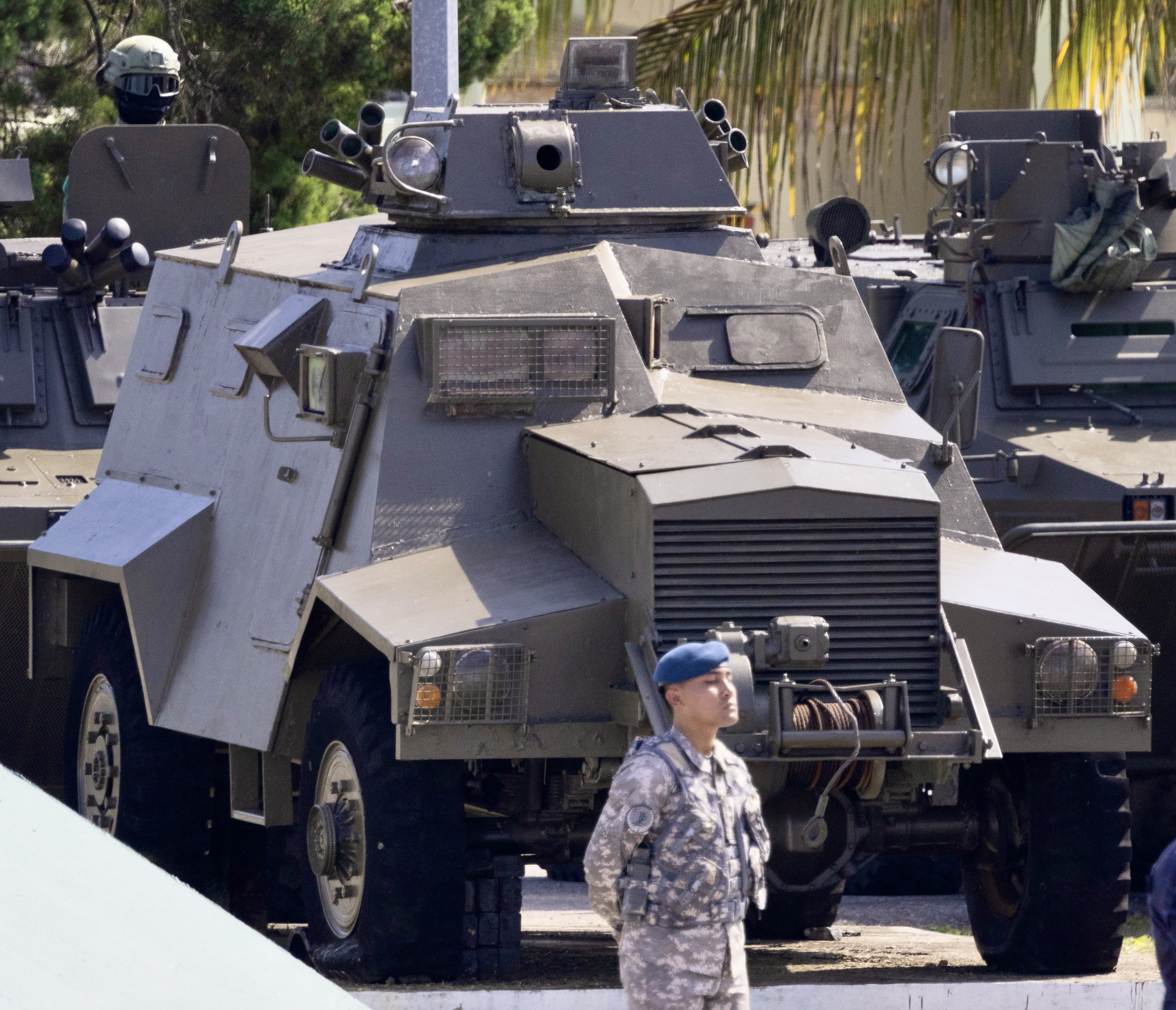
A retired Bruneian GKN Sankey AT104 on display in 2024

- AK-47
- Alvis Saracen
- Browning Automatic Rifle
- Colt M16 LMG
- Ferret armoured car
- L1A1 Self-Loading Rifle
- Lee–Enfield bolt-action rifle
- M1911 pistol
- M1919 Browning machine gun
- M3 submachine gun
- MG 3 machine gun
- Saxon armoured personnel carrier
- Sterling submachine gun
- Wasp 58 recoilless rocket launcher

== Future equipment ==
There are reports that Brunei is or was interested in Indonesian APCs to replace the VAB APC

During BRIDEX 2011, the Turkish company FNSS Defence Systems was looking forward in securing a deal with the Brunei government for Armoured combat vehicles (ACV).

Brunei has expressed purchasing between 40 and 50 of the Indonesian/Turkish Harimau/Kaplan medium tank.

Brunei has also shown interest in Russian equipment including:

- Kamov Ka-50 attack helicopters
- Kh-35 BAL-E coastal missile system
- SA-15 Tor missile system
- SA-17 Buk missile system
- T-90 main battle tanks
