= Ranger Body Armor =

Military body armor

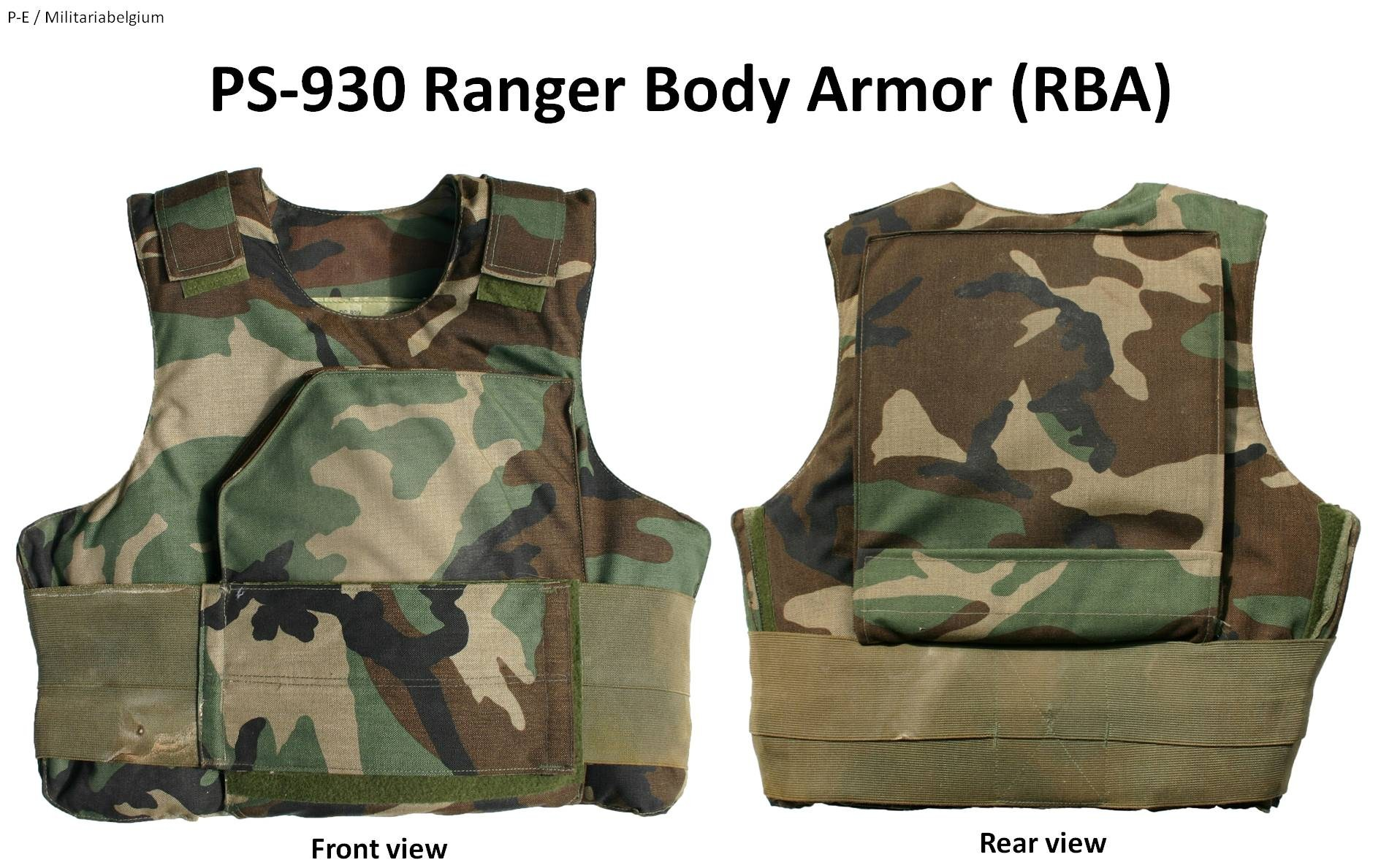
- Front and rear view of the Ranger Body Armor (RBA) made by Protective Materials, Inc. in October 2003
- Type: Bullet-resistant armor
- Place of origin: United States

Service history
- Used by: US Army

Production history
- Designer: Natick Research, Development and Engineering Center

Specifications
- Weight: Size medium: 8 lb (3.6 kg) for vest only; 16 lb (7.3 kg) for vest w/ 1 plate; 24 lb (11 kg) for vest w/ 2 plates

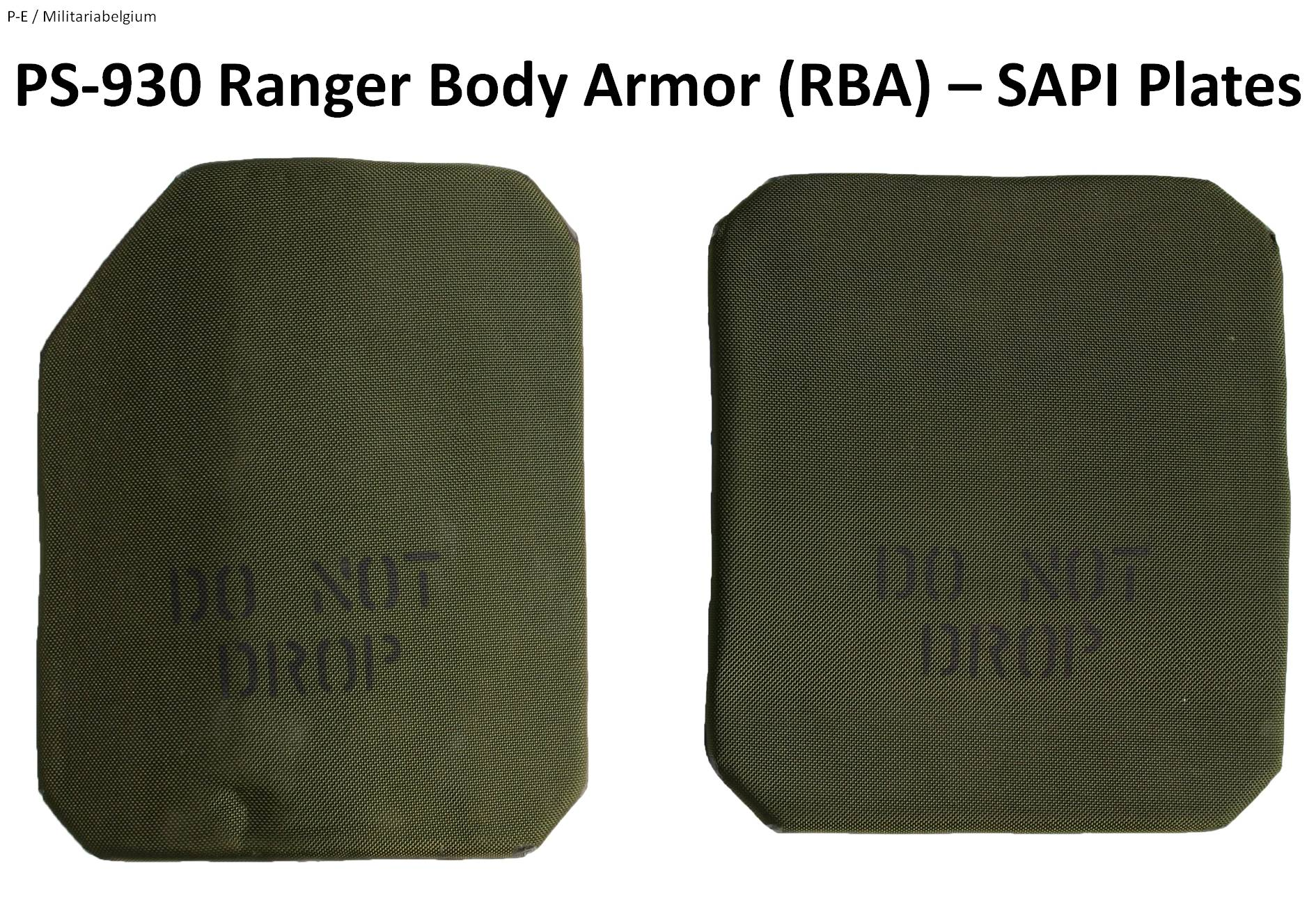
Both the front and rear Small Arms Protective Insert (SAPI) plates of Ranger Body Armor, which offer protection against Caliber .30, Ball

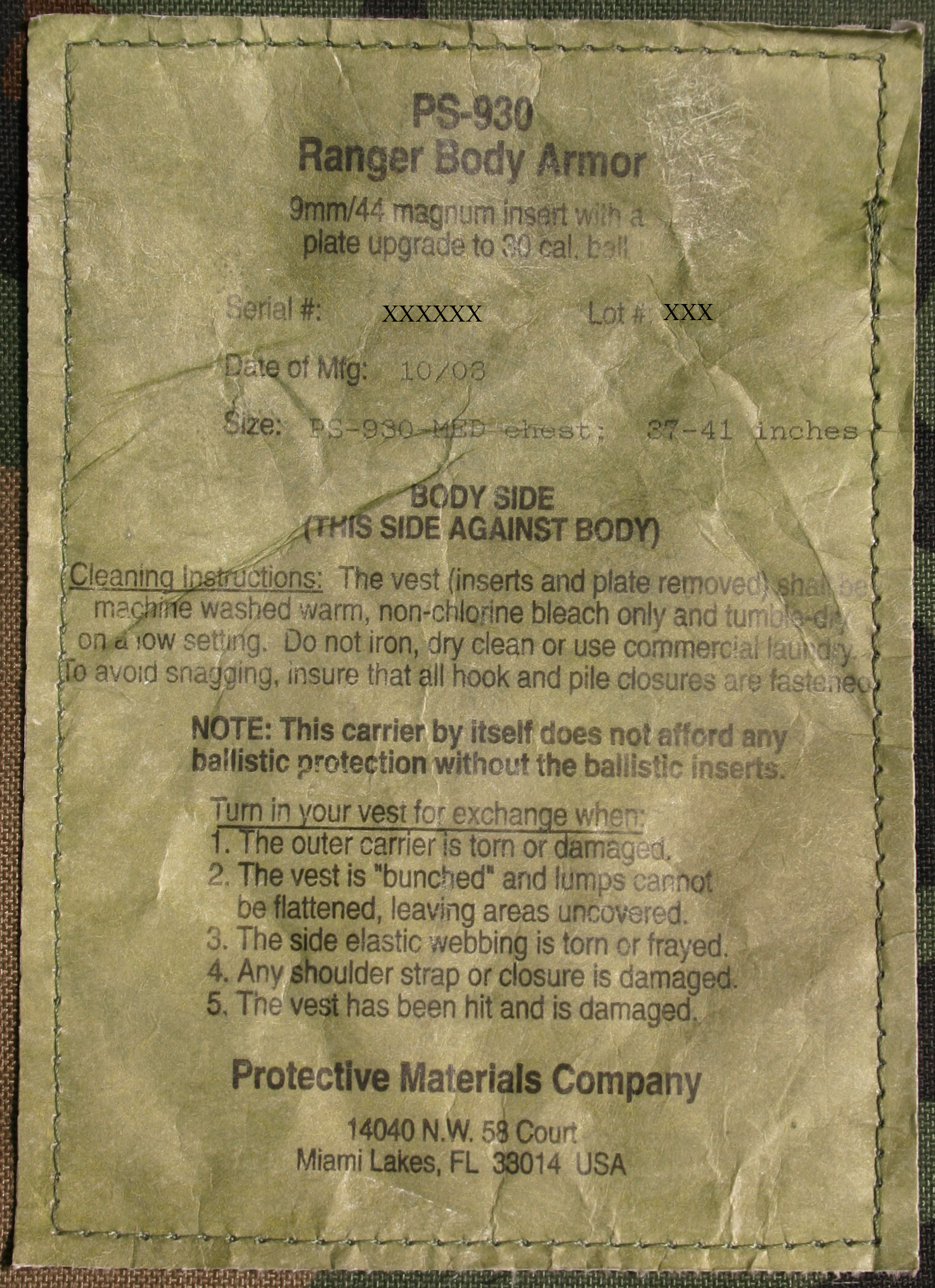
The label of Ranger Body Armor PS-930 – dated October 2003 (printed as 10/03, or mm/yy)

Ranger Body Armor (RBA) is a US military-issue ballistic vest that was designed for, and used chiefly by, US Army 75th Ranger Regiment operators ("Rangers") in the 1990s and 2000s. The RBA system has since been replaced by other specialized body armor systems adopted by the US Special Operations Command (USSOCOM).

Ranger Body Armor was designed by the US Army Natick Research, Development and Engineering Center (NRDEC) in Natick, Massachusetts to meet the operational needs of the 75th Ranger Regiment. RBA was first manufactured by Protective Materials, Inc., then HS Manufacturing, and later by Ceradyne.

== Components ==
RBA consists of two main components: a flexible soft armor vest, plus 1-to-2 rigid ceramic plates, both of which provide ballistic protection to the upper torso.

=== Soft armor vest ===
The base vest is a nylon Woodland camouflage-printed carrier that encases flexible soft armor panels, which consist of an aramid (Kevlar KM2) filler. A size medium RBA without plates weighs approximately 8 pounds (3.6 kg). The base vest (soft armor) provides ballistic protection to Threat Level IIIA, according to the NIJ's ballistic resistance standards (formerly 'ballistic resistance of police body armor' standards), which provides protection from 9 mm and 44 Magnum threats.

The base RBA vest provides fragmentation protection almost 25% greater than that of the Personnel Armor System for Ground Troops (PASGT) vest.

=== Ceramic plates ===
To be completed, an RBA vest will accept one-to-two ceramic plates (depending on model), each weighing 8 pounds (3.6 kg), which make up its rifle protection capability. The ceramic plates are made up of repeating 2 in × 2 in (51 mm × 51 mm) aluminum oxide ceramic tiles.

A size medium RBA vest loaded with one ceramic plate weighs 16 pounds (7.3 kg). A size medium RBA vest fully loaded with both ceramic plates weighs 24 pounds (11 kg). When plates are inserted into the pockets of the vest, it protects an area of about 10 in × 12 in (250 mm × 300 mm) from 5.56×45mm NATO and 7.62×51mm NATO rounds.

== Fielding ==
In November 1994, the RBA was set to type classification (TC) limited procurement-urgent (LPU). The RBA vest was available for purchase through the General Services Administration (GSA) contract GS-07F-6041A, from Protective Materials, Inc. The flexible soft armor vest was available in three sizes: medium, large, and extra-large. The negotiated cost through the GSA contract for a size medium vest with a single plate in the mid-1990s was US$738.

== Operational history ==
Early versions of RBA (the first variant, which featured only a front plate and not a rear plate) first saw active frontline service in 1993, being used in combat in Operation Gothic Serpent (from 22 August 1993 to 13 October 1993), when Rangers of Task Force Ranger first arrived in Mogadishu, Somalia. There, it was used by the Rangers of B Company and Command and Control, 3rd Battalion, 75th Ranger Regiment. The early RBA used only a front ballistic plate for protection from small arms (rifle) fire; this did not protect some of the Rangers in Somalia from serious injury or death, such as Sergeant James Joyce, who was killed by a gunshot wound to his back.

During the 1990s, Rangers used RBA in the Balkans and in Haiti. In 1996, about 350 vests were sent to soldiers deployed in the former Yugoslavia.

Also in 1996, members of the USAF Security Forces assigned to the 91st Missile Wing at Minot AFB, North Dakota received RBA vests to replace their PASGT vests.

RBA was worn by some US Army soldiers who served in Kosovo, including soldiers from C Company, 1-187th Infantry, 101st Airborne Division; 3-504th PIR, 82nd Airborne Division; A Company 1/36 INF (MECH), 1st Armored Division; and A Company, 1-26th Infantry, 1st Infantry Division.

Sometime in 1998, 1st Squadron, 1st Cavalry Regiment (1-1 CAV), 1st Armored Division's soldiers were equipped with RBA during SFOR's Operation Joint Guard and Operation Joint Forge in Bosnia and Herzegovina. Due to the heavy weight, however, RBA vests were always kept in the back compartment of vehicles and soldiers always used PASGT vests during their peacekeeping duty.

Some soldiers from the 173rd Airborne Brigade used RBA vests during Operation Northern Delay (26 March 2003) in Kurdistan. About 1,000 parachutists from the 173rd AB Bde jumped into the Kurdish-controlled area in northern Iraq to open a northern front for US forces after the refusal by Turkey.

== Users ==
- Estonia
- United States

== See also ==
- PASGT vest
- Interceptor Body Armor
