= Ceramic armor =

Armor used by armored vehicles and in personal armor

Ceramic armor is armor used by armored vehicles and in personal armor to resist projectile penetration through its high hardness and compressive strength. In its most basic form, it consists of two primary components: A ceramic layer on the outer surface, called the "strike face," backed up by a ductile fiber reinforced plastic composite or metal layer. The role of the ceramic is to (1) fracture the projectile or deform the projectile nose upon impact, (2) erode and slow down the projectile remnant as it penetrates the shattered ceramic layer, and (3) distribute the impact load over a larger area, which can be absorbed by ductile polymer or metallic backings. Ceramics are often used where light weight is important, as they weigh less than metal alloys for a given degree of resistance. The most common materials are alumina, boron carbide, and, to a lesser extent, silicon carbide.

== History ==
Tests as early as 1918 demonstrated the potential of ceramic armor; Major Neville Monroe-Hopkins found that adding a thin layer of enamel to steel greatly improved its ballistic properties. Its first operational use was not until the Vietnam war in which helicopters frequently came under small arms fire. In 1965, ceramic body armor was given to helicopter crews, and 'hard-faced composite' armor kits were added to pilot seats. By the following year, monolithic ceramic vests and airframe-mounted armor panels had been deployed. In "Huey" helicopters, these improvements were estimated to have decreased fatalities by 53%, and non-fatal injuries by 27%.

== Design ==
Ceramic armor designs range from monolithic plates to systems employing three dimensional matrices. One of the first patents of ceramic armor was filed in 1967 by the Goodyear Aerospace Corp. It embedded alumina ceramic spheres in thin aluminum sheets, which were layered so that the spheres of each layer would fill the gaps between spheres of the surrounding layers, in a manner similar to a body-centered cubic packing structure. The entire system was held together with polyurethane foam and either thick aluminum, multi-layered UHMWPE, para-aramid fiber, or 30% PALF + 70% epoxy composite backing. This development demonstrated the effectiveness of matrix-based design, and spurred the development of other matrix-based systems. Most of these combine cylindrical, hexagonal, or spherical ceramic elements with a backing of some non-armor dedicated alloy. Monolithic plate armor, by contrast, relies on single plates of an advanced ceramic slipped into a traditional ballistic vest in place of a steel plate.

== Mechanism ==
Unlike metals, ceramics are never used alone in armor systems; they are always combined with a ductile backing or support layer of metal or fiber reinforced plastic composite materials, and this ceramic-faced assembly is called ceramic armor. Ceramic materials, like glass, have high hardness and compressive strengths but low tensile strengths. Bonding a ceramic tile to a metallic or composite backing material, with high strength and good ductility, delays or mitigates tensile failure upon impact, and forces the ceramic to fail in compression.

Ceramic armor systems defeat small arms projectiles and kinetic energy penetrators by two main mechanisms: Shattering and erosion. When a hard steel or tungsten carbide projectile hits the ceramic layer of a ceramic armor system, it is momentarily arrested, in a phenomenon known as dwell. Depending on the thickness and hardness of the ceramic layer, the projectile core is then either shattered, fractured, or blunted. The projectile's remnants continue to penetrate the comminuted ceramic tile at a reduced velocity, which erodes those remnants and reduces their energy, length, and mass. The metal or fiber reinforced plastic composite layer behind the ceramic layer then arrests the projectile's fragments or its eroded remnant, and absorbs residual kinetic energy, typically via plastic deformation. If the backing material is too thin or too weak to absorb the residual kinetic energy – or if the projectile does not shatter and the eroded projectile remnant retains too much of its mass and kinetic energy – penetration will occur. Both the ceramic layer and its backing layer are therefore of equal importance.

In vehicular ceramic armor, the backing material is most commonly structural steel, frequently rolled homogeneous armor, though aluminum is sometimes used. In body armor, where ceramic armor designers strive to make ceramic armor plates as light and as comfortable as possible, the backing material is typically a lightweight ultra high molecular weight polyethylene fiber composite, but may also be an aramid fiber composite – and, in low-end ceramic armor plates or in plates for stationary wearers such as helicopter crews, fiberglass is sometimes used.

Against high-explosive anti-tank rounds, the ceramic elements break up the geometry of the metal jet generated by the shaped charge, greatly diminishing penetration.

== Applications ==
=== Personnel ===
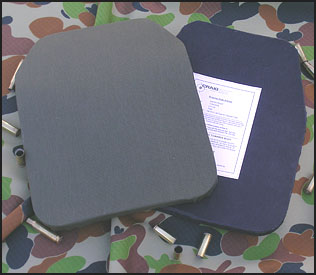
Ceramic body armor plates

Ceramic plates are commonly used as inserts in soft ballistic vests. Most ceramic plates used in body armor provide National Institute of Justice Type III protection, allowing them to stop rifle bullets. Ceramic plates are a form of composite armor. Insert plates may also be made of steel or ultra high molecular weight polyethylene.

A ceramic plate is usually slipped into the outer layer of a soft armor vest. There may be two plates, one in the front and one in the back, or one universal plate on either front or back. Some vests permit the use of small plates on the sides for additional protection.

Ceramic plates issued by the United States military are called Enhanced Small Arms Protective Inserts (ESAPI).

The approximate weight for one NIJ Level III ceramic armor plate is 4.4 to 8 pounds (2.0 to 3.6 kg) for the typical size of 10 by 12 inches (25 by 30 cm). There are other types of plates that come in different sizes and offer different levels of protection. For example, the MC-Plate (maximum coverage plate) offers 19% more coverage than a standard ceramic plate.

Ceramic materials, materials processing and progress in ceramic penetration mechanics are significant areas of academic and industrial activity. This combined field of ceramics armor research is broad and is perhaps summarized best by The American Ceramics Society. ACerS has run an annual armor conference for a number of years and compiled a proceedings 2004–2007. An area of special activity pertaining to vests is the emerging use of small ceramic components. Large torso sized ceramic plates are complex to manufacture and are subject to cracking in use. Monolithic plates also have limited multi hit capacity as a result of their large impact fracture zone These are the motivations for new types of armor plate. These new designs use two and three dimensional arrays of ceramic elements that can be rigid, flexible or semi-flexible. Dragon Skin body armor is one these systems, although it has failed numerous tests performed by the US Army, and has been rejected. European developments in spherical and hexagonal arrays have resulted in products that have some flex and multi-hit performance. The manufacture of array type systems with flex, consistent ballistic performance at edges of ceramic elements is an active area of research. In addition advanced ceramic processing techniques arrays require adhesive assembly methods. One novel approach is use of hook and loop fasteners to assemble the ceramic arrays.
