= Full Spectrum Battle Equipment Amphibious Assault Vest =

Lightweight assault vest system

The Amphibious Assault Vest, Quick-Release, or FSBE AAV QR, is a light-weight assault vest system that incorporates both protection and cargo retention. Protection includes soft armor coupled with hard ballistic inserts. Cargo retention capabilities include various pouches and pockets attached via standard PALS webbing. The entire FSBE kit includes the vest body, a throat protector, a groin protector and an assortment of load bearing pouches. A fully loaded vest with armor plates can prove quite heavy, and is typically used only in high-risk direct action (DA) missions.

The Combat Integrated Releasable Armor System (CIRAS) suite of equipment manufactured by Eagle Industries is currently the new FSBE II system, and has replaced the FSBE AAVs.

Prior to this, the FSBE series replaced the older Close Quarters Battle Equipment Assault Vest (CQBE AV) that had been used by Force Recon since 1996. This kit is available to civilians, with prices for the FSBE vest body starting at US$500. This price does not include any ancillary pouches or soft armor or hard ballistic armor inserts.

This vest was unique in its quick release system, allowing the Marine to ditch the entire vest very quickly in case of emergency. This quick release feature, also used with newer modular plate carriers such as the Paraclete Releasable Assault Vest, was developed in response to a 9 December 1999 CH-46E Sea Knight helicopter crash over the Pacific. Several members of 5th Platoon, 1st Force Reconnaissance Company drowned because they could not eject their heavy armor in time to swim away. Only one Marine was able to successfully ditch his equipment and survive. The FSBE vests are manufactured by Point Blank Armor (US), but Recon operators purchase additional modular load bearing pouches from a number of manufacturers.

== See also ==
- Combat Integrated Releasable Armor System
- Tactical Vest Antenna System
- Modular Body Armor Vest
