= Modular Body Armor Vest =

Body armor vest developed by Eagle Industries

- Type: Plate carrier
- Place of origin: United States

Service history
- In service: 2000s–2010s
- Used by: United States Armed Forces
- Wars: War in Afghanistan, Iraq War

Production history
- Designer: Eagle Industries
- Manufacturer: Eagle Industries
- Produced: 2000s

Specifications
- Weight: 16 lb (7.3 kg)

The Modular Body Armor Vest (MBAV) is a bullet-proof vest made by Eagle Industries and used by the United States military. The vest is standard issue for many members of the United States special operations forces including the 75th Ranger Regiment. 10,000 vests were deployed on an interim basis with the U.S. Marine Corps while it developed the Scalable Plate Carrier. The vest was also evaluated by the U.S. Army.

== Design ==
The vest has removable Small Arms Protective Insert plates. The MBAV does not offer as much coverage as the Improved Outer Tactical Vest (IOTV). The vest weighs 16 lb (7.3 kg), averaging about 13 lb (5.9 kg) lighter than the IOTV. Lighter armor, which offers greater mobility, has become a priority due to the rugged terrain of Afghanistan. It is only meant to protect the vital areas with armored plates, instead covering non-vital areas with soft armor.

== History ==
The vest has been standard issue for many members of the American SOF operators including the 75th Ranger Regiment. Those 10,000 vests were deployed on an interim basis with the U.S. Marine Corps while it developed the Scalable Plate Carrier. 500 vests were intended to be evaluated by the U.S. Army for two months beginning in April 2009 in Afghanistan. Army acquisition officials delayed the assessment to complete additional safety testing. Three-dozen airborne troops took part in Soldier Protection Demonstration VII at Yuma Proving Ground in May 2009. The soldiers analyzed eight plate carrier vests including the MBAV. A different plate carrier was selected for procurement.

== See also ==
- Full Spectrum Battle Equipment Amphibious Assault Vest
- Combat Integrated Releasable Armor System
- Tactical Vest Antenna System
- Soldier Plate Carrier System
