= Tactical Vest Antenna System =

Wearable radio antenna

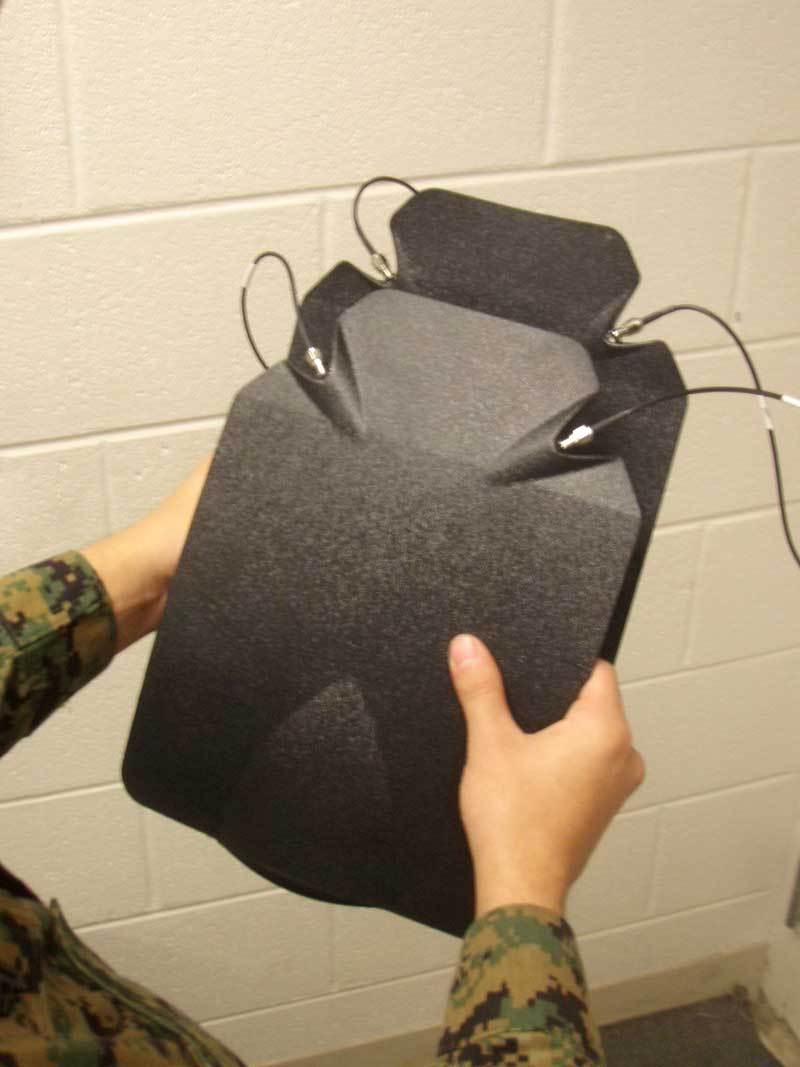

Specifications
- Frequency: 30–512 MHz
- Gain: -10 dBi at 30.00 MHz
- Power Input: 7 watt
- Weight: 9 ounces (260 g)
- Radiating Pattern: Omnidirectional
- Characteristic impedance: 50 Ω
- Connector: TNC / BNC

Tactical Vest Antenna System (TVAS) is a type of wearable antenna designed for use by the United States Armed Forces. It is claimed that troops equipped with the TVAS are more effective than those equipped with conventional whip antennas due to better concealment of the equipment and improved mobility of the operator. TVAS was developed by Wearable Antenna Technologies Inc. in early 2008.

== Implementation ==
The Tactical Vest Antenna System is designed to be concealed within Small Arms Protective Insert pouches found on contemporary body armor such as Interceptor body armor, Modular Tactical Vest, Full Spectrum Battle Equipment, Combat Integrated Releasable Armor System, Modular Body Armor Vest and virtually any other type of body armor that utilizes SAPI or ESAPI plates. The radiating elements' placement is barely noticeable due to their thinness, approximately 1/8 inch (0.32 cm) and their curved shape that lies flush against the shape of ESAPI plates. Hiding away the radiating elements brings more mobility to the operator when compared to whip antennas traditionally used by the military. TVAS is compatible with AN/PRC-148 MBITR, AN/PRC-152, and other common radios used by the U.S. military.

== Safety ==
If power is increased over 7 watts there could be safety issues with temperature increase. However, at the operating frequencies of the antenna, ionizing radiation is not a factor. Additionally, the antenna is intended to be placed on the outside of SAPI plates, providing a significant barrier between the radiating element and the operator.

== Technical details ==
The Tactical Vest Antenna System consists of two radiating elements that are connected by a cable. The cable acts as an extension of the radiating elements, and includes a "quick release" mechanism found in MTV and FSBE designs. Each of the radiating elements of the antenna is laminated between two sheets of polycarbonate plastic.

== See also ==
- Joint Electronics Type Designation System (JETDS) – unclassified designation system for identifying electronic equipment
- SINCGARS – Combat net radio 30 to 88 MHz
- AN/PRC-148 – handheld multiband, tactical software-defined radio 30 to 512 MHz
- AN/PRC-152 – portable, compact, tactical software-defined combat-net radio 30 to 512 MHz
