= Combat Integrated Releasable Armor System =

Protective vest in the US military

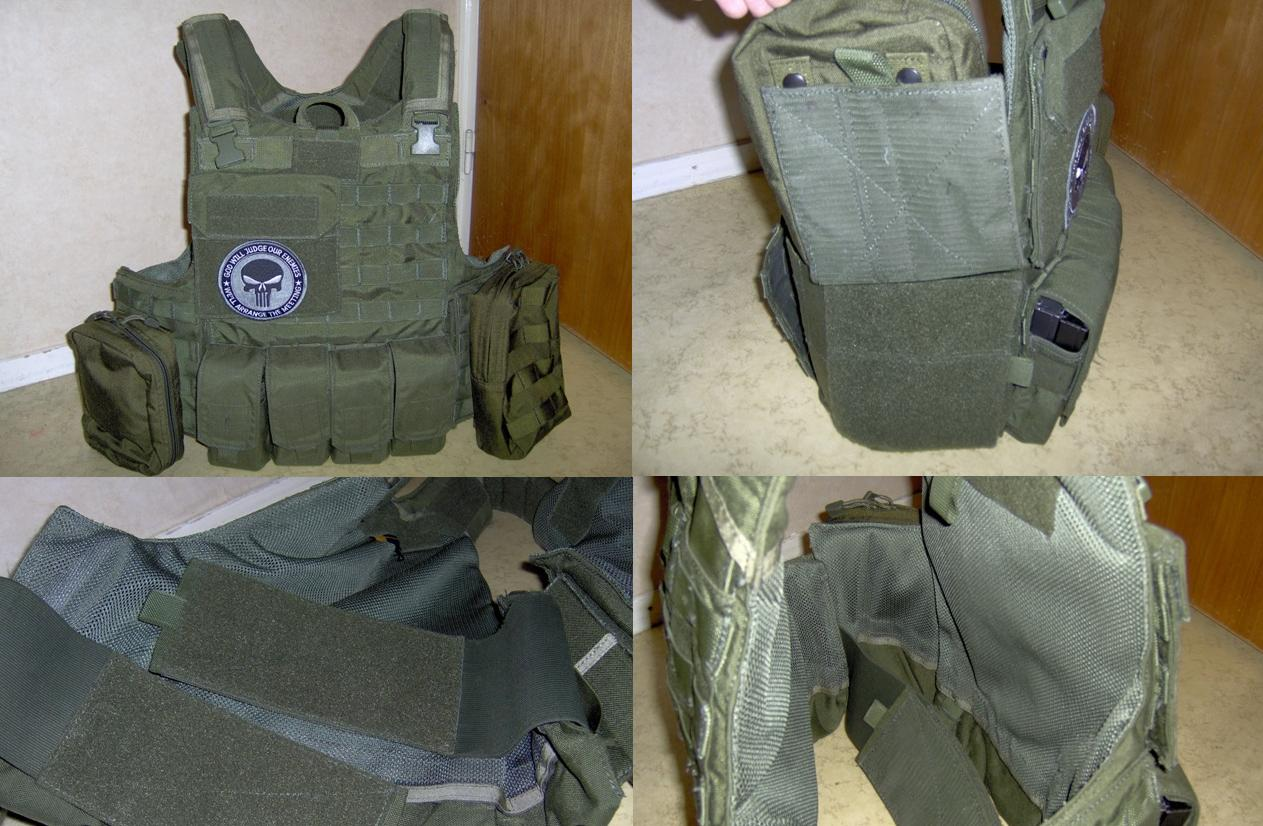
A CIRAS Maritime type replica

CIRAS (Combat Integrated Releasable Armor System) is a modular protective vest designed for US Special Operations Forces by Eagle Industries. The vest is currently the new FSBE II system and has replaced the FSBE AAVs. It features PALS webbing, making it MOLLE-compatible and allowing the attachment of various pouches or accessories. Two versions of the vest are available, known as the "land" and "maritime" versions. The vest consists of front and rear panels with pockets for BALCS or SPEAR-cut soft armor panels and standard-issue SAPI (Small Arms Protective Insert) plates. This gives the wearer up to NIJ Level IV protection on the front and back and Level IIIA protection on the sides. On the lower rear side of the front of the vest, there are two quick-releasable buckles for attaching groin protection. The wearer's sides are covered by an external cummerbund, which is also covered with PALS webbing. The vest body is constructed of 1000-denier Cordura Nylon, and the interior is lined with heavy-duty mesh to aid in cooling the wearer.

The difference between the “Land” and “Maritime” versions is how the outer cummerbund is attached at the front and where the quick-release handle is located. Both comes with an internal cummerbund which overlaps across the stomach and is secured with Velcro. The "Maritime" version has a solid center panel and two side flaps with Velcro panels underneath of them. Each side of the cummerbund attaches to the Velcro on its corresponding side. The release handle is located at the top of the front panel near the wearer's neck which allows ambidextrous use. This version provides the wearer with a wide, uninterrupted section of webbing on the center of the vest which allows pouches for multiple magazines to be placed on the center of the body for easy access. On the Land version the external cummerbund wraps around and overlaps over the user's stomach and is secured under a single center flap rather than the two side flaps of the "Maritime" version. The release handle on the "Land" vest is located on the left side of the front panel, just above where the cummerbund wraps around. This version breaks up the amount of continuous webbing on the user's front, but allows the vest to be fitted with a different cummerbund which has additional pockets for 6x8" side plates. The addition of these plates can bring the vest of to full Level IV protection for the entire torso, meaning the vest can stop rifle rounds from all sides instead of just front and back.

Additionally, both the "Land" and "Maritime" versions can be fitted with extra coverage for the neck, biceps, deltoids, and, as previously mentioned, the groin area. These inserts provide up to Level IIIA coverage except for the groin which has a Level IV plate available.

Critiques of this vest include its weight when fully loaded with plates and inserts, its lack of "breathing" due to its coverage, and difficulty donning the vest by oneself.

There are khaki, ranger green, olive drab, black, coyote brown, UCP, and MultiCam color variations for the CIRAs, and the manufacturer number for consumer goods does not have a contract number.

The MAR-CIRAS is the armor carrier of choice for USSOCOM (BALCS-R), such as Army Rangers who use the Ranger Green CIRAS. Many SEAL operators use the Khaki Maritime MAR-CIRAS.

The United States Marine Corps Force Reconnaissance operators use the CIRAS (Both Land or Maritime versions) during different missions.

== Release feature ==
Both versions of the CIRAS come with a quick-release cable; with a pull of the handle, a steel cable holding the cummerbund and shoulder straps in place is released, allowing rapid vest removal. This is utilized for decontamination procedures, medical access needs, and water emergencies where the vest's weight can cause the wearer to drown unless removed quickly. This last reason was the primary initiative behind the design of quick-release vests as a helicopter crash in 1999 led to several US Marines drowning because they could not remove all their layers of armor and load-bearing equipment fast enough. This is also described under the Full Spectrum Battle Equipment Amphibious Assault Vest entry, from which the CIRAS was developed. When this vest was introduced, it was a unique feature, but it has since been replicated on several other vests. The current vest uses a simplified system to attach and release the vest components, making reassembly quicker and easier. The vest's pull handle is secured with a Velcro loop to avoid accidental pulling.

== Users ==
- Armenia: Limited use by the Armed Forces of Armenia.
- Chile: Chilean Marine Corps
- Iraq
- Lebanon
- Turkey: Special Forces Command used CIRAS type vests.
- United States

== See also ==
Modular Body Armor Vest

Tactical Vest Antenna System

United States Marine Corps Force Reconnaissance
