= Aluminium oxide nanoparticle =

Nanomaterial

Nanosized aluminium oxide (nanosized alumina) occurs in the form of spherical or nearly spherical nanoparticles, and in the form of oriented or undirected fibers.

== Properties ==
Properties, of the final material, defined as the set of properties of the solid aluminium oxide and specific properties of nanostructures.

=== Nanoscale colloidal alumina particles ===
Nanoscale colloidal alumina particles are characterized by a small diameter of the particles/fibers (2–10 nm) and a high specific surface area (>100 m^{2}/g). They also exhibit high defectiveness of the material surface and specific structure of the nanoparticles (the volume and size of pores, degree of crystallinity, phase composition, structure, and composition of the surface — modification possibility).

=== Nanoscale fibers of aluminium oxide ===
Nanoscale fibers of aluminium oxide are characterized by a length-diameter ratio of about 20,000,000:1, a high degree of orientation of the fibers, weak interaction of the fibers among themselves, an absence of surface pores, and a high surface concentration of hydroxyl groups.

== Production ==
=== Nanoscale aluminium oxide powders ===
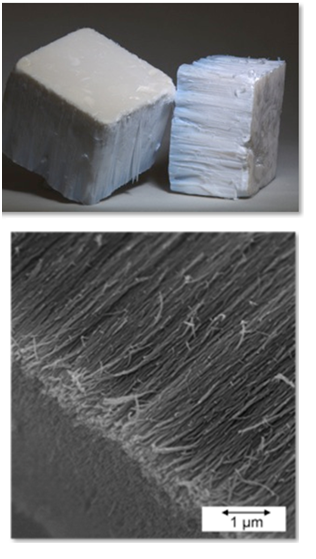
Industrially obtained alumina nano fibers of Nafen brand

Nanoscale aluminium oxide powders can be obtained by grinding powdered alumina particles of a nanometer level (for example, 10–50 nm). For example, using a planetary mill using grinding bodies of size less than 0.1 μm.

They can also be produced by the thermal decomposition of freshly synthesized AlOOH or Al(OH)_{3} to aluminium oxide. The sooner of the temperature of decomposition of the hydroxo-compounds of aluminium is achieved, the smaller the resulting nanoparticles.

=== Alumina nano fibers ===
The oxidation of the surface of some liquid metal alloys leads to the formation of loose or porous 3D nanostructures. This effect was first observed over 100 years ago in an aluminium-mercury system. Such fibers do not occur in nature and only grown by artificial means. Various nanostructures can be produced depending on the method of synthesis, such as aerogel from oxyhydroxide aluminium (AlOOH or Al_{2}O_{3}·nH_{2}O, where 1 ≤ n ≤ 4, are easily turned into aluminium oxide) or nano-fibers of aluminium oxide (Al_{2}O_{3}).

At this moment, the main ways of production are:

1. Selective oxidation of aluminium on the surface of molten Ga-AI in a humid atmosphere at a temperature of 20 to 70 °C (Method of IPCE RAS).
2. Liquid metal synthesis of nanostructural aerogel AlOOH from molten Ga-Bi and Al-Al (Institute of RF IPPE named after A. I. Leipunsky, Obninsk city).
3. Growing fibers on the surface of the aluminum melt (a method of industrial synthesis, developed and patented by the ANF Technology).

== Applications ==
=== Adsorbent ===
Aluminium oxide nanoparticles are used an adsorbent to capture hydrocarbon impurities from the air.

They also find use in brightening solutions in sugar production, trapping solvents, and adsorption purification of oils (first transformer).

The ability of aluminum oxide to chemoselectively capture fluorine ions is used for the purification of water with increased fluorine content, vapor recovery of hydrogen fluoride from gases of super phosphate, and electrolysis.

In chromatography, they find use as an adsorbent for gas and liquid adsorption chromatography, ion-exchange and sediment-sorption chromatography in aqueous solution, and as an inert carrier during liquid-distribution chromatography.

=== Dessiccant ===
Aluminium oxide nanoparticles can dry gases to dew points of −60 °C and below as well as preserve instruments and equipment.

They are used in systems such as respiratory valves, tanks, transformers, etc. to create protective atmospheres during long-term storage of food and pharmaceutical products.

=== Sorbent ===
Aluminium oxide nanoparticles can sorb the ions of metals from solutions of their salts, for example, CsNO_{3}, AgNO_{3}, Ba(NO_{3})_{2}, Sr(NO_{3})_{2}, Pb(NO_{3})_{2}, etc., with the possibility of obtaining of metal oxides on the surface of the fibers during annealing.

They are also used as a sorbent for radionuclides in nuclear power plant wastewaters.

=== Catalysis ===
Aluminium oxide nanoparticles are used as a catalyst and carrier of catalysts. Nanoscale oxide due to the small diameter of the particles/fibers, high specific surface area and activity associated with the defects, and the specific structure of the nanoparticles (the volume and size of pores, degree of crystallinity, phase composition, structure, and composition of the surface) strongly enhances the catalytic properties, and increases the range of massive aluminium oxide as a catalyst.

=== Other ===
Aluminium oxide nanoparticles can act as an inert (reinforcing) filler.

They find use in ceramics and composites (including composite metals), adding high toughness, fire resistance, anti-friction properties, and insulating properties. Their use is known in several products such as burner discharge lamps, the substrates of integrated circuits, shut-off elements ceramic pipeline valves, and prostheses.

They are used as an abrasive for ultra-fine polishing.

They are used as a refectory material (high-temperature component for heat insulation).

== See also ==
- Aluminium oxide
- Corundum

== Literature ==
1. Wislicenus, H. Zeitschrift für chemie und industrie der kolloide Kolloid-Z 2 (1908): XI-XX.
2. Vignes, J-L. Mazerolle, L., Michel, D. Key Engineering Materials 132-136 (1997): 432 – 435.
3. Zhu, Huai Yong, James D. Riches, and John C. Barry. γ-alumina nanofibers prepared from aluminum hydrate with poly (ethylene oxide) surfactant // Chemistry of Materials 14.5 (2002): 2086–2093
4. Azad, Abdul-Majeed. Fabrication of transparent alumina (Al_{2}O_{3}) nanofibers by electrospinning // Materials Science and Engineering: A 435 (2006): 468–473.
5. Teoh, Geik Ling, Kong Yong Liew, and Wan AK Mahmood. Synthesis and characterization of sol–gel alumina nanofibers // Journal of Sol-Gel Science and Technology 44.3 (2007): 177–186.
6. В, Петрова Е.; Ф, Дресвянников А.; А, Цыганова М.; М, Губайдуллина А.; В, Власов В.; Г, Исламова Г. (2008). "E. V. Petrova, A. F. Dresvyannikov, M. A. Tsyganov, Gubaidullina A. M., Vlasov V. V., Islamov G. G. nanoparticles of hydroxides and oxides of aluminium, obtained by electrochemical and chemical methods // Bulletin of Kazan Technological University. 2008. (Date accessed 10.04.2017)". Вестник Казанского Технологического Университета (6): 55–67.
