= Plasma electrolytic oxidation =

Surface-treatment process for metals

Plasma electrolytic oxidation (PEO), also known as electrolytic plasma oxidation (EPO) or microarc oxidation (MAO), is an electrochemical surface treatment process for generating oxide coatings on metals. It is similar to anodizing, but it employs higher potentials, so that discharges occur and the resulting plasma modifies the structure of the oxide layer. This process can be used to grow thick (tens or hundreds of micrometers), largely crystalline, oxide coatings on metals such as aluminium, magnesium and titanium. Because they can present high hardness and a continuous barrier, these coatings can offer protection against wear, corrosion or heat as well as electrical insulation.

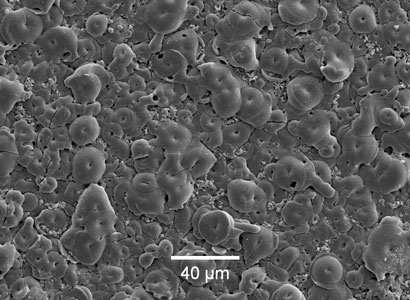
A typical PEO surface on aluminium, as viewed in an SEM.

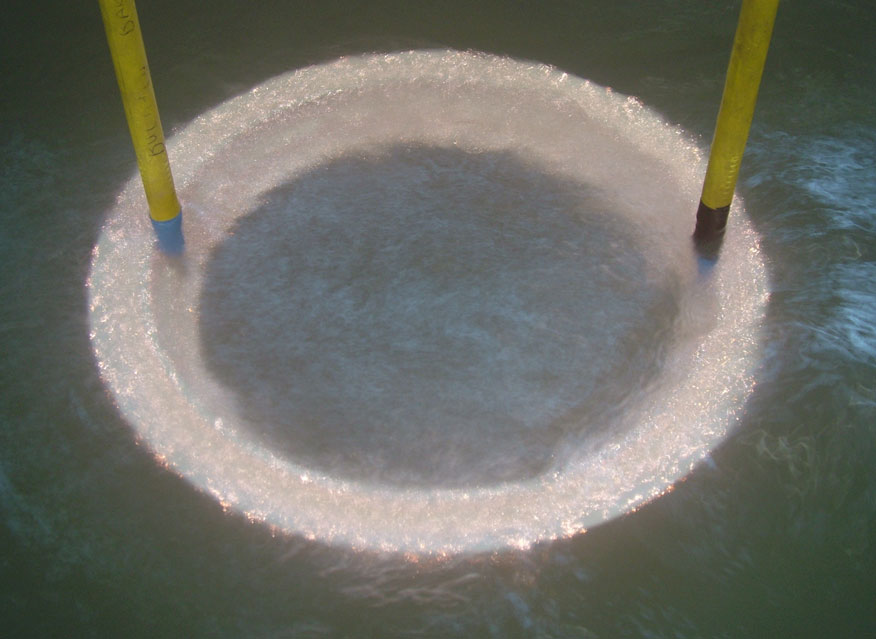
A yacht winch drum undergoing PEO processing. Below; a finished winch drum installed on a yacht.

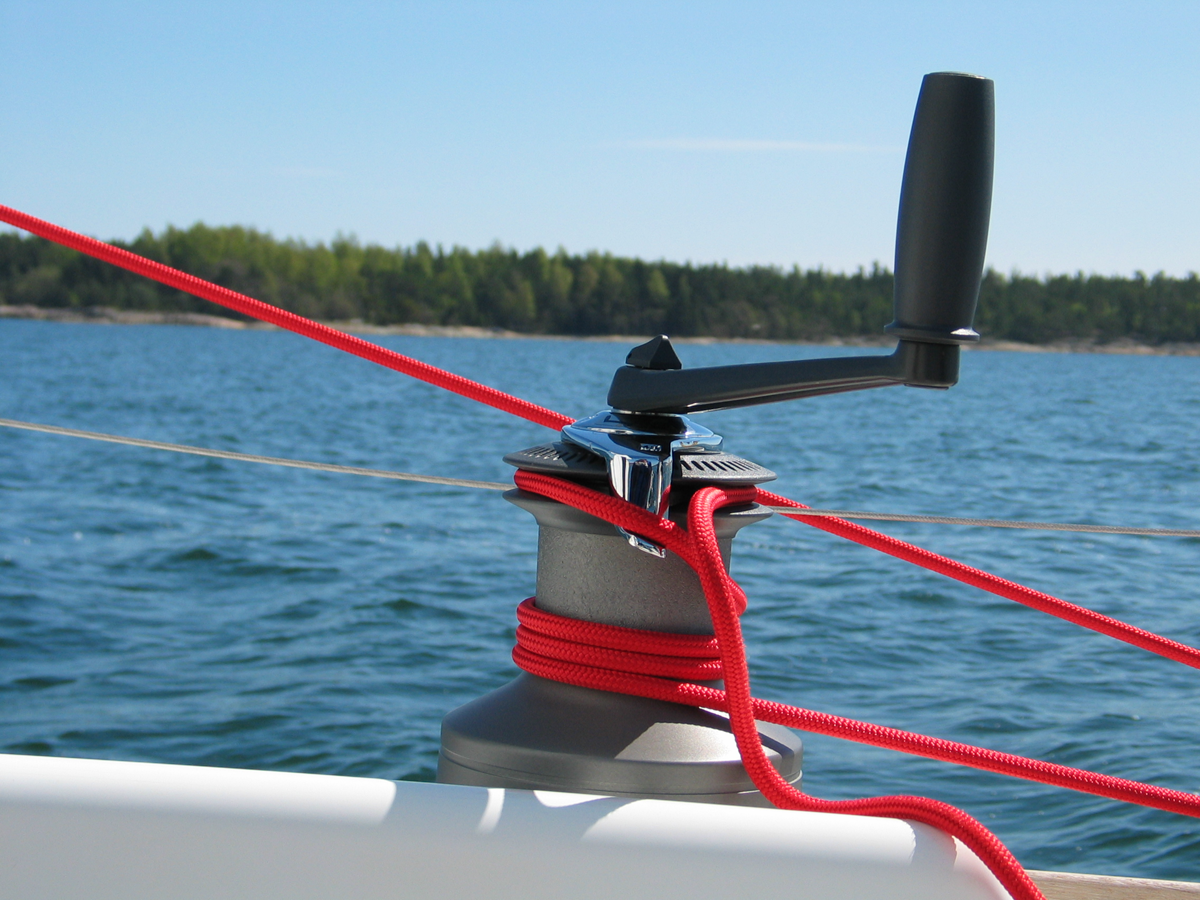

The coating is a chemical conversion of the substrate metal into its oxide, and grows both inwards and outwards from the original metal surface. Because it grows inward into the substrate, it has excellent adhesion to the substrate metal. A wide range of substrate alloys can be coated, including all wrought aluminum alloys and most cast alloys, although high levels of silicon can reduce coating quality.

The coating morphology and composition resulting from plasma electrolytic oxidation is largely dependent on the PEO parameters, including voltage, current density, and the electrolytic solution employed.

== Process ==
Metals such as aluminum naturally form a passivating oxide layer which provides moderate protection against corrosion. The layer is strongly adherent to the metal surface, and it will regrow quickly if scratched off. In conventional anodizing, this layer of oxide is grown on the surface of the metal by the application of electrical potential, while the part is immersed in an acidic electrolyte.

In plasma electrolytic oxidation, higher potentials are applied. For example, in the plasma electrolytic oxidation of aluminum, at least 200 V must be applied. This locally exceeds the dielectric breakdown potential of the growing oxide film, and discharges occur. These discharges result in localized plasma reactions, with conditions of high temperature and pressure which modify the growing oxide. Processes include melting, melt-flow, re-solidification, sintering and densification of the growing oxide. One of the most significant effects, is that the oxide is partially converted from amorphous alumina into crystalline forms such as corundum (α-Al_{2}O_{3}) which is much harder. As a result, mechanical properties such as wear resistance and toughness are enhanced.

=== Equipment used ===
The part to be coated is immersed in a bath of electrolyte which usually consists of a dilute alkaline solution such as KOH. It is electrically connected, so as to become one of the electrodes in the electrochemical cell, with the other "counter-electrode" typically being made from an inert material such as stainless steel, and often consisting of the wall of the bath itself.

Potentials of over 200 V are applied between these two electrodes. These may be continuous or pulsed direct current (DC) (in which case the part is simply an anode in DC operation), or alternating pulses (alternating current or "pulsed bi-polar" operation) where the stainless steel counter electrode might just be earthed.

== Coating properties ==
One of the remarkable features of plasma electrolyte coatings is the presence of micro pores and cracks on the coating surface. Plasma electrolytic oxide coatings are generally recognized for high hardness, wear resistance, and corrosion resistance. However, the coating properties are highly dependent on the substrate used, as well as on the composition of the electrolyte and the electrical regime used (see 'Equipment used' section, above).

Even on aluminium, the coating properties can vary strongly according to the exact alloy composition. For instance, the hardest coatings can be achieved on 2XXX series aluminium alloys, where the highest proportion of crystalline phase corundum (α-Al_{2}O_{3}) is formed, resulting in hardnesses of ~2000 HV, whereas coatings on the 5XXX series have less of this important constituent and are hence softer. Extensive work is being pursued by Prof. T. W. Clyne at the University of Cambridge to investigate the fundamental electrical and plasma physical processes involved in this process, having previously elucidated some of the micromechanical (& pore architectural), mechanical and thermal characteristics of PEO coatings.
