= Kevlar KM2 =

Kevlar KM2 is a synthetic para-aramid fiber produced by DuPont. The fiber is an evolution of the original Kevlar fiber, that first became available between 1992 and 1998. Kevlar KM2 (705) has been replaced with Kevlar KM2+ (775), a slightly lighter and thinner material with improved strength. Their applications are otherwise the same.

The following quotes summarize Kevlar KM2's properties:

"DuPont created Kevlar KM2 to achieve the performance goals defined by casualty reduction testing for the United States Department of Defense. Today it is used extensively for fragmentation protection in the U.S. military. Helmets and vests made with Kevlar KM2 provide enhanced bullet and fragmentation resistance while remaining comfortable and breathable in inhospitable climates.

Excellent thermal stability at temperature extremes, water repellency, chemical stability and resistance to petroleum products have made Kevlar KM2 an indispensable asset to the military personnel who use it every day."

Various information on fabric products is available from DuPont's website with the Kevlar type used listed. The website formerly had a PDF available detailing tests that proved that KM2 was "drier", "cooler", and "more flexible" than the Kevlar used in "PASGT" (Kevlar 29).

Kevlar KM2 is described as being for "Bullets/Fragments" and is marketed towards military use, while Kevlar Protera is for "Bullets / Blunt Trauma" and law enforcement use. This indicates that KM2 is about as advanced as Protera, but has different mechanical properties.

Dupont reports that testing shows that KM2 can provide the same protection as earlier systems for 35% less weight.

== Applications / Usage ==
According to Dupont, the Ranger Vest first produced in 1992 used KM2 fiber. The Interceptor Vest, also used KM2.

In a V50 test using a "0.22 caliber, Type 2, 17-grain fragment-simulating projectile; MIL-STD-662E", the PASGT Vest has a rating of 1650 feet per second, but the Ranger Vest has a rating of 2100 feet per second. This is extremely close to the "25%' improvement reported on the Dupont website.
