= Aluminium oxide (data page) =

Chemical data page

This page provides supplementary chemical data on aluminium oxide.

== Material Safety Data Sheet ==
- SIRI
- Science Stuff

== Structure and properties ==
Structure and properties
Dielectric constant, ε_{11}=ε_{22}	9.34 ε_{0} at 25 °C
Dielectric constant, ε_{33}	11.54 ε_{0} at 25 °C
Bond strength	?
Bond length	?
Bond angle	?
Magnetic susceptibility	?

Table of Refractive index
Wavelength(μm)	n_{o}	n_{e}
0.193	1.92879	1.91743
0.213	1.88903	1.87839
0.222	1.8754	1.86504
0.226	1.87017	1.85991
0.244	1.85059	1.84075
0.248	1.84696	1.83719
0.257	1.83932	1.82972
0.266	1.83304	1.82358
0.280	1.82437	1.81509
0.308	1.81096	1.80198
0.325	1.80467	1.79582
0.337	1.80082	1.79206
0.351	1.79693	1.78825
0.355	1.79598	1.78732
0.442	1.78038	1.77206
0.458	1.77843	1.77015
0.488	1.7753	1.76711
0.515	1.77304	1.76486
0.532	1.7717	1.76355
0.590	1.76804	1.75996
0.633	1.7659	1.75787
0.670	1.76433	1.75632
0.694	1.76341	1.75542
0.755	1.76141	1.75346
0.780	1.76068	1.75274
0.800	1.76013	1.7522
0.820	1.75961	1.75168
0.980	1.75607	1.74819
1.064	1.75449	1.74663
1.320	1.75009	1.74227
1.550	1.74618	1.73838
2.010	1.73748	1.72973
2.24929	1.73232	1.72432
2.703	1.719	1.711
2.941	1.712	1.704
3.333	1.701	1.693
3.704	1.687	1.679
4.000	1.674	1.666
4.348	1.658	1.65
4.762	1.636	1.628
5.000	1.623	1.615
5.263	1.607	1.599

Table of Coefficients of Sellmeier equation
Coefficient	for ordinary wave	for extraordinary wave
B_{1}	1.43134930	1.5039759
B_{2}	6.5054713×10^{−1}	5.5069141×10^{−1}
B_{3}	5.3414021	6.5937379
C_{1}	5.2799261^{−3}μm^{2}	5.48041129^{−3}μm^{2}
C_{2}	1.42382647^{−2}μm^{2}	1.47994281^{−2}μm^{2}
C_{3}	3.25017834^{2}μm^{2}	4.0289514^{2}μm^{2}

== Thermodynamic properties ==
Phase behavior
Solid properties
Liquid properties
Std enthalpy change of formation, Δ_{f}H^{~~o~~}_{liquid}	-1620.57 kJ/mol
Standard molar entropy, S^{~~o~~}_{liquid}	67.24 J/(mol K)
Heat capacity, c_{p}	192.5 J/(mol K)
Gas properties
Std enthalpy change of formation, Δ_{f}H^{~~o~~}_{gas}	? kJ/mol
Standard molar entropy, S^{~~o~~}_{gas}	? J/(mol K)
Heat capacity, c_{p}	? J/(mol K)
