= Aluminium oxide =

Chemical compound

Aluminium(III) oxide (Aluminium oxide)
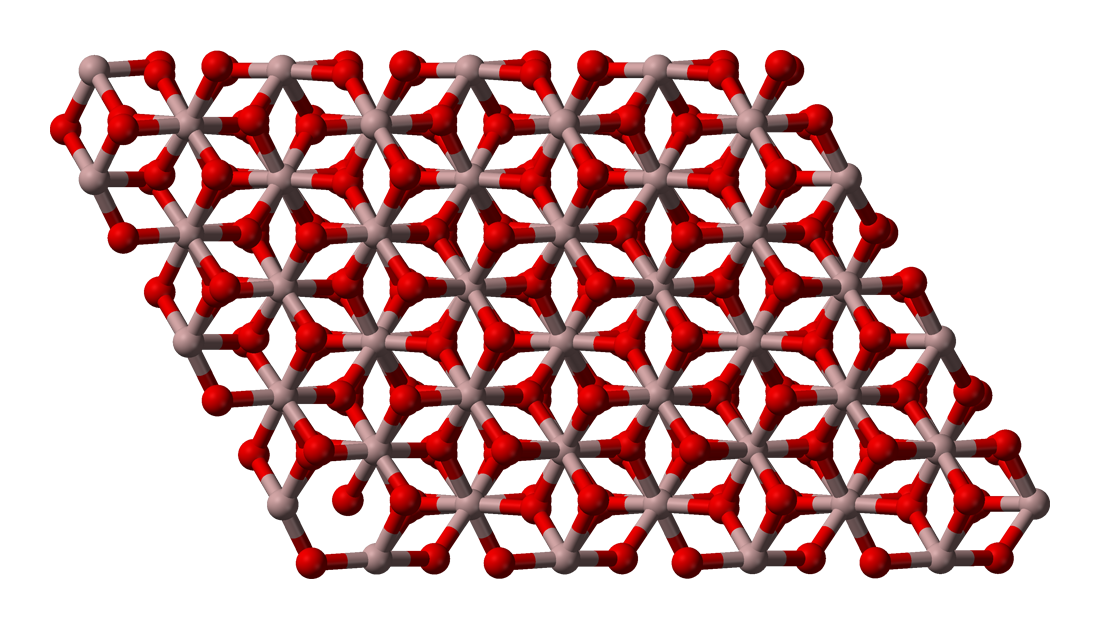

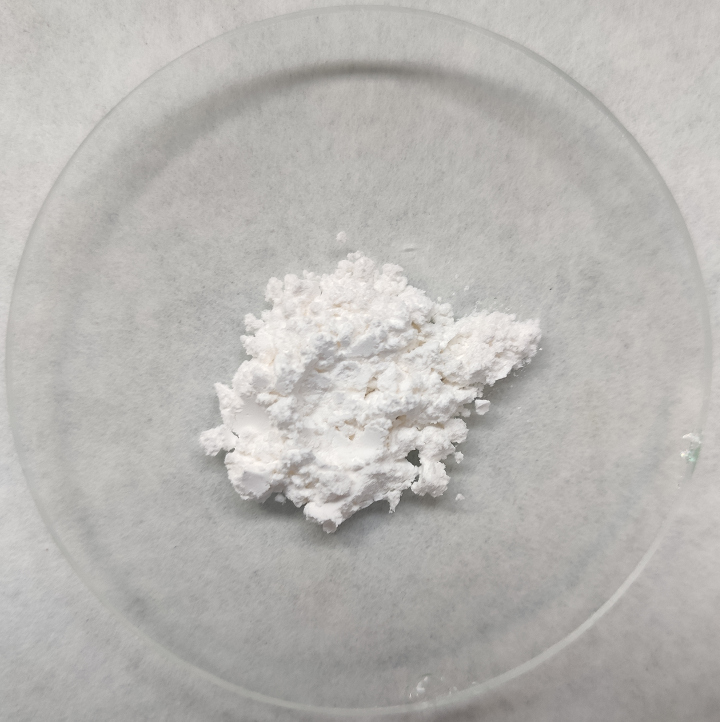

Names
- IUPAC name Aluminium oxide
- Systematic IUPAC name Aluminium(III) oxide
- Other names: Dialuminium trioxide; Aluminium sesquioxide

Identifiers
CAS Number	1344-28-1
3D model (JSmol)	Interactive image; Interactive image
ChEMBL	ChEMBL3707210
ChemSpider	8164808
DrugBank	DB11342
ECHA InfoCard	100.014.265
EC Number	215-691-6
PubChem CID	9989226
RTECS number	BD120000
UNII	LMI26O6933
CompTox Dashboard (EPA)	DTXSID1052791
- InChI: InChI=1S/2Al.3O/q2*+3;3*-2 Key: PNEYBMLMFCGWSK-UHFFFAOYSA-N; InChI=1/2Al.3O/q2*+3;3*-2 Key: PNEYBMLMFCGWSK-UHFFFAOYAC
- SMILES: [Al+3].[Al+3].[O-2].[O-2].[O-2]; [O-2].[O-2].[O-2].[Al+3].[Al+3]

Properties
Chemical formula	Al_{2}O_{3}
Molar mass	101.960 g·mol^{−1}
Appearance	white solid
Odor	odorless
Density	3.987 g/cm^{3}
Melting point	2,072 °C (3,762 °F; 2,345 K)
Boiling point	2,977 °C (5,391 °F; 3,250 K)
Solubility in water	insoluble
Solubility	insoluble in all solvents
log P	0.31860
Magnetic susceptibility (χ)	−37.0×10^{−6} cm^{3}/mol
Thermal conductivity	30 W·m^{−1}·K^{−1}
Refractive index (n_{D})	n_{ω} = 1.768–1.772 n_{ε} = 1.760–1.763; Birefringence 0.008

Structure
Crystal structure	Trigonal, hR30
Space group	R3̅c (No. 167)
Lattice constant	a = 478.5 pm, c = 1299.1 pm
Coordination geometry	octahedral

Thermochemistry
Heat capacity (C)	89.7248 J/(mol K)
Std molar entropy (S^{⦵}_{298})	50.92 J·mol^{−1}·K^{−1}
Std enthalpy of formation (Δ_{f}H^{⦵}_{298})	−1675.7 kJ/mol

Pharmacology
ATC code	D10AX04 (WHO)

Hazards
- GHS labelling
Pictograms	(GHS07: Exclamation mark)
NFPA 704 (fire diamond)	0 0 0
Flash point	Non-flammable
- NIOSH (US health exposure limits)
PEL (Permissible)	OSHA 15 mg/m^{3} (total dust); OSHA 5 mg/m^{3} (respirable fraction); ACGIH/TLV 10 mg/m^{3}
REL (Recommended)	none
IDLH (Immediate danger)	N.D.

Related compounds
Other anions	aluminium hydroxide aluminium sulfide aluminium selenide aluminium telluride
Other cations	boron trioxide gallium(III) oxide indium oxide thallium(III) oxide

Supplementary data page
- Aluminium oxide (data page)
- Except where otherwise noted, data are given for materials in their standard state (at 25 °C [77 °F], 100 kPa). verify (what is ?) Infobox references

Aluminium oxide (or aluminium(III) oxide) is a chemical compound of aluminium and oxygen with the chemical formula Al_{2}O_{3}. It is the most commonly occurring of several aluminium oxides, and specifically identified as aluminium oxide. It is commonly called alumina and may also be called aloxide, aloxite, ALOX or alundum in various forms and applications. Alumina is refined from bauxite. It occurs naturally in its crystalline polymorphic phase α-Al_{2}O_{3} as the mineral corundum, varieties of which form the precious gemstones ruby and sapphire, which have an alumina content approaching 100%. Al_{2}O_{3} is used as feedstock to produce aluminium metal, as an abrasive owing to its hardness, and as a refractory material owing to its high melting point.

== Natural occurrence ==
Corundum is the most common naturally occurring crystalline form of aluminium oxide. Rubies and sapphires are gem-quality forms of corundum, which owe their characteristic colours to trace impurities. Rubies are given their characteristic deep red colour and their laser properties by traces of chromium. Sapphires come in different colours given by various other impurities, such as iron and titanium. An extremely rare delta form occurs as the mineral deltalumite. Although aluminium is the most abundant metal in the Earth's crust, it must be extracted from bauxite as alumina to produce aluminium metal.

== History ==
The field of aluminium oxide ceramics has a long history. Aluminium salts were widely used in ancient and medieval alchemy. Several vintage textbooks cover the history of the field.

== Properties ==
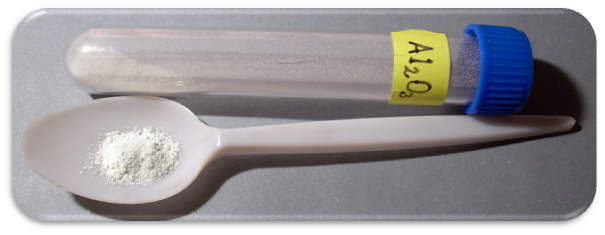
Aluminium oxide in its powdered form

Al_{2}O_{3} is an electrical insulator but has a relatively high thermal conductivity (30 Wm^{−1}K^{−1}) for a ceramic material. Aluminium oxide is insoluble in water. In its most commonly occurring crystalline form, called corundum or α-aluminium oxide, its hardness makes it suitable for use as an abrasive and as a component in cutting tools.

Aluminium oxide is responsible for the resistance of metallic aluminium to weathering. Metallic aluminium is very reactive with atmospheric oxygen, and a thin passivation layer of aluminium oxide (~5 nm thickness) forms on any exposed aluminium surface almost instantly. This layer protects the metal from further oxidation. The thickness and properties of this oxide layer can be enhanced using a process called anodising. A number of alloys, such as aluminium bronzes, exploit this property by including a proportion of aluminium in the alloy to enhance corrosion resistance. The aluminium oxide generated by anodising is typically amorphous, but discharge-assisted oxidation processes such as plasma electrolytic oxidation result in a significant proportion of crystalline aluminium oxide in the coating, enhancing its hardness.

Aluminium oxide was taken off the United States Environmental Protection Agency's chemicals lists in 1988. Aluminium oxide is on the EPA's Toxics Release Inventory list if it is a fibrous form.

=== Amphoteric nature ===
Aluminium oxide is an amphoteric substance, meaning it can react with both acids and bases, such as hydrofluoric acid and sodium hydroxide, acting as an acid with a base and a base with an acid, neutralising the other and producing a salt.

Al_{2}O_{3} + 6 HF → 2 AlF_{3} + 3 H_{2}O
Al_{2}O_{3} + 2 NaOH + 3 H_{2}O → 2 NaAl(OH)_{4} (sodium aluminate)

== Structure ==
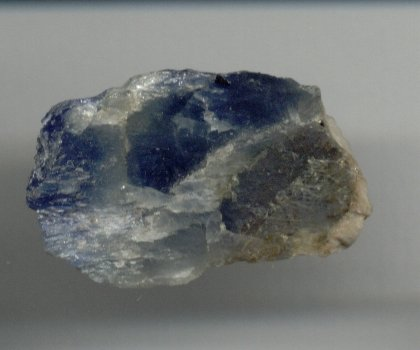
Corundum from Brazil, size about 2×3 cm.

The most common form of crystalline aluminium oxide is known as corundum, which is the thermodynamically stable form. The oxygen ions form a nearly hexagonal close-packed structure with the aluminium ions filling two-thirds of the octahedral interstices. Each Al^{3+} center is octahedral. In terms of its crystallography, corundum adopts a trigonal Bravais lattice with a space group of R3̅c (number 167 in the International Tables). The primitive cell contains two formula units of aluminium oxide. Each aluminum ion is coordinated by six oxygen ions, which results in a dense atomic arrangement. Although corundum is classified as an ionic compound, the bonds are strengthened by partial covalent bonding between aluminum and oxygen.

Aluminium oxide also exists in other metastable phases, including the cubic γ and η phases, the monoclinic λ, θ, θ', and θ″ phase, the hexagonal χ phase, the orthorhombic κ phase the orthorhombic δ phase and the δ' tetragonal phase. Each has a unique crystal structure and properties. Cubic γ-Al_{2}O_{3} has important technical applications. The so-called β-Al_{2}O_{3} proved to be NaAl_{11}O_{17}.

Molten aluminium oxide near the melting temperature is roughly 2/3 tetrahedral (i.e. 2/3 of the Al are surrounded by 4 oxygen neighbors), and 1/3 5-coordinated, with very little (<5%) octahedral Al-O present. Around 80% of the oxygen atoms are shared among three or more Al-O polyhedra, and the majority of inter-polyhedral connections are corner-sharing, with the remaining 10–20% being edge-sharing. The breakdown of octahedra upon melting is accompanied by a relatively large volume increase (~33%), the density of the liquid close to its melting point is 2.93 g/cm^{3}. The structure of molten alumina is temperature dependent and the fraction of 5- and 6-fold aluminium increases during cooling (and supercooling), at the expense of tetrahedral AlO_{4} units, approaching the local structural arrangements found in amorphous alumina.

== Production ==
Aluminium hydroxide minerals are the main component of bauxite, the principal ore of aluminium. A mixture of the minerals comprise bauxite ore, including gibbsite (Al(OH)_{3}), boehmite (γ-AlO(OH)), and diaspore (α-AlO(OH)), along with impurities of iron oxides and hydroxides, quartz and clay minerals. Bauxites are found in laterites. Bauxite is typically purified using the Bayer process:

Al_{2}O_{3} + H_{2}O + NaOH → NaAl(OH)_{4}
Al(OH)_{3} + NaOH → NaAl(OH)_{4}

Except for SiO_{2}, the other components of bauxite do not dissolve in base. Upon filtering the basic mixture, Fe_{2}O_{3} is removed. When the Bayer liquor is cooled, Al(OH)_{3} precipitates, leaving the silicates in solution.

NaAl(OH)_{4} → NaOH + Al(OH)_{3}

The solid Al(OH)_{3} Gibbsite is then calcined (heated to over 1100 °C) to give aluminium oxide:

2 Al(OH)_{3} → Al_{2}O_{3} + 3 H_{2}O

The product aluminium oxide tends to be multi-phase, i.e., consisting of several phases of aluminium oxide rather than solely corundum. The production process can therefore be optimized to produce a tailored product. The type of phases present affects, for example, the solubility and pore structure of the aluminium oxide product which, in turn, affects the cost of aluminium production and pollution control.

=== Sintering Process ===
The Sintering Process is a high-temperature method primarily used when the Bayer Process is not suitable, especially for ores with high silica content or when a more controlled product morphology is required. Firstly, Bauxite is mixed with additives like limestone and soda ash, then heating the mixture at high temperatures (1200 °C to 1500 °C) to form sodium aluminate and calcium silicate. After sintering, the material is leached with water to dissolve the sodium aluminate, leaving behind impurities. Sodium aluminate is then precipitated from the solution and calcined at around 1000 °C to produce alumina. This method is useful for the production of complex shapes and can be used to create porous or dense materials.

== Applications ==
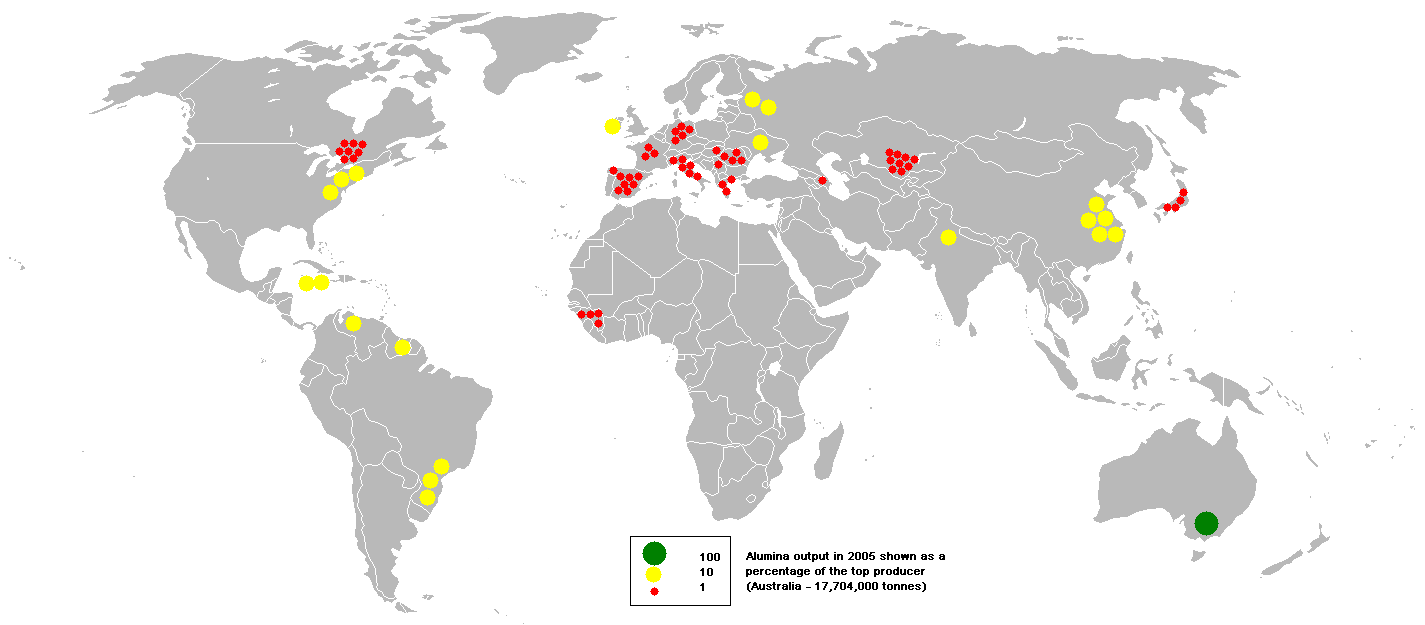
Aluminium oxide output in 2005

Known as alpha alumina in materials science, and as alundum (in fused form) or aloxite in mining and ceramic communities, aluminium oxide finds wide use. Annual global production of aluminium oxide in 2015 was approximately 115 million tonnes, over 90% of which was used in the manufacture of aluminium metal. The major uses of speciality aluminium oxides are in refractories, ceramics, polishing and abrasive applications. Large tonnages of aluminium hydroxide, from which alumina is derived, are used in the manufacture of zeolites, coating titania pigments, and as a fire retardant/smoke suppressant.

=== Smelter grade alumina ===
Over 90% of aluminium oxide, termed smelter grade alumina (SGA), is consumed for the production of aluminium, usually by the Hall–Héroult process.

=== Specialty alumina ===
The remainder, termed specialty alumina, is used in a wide variety of applications which take advantage of its inertness, temperature resistance and electrical resistance.

==== Fillers ====
Being fairly chemically inert and white, aluminium oxide is commonly used as a filler for plastics. Aluminium oxide is a common ingredient in sunscreen and is often also present in cosmetics such as blush, lipstick, and nail polish.

==== Glass ====
Many formulations of glass have aluminium oxide as an ingredient. Aluminosilicate glass is a commonly used type of glass that often contains 5% to 10% alumina.

==== Catalysis ====
Aluminium oxide catalyses a variety of reactions that are useful industrially. In its largest scale application, aluminium oxide is the catalyst in the Claus process for converting hydrogen sulfide waste gases into elemental sulfur in refineries. It is also useful for dehydration of alcohols to alkenes.

Aluminium oxide serves as a catalyst support for many industrial catalysts, such as those used in hydrodesulfurization and some Ziegler–Natta polymerizations.

==== Gas purification ====
Aluminium oxide is widely used to remove water from gas streams.

==== Abrasion ====
Aluminium oxide is used for its hardness and strength. Its naturally occurring form, corundum, is a 9 on the Mohs scale of mineral hardness (just below diamond). It is widely used as an abrasive, including as a much less expensive substitute for industrial diamond. Many types of sandpaper use aluminium oxide crystals. In addition, its low heat retention and low specific heat make it widely used in grinding operations, particularly cutoff tools. As the powdery abrasive mineral aloxite, it is a major component, along with silica, of the cue tip "chalk" used in billiards. Aluminium oxide powder is used in some CD/DVD polishing and scratch-repair kits. Its polishing qualities are also behind its use in toothpaste. It is also used in microdermabrasion, both in the machine process available through dermatologists and estheticians, and as a manual dermal abrasive used according to manufacturer directions.

==== Paint ====
Aluminium oxide flakes are used in paint for reflective decorative effects, such as in the automotive or cosmetic industries.

==== Biomedical applications ====
Aluminium oxide is a representative of bioinert ceramics. Due to its excellent biocompatibility, high strength, and wear resistance, alumina ceramics are used in medical applications to manufacture artificial bones and joints. In this case, aluminium oxide is used to coat the surfaces of medical implants to give biocompatibility and corrosion resistance. It is also used for manufacturing dental implants, joint replacements, and other medical devices.

==== Composite fiber ====
Aluminium oxide has been used in a few experimental and commercial fiber materials for high-performance applications (e.g., Fiber FP, Nextel 610, Nextel 720). Alumina nanofibers in particular have become a research field of interest.

==== Armor ====
Some body armor utilizes alumina ceramic plates, usually in combination with aramid or UHMWPE backing to achieve effectiveness against most rifle threats. Alumina ceramic armor is readily available to most civilians in jurisdictions where it is legal, but it is not considered military grade.

==== Abrasion protection ====
An aluminium oxide layer can be grown as a protective coating on aluminium by anodizing or by plasma electrolytic oxidation (see the "Properties" above). Both the hardness and abrasion-resistant characteristics of the coating originate from the high strength of aluminium oxide, yet the porous coating layer produced with conventional direct current anodizing procedures is within a 60–70 Rockwell hardness C range which is comparable only to hardened carbon steel alloys, but considerably inferior to the hardness of natural and synthetic corundum. Instead, with plasma electrolytic oxidation, the coating is porous only on the surface oxide layer while the lower oxide layers are much more compact than with standard DC anodizing procedures and present a higher crystallinity due to the oxide layers being remelted and densified to obtain α-Al_{2}O_{3} clusters with much higher coating hardness values circa 2000 Vickers hardness.

Alumina is used to manufacture tiles which are attached inside pulverized fuel lines and flue gas ducting on coal fired power stations to protect high wear areas. They are not suitable for areas with high impact forces as these tiles are brittle and susceptible to breakage.

==== Electrical insulation ====
Aluminium oxide is an electrical insulator used as a substrate (silicon on sapphire) for integrated circuits, but also as a tunnel barrier for the fabrication of superconducting devices such as single-electron transistors, superconducting quantum interference devices (SQUIDs) and superconducting qubits.

For its application as an electrical insulator in integrated circuits, where the conformal growth of a thin film is a prerequisite and the preferred growth mode is atomic layer deposition, Al_{2}O_{3} films can be prepared by the chemical exchange between trimethylaluminium (Al(CH_{3})_{3}) and H_{2}O:

2 Al(CH_{3})_{3} + 3 H_{2}O → Al_{2}O_{3} + 6 CH_{4}

H_{2}O in the above reaction can be replaced by ozone (O_{3}) as the active oxidant and the following reaction then takes place:

2 Al(CH_{3})_{3} + O_{3} → Al_{2}O_{3} + 3 C_{2}H_{6}

The Al_{2}O_{3} films prepared using O_{3} show 10–100 times lower leakage current density compared with those prepared by H_{2}O.

Aluminium oxide, being a dielectric with relatively large band gap, is used as an insulating barrier in capacitors.

==== Other ====
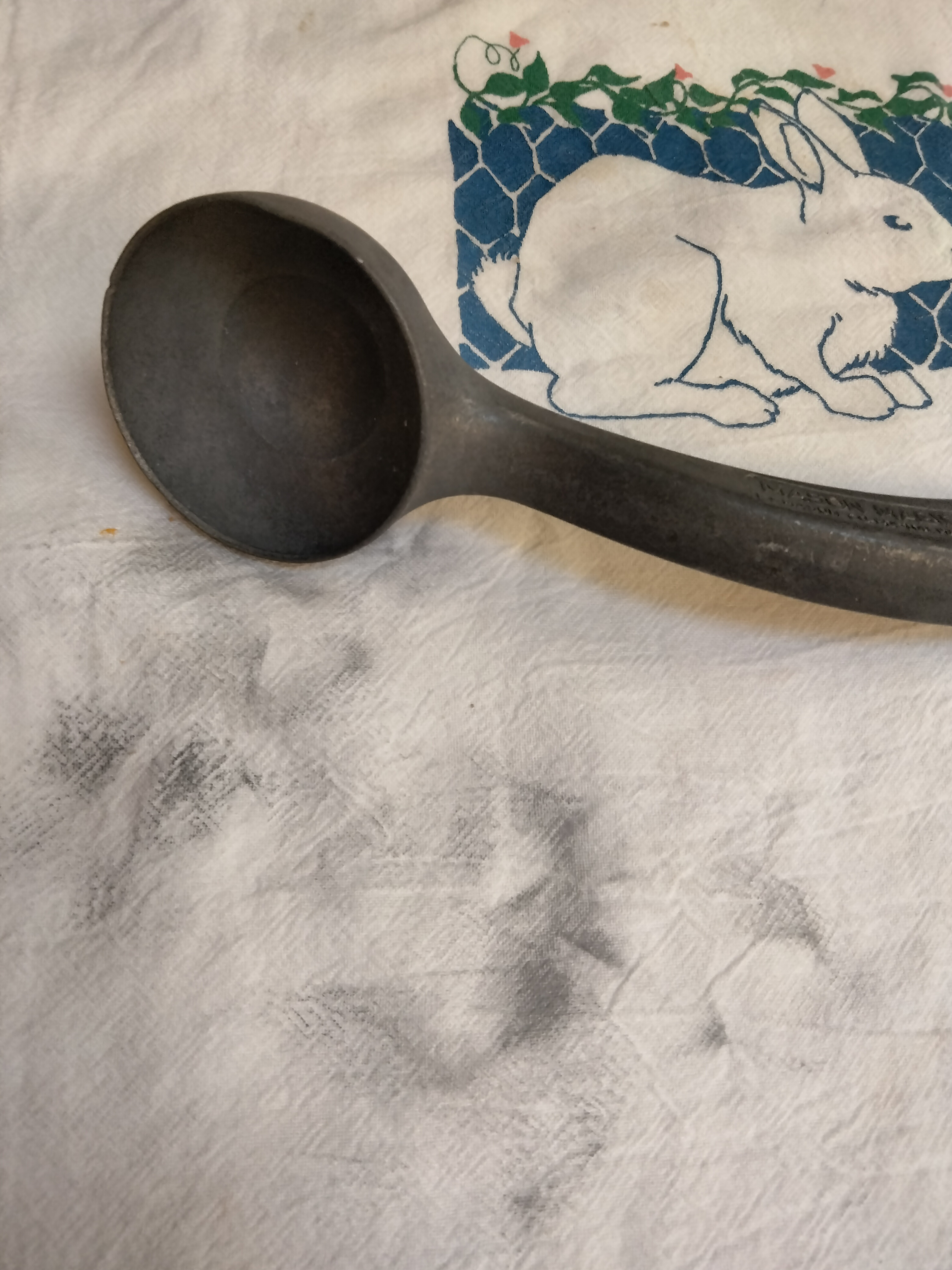
A 1950s vintage ice cream scoop. Aluminium oxide residue can be seen rubbed off on the cloth beneath.

Aluminium ice cream scoops, if improperly washed by using a dishwasher rather than washed by hand, can corrode and leave an aluminium oxide residue, which can present a health concern.

In lighting, translucent aluminium oxide is used in some sodium vapor lamps. Aluminium oxide is also used in preparation of coating suspensions in compact fluorescent lamps.

In chemistry laboratories, aluminium oxide is a medium for chromatography, available in basic (pH 9.5), acidic (pH 4.5 when in water), and neutral formulations. Additionally, small pieces of aluminium oxide are often used as boiling chips.

Health and medical applications include it as a material in hip replacements and birth-control pills.

It is used as a scintillator and dosimeter for radiation protection and therapy applications for its optically stimulated luminescence properties.

Insulation for high-temperature furnaces is often manufactured from aluminium oxide. Sometimes the insulation contains a percentage of silica depending on the temperature rating of the material. The insulation can be made in blanket, board, brick, and loose fiber forms for various application requirements.

It is also used to make spark-plug insulators.

Using a plasma-spray process and mixed with titania, it is coated onto the braking surface of some bicycle rims to provide abrasion and wear resistance.

Most ceramic eyes on fishing rods are circular rings made from aluminium oxide.

In its finest powdered (white) form, called diamantine, aluminium oxide is used as a superior polishing abrasive in watchmaking and clockmaking.

Aluminium oxide is also used in the coating of stanchions in the motocross and mountain-bike industries. This coating is combined with molybdenum disulfide to provide long-term lubrication of the surface.

== See also ==
- Aluminium oxide nanoparticle
- Bauxite tailings
- Beta-alumina solid electrolyte, a fast ion conductor
- Charged Aerosol Release Experiment (CARE)
- List of alumina refineries
- Micro-pulling-down
- Transparent alumina
