= Diamondback Airboats =

Diamondback Airboats is an airboat manufacturer in Cocoa, Florida. The company was established in 1989. Diamondback assembled engines for the world's largest airboat in 1994 for use on the Congo River and shipped more than 24 twin engine airboats to Russia for oil exploration in the Caspian Sea. Their airboats are used by a guide service in the Everglades as well as by a guide service on Lake Erie.

Some of their boats have custom graphics. Noise complaints have been an issue for the company and industry.
