= Ballistic plate =

Protective armoured plate

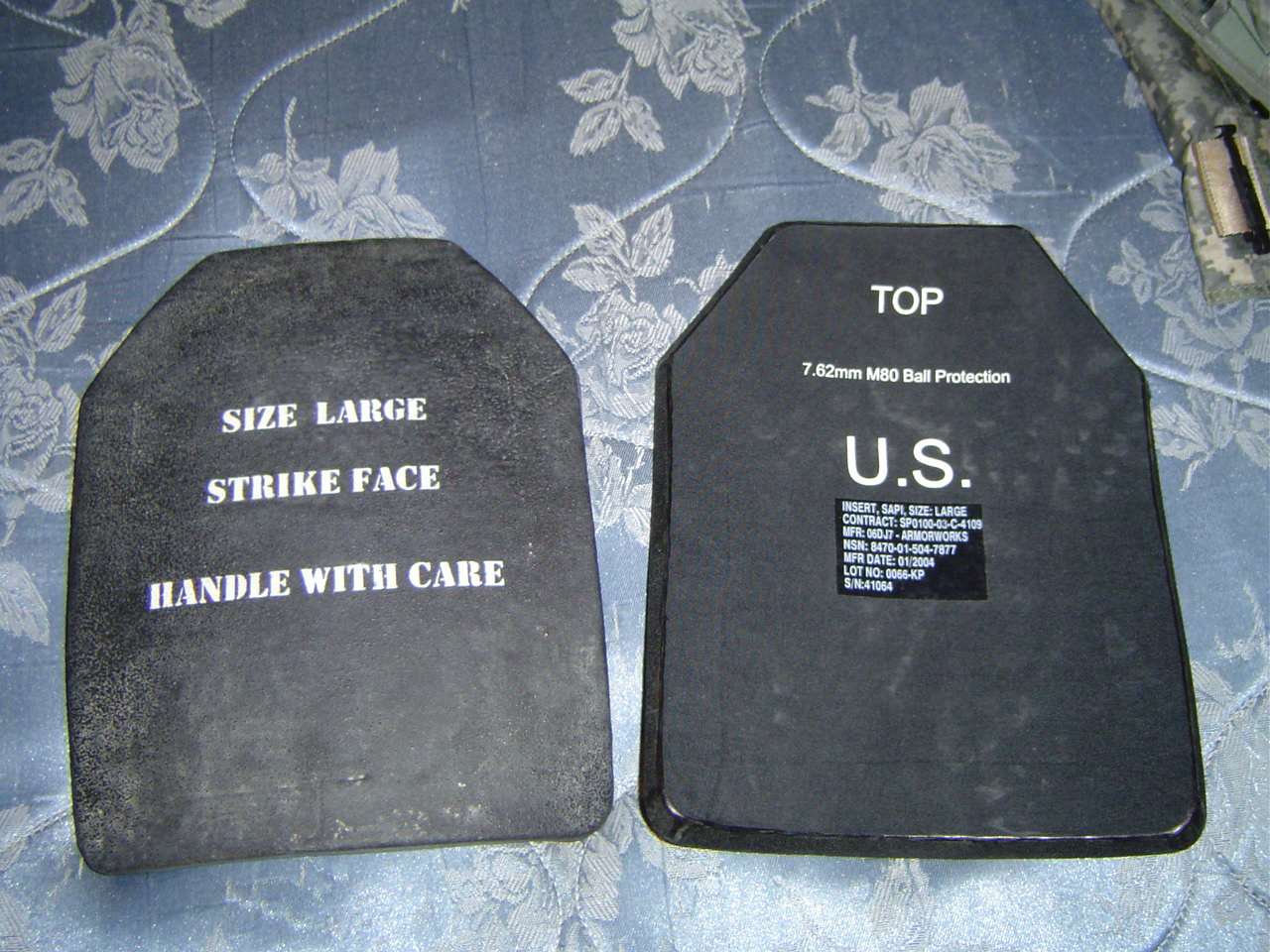
A pair of Small Arms Protective Insert plates, circa April 2006. These were issued to US Army units, before being replaced by the ESAPI.

A ballistic plate, also known as an armour plate, is a protective armoured plate inserted into a carrier or bulletproof vest, that can be used stand-alone, or in conjunction with other armour. "Hard armour" usually denotes armour that uses ballistic plates.

It serves to defeat higher threats, and may be considered as a form of applique armour. It is usually inserted into the front and back, with side inserts also sometimes used. There are also plates for other regions, such as the shoulders, lap, and throat.

== Dimensions and sizing ==
Ballistic plates can be found in a variety of sizes and shapes. In the industry, armour plate shapes are common referred to as a cut, in reference to how the strike face must be cut from the material. The most common are the:

- SAPI Cut, a rectangle with two sloped cuts on the top two corners, the name being derived from the SAPI armour plate. Similar, but with larger cuts, is the Shooter's Cut.
- Swimmer's Cut, similar to a stretched trapezoid on top of a rectangle. Used by SEALs and other seaborne units.
- Rectangle/Square, a rectangular armoured plate with rounded off corners. Somewhat antiquated due to the advent of modern tooling.

Some other cuts exist, but are far less used, such as the ergonomic cut, which covers most of the torso, and the ranger cut, which has largely fallen out of favour for much the same reasons as square.

Most overt armour plates usually are sized to 250 mm × 300 mm (10 in × 12 in), 280 mm × 360 mm (11 in × 14 in), and other such dimensions, however SAPI plates are slightly different. In addition, armour plates may be curved to assist in the user's comfort and ergonomics.

== Materials ==
Most ballistic plates are made of a combination of materials. The following categories denote the primary material used in different plate packages.

=== Ceramic ===
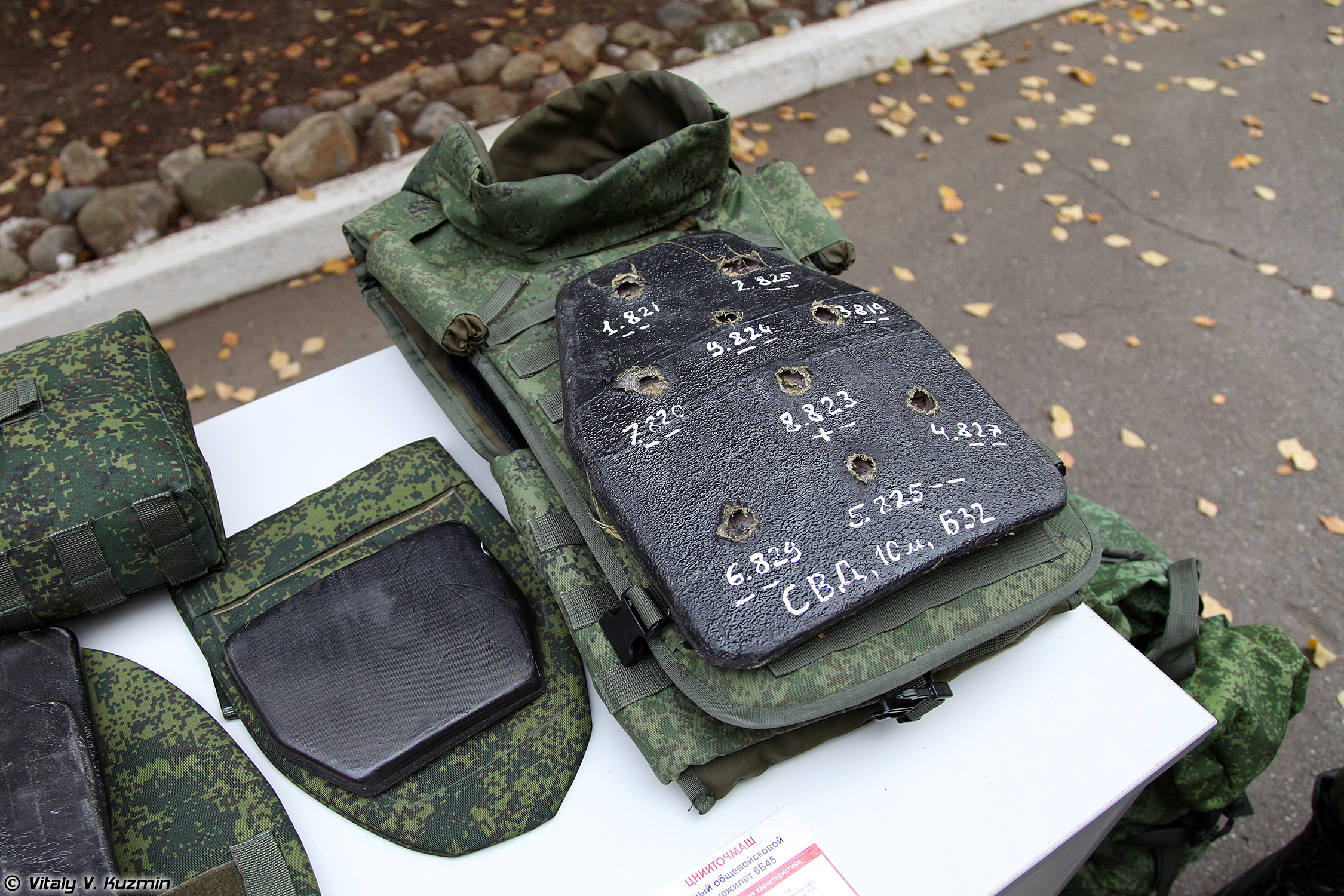
Granit ceramic plate for 6B45 body armor with hits from 7.62x54R SVD rifle

Ceramic armor plates, typically composed of boron carbide, silicon carbide, or other similar materials, are commonplace in military applications. The advantage of ceramic armor is that it is not only lighter than metals, but also much harder, which enables it to deform tungsten core penetrators and resist ammunition at a high velocity. Ceramic material defeats projectiles by shattering it into pieces and deforming it to enlarge its surface area and reducing its velocity, decreasing the penetration ability of the projectile. Compared to metals, ceramics also reduces the possibility of deflecting bullets, where they may end up in a limb, friendly personnel, bystanders or property.

Compared to metal counterparts like steel or titanium, ceramic plates have inferior multi-hit resistance due to its somewhat brittle nature, though most modern ceramic plates mitigate this with extensive tiling and thickness; regardless, they are still somewhat vulnerable to projectiles which hit in a tight grouping, as these create a stress concentration on the plate and shatter the section of plate targeted, although there are workarounds, as with the IM/PACT technologies demonstrated by Ceradyne, which use a stainless steel crack arrestor, or the titanium arrestor of the newest GRANIT GOST 6A armoured plates fielded by Russia's Armed Forces. Ceramic plates can also have their performance reduced or be rendered completely useless if subjected to excessively rough handling, though the exact tolerance for rough handling can vary; British military instructions for the ceramic plates issued with Osprey body armour required users to discard and replace plates that were cracked or otherwise damaged, while stressing that air pockets and minor blemishes did not affect performance.

Some examples of hard ceramic armor are, The “Granit plate” from Russia, The SAPI plate from the US, RMA armament, and much more.

=== Metal ===
Most metal ballistic plates are made primarily of steel or titanium, although aluminum and various alloys also exist. Steel plating, although it suffers less deformation, may suffer greater impulse generated by an impact, as the steel bends very little, and thus little energy is captured. A steel plate shatters a projectile, sending potentially dangerous fragmentation across the plane of the plate. In addition, metal armour has the possibility of deflecting bullets, where they may end up in a limb, friendly personnel, bystanders or property. Munitions impacting above 3100 fps (945 m/s), or having hardened steel penetrators that exceed the hardness of the plate itself, have been known to penetrate commercial armour steel plates sold under NIJ Level III, most notably the 5.56×45mm M193 round. As well, the most common material, AR500 steel, or Abrasion Resistant/ Brinell Hardness 500 steel, is actually not created for armour purposes, and thus can suffer major variances in hardness According to Leeco Steel, "While often requested for ammunition target surfaces, AR500 steel plate is not certified for ballistic use". Hardened steel penetrators and fast velocities have also proven effective in trials and field tests against soviet era, GOST 3 and 4, rated plates.

=== Plastic ===
Multi-layered sheets/plates of ultra-high-molecular-weight polyethylene (UHMWPE) can provide an added ballistic enhancement equal to or even greater than metal plates with less weight. With these, there is the cost of less trauma reduction and the improbable but possible risk of fracture. UHMWPE can be strewn into a thread when made, and woven into a fabric that competes in strength, flexibility, and weight to modern aramid fabrics, and is now a commonly used material in vests, helmets, and rifle plates. UHMWPE however, does have weaknesses, most notably its vastly inferior heat and flame resistance due to being a thermoplastic with a low melting point (130 °C (266 °F)). UHMWPE should not be exposed to temperatures above 100 °C (212 °F) for prolonged periods of time. These composites also tend to bulge up quickly when shot as a result of the delamination. UHMWPE also has issues with resisting harder materials. Steel core ammunition has historically been very problematic for UHMWPE fibers used in body armor, until recent breakthroughs in compression and layering.

=== Nanomaterials ===
As a potential material for future ballistic plates and anti-ballistic fabrics, carbon nanotube and nanocomposite materials offer strength to weight ratios that are potentially superior to other materials. For further information on these materials as applied to ballistics, see the section on ballistic vest nanomaterials in ballistics. There are plates made of nanomaterials currently available in commercial products.
