= Small Arms Protective Insert =

American military ballistic protection system

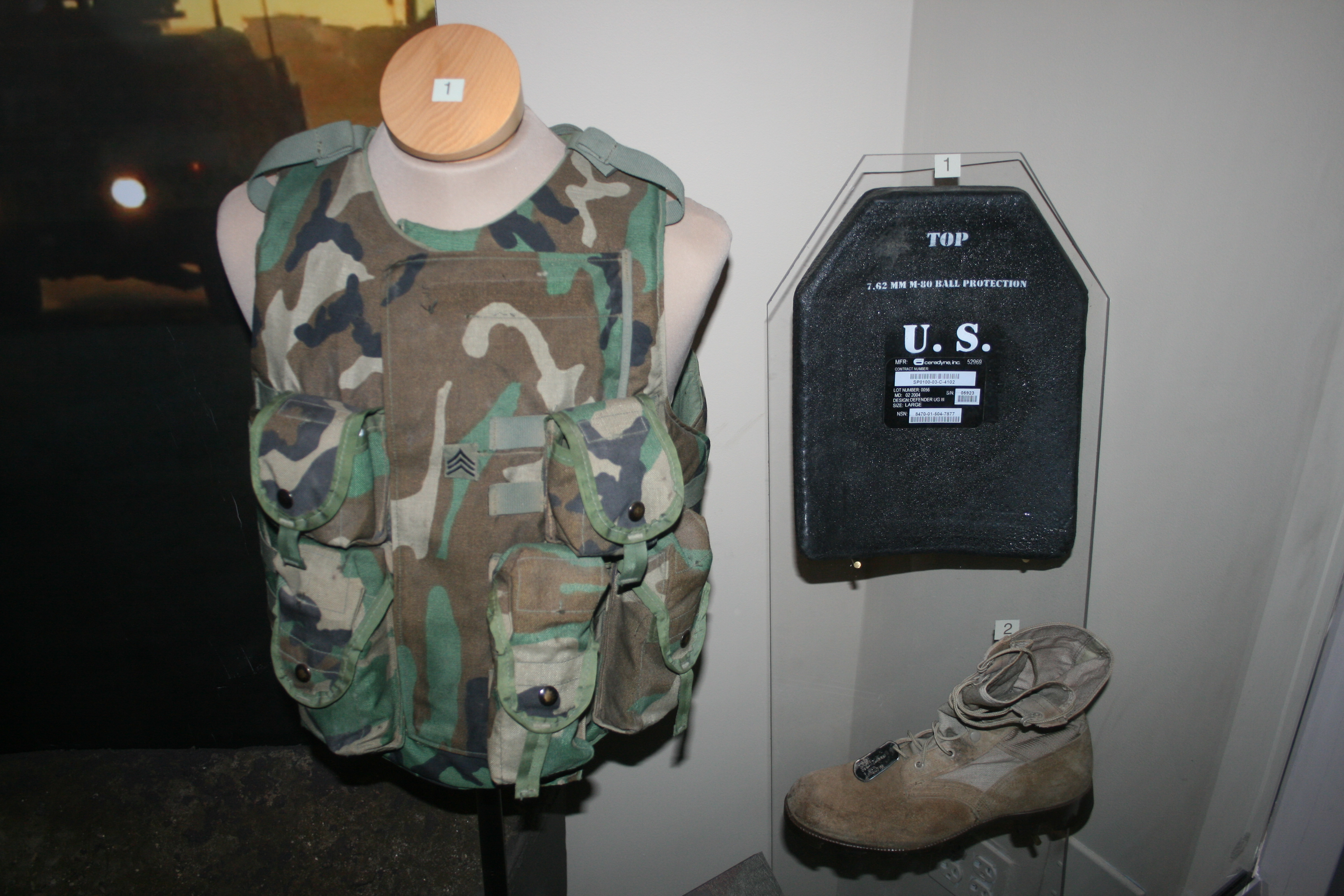
Interceptor Body Armor vest with corresponding SAPI plate.

The Small Arms Protective Insert (SAPI) is a ceramic ballistic plate used by the United States Armed Forces. It was first used in the Ranger Body Armor and Interceptor Body Armor; both are ballistic vests. It is now also used in the Improved Outer Tactical Vest as well as the Modular Tactical Vest, in addition to commercially available "plate carriers". The Kevlar Interceptor vest itself is designed to stop projectiles up to and including 9×19mm Parabellum submachine gun rounds, in addition to fragmentation. To protect against higher-velocity rifle rounds, SAPI plates are needed.

== ESAPI ==
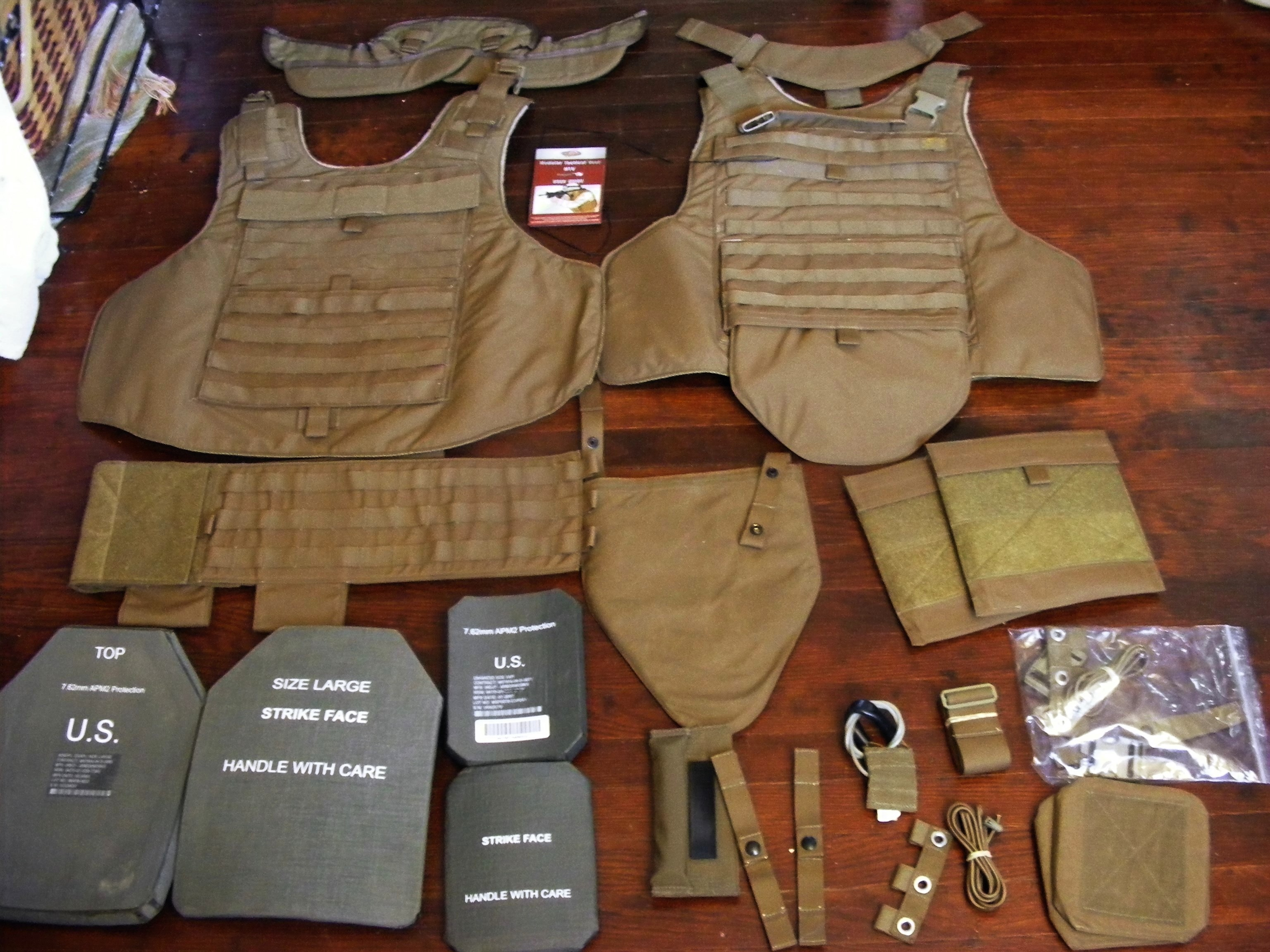
ESAPI and ESBI plates are visible with the components of a Modular Tactical Vest in 2008.

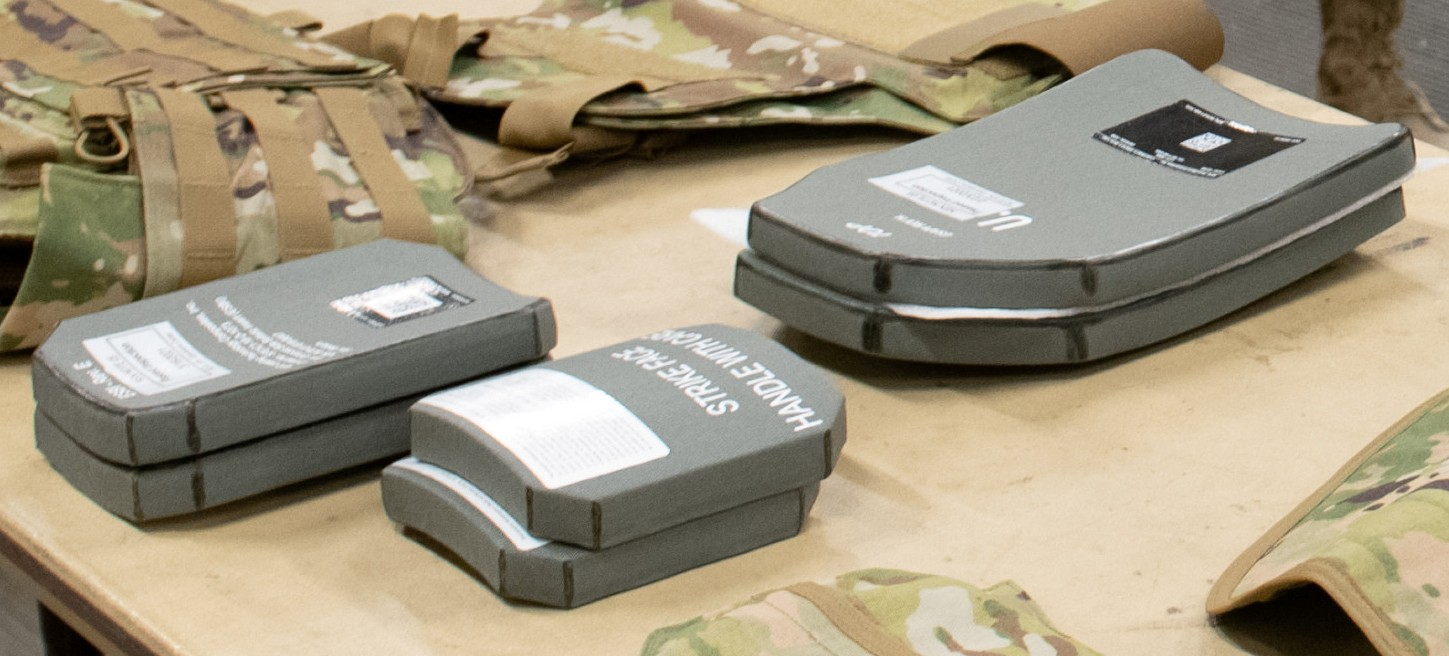
Current-issue ESAPI and ESBI plates in 2021.

In May 2005, the U.S. Armed Forces began replacing the standard Small Arms Protective Insert plates with the Enhanced Small Arms Protective Insert (ESAPI). An ESAPI provides protection from .30-06 Springfield M2 armor-piercing (AP) with a steel penetrator in accordance with the NIJ Level IV standard, but costs about $600 per plate, 50% more than SAPI plates. They are produced by Ceradyne, BAE Systems, and ArmorWorks Enterprises. Newer revisions are also produced by CW Security Solutions, CW Armor, Point Blank Enterprises and Leading Technology Composites.

== XSAPI ==
A call for a next generation plate, to stop even greater velocity threats than the ESAPI plate was issued by the U.S. Army in 2008. The X Threat Small Arms Protective Insert plates are specifically allowed scalar or flexible systems, and asked for better coverage, with less than a pound of additional weight. XSAPI did in fact offer slightly better protection, at the cost of more weight and thicker armor profile.

The XSAPI is intended to protect against an "X-Threat", which is able to be inferred from another source to be the M993 7.62 NATO armor piercing tungsten carbide projectile. In addition, there is record of the FBI utilizing the plate in May 2011.

The plates were developed in response to a perceived threat of AP projectiles in Iraq and Afghanistan. Over 120,000 inserts were procured; however, the AP threats they were meant to stop never materialized, and the plates were put into storage.

== Materials and capabilities ==
The standard plate for the Interceptor body armor is made of boron carbide or silicon carbide ceramic. The standard plates are not given an NIJ rating, as they are tested in accordance with specific protocols for the military and not the NIJ's testing. Military testing calls for survivability of three hits from the round marked on the plate - for standard SAPI, of a caliber up to 7.62 NATO M80 ball and of a muzzle velocity up to 2,750 ft (230 m)/s (840 m/s). For ESAPI, a .30-06 Springfield M2 armor-piercing (AP) (.30-06 black-tip armor-piercing) cartridge. This performance is only assured when backed by the soft armor of the OTV (or any soft armor which meets military requirements for protection). The ceramic plate is backed with a shield made of Spectra, a material up to 40% stronger than Kevlar, to trap any fragments of either plate or projectile and prevent them from injuring the wearer.

== Sizes and weights ==
SAPI plates meant for body armor come in front and back plates which are identical, and smaller side plates. The front and back plates come in five sizes. Their dimensions are the following:

Front and back SAPI plates:

- Extra Small - 1.27 kg (2.8 lb) | 184 mm × 292 mm (7.2 in × 11.5 in)
- Small - 1.59 kg (3.5 lb) | 222 mm × 298 mm (8.7 in × 11.7 in)
- Medium - 1.82 kg (4.0 lb) | 241 mm × 318 mm (9.5 in × 12.5 in)
- Large - 2.09 kg (4.6 lb) | 260 mm × 337 mm (10.2 in × 13.3 in)
- Extra Large 2.40 kg (5.3 lb) | 280 mm × 356 mm (11.0 in × 14.0 in)

ESAPI plates are the same size but greater in weight.

- Extra Small - 1.70 kg (3.7 lb)
- Small - 2.08 kg (4.6 lb)
- Medium - 2.50 kg (5.5 lb)
- Large - 2.85 kg (6.3 lb)
- Extra Large - 3.25 kg (7.2 lb)

Side SAPI (SSAPI, S-SAPI) torso side plates are only in 6 in × 8 in (150 mm × 200 mm) size, and weigh around 1 kg (2.2 lb). The replacement for the S-SAPI in U.S. Army, the Enhanced Side Ballistic Inserts (ESBI, E-SBI), originally had only the 7 in × 8 in (180 mm × 200 mm) size, Small and medium were added later on. The counterpart of the ESBI used by the U.S. Marines is called Enhanced Side Small Arms Protective Inserts (Enhanced S‐SAPI, Side ESAPI). The Enhanced S‐SAPIs have only 6 in × 8 in (150 mm × 200 mm) size as the S-SAPIs. ESBI or Enhanced S-SAPI plates can be replaced with size X-Small ESAPI plates (by unfolding an extension built into the bottom of the ESBI Carrier assembly for the U.S. Army and the S-SAPI Carrier assembly for U.S. Marines for OTVs), if permitted by the unit commander.

ESBI plates:

- Small - 0.75 kg (1.65 lb) | 152 x 152 mm (6 x 6 in)
- Medium - 1 kg (2.19 lb) | 152 x 203 mm (6 x 8 in)
- Large - 1.15 kg (2.53 lb) | 178 x 203 mm (7 x 8 in)

== Physics ==
The mechanism of effect lies in absorbing and dissipating the projectile's kinetic energy in local shattering of the ceramic plate and blunting the bullet material on the hard ceramic. The Spectra backing then spreads the energy of the impact to a larger area and stops the fragments as well as catching the, now deformed, projectile with its larger surface area. The same principle is used for the ceramic tiles used for the armored cockpits of some military airplanes, ceramic composites in ground vehicles, and the anti-spallation liners used in modern armored personnel carriers.

While the projectile may be stopped by the armor, there are cases of those who have been severely injured or killed by back face deformation. Though this is exceptionally rare in the field and in real combat cases, or at least rarely reported, as often in cases of injuries stemming from Behind Armor Blunt Trauma the sources has been found to either be rounds that already exceed or at least very nearly penetrate the Body Armor in question.

== See also ==
- Ceramic plate
- Tactical Vest Antenna System
- Ceramic armor
- Bulletproof vest
- List of body armor performance standards
