= Equipment of an American combat medic =

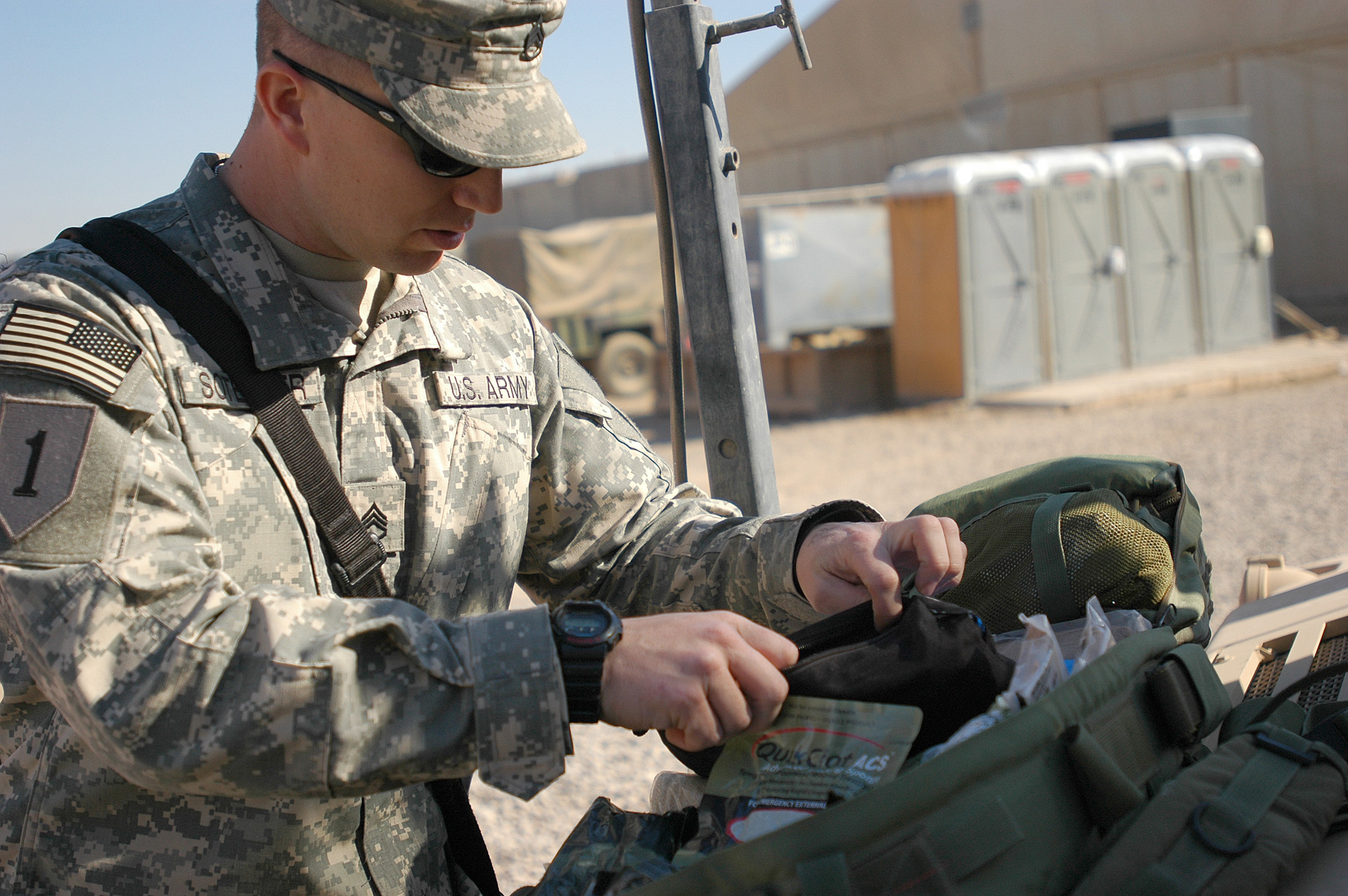
U.S. Army combat medic does daily equipment check (2007)

Combat medics of the United States military carry weapons for personal defense and in most Western armies are equipped virtually indistinguishably from regular infantrymen.

== Arms and insignia ==
While many historical medics were unarmed and marked, most modern medics are unmarked, and armed with small arms. The First Geneva Convention forbids attacks on medical units even under the conditions:

1. That the personnel of the unit or establishment are armed, and that they use the arms in their own defence, or in that of the wounded and sick in their charge.
2. That in the absence of armed orderlies, the unit or establishment is protected by a picket or by sentries or by an escort.
3. That small arms and ammunition taken from the wounded and sick and not yet handed to the proper service, are found in the unit or establishment.
4. That personnel and material of the veterinary service are found in the unit or establishment, without forming an integral part thereof.
5. That the humanitarian activities of medical units and establishments or of their personnel extend to the care of civilian wounded or sick.

The combat medic is commonly referred to as "Doc." The basic equipment of a US Army medic usually consists of:

- An M4A1, and/or a SIG Sauer M17/M18 Modular Handgun System.
- An Improved Outer Tactical Vest or Soldier Plate Carrier System, now being phased out in favor for the newer Modular Scalable Vest;
- The Army Combat Uniform;
- An ACH, or Advanced Combat Helmet, being replaced by the Enhanced Combat Helmet or Integrated Head Protection System.

== Medical equipment ==
A combat medic will typically carry a backpack styled bag known as a "Unit One Pack". Aid bags are available from many different manufacturers, in many different styles. Depending on the unit and their standard operating procedures, the medic may have to follow a strict packing list, or may have the liberty of choosing their kit depending on the mission at hand. A typical aid bag will include:

Fluid Resuscitation

- IV fluids and tubing. The amount and the exact fluid solution will vary on the length and type of the mission. Normal Saline/0.9% Sodium Chloride, Hetastarch/Hextend, and Lactated Ringers Solution (LR) are usually carried.
- 18, 16, and 14 gauge IV catheters.
- IO intraosseous infusion access kit. This may come in the form of a B.I.G device or more commonly the EZ IO Drill. Historically the FAST 1 Kit has been used to gain IO access with this becoming less popular as technology develops.

Hemorrhage (blood loss) Control

- CAT, SOFT-T or improvised tourniquets. Tourniquets are used for the care under fire phase of tactical combat casualty care, to stop massive life-threatening hemorrhage. Noting that improvised tourniquets are seldom effective.
- Emergency Trauma Bandages, a newer version of the first aid pressure dressing.
- Wound Packing Gauze, for stopping hemorrhage, or creating a bulky dressing.
- Hemostatic agents, such as Celox, Hemcon bandages, and others. Some hemostatic agents are controversial due to history of being exothermic and causing burns to the patient. This type has been phased out with newer versions which do not cause burns.

Airway Management

- 14 gauge catheter, at least 3.25 inches long, for needle chest decompression.
- Asherman chest seal, Bolin chest seal or Hyfin chest seal, as an occlusive dressing for sucking chest wounds.
- Nasopharyngeal Airway (NPA) with water-soluble lubricant. This flexible tube secures a nasal airway when the casualty does not have, or may lose their ability to keep their own airway open. Contraindicated by signs of skull fracture. If lubricant is not present for insertion, the patient's spit or blood may be used as a substitute.
- Oropharyngeal Airway (OPA), a hard J-shaped plastic device that secures an oral airway by holding the tongue muscle forward, OPAs can also be used to keep the teeth open for a more permanent airway device.
- I-Gel Laryngeal Airway Device, these secure the patient's airway without the need to inflate the product, resulting in a more rapid insertion.
- King LTD, a simple tube airway with an inflatable cuff to create a sealed airway.
- Combitube, like a King LTD, but designed to be able to function almost no matter how the tube is placed due to the dual lumen tube design. These are being phased out.
- Surgical Cricothyrotomy kit. Many different styles and kits exist, the choice is up to the individual medic's supply, protocols or preference. The most simple is a scalpel to open an airway and to use an NPA to keep the airway patent.

Assorted Equipment

- Alcohol or Providine/Iodine swabs
- Cravats (Triangular bandages)
- Assorted gauze roller bandages
- Band-Aids
- Assorted sizes of tape
- Assorted hypodermic needles and syringes
- Water Gel for burn dressing
- Small sharps container
- Safety pins

Personal Protection

- Gloves for patient examination. Often hypoallergenic nitrile.

Triage Systems

- Tactical Combat Casualty Card
- A black permanent marker (often a Sharpie)

Diagnostic Equipment

- A Combat Medic may also carry other supplies as the mission dictates. A stethoscope, blood pressure cuff, pulse oximeter, otoscope, ophthalmoscope, and thermometer may help the medic treat their soldiers, or civilians on the battlefield (COBs) while on an extended mission, as space dictates.

Casualty Management

- Paramedic Trauma Shears
- Benchmade Model 8 Rescue Hook
- Stretcher with stretcher bearer

Splinting and Immobilization

- SAM Splint—a flexible, reusable splint with a metal core covered in closed cell foam.
- Ace Bandages
- Extrication Collar - Cervical (neck region) spine immobilization
- Coban, a stretchy, self clinging wrap/gauze

Hypothermia Prevention

- Blizzard Survival Blanket OD Green
- Ready-Heat Disposable Heated Blanket
- Us Army Blanket, Combat Casualty
- Us Army Blanket, Combat Casualty Type 2
- NAR Hypothermia Prevention and Management Kit (HPMK)
- Lightweight hypothermia prevention blanket

Battlefield Medicine

• Tranexamic acid, an antifibrinolytic, used to stop the breakdown of blood clots.

- Morphine
- Antibiotics
- Narcan, a narcotics antagonist, to counter morphine's respiratory-depressing effects.
- Phenergan, an anti-nausea treatment, which also increases the pain-reducing effects of morphine.
- Epi-pen, epinephrine in an auto injecting "pen" to counter anaphylactic (severe allergic) reactions.

A combat medic is generally expected to care for the needs of the soldiers in his group, including their everyday ailments. A medic will usually carry a small amount of what are referred to as "snivel" or "sick call meds." These are common over-the-counter medications that do not require a prescription.

- Acetaminophen (Tylenol), anti-pyretic and pain reducer.
- Naproxen and ibuprofen, different NSAIDs which reduce pain and inflammation.
- Diphenhydramine (Benadryl), an antihistamine with a sedative side effect.
- Pseudoephedrine, a nasal decongestant.
- Guaifenesin, an expectorant.
- Loperamide (Imodium AD) an anti-diarrheal agent.
- Pepto Bismol tablets, to settle upset stomachs, treat diarrhea, and heartburn.
- Docusate sodium, a low strength stool softener.
