= PRU-70 =

The PRU-70/P22P-18 (V) is an Armored Survival Vest (ASV) that is intended for aircrews. It was designed by Naval Air Systems Command Human Systems Division. The vests are manufactured by Peckham Vocational Industries in Michigan and are used by Navy and Marine aircrew in Iraq and Afghanistan.

The PRU-70 combines the aircrew survival vest with advanced body armor, designed to fit the varied body types of U.S. aircrew. It reduces bulk, weight, and heat stress faced by helicopter aircrews during combat missions. Made with Halo-Tech fire retardant materials, the PRU-70 is available in Coyote Brown camouflage, suitable for 70 percent of the world's landmasses.

This system replaces the AIRSAVE Survival Vest, the body armor used beneath it, and the PRU-60B, leading to lower costs and simpler logistics. The PRU-70 can be worn alone or configured with life preservers and allows for easy addition or removal of body armor. The PRU-70 is being replaced by the Aircrew Endurance Vest.

== See also ==
- Flak Jacket
- Improved Outer Tactical Vest (IOTV)
- Modular Tactical Vest (MTV)
- Personnel Armor System for Ground Troops (PASGT)
- Interceptor body armor
