= Army Combat Shirt =

United States tactical gear

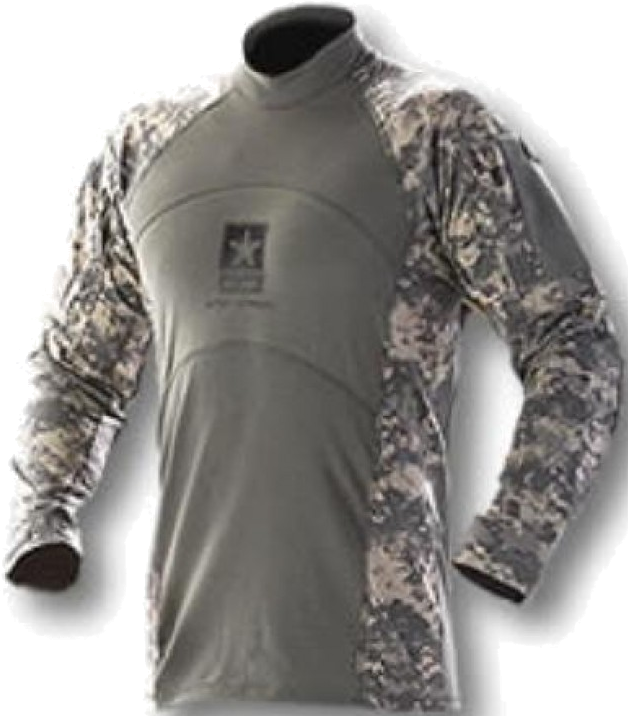
- An early model Army Combat Shirt in the Universal Camouflage Pattern (UCP). This particular model was worn primarily in 2007 and 2008; later models were made without the army logo on the chest.
- Type: Shirt
- Place of origin: United States

Service history
- In service: 2007–present
- Wars: War in Afghanistan; Iraq War

Production history
- Designed: 2002–2006
- Manufacturer: Massif Mountain Gear
- Produced: 2004–present
- Variants: OCP ACS, MultiCam ACS, UCP ACS, Ballistic Combat Shirt

The Army Combat Shirt (ACS) is a flame-resistant shirt developed and used by the United States Army as a supplementary addition to the Army Combat Uniform (ACU). The ACS is a stand-alone shirt designed specifically for use with the Improved Outer Tactical Vest (IOTV) in warm and hot weather instead of the blouse, and was introduced in 2007. It is intended to greatly increase user comfort through the use of lightweight, moisture-wicking, and breathable fabrics. The ACS was created in conjunction with the USMC's Flame Resistant Operational Gear (FROG). The ACS, in conjunction with the Fire Resistant ACU (FRACU) trousers, provides neck-to-ankle protection against burns.

== Background ==
Traditionally, flame-resistant uniforms have been reserved for military personnel such as aviators, fuel handlers and combat vehicle crew who were most likely to encounter fuel-related fires. However, the increasing frequency of improvised explosive devices (IEDs) in Afghanistan and Iraq during the 2000s greatly increased need for flame-resistant clothing and uniforms.

== History ==
Video brief of the Ballistic Combat Shirt

=== 2000s ===
==== 2007: Introduction ====
In January 2007, the Army began shipping 160,000 flame-resistant Nomex uniforms - The Flame Resistant ACU - for soldiers assigned to at-risk convoy operations. However, the Nomex uniforms restricted air movement more than the traditional Cotton/Nylon ACU and were hotter for soldiers to wear. In the mid-2000s, Program Executive Office (PEO) Soldier developed the ACS to provide soldiers with a lightweight, breathable and flame-resistant alternative to the Nomex ACU. Fielding of the ACS began in September of 2007, with two each issued to every soldier being deployed overseas.

=== 2010s ===
==== 2016–2019: Ballistic Combat Shirt ====
Currently the U.S. Army is working on an armored variant of the Army Combat Shirt known as the "Ballistic Combat Shirt", which adds ballistic protection to the upper thorax, lower neck, and upper sleeve areas while sacrificing as little arm mobility as possible. This has been desirable due to the increasing prevalence of low-profile body armor which does not support the additional extremity protection the IBA system does, as well as ergonomic issues with the extremity protection that causes soldiers to choose not to use them even when wearing compatible armor. It will begin fielding in 2019.

== Overview ==
Initially, the torso of the shirt was foliage green with the Army Strong logo centered on the chest (removed in later versions); the arms are in the Universal Camouflage Pattern similar to the Army Combat Uniform, with integrated anti-abrasion elbow pads. No-seam shoulders minimize rubbing or chafing against armor. With the adoption of the MultiCam (OEF-CP) pattern for use in Afghanistan, a version was made with a Tan 498 body and MultiCam sleeves. When the US Army adopted the Operational Camouflage Pattern starting in 2015, a third variant became available which complies to the US Army uniform regulations code AR 670-1 (Wear and Appearance of Army Uniform and Insignia) with a tan/green body (Tan 499) and sleeves in the OCP pattern. Other features include a double pen pocket on the lower arm, zippered storage pockets on the upper arm, concealable infrared identification tabs, and a place to attach name, rank, and flag on the upper arm. There are two styles of the ACS available for soldiers. The Type I has a mock turtle neck and the Type II has a Mandarin style collar with a 3/4 zipper on the chest/neck. The features of all three shirts, besides the collar differences from the two types, are all the same.

The ACS is constructed of three flame-resistant performance fabrics proprietary to TenCate Protective Fabrics or Massif Mountain Gear Company. The shirt’s torso is constructed of two highly breathable flame-resistant fabrics with advanced moisture management capabilities. Both fabrics wick moisture away from the skin and dry rapidly, preventing the fabrics from sticking to the user’s skin in order to reduce heat stress and greatly increase comfort when wearing body armor. The sleeves and side panels of the shirt are constructed of a lightweight, but durable and abrasion-resistant fabric designed to provide extra protection for areas not protected by body armor. All three fabrics feature 4-way stretch for enhanced performance and user comfort.

== See also ==
- Airman Battle Uniform
- Interceptor Body Armor
