= Gold Flex =

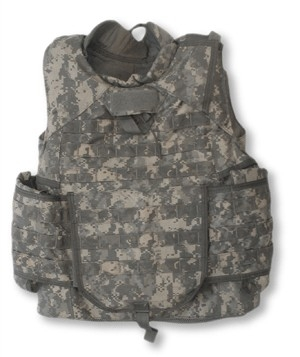
- Manufacturer: Honeywell

Gold Flex is a non-woven fabric manufactured by Honeywell from Kevlar, and is often used in ballistic vests and body armor. Gold Flex is lighter than woven Kevlar, Twaron and other Ballistic material. Gold Flex is a laminated material consisting of cross-laid, non-woven fibers in a resin matrix. The fibers are laid straight and not in a woven fabric configuration. When an object strikes this material, a "web" of its clusters absorb the impact and minimizes penetration.

Honeywell describes "Gold Shield" as being almost identical, only either using two plies instead of four, or using a different resin, depending on version. Both products use Honeywell's patented "Shield" technology, which is present in their Spectra Shield.

== Protection ==
Gold Flex gives resistance to abrasion and resists organic solvents making it non-conductive and non-flammable. Its degradation point starts at 500 °C (932 °F) and it has no melting point. It is sensitive to salts, acids, and ultraviolet radiation. GoldFlex causes static build up. Protection is also based on the pressure of the impact. Some of these fabrics are only designed with hand-guns in mind basically making anything with a bigger caliber a threat potential. One cannot wear a GoldFlex and expect a large caliber round (E.G .50 BMG round) to be stopped from penetrating it. Also GoldFlex is not the only material that is responsible for minimizing penetration and absorbing the attack. Along with GoldFlex there are other layers on top of this fabric to ensure that the object does not penetrate through the material.

=== Armor ===
When a bullet strikes the body armor, it hits ballistic fibers which are strong enough to not penetrate through. This fiber absorbs and disperses the impact that has been made by the bullet to the body armor. This process continues and every layer of this material is effected until the bullet has come to a full stop. All layers combined form a larger area of the impact to disperse and keep the bullet from penetrating the carrier. This helps in reducing the risk of blunt force trauma.

== Production ==
Element Table
Characteristics
Roll Weight	Pounds	122.7
Width	Inches	63.0
Length	Feet	492
Total Area Density	Testing Method	ASTM D3776-96 (2002)

== Comparison with other materials ==
Kevlar Chemical Composition
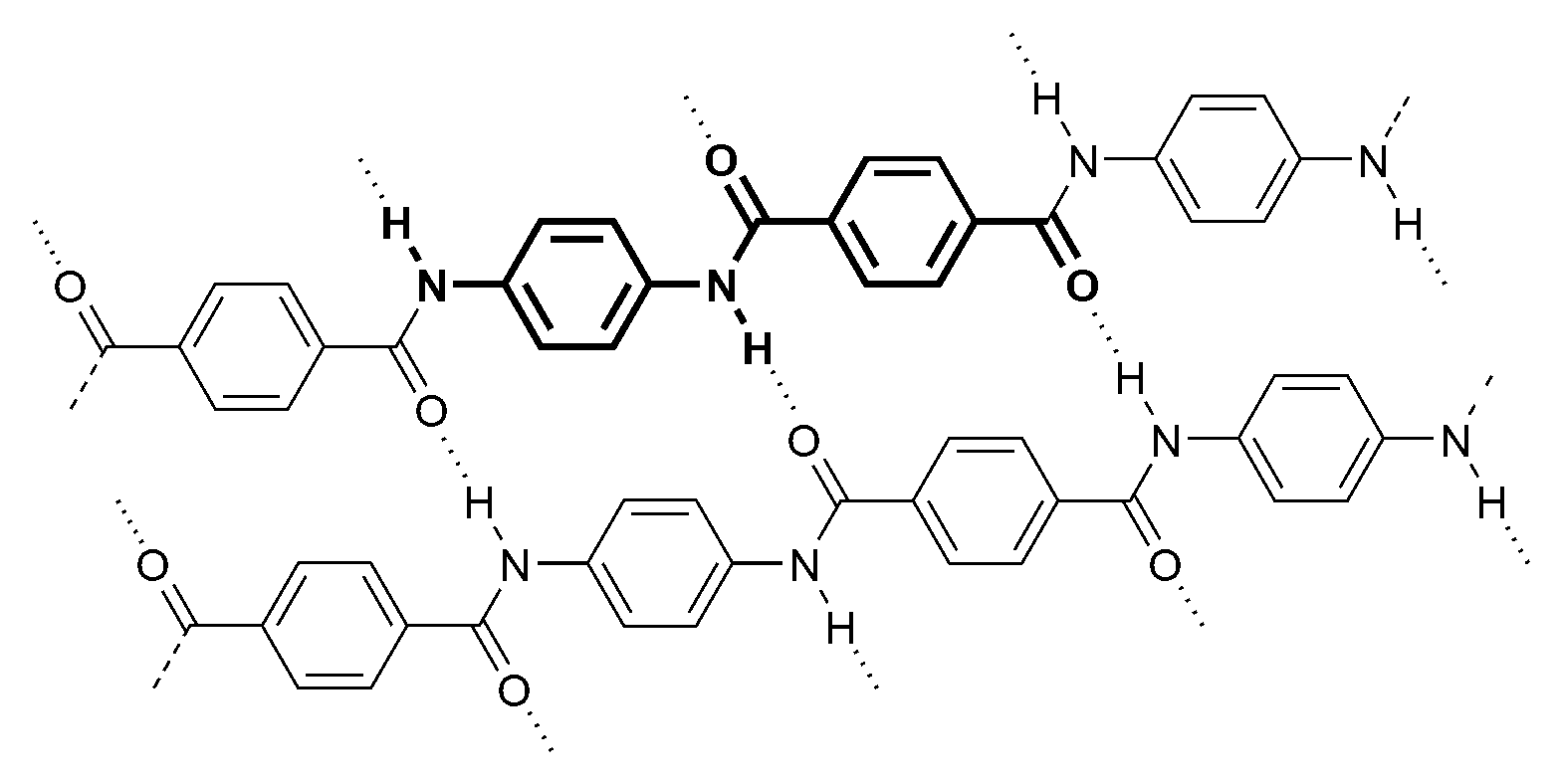
- A Chemical Structure of the fabric used in a Kevlar

Kevlar is five times stronger than steel of equivalent weight. It was invented by a Polish-American chemist Stephanie Kwolek and introduced in the 1970s. It is used for body armor and racing tires but is more expensive than Gold Flex. Twaron is another alternative to Gold Flex but is not much in demand. Occasionally several materials are used in one product.

== See also ==
- Ultra-high-molecular-weight polyethylene
- Improved Outer Tactical Vest
