= Modular Scalable Vest =

US Military Body Armor

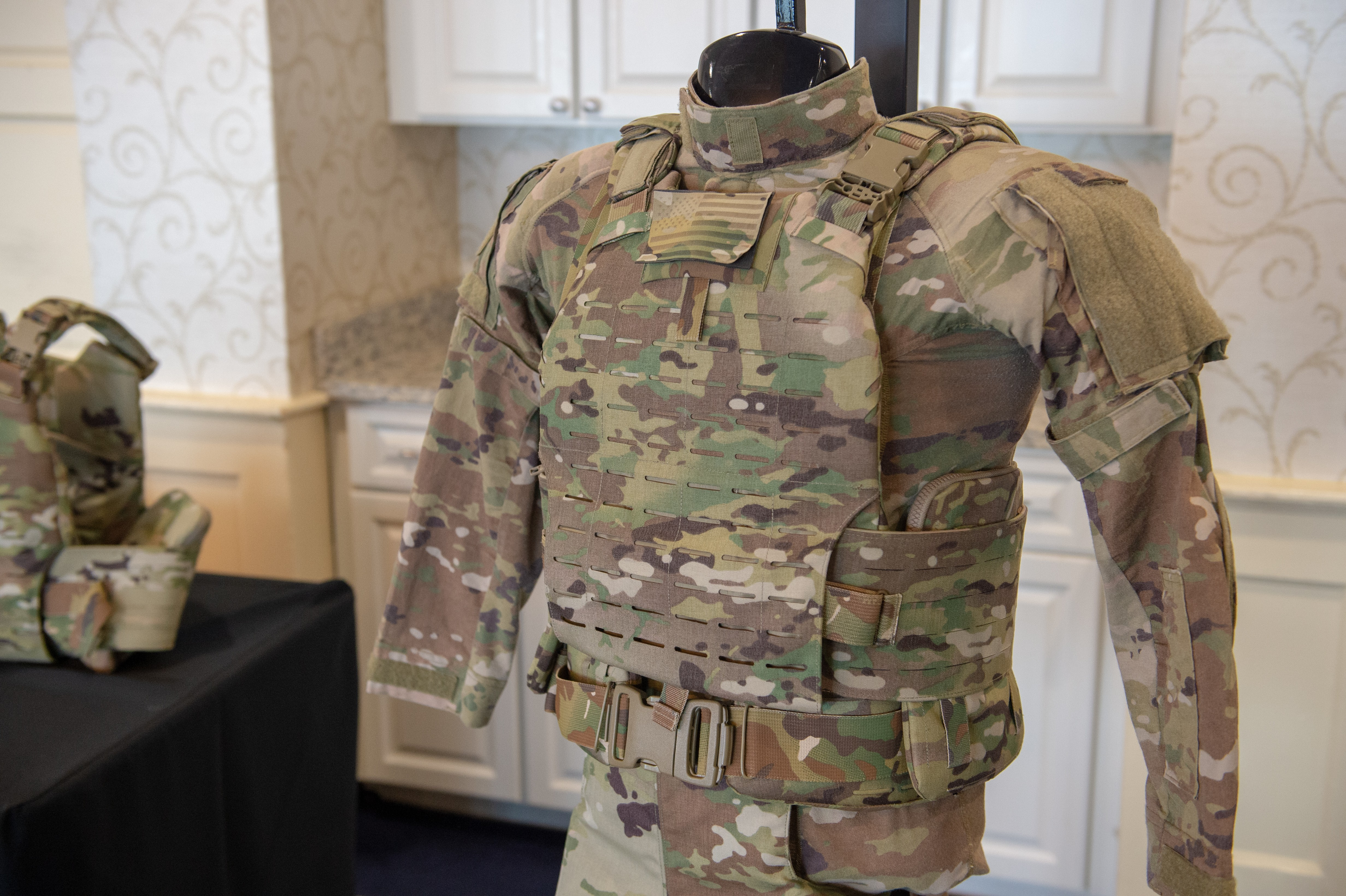
- A Modular Scalable Vest on display at Fort Belvoir in 2019
- Type: Body armor
- Place of origin: United States of America

Service history
- In service: 2018–present
- Used by: U.S. Army, U.S. Air Force

The Modular Scalable Vest (MSV) is a bullet-resistant vest that has been introduced by the United States Armed Forces in 2018.

The Modular Scalable Vest is replacing all other body armor systems in use, including the OTV (outer tactical vest), IOTV (improved outer tactical vest) and SPCS (soldier plate carrier system). The MSV is 5 lb (2.3 kg) lighter when fully loaded with ballistic plates compared with its predecessor, the IOTV. The MSV fully loaded weighs 25 lb (11 kg).

== History ==
The U.S. Air Force has begun to issue the MSV to replace the IOTV, with the goal of issuing it exclusively by the end of fiscal year 2022.

== Design ==
The MSV has a four-tier configuration, allowing it to be scaled up or down depending on the threat and mission requirements

1. Concealable soft body armor
2. Hard armor plates and soft body armor
3. Carrier with ballistic plates and soft armor
4. Carrier with ballistic plates and soft armor as well as a "ballistic combat shirt" with "built in neck, shoulder and pelvic protection and a belt system to move items from the vest to the hips."

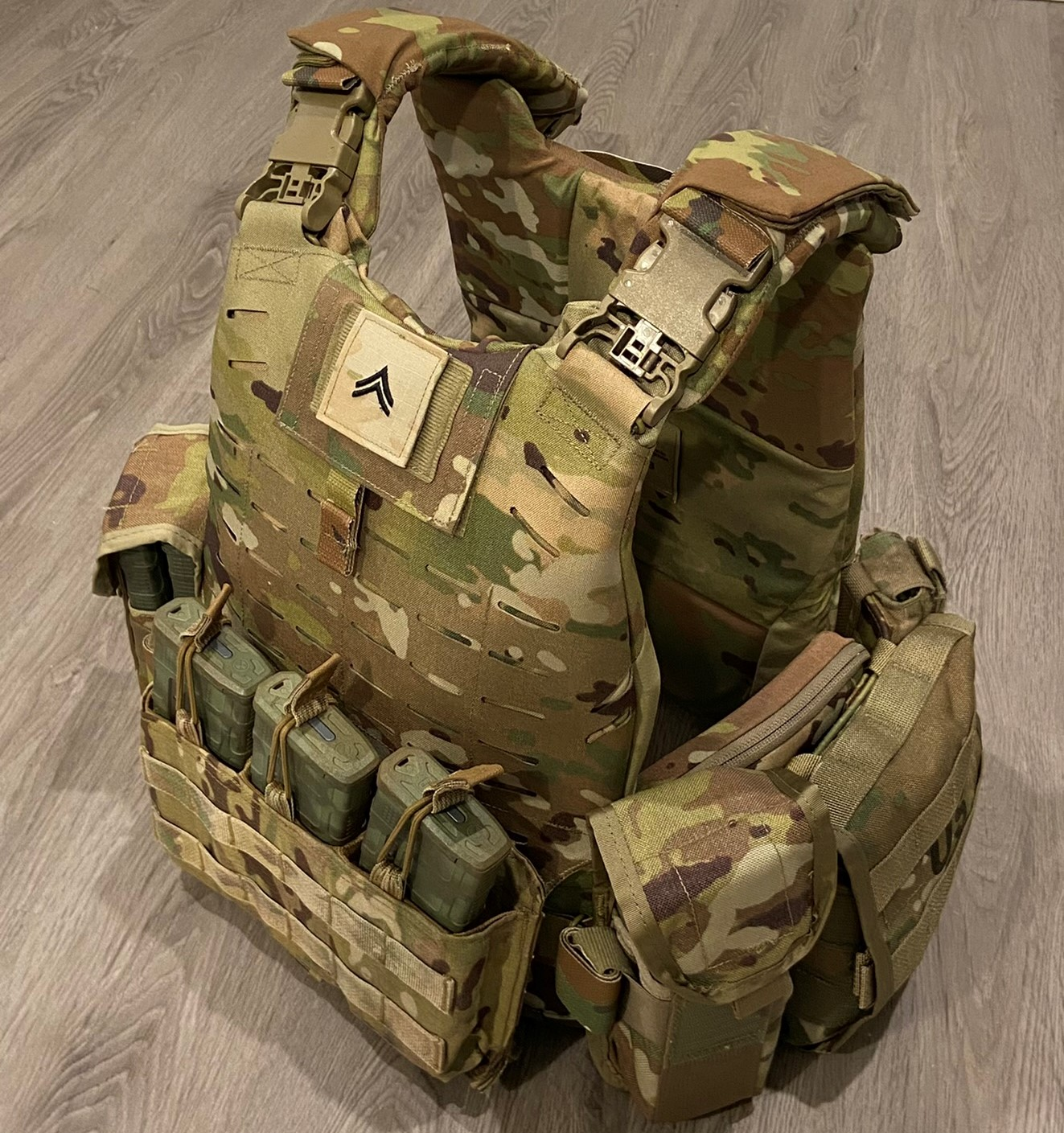
A typical soldier's loadout on the MSV Gen II.

Only a few ballistic material suppliers have been able to comply with the armor panel weight specifications demanded by the US Military: Teijin Aramid, DSM Dyneema and Honeywell Spectra.
