= Improved Outer Tactical Vest =

US Army body armor

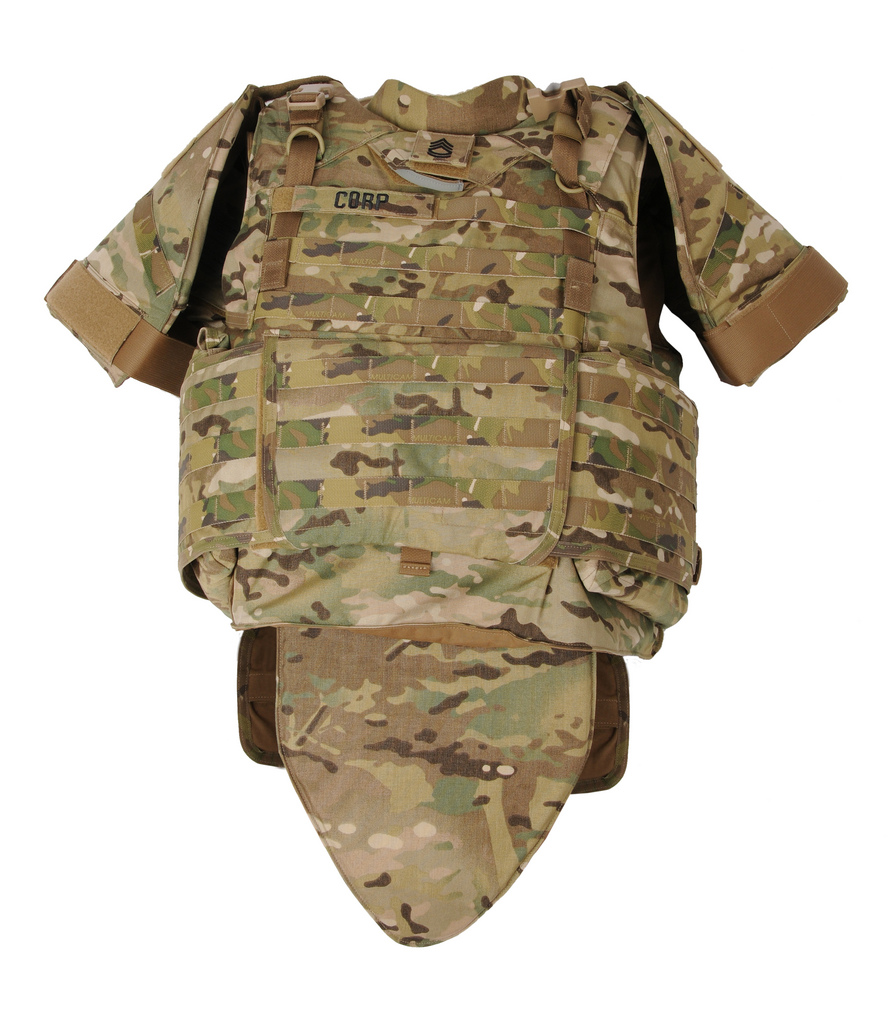
- An IOTV outfitted in a MultiCam camo scheme that has MOLLE with neck, shoulder, groin and lower back protectors attached
- Type: Bulletproof vest
- Place of origin: United States

Service history
- In service: 2007–present
- Used by: See Users
- Wars: War in Afghanistan (2001-2021); Iraq War; Russo-Ukrainian War

Production history
- Designed: 2007
- Manufacturer: Point Blank Body Armor, BAE Systems, KDH Defense Systems, Protective Products Enterprises, UNICOR and Creative Apparel Associates
- Produced: 2007–present
- Variants: Universal Camouflage Pattern; Operational Camouflage Pattern (2016–present)

The Improved Outer Tactical Vest (IOTV) is an enhanced version of, and a replacement for, the older Outer Tactical Vest (OTV) component of the Interceptor multi-threat body armor system, as fielded by the United States Army beginning in the mid-2000s. The IOTV is compatible with the Deltoid and Axillary Protector System (DAPS) components, ESAPI (Enhanced Small Arms Protective Insert), Enhanced Side Ballistic Inserts (ESBI), as well as the OTV's groin protector. A flame-resistant standalone shirt, the Army Combat Shirt (ACS), was designed in the late 2000s specifically for use with the IOTV.

The OTV design was considered insufficient and lacking in certain areas, which led to the IOTV's development and fielding beginning in 2007. The IOTV is currently produced by Point Blank Body Armor, BAE Systems, KDH Defense Systems, Protective Products Enterprises, UNICOR and Creative Apparel Associates. The IOTV first saw action in combat with U.S. Army ground combat units in from mid-2007 onward and currently remains the standard body armor type used by regular U.S. Army ground combat units overseas, although the new Modular Scalable Vest is set to replace it in the coming years.

== Background ==
While the Interceptor Body Armor and the Outer Tactical Vest were considered fairly effective, questions were raised over whether or not they were the best possible armor solution for soldiers of the United States Military. This debate was heightened by controversy over Dragon Skin, produced by the now defunct Pinnacle Armor. Various claims surfaced that Dragon Skin was more effective at protecting soldiers than the then standard issue Interceptor Body Armor system, with independent studies and reports seeming to back these claims, eventually leading to multiple congressional members asking for further evaluation. In response, the military made public testing that showed widespread failures in the testing of the Dragon Skin armor. Ultimately, Dragon Skin never saw widespread adoption, and many of the perceived shortfalls of the Outer Tactical Vest such as standard of protection or modularity were addressed in the new Improved Outer Tactical Vest and E-SAPI plates.

== Technical details ==
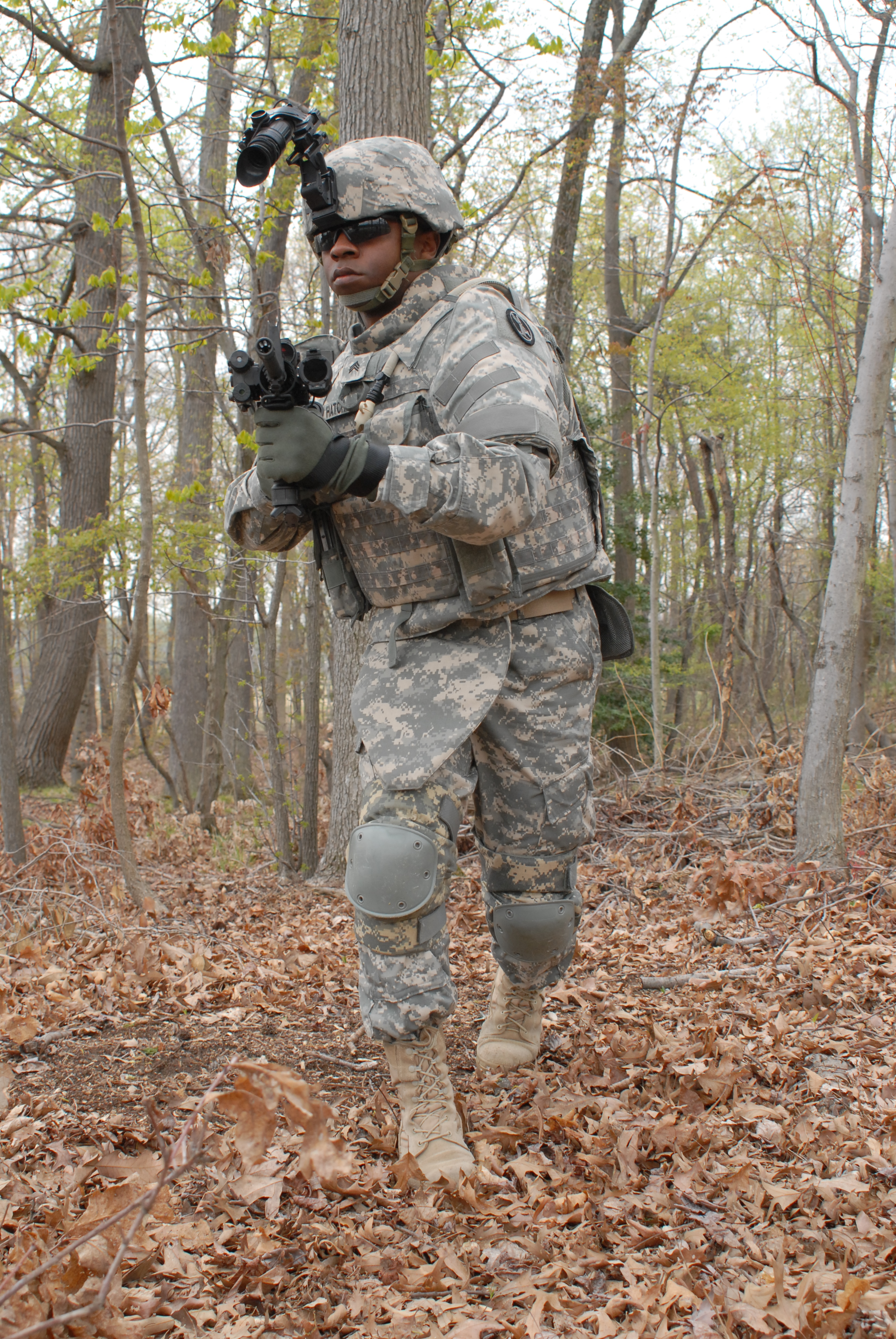
US Army soldier showcasing the IOTV in Universal Camouflage Pattern for PEO Soldier in April 2007.

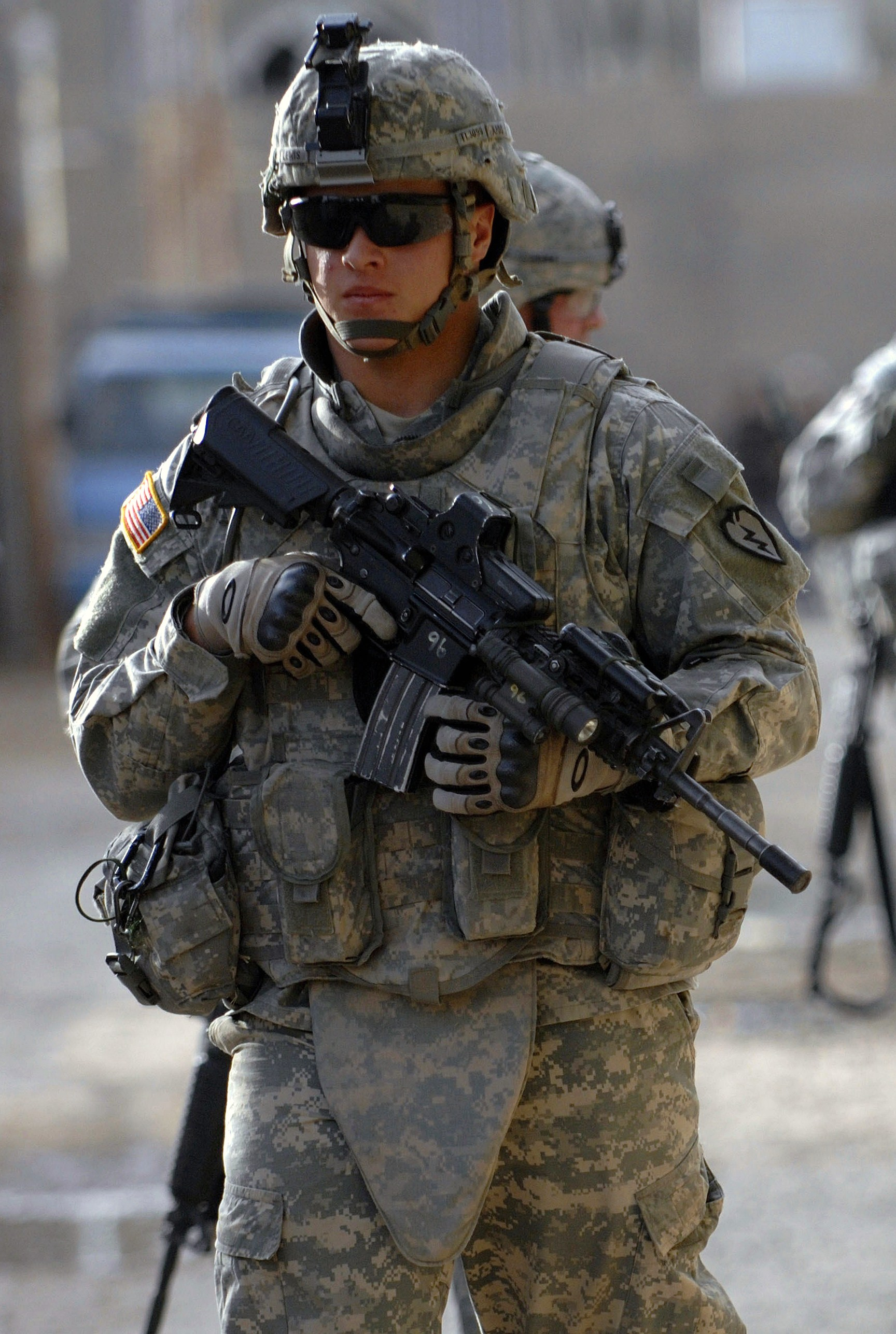
Private Derek Hayes, 25th Infantry Division, wears an Improved Outer Tactical Vest (IOTV) with a groin protector in Iraq in February 2008.

A size Medium IOTV weighs 3.6 pounds (1.6 kg), less than a Medium OTV vest, while providing more coverage. However, a fully equipped IOTV, complete with all its components (soft armor panel inserts, four ballistic plate inserts (front and back plates and two side plates), collar, and groin protectors) still weighs 30 pounds (14 kg), with a Large IOTV weighing about 35 pounds (16 kg). The functionality of the enhanced side ballistic inserts, which provide coverage under the arms and down the sides of the torso, is built into the IOTV.

The IOTV provides the ability to don the vest in two ways. The first is to simply place the vest over the head and pull down, and the second is to remove fasteners on the wearer's left shoulder, sliding into the vest to the right. To complete the procedure for both methods the wearer then lifts up the front panel of the vest and fastens the waistband, which takes the weight of the vest off the shoulders somewhat, and then fastens the side protection modules.

A key design feature for the IOTV is that the entire armor system is able to be released with the pull of a hidden lanyard. The armor then falls apart into its component pieces, providing a means for escape in case the wearer falls into water or becomes trapped in a hazardous environment. The hidden release lanyard also allows medical personnel easier access to a casualty, which was one concern that was not addressed with the old Interceptor armor. It also features a grid of Pouch Attachment Ladder System (PALS) webbing on the front, back, and sides for the attachment of modular pouches and accessories such as neck and throat protection, groin protection, or deltoid protection. Equipment attachment rings for the Tactical Assault Panel (TAP), which has replaced the older Fighting Load Carrier vest (FLC), have been in all IOTV models since the Gen II, which was introduced in the early 2010s.

=== Female model ===
In response to the large numbers of female soldiers in the army, a female-specific version of the IOTV (F-IOTV) was developed. Previously, standard tactical vests were issued to women in combat. Army soldiers found that women's movement was restricted, in ways such as bending over, getting in and out of tight spaces, or positioning their rifles against their shoulders. The long armor plates inside the vests would also rub against their hips and cut into their thighs when they sat down. Development of a model for women began in 2009. After much testing and measurements, the Army came up with a vest that is shorter to accommodate smaller torsos and has tailoring to fit closer to women's chests. The new vest eliminates gaps between the material and the body and can be fitted with smaller side ballistic inserts for small waist sizes. The vest has a lighter feel because it does not rest on the female soldier's shoulders like the male vest. The first female soldier vests were given to soldiers deploying for Afghanistan in September 2012.

== Features ==
Nearly all modern military body armor is designed to prevent penetration from bullets to vital areas of the body, in addition to protection against knives and fragmentation from explosives. Typically this is accomplished through both highly durable woven synthetic fibers such as Kevlar or Dyneema, and either metal or ceramic ballistic plates. The IOTV is the standard issue torso protection component to the United States Army.

The IOTV is designed to take the weight of the vest off the shoulders and move it to the lower torso, and made to permit maximum freedom of movement. The vest is also equipped with a mesh inner cover that is designed to improve airflow inside of the armor. There is also a back pad in the lower back area of the vest, which is designed to defeat fragmentation impacts to the lower back/kidney areas. However, the back pad does not provide significant ballistic protection. The vest can withstand a direct impact from a 7.62 millimeter (both NATO and ex-Soviet types) on the front or rear if using the older SAPI plates (NIJ standard III). Use of the new E-SAPI plates increase protection to armor-piercing versions of the aforementioned rounds in addition to .30-06 Springfield M2 armor-piercing rounds (NIJ standard IV). The IOTV provides, without the ballistic ceramic plates inserted, protection from small caliber rounds (i.e. 9mm) and fragmentation. The soft kevlar panels have been tested to stop 9 mm 124 grain full metal jacket bullets at 1,400 ft/s (426 m/s) with minimal deformation and has a V-50 of roughly 1,525 ft/s (465 m/s). This means that the bullet has to be traveling faster than 1,525 ft/s (465 m/s) for it to have more than a 50% chance of breaking through the soft armor panel. These specifications are similar to the NIJ standard level III-A certification; however, military standards do not require their vests to be NIJ certified as this is primarily a law enforcement standard.

The modular design of the vest allows greater tactical flexibility in regards to different situations faced by ground troops. A US Army medical research report concluded that greater modular design leads to the ability to find a more effective balance between projectile protection and the physical endurance of the soldier, preventing losses in agility and mobility, and therefore reducing potential injuries or casualties. Initially, the vest came in the Universal Camouflage Pattern (UCP), and IOTVs with it were standard issue until the UCP pattern began to be replaced beginning in 2016, with the Operational Camouflage Pattern (OCP).

=== E-SAPI plates ===
E-SAPI (Enhanced Small Arms Protective Insert) plates and their smaller counterparts E-SBI (Enhanced Side Ballistic Inserts) plates, are ceramic ballistic plates that provide the bulk of the protection against projectiles when carried in an Improved Outer Tactical Vest, and are also used as part of many other body armors such as the Modular Tactical Vest. E-SAPI plates are designed to cover the vital front and back torso areas of the torso, while E-SBI plates are designed to protect the sides of the torso. The plate component itself is made of boron carbide, a widely used and extremely hard boron-carbon ceramic. Backing the plate is a layer of Spectra, a woven polymer material with extremely high tensile strength meant to stop any projectile that manages to pass through the ceramic strikeface.

When a bullet strikes the E-SAPI plate, the kinetic energy is dispersed throughout the ceramic layer, and the majority of military rounds in common use are stopped or broken up. If the bullet continues through the boron carbide layer, the Spectra backing either stops the bullet, or, if the bullet was powerful enough, allows the bullet to pass through into the IOTV itself, and likely the wearer. Even in the event of the E-SAPI plate failing to prevent penetration, the velocity and energy of the penetrating round is often reduced to the point where the resulting wound is non-lethal. E-SAPI plates are manufactured by Armorworks Enterprises, Ceradyne, Simula, and BAE Systems.

Durability standards are high for E-SAPI plates, with Army requirements on environmental condition testing involving the plates being kept 6 hours at both a high temperature and a low temperature in addition to being dropped twice among a variety of other requirements. USSOCOM requirements are even more stringent, involving 24 hours at high and low temperatures. While E-SAPI plates do hold significant defensive advantages over the preceding SAPI plates, the increased protection comes at the cost of increased weight and significantly increased cost. Comparing medium-sized plates, a SAPI plate weighs 1.82 kg (4.0 lb) while an E-SAPI plate weighs 2.5 kg (5.5 lb), over a 35 percent increase in weight. In regards to cost, E-SAPI plates cost 50 percent more, coming in at approximately $600 per plate. SAPI plates were largely phased out in favor of E-SAPI plates beginning in 2005.

=== XSAPI plates ===
XSAPI (X Threat Small Arms Protective Insert) plates are ceramic ballistic plates that have begun replacement of the ESAPI. They are mostly issued to personnel in higher threat environments like Iraq or Afghanistan. The plates are tan colored and the first batch was shipped in the second quarter of 2009, Ceradyne receiving a $77 million contract for delivery. Its threat level is presumably against the M993 7.62 NATO penetrator, as denoted by the back's marking. In the text "7.62mm AP/WC Protection" displayed on the back of the plate, "WC" is the chemical formula for tungsten carbide, the penetrator material of the M993 projectile.

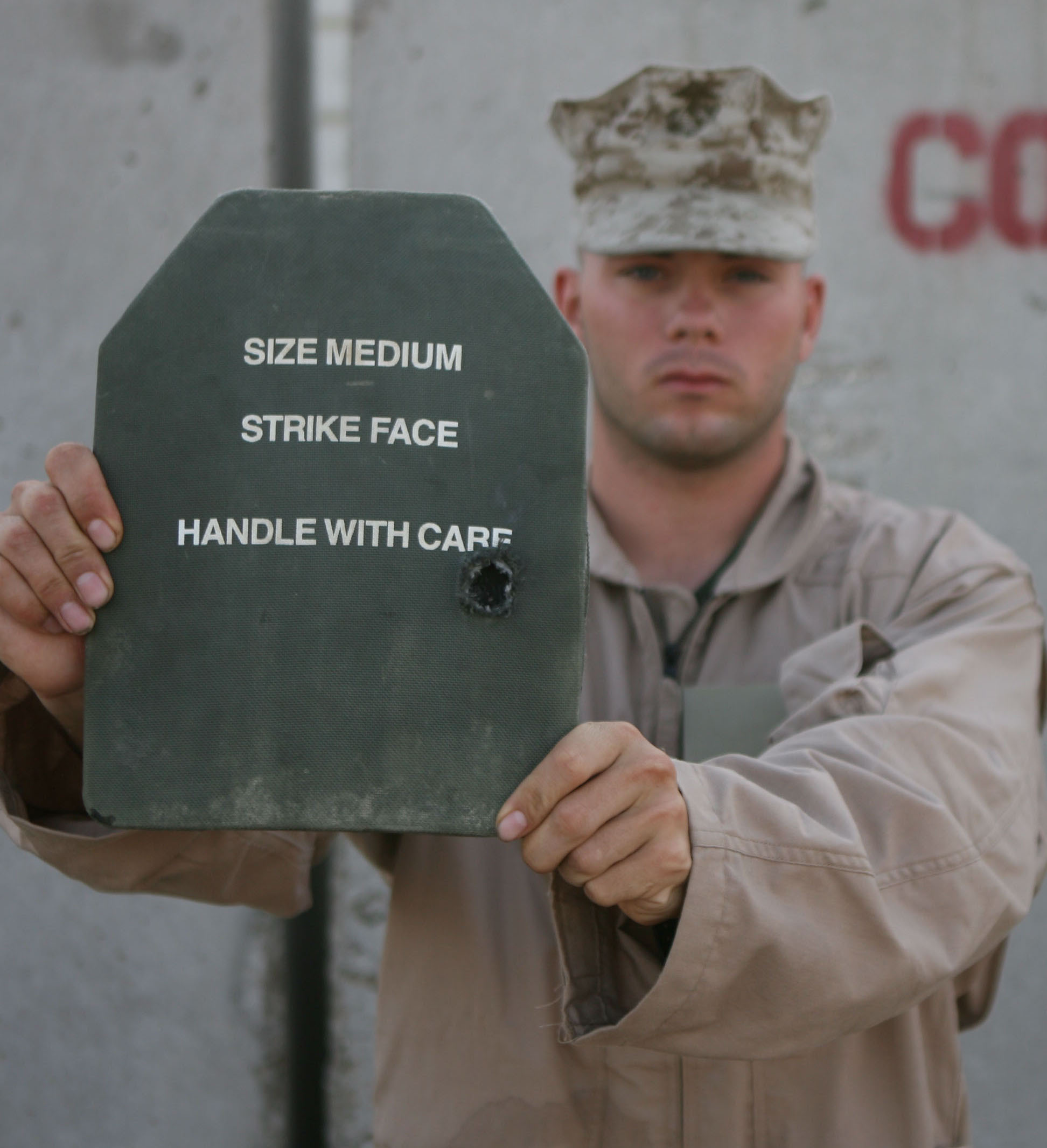
A USMC corporal showing the E-SAPI plate which successfully stopped a bullet in combat when he was hit.

== Effectiveness ==
The Improved Outer Tactical Vest as a whole is an improvement over previous US body armor systems, with the fragmentation vest from the Vietnam War being limited to fragmentation protection, the PASGT vest being limited to pistol rounds, and the previous Outer Tactical Vest being unable to stop armor piercing rounds.

In response to the feedback of soldiers on the effectiveness of the armor system, the Army has continually upgraded the IOTV with new features, with Generation III involving a more intuitive quick release system. Rather than producing entirely new IOTV armor sets, body armor conversion kits have been delivered at a lower cost in order to bring older Generation armor sets up to newer standards.

=== Alternatives ===
One criticism carried over from the older OTV to the newer IOTV is what is regarded as the excessive weight of the armor, especially by dismounted infantrymen who regard the armor almost as a liability. In response to this, the U.S. Army is looking into supplementing the heavy IOTV with the newer Modular Body Armor Vest (MBAV) and Soldier Plate Carrier System (SPCS) already in service in Ranger and Airborne units. The MBAV and SPCS do provide less soft body armor coverage, but are lighter than the IOTV, and were thus more suitable for patrol in Afghanistan. The Army plans to introduce the torso and extremity protection (TEP) system beginning in 2018, which includes a modular scalable vest, ballistic combat shirt, blast pelvic protection system, and battle belt to reduce overall weight from 26 to 21 lb (11.8 to 9.5 kg) while maintaining coverage by reducing excess bulk. The Modular Scalable Vest, first issued in 2018, is set to replace the IOTV as the standard protective vest issued to US soldiers.

== Users ==
- United States: U.S. Army
- Ukraine: Nearly a thousand vests purchased by Ukraine from private owners between 2014 and 2016, and utilized by Ukrainian soldiers involved in combating the Russian invasion of Ukraine.

== See also ==
- Dragon Skin
- Gold Flex
- Modular Tactical Vest
- Osprey body armor
- PRU-70
- Soldier Plate Carrier System
- 6B45 ballistic vest
