= Interceptor multi-threat body armor system =

Bullet-resistant body armor system

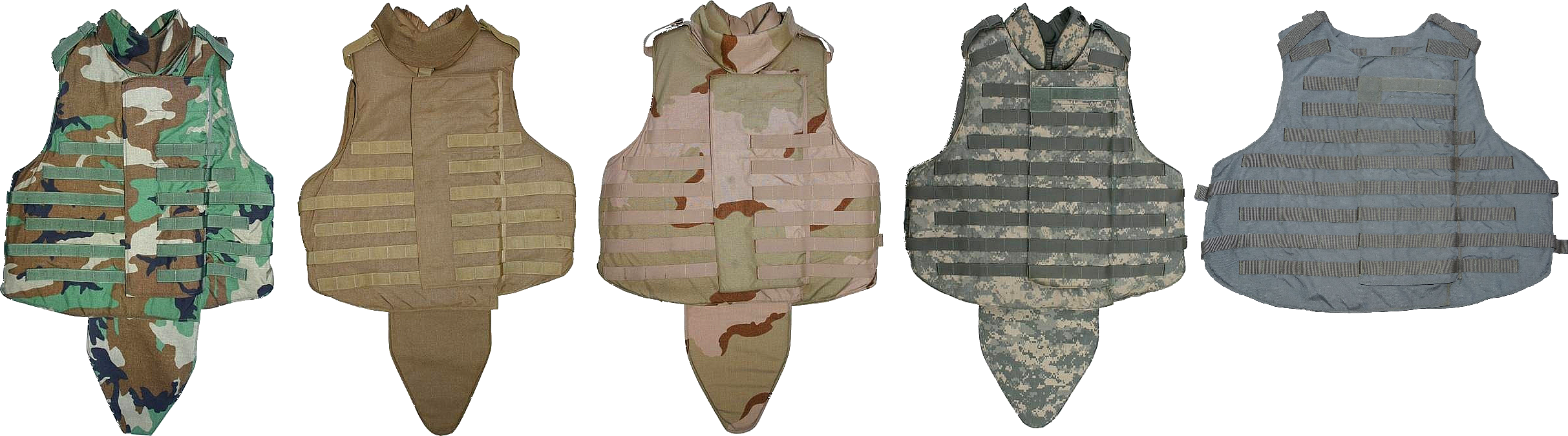
- The IBA in its various color schemes and camouflage patterns, from left to right, in "M81" U.S. woodland camouflage, coyote tan, desert camouflage, the Universal Camouflage Pattern, and Afghan police grey. These IBA vests are not equipped with the optional deltoid and side panel protectors.
- Type: Body armor
- Place of origin: United States

Service history
- In service: 2000–2020
- Used by: United States Navy; U.S. Army Reserve; U.S. Army (historical); U.S. Marine Corps (historical); U.S. Air Force (historical); See Users for other foreign military/law enforcement users
- Wars: Global War on Terrorism: War in Afghanistan; Iraq War; Second Chechen War; Russo-Georgian War; War in Yemen Russo-Ukrainian War

Production history
- Designer: DARPA
- Designed: April 1998
- Manufacturer: Point Blank Body Armor (inaugural manufacturer), UNICOR (current manufacturer, since 2008)
- Produced: July 1998 – April 2020

Specifications
- Weight: 16.4 lb (7.4 kg) (with SAPI plates used; everything in Interceptor); 8.4 lb (3.8 kg) (outer tactical vest)

The Interceptor multi-threat body armor system (IBA) is a bullet-resistant body armor system that was used by the United States Armed Forces during the 2000s, with some limited usage into the mid-2010s. IBA and its design replaced the older standardized fragmentation protective Personnel Armor System for Ground Troops (PASGT) body armor system that was designed in the late 1970s and introduced in the early 1980s.

The IBA system consists of its core component: the outer tactical vest (OTV), which can optionally be worn with a throat protector, groin protector, and biceps (or deltoid) protector. The latter three auxiliary protectors are removable from the main vest, which can be worn alone.

IBA was designed in the late 1990s as a replacement for the PASGT vest and the essentially-improvised ISAPO supplemental armor plate carrier, a combination widely criticized by US troops for its immense weight. It comes in a variety of color schemes and camouflage patterns depending on who the vest was produced for. It was used by most of the U.S. military's branches during much of the 2000s, and was even seeing limited use as late as 2015 among some National Guard units.

Beginning in 2007 the Improved Outer Tactical Vest began to replace the OTVs in the United States Army's service and since then it has been mostly replaced in its inventory, with the exception of a few OTVs still in service with the Army National Guard and U.S. Army Reserve; however, both the OTV and the newer IOTV are being replaced by the Modular Scalable Vest. The U.S. Marine Corps has replaced the OTV with the Modular Tactical Vest (MTV) and Scalable Plate Carrier (SPC), although IBA is still used by the U.S. Navy for sailors aboard its warships as of 2017 and by the U.S. Army Reserve as of 2018. Though IBA has been mostly replaced in U.S. military service, it is still used by the militaries of some other countries that have diplomatic relations with the U.S., such as Ukraine, Iraq, and Moldova. As such, the OTV, which has been in production since the late 1990s, was scheduled to be produced by the U.S. until 2020, for sale to foreign customers.

== Overview ==
=== Basic system ===
The IBA system consists of an Outer Tactical Vest (OTV) and two Small Arms Protective Insert (SAPI) ballistic plates. The OTV features a carrier shell, and three main (flexible) ballistic panel inserts (front left and front right panels, and a rear back panel), which are made with a finely woven Kevlar KM2 fiber. These two parts of the vest are both bullet and heat resistant, like the earlier PASGT Vest. However, KM2 can provide 25% more protection for less weight, which it does in the Ranger Vest.

'The soft ballistic panels are produced in five different sizes (S-XXL), which are installed into their respective pocket on the OTV carrier shell.

The Interceptor armor also has a PALS webbing grid on the front of the vest which accommodate the same type of pockets used in the modular lightweight load-carrying equipment (MOLLE) backpack/carry vest system. This allows a soldier to tailor-fit his MOLLE and body armor system. While not specifically designed for it, the loops can also easily attach all-purpose lightweight individual carrying equipment (ALICE)-based equipment, as well as many pieces of civilian-made tactical gear, and also features a large handle on the back just below the collar which can be used to drag a wounded person to safety in an emergency.

Originally the entire IBA system weighed 16.4 pounds (7.4 kg), with the large vest weighing 8.4 pounds (3.8 kg), and two plate inserts weighing 4 pounds (1.8 kg) each. This is much lighter than the previous Ranger Body Armor fielded in Somalia which weighed 25.1 pounds (11.4 kg), as well as the PASGT/ISAPO combination, which weighed even more.

Due to the increased dangers of improvised explosive devices, newer versions of the vital plates and components have been developed. The Enhanced Small Arms Protective Inserts (ESAPIs) and Enhanced Side Ballistic Inserts (ESBIs) have become available, along with the Deltoid and Axillary Protector System (DAPS). These new systems are becoming the standard for forward deployed troops. The E-SAPI plates offer increased protection from 7.62mm armor-piercing ammunition. The ESBIs is an attachable MOLLE ballistic panel with a pouch for a 8x6 side-SAPI, for protection of the side of the torso/under the arm. DAPS consists of two ambidextrous modular components, the Deltoid (upper arm) Protector and the Axillary (underarm) Protector, and provides additional protection from fragmentary and projectiles to the upper arm and underarm areas. With the OTV, E-SAPI plates (10.9 pounds (4.9 kg)), ESBIs (7.75 pounds (3.52 kg)), DAPS (5.03 pounds (2.28 kg)) and with the neck, throat and groin protectors installed the armor is significantly heavier at 33.1 pounds (15.0 kg).

=== Additional components ===
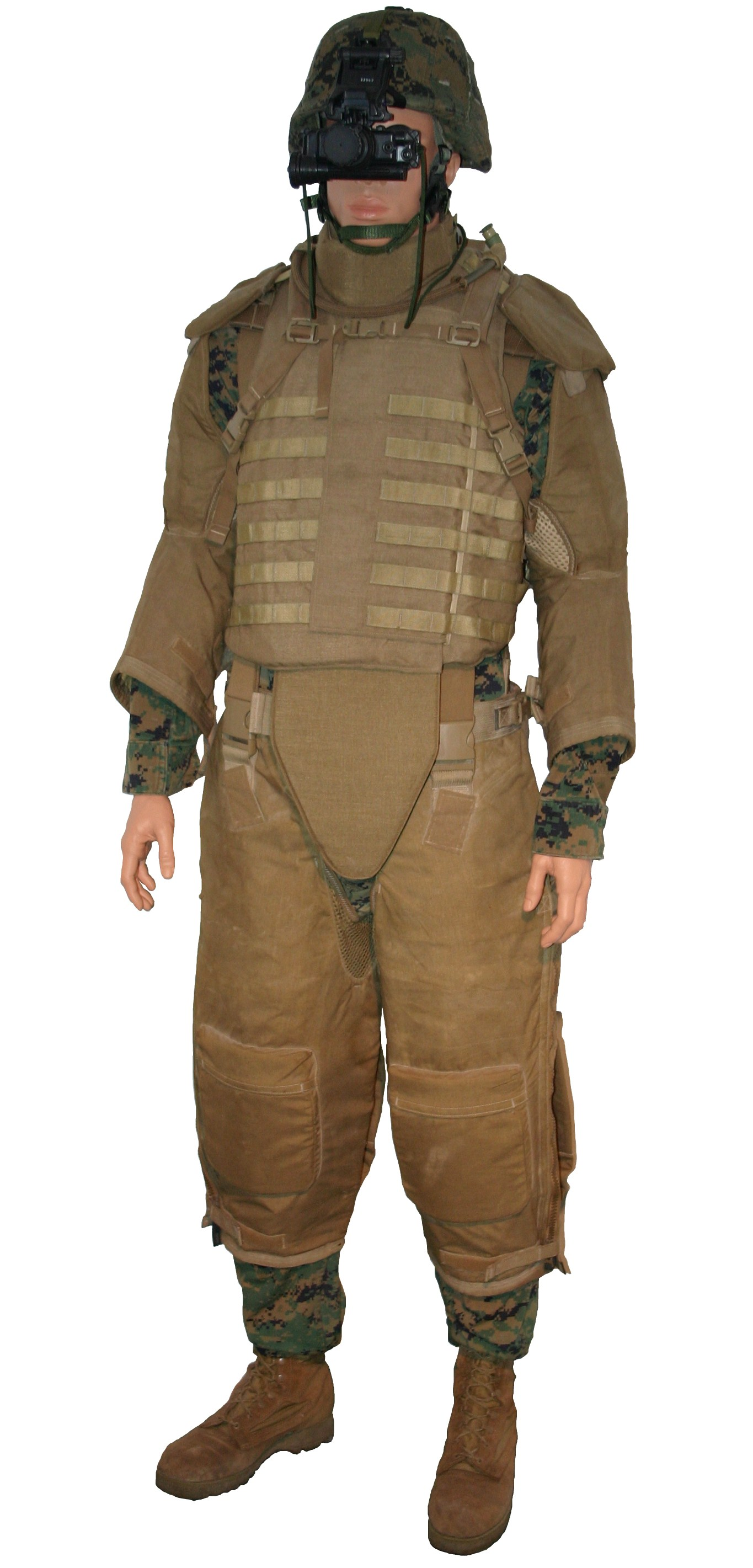
Mannequin of a U.S. Marine wearing a coyote-brown OTV and an additional corporal full protection called "Quadgard IV". This kind of protection was used by turret gunners during the Iraq War, to protect them against small arms fire and fragmentation.

To increase overall protection, separate accessories can be added to the OTV:

- Collar device that is divided in two parts, a neck and collar protector and a throat protector
- Groin protector.

The MOLLE II's Fighting Load Carrier component can be donned over an OTV to increase magazine and ease equipment carrying capacity, though it is not part of the IBA system proper.

With the need for additional accessories to protect troops, some were produced for the ground:

- Deltoid and axillary protection system (DAPS, pauldrons). (Note: The U.S. Marine Corps adopted a similar system called Armor Protection Enhancement System (APES) around 2004 and 2005. This one was considered to be uncomfortable by its wearers and did not offer sufficient protection. The Oklahoma State University (OSU) Design, Housing and Merchandizing Department led by D.H. Branson developed a full protection system that covers both arms and legs called Quadgard that quickly replaced the APES made by Point Blank Body Armor. Around 4800 sets of the Quadgard IV were sent in Iraq to be used (mainly) by turret gunners inside humvees during convoy patrols.)
- Side plate carriers
- Back extender
- Upper Legs protector, a kind of kevlar short
- Lower Extremity Body Armor (LEBA)
- Combat diapers (for example the "Tier 2 Pelvic Protection System" that was issued to U.S. Marines in Afghanistan)

=== Ballistic plates ===
The Interceptor vest was tested to stop a 9×19mm 124-grain FMJ bullet at 1,400 feet per second (430 m/s) with minimal backface deformation, and it has a V-50 of roughly 1,525 feet per second (465 m/s). This means that the bullet in question must travel faster than 1,525 feet per second (465 m/s) for it to have more than a 50% chance of penetration. (An unlikely prospect, given the muzzle velocity of a typical 9mm handgun or submachine gun). The Interceptor cannot, however, be called a Level III-A vest, since military standards do not require protection against heavy .44 Magnum ammunition. The vest will stop lower velocity fragments and has removable neck, throat, shoulder, extended back and groin protection.

Additionally, two ceramic plates may be added to the front and back of the vest, with each capable of stopping up to three hits from the round marked on the plate. For SAPI, this is a caliber of up to 7.62×51mm M80 FMJ. For ESAPI, this is a caliber of up to 30-06 M2 AP. This performance is only guaranteed when backed by the Interceptor vest, or any other soft armor which meets military requirements for protection. SAPI and ESAPI are the most technically advanced body armor fielded by the U.S. military, and are constructed of boron carbide ceramic with a Spectra shield backing that breaks down projectiles and halts their momentum.

== History ==
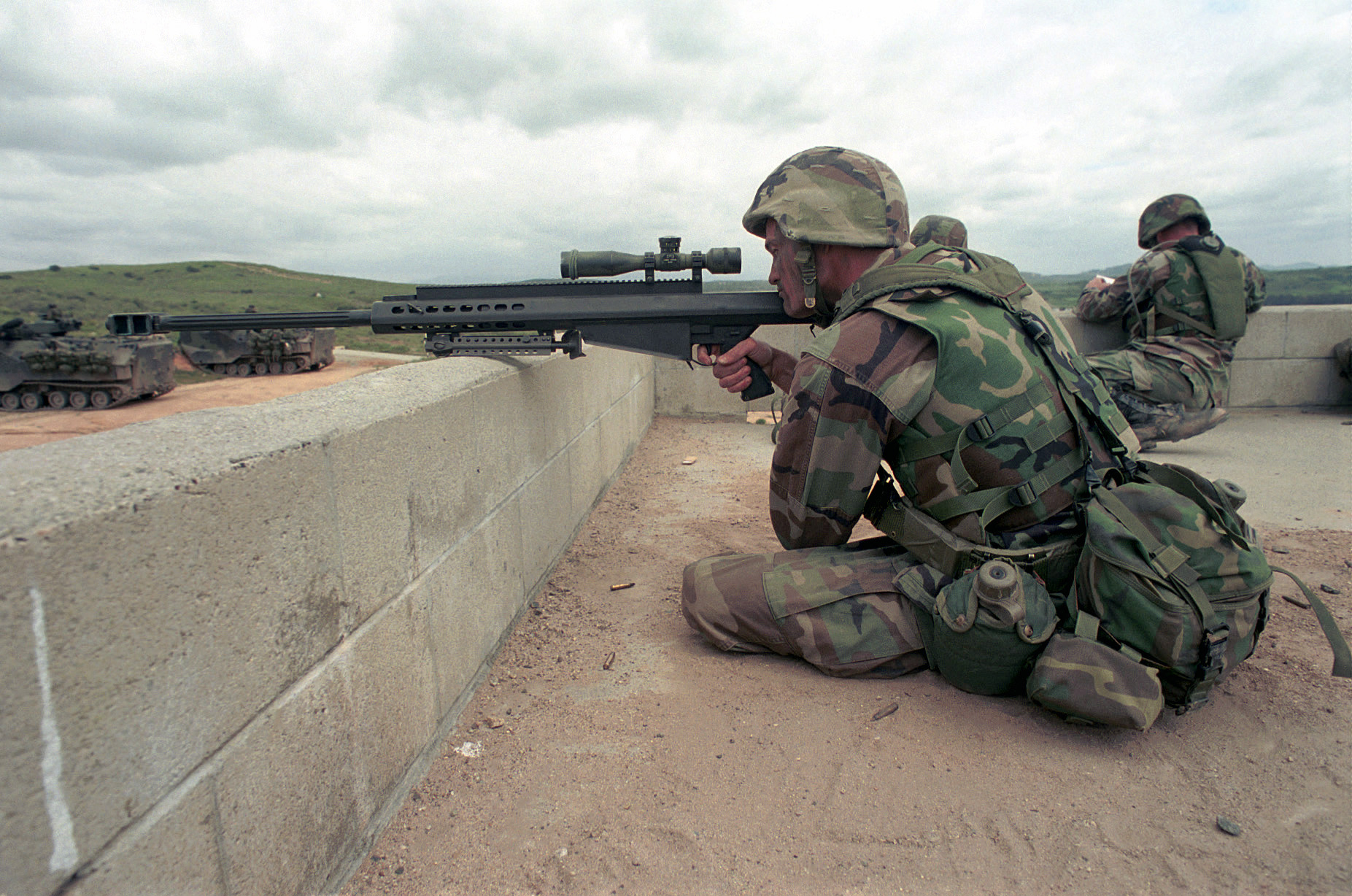
A USMC sniper wearing an IBA vest while practicing with an M82A3 anti-materiel rifle at Camp Pendleton, California in April 2001.

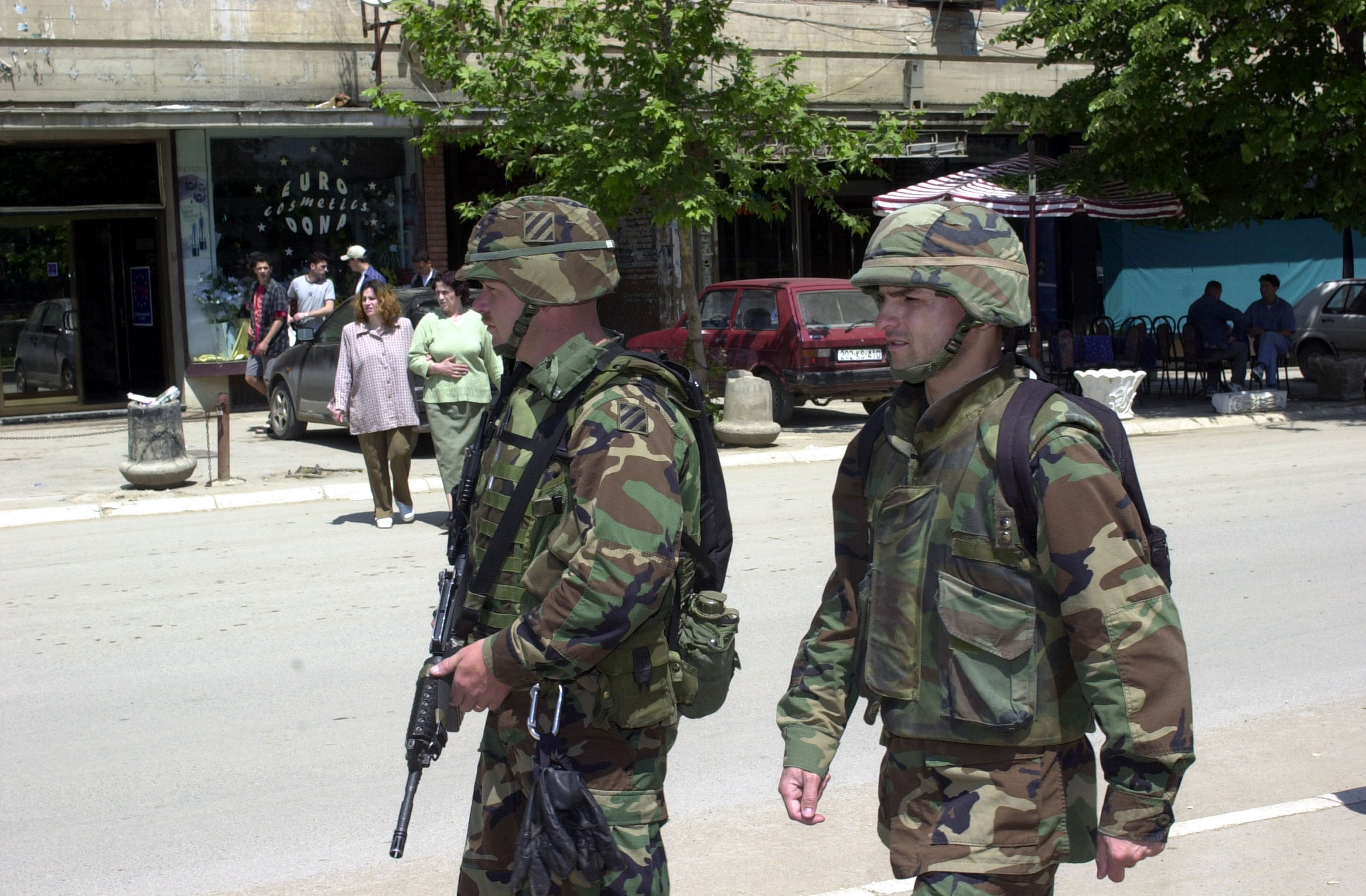
U.S. soldier (left) in Kosovo in May 2001 wearing an IBA vest.

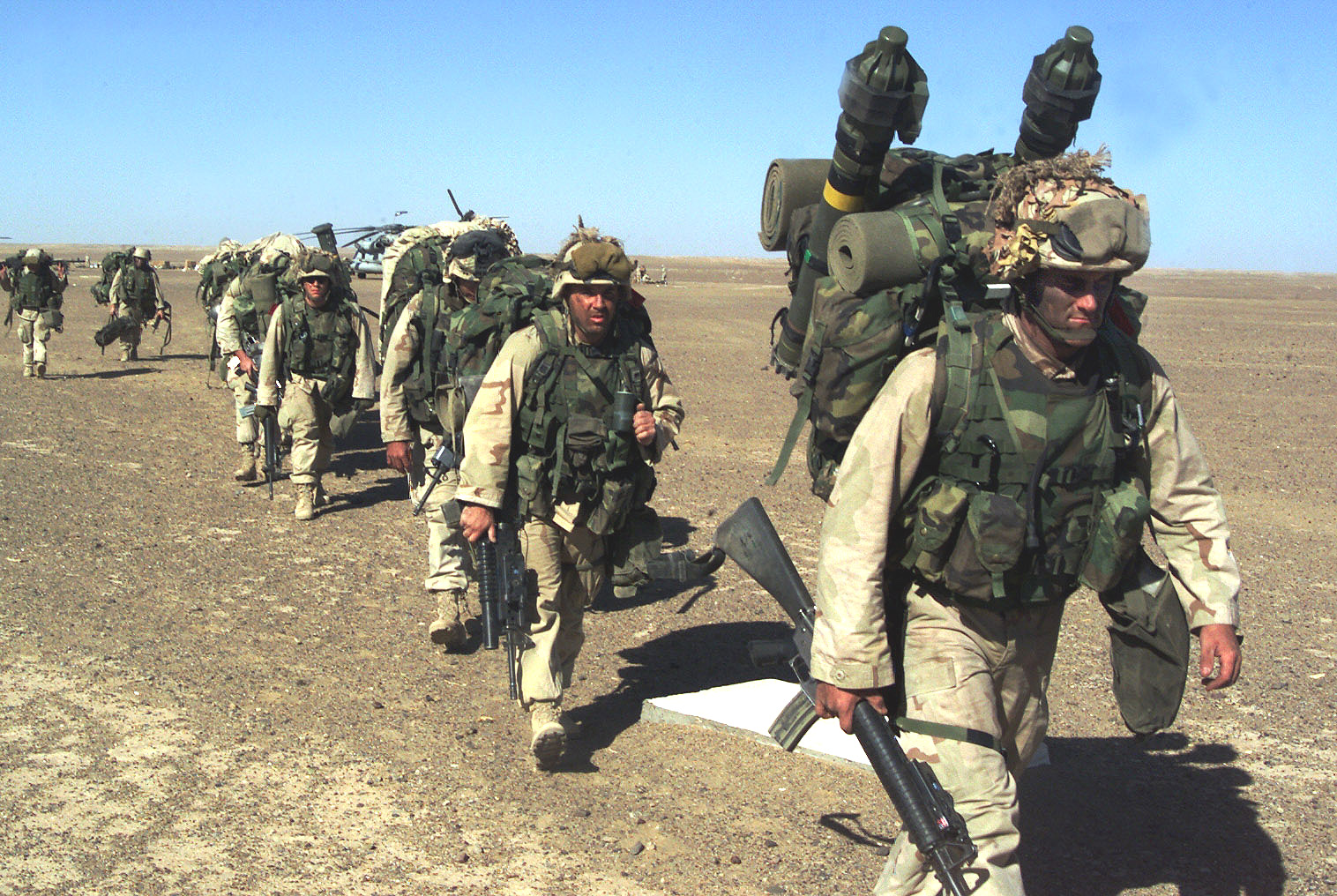
Marines from the U.S. 15th Marine Expeditionary Unit marching while wearing IBA and MOLLE components in November 2001, during the War in Afghanistan.

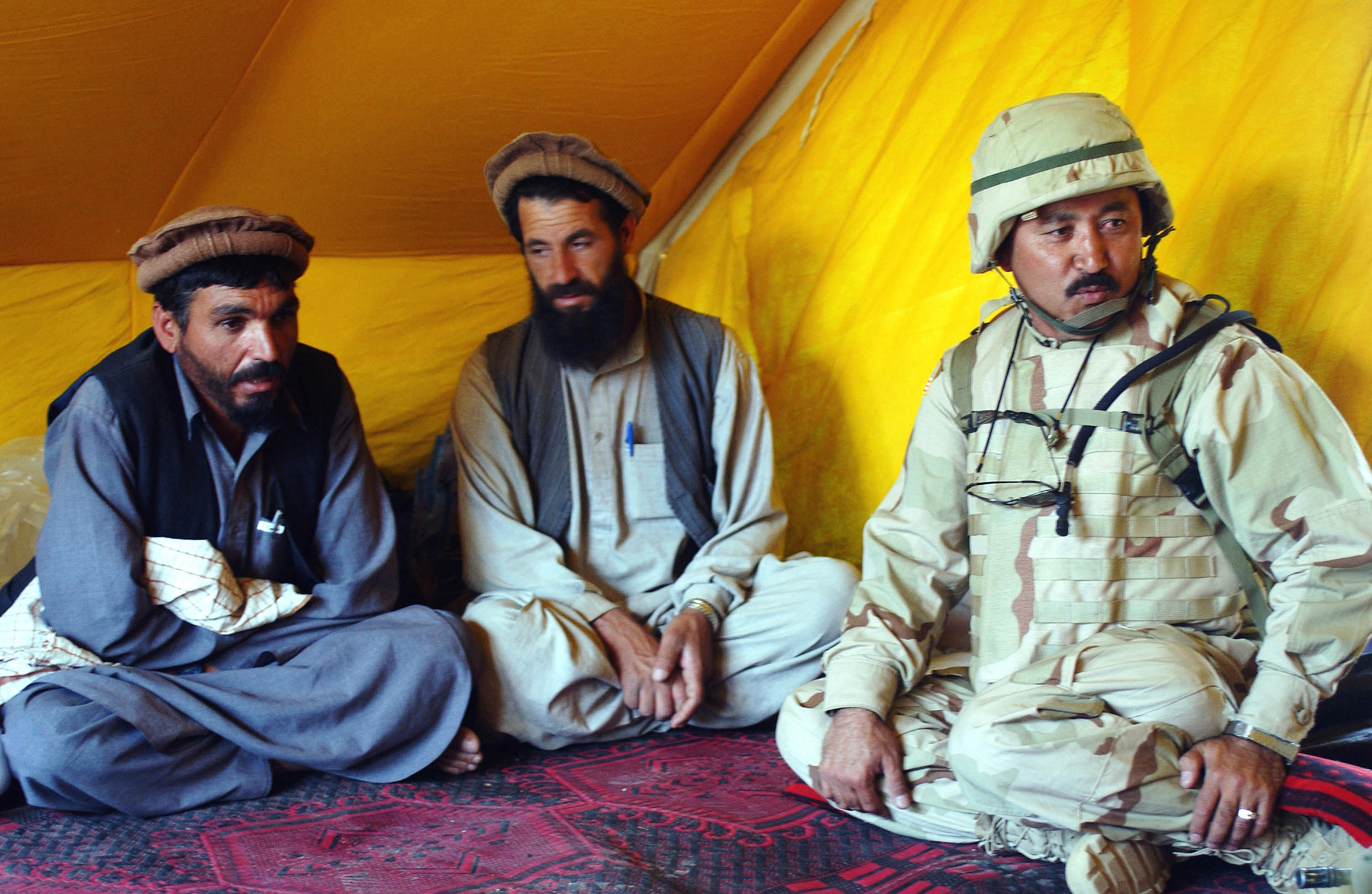
A linguistic interpreter in June 2002 wearing DCU-patterned IBA in Afghanistan.

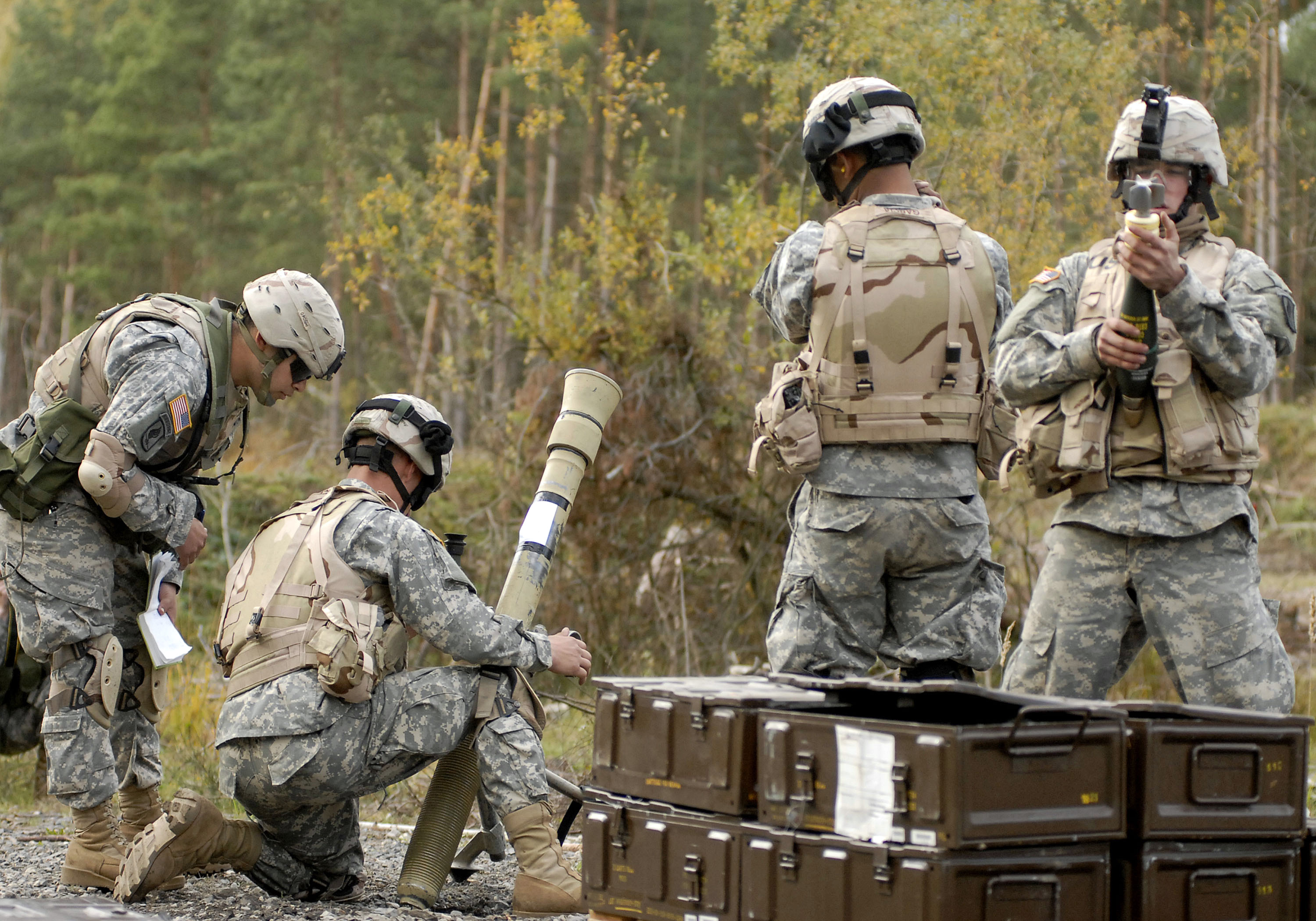
A U.S. Army mortar crew in 2006 wearing IBA in the DCU camouflage pattern.

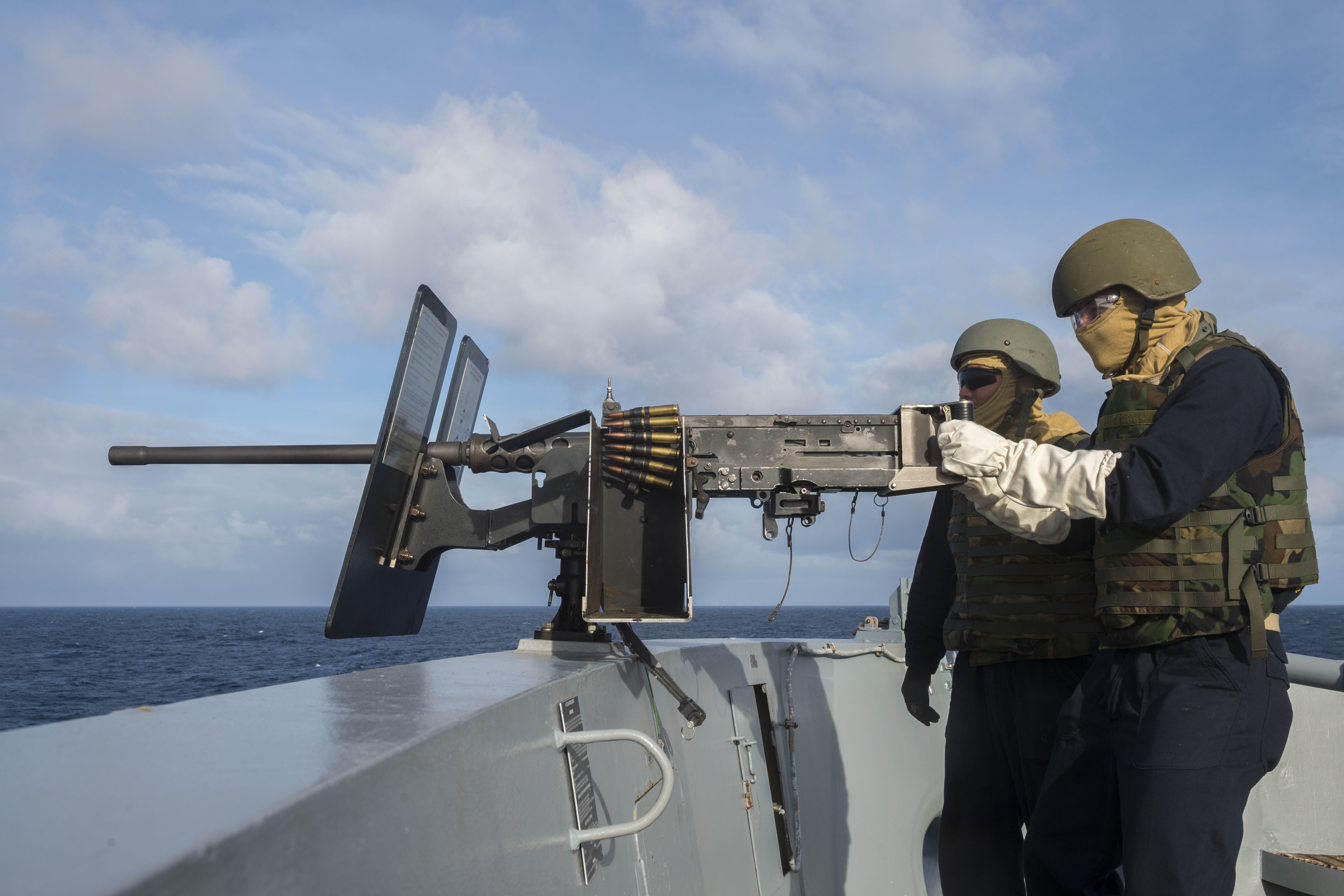
U.S. Navy sailors in June 2017 wearing OTVs aboard USS Green Bay in the "M81" woodland pattern.

=== Development and production ===
Materials for the Interceptor vest were developed by DARPA in the 1990s, and a contract for production was awarded to DHB Industries' Point Blank Body Armor, Inc., by the U.S. Army Soldier Systems Center. IBA was announced on April 13, 1998, and the contract to manufacture IBA was awarded to an Oakland Park, Florida-based company under a five-year indefinite delivery/indefinite quantity contract in late July 1998, and the body armor went into full production later that year.

In 2007, news reports were being issued on the lack of protection from hard and soft plated body armor from lethal rounds. Due to the coverage of these reports, comparative studies were done on the effectiveness of U.S. Military body armor, included IBA. IBA's performance was deemed inferior compared to other body armor designs and published on the news. The large coverage from this report led to Dean G. Popps, the Acting United States Assistant Secretary of the Army for Acquisition, Logistics, and Technology, to direct all first article testing (FAT) of IBA to the Army Test and Evaluation Command (ATEC). The command headquarters are located at Aberdeen Proving Ground (APG) as a part of the Army Research Laboratory (ARL).

The Interceptor body armor components come in a number of variants. Camouflage patterns include:

- "M81" U.S. woodland, used by the U.S. Navy and foreign militaries
- Three-color "Desert Camouflage Uniform" desert (less common than woodland and coyote brown)
- The Universal Camouflage Pattern, used by the U.S. Army and U.S. Air Force, largely superseded by the IOTV and its components

Solid colors include:

- Coyote brown (referred to by the DoD as "coyote tan")
- Grey, used by the Afghan National Police service.

The original Interceptor outer tactical vest (OTV) variant first began to be issued to the U.S. Armed Forces in 2000, though by September 2001 relatively few had actually been fielded. The first OTV carriers were first produced in woodland camouflage pattern (one initial contractor for the early OTVs was Point Blank, Inc). Quickly, a coyote-brown variant was made for the USMC, seeing use during the 2003 invasion of Iraq. Marines used OTVs in both woodland and coyote-brown camouflages in Iraq and Afghanistan. In the U.S. Army, the Woodland camouflage pattern was then superseded by the 3-color Desert Combat pattern, followed by the Universal Camouflage Pattern.

Later versions of the OTV made in the mid-to-late 2000s and the 2010s feature more PALS loops on the front and back of the OTV component, hook-and-loop "Velcro" fasteners on the front for nametapes and rank patches, whereas older models from the early 2000s did not. Said later version is commonly referred to as the "second generation" OTV.

As part of U.S. President George W. Bush's $87 billion package for ongoing operations in Afghanistan and Iraq, $300 million was earmarked for body armor. A complete Interceptor system costs $1,585. The Interceptor system's component ceramic plates currently cost about $500 each.

OTVs are still being made today, primarily for the U.S. Army, which then in turn sells them to foreign countries and international customers under the "Foreign Military Sales" (FMS) program. They have been made by convict labor provided the UNICOR company since 2008 and are scheduled to be made until at least April 2020. OTVs in the woodland and desert camouflage patterns along with coyote brown color scheme were being made as late as early 2014.

=== Replacement ===
==== U.S. Army ====
On May 10, 2006, the U.S. Army announced it was holding an open competition for companies to design an entirely new generation of body armor "to improve on and replace" the Interceptor Body Armor's vest component. The Army said it wanted ideas from companies by May 31. Congressional investigators reportedly reviewed the Pentagon's entire body armor program, including the OTV. Investigators expressed concern that the vests might not be adequate to protect troops.

Aside from replacing the SAPI vital plates with the improved E-SAPI plates, the body armor vests have also been redesigned, improved and enhanced with the introduction of the Improved Outer Tactical Vest, or "IOTV" (which began to be issued to ground combat units from mid-to-late 2007), in the U.S. Army.

The OTV along with IOTV and SPCS will eventually be replaced by the Modular Scalable Vest.

==== U.S. Marine Corps ====
After initially using IBA as their main body armor system, the U.S. Marine Corps developed a completely new armor system, the Modular Tactical Vest, which was their primary body armor system in Iraq. On September 25, 2006, the Marine Corps announced that Protective Products International won a contract for 60,000 new Modular Tactical Vests (MTV) to replace the Interceptor OTV vests. The MTV provides greater coverage, superior weight distribution, and additional features including as a quick-release system. Some U.S. Navy ground force personnel (such as seabees and hospital corpsmen) use the Modular Tactical Vest. Other Navy personnel on Individual Augmentee assignments use the Army's body armor systems.

Not adapted for the mountainous environment of Afghanistan, the Modular Tactical Vest (MTV) was replaced by the Scalable Plate Carrier (SPC), a lighter alternative, which is their primary body armor system for Afghanistan.

Since January 2009, the U.S. Marine Corps is seeking for replacements for both MTV and SPC that are commonly issued. The MTV has received top ratings by many U.S. Marines; although a few Marines have complained about minor elements of it and an updated version will soon be released which deals with these elements. The Improved Modular Tactical Vest (IMTV) and Improved Scalable Plate Carrier (ISPC) are the new models. "The IMTV will be the main body armor system for Marines, the Corps plans to order about 70,000 of the improved plate carriers, far more than the estimated 10,000 to 14,000 plate carriers in use today".

== Effectiveness ==
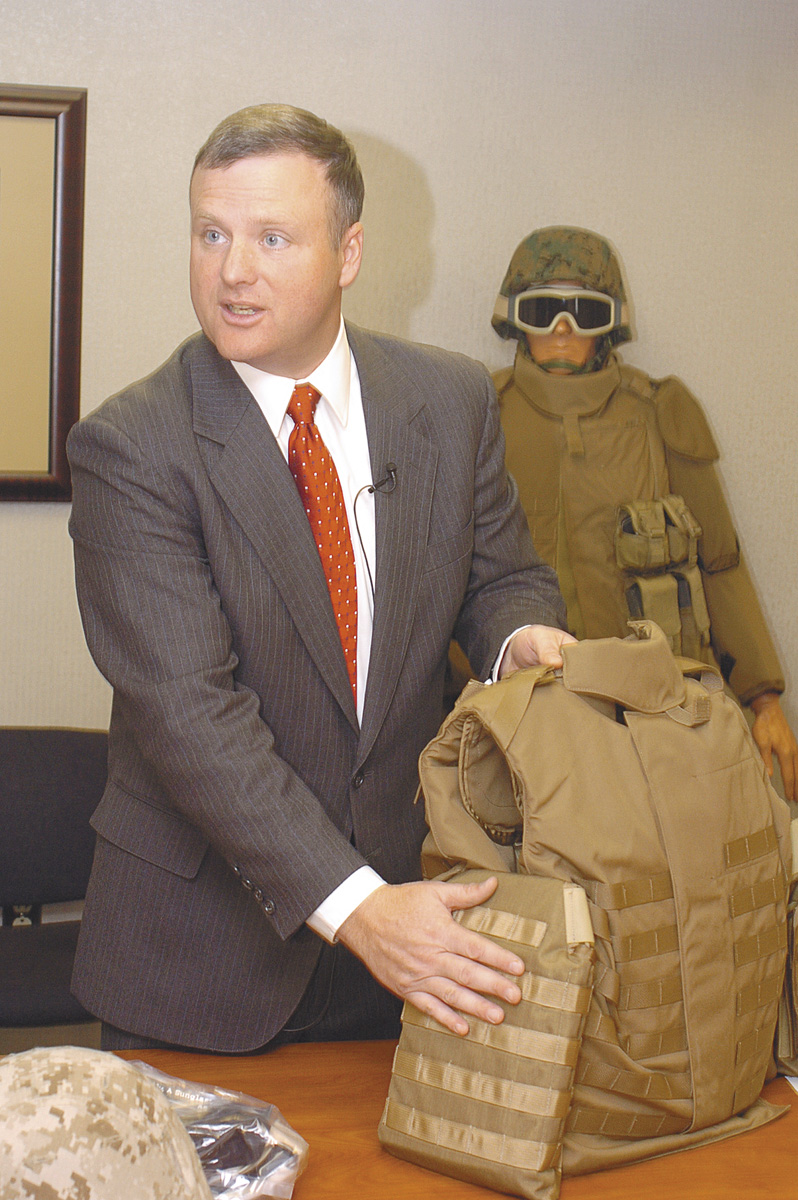
An Interceptor vest with additional side SAPI plates and neck protector in 2005, with a set of full-body armor in the background.

=== Discussion ===
Body armor is always a compromise: mobility and comfort (and with it speed and stamina) are inevitably sacrificed to some degree when greater protection is achieved. This is a point of contention in the U.S. armed forces, with some favoring less armor in order to maintain mobility and others wanting as much protection as is practical. Troops who primarily ride in vehicles generally want the highest practical level of protection from IEDs and ambushes, while dismounted infantry often make the case that impaired mobility can prove just as fatal as inadequate armor.

=== Controversies ===
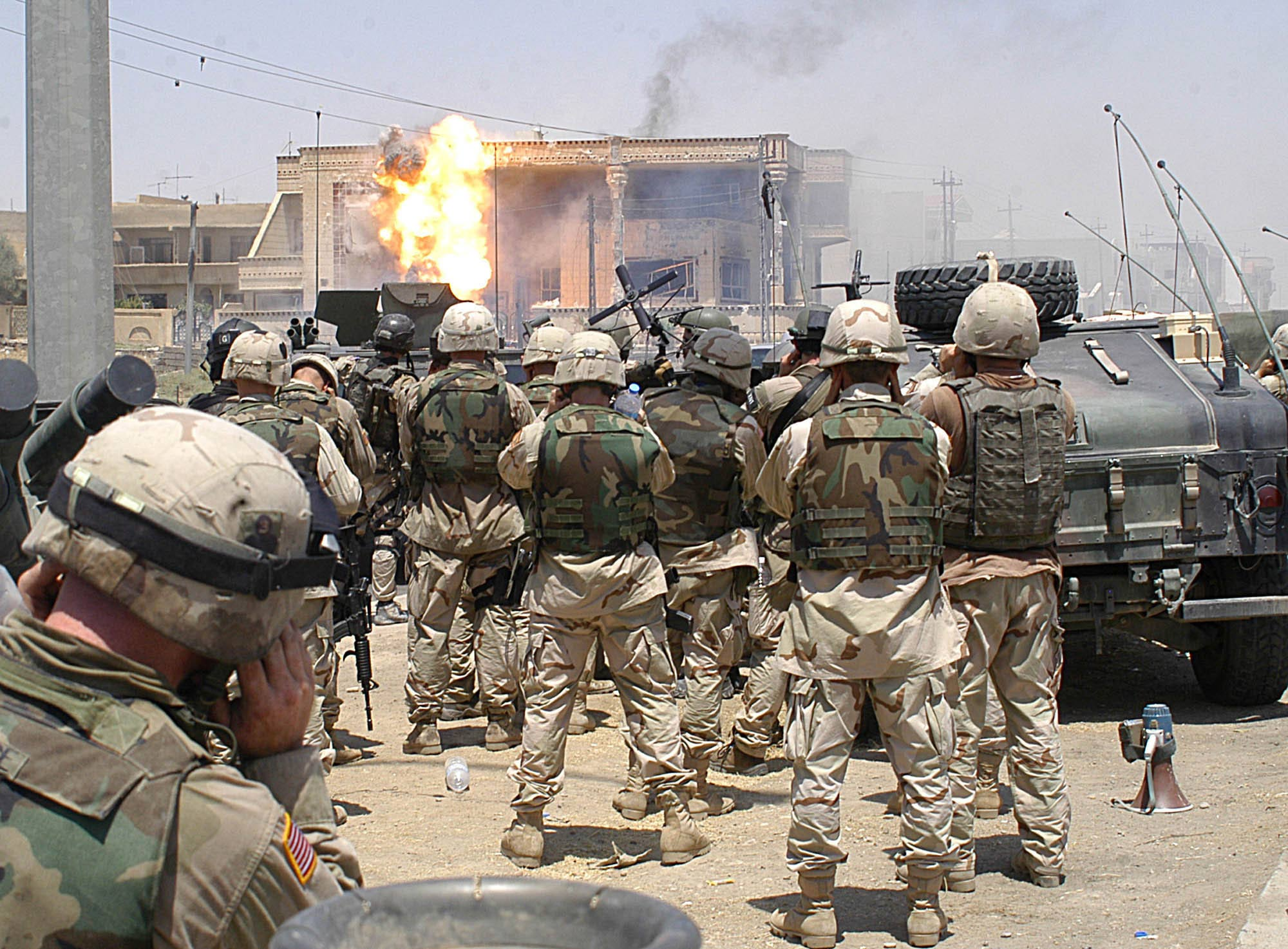
U.S. soldiers in 2003 wearing woodland-patterned IBA vests atop DCUs. Prior to the introduction of the Army Combat Uniform in mid-to-late 2005 most U.S. soldiers wore the woodland-patterned IBA; although DCU-patterned vests existed they were relatively rare.

Most OTVs were made in the "M81" U.S. woodland camouflage pattern initially. As a result, during the Iraq War prior to the adoption of the Army Combat Uniform, most U.S. Army soldiers in Iraq were wearing woodland-patterned OTVs atop Desert Camouflage Uniforms, resulting in them being easier to spot from a distance in a desert environment like Iraq.

On 4 May 2005 the U.S. Marine Corps recalled 5,277 Interceptor OTVs made by DHB's Point Blank unit after news reports about the vests' inability to stop 9 mm bullets. In November 2005, the Marine Corps ordered 10,342 Interceptor outer tactical vests pulled from the operating forces after media reports indicated some samples tested by the manufacturer and by the U.S. Army's Aberdeen Proving Ground in Maryland failed to fully comply with ballistics standards.

A U.S. Marine Corps forensic study obtained by DefenseWatch criticizes the Interceptor OTV body armor system. The report says: "As many as 42% of the Marine casualties who died from isolated torso injuries could have been prevented with improved protection in the areas surrounding the plated areas of the vest. Nearly 23% might have benefited from protection along the mid-axillary line of the lateral chest. Another 15% died from impacts through the unprotected shoulder and upper arm."

=== Alternatives ===
Private purchase of commercial body armor for combat use by soldiers is not authorized by the U.S. Army. A spokesman voiced concerns in 2004 about armor that had not been "tested, certified or approved" by the Army. In 2005, the DoD, under severe pressure from Congress after the recalls, authorized a one-time $1,000 reimbursement to soldiers who had purchased civilian body armor and other gear. In 2006 they gave orders not to wear anything but military issued body armor because of fears that inadequate armor could be purchased, mainly body armor that had inadequate blunt force trauma protection.

== Users ==
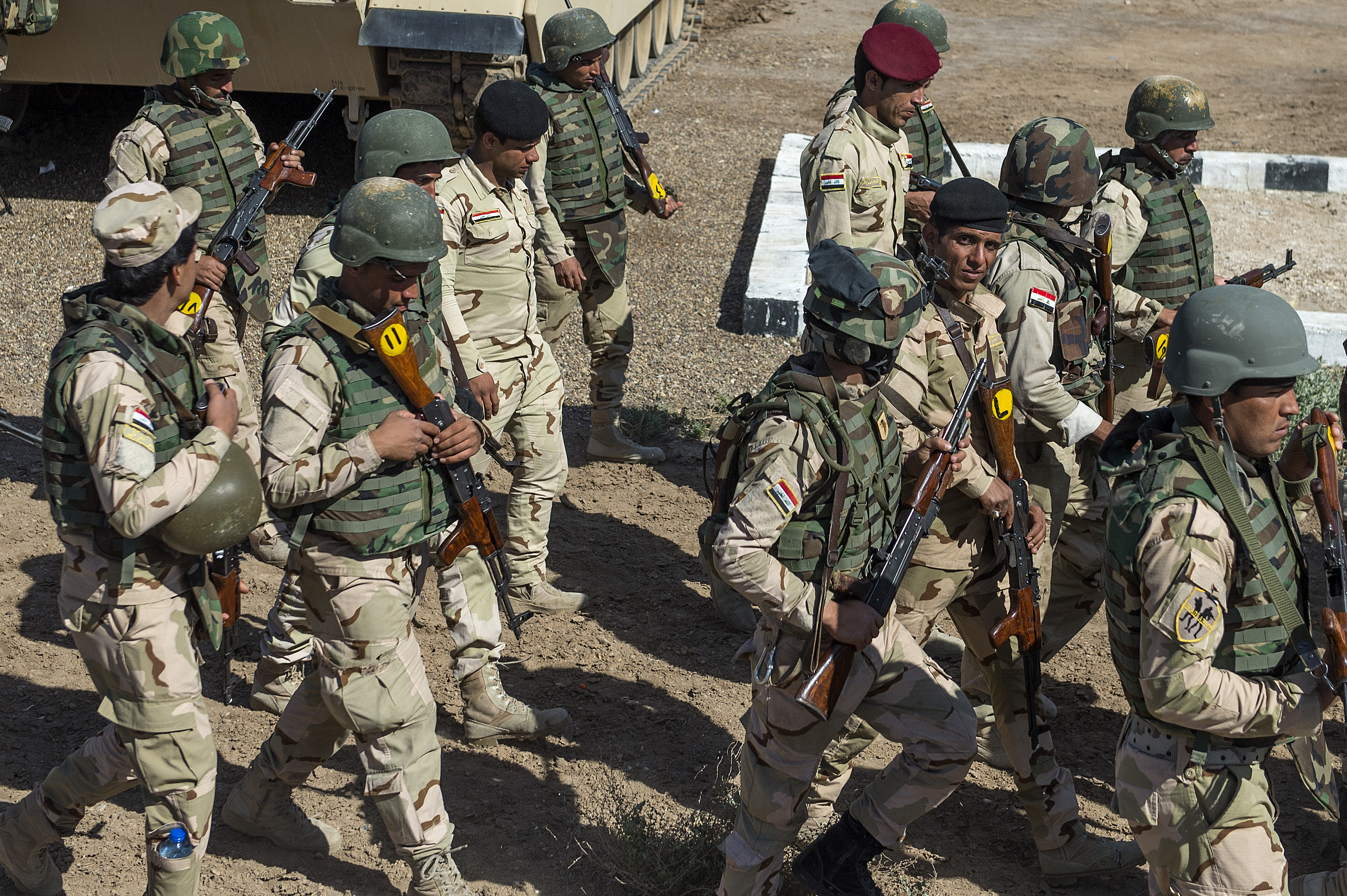
Iraqi soldiers in 2015 wearing woodland-patterned IBAs.

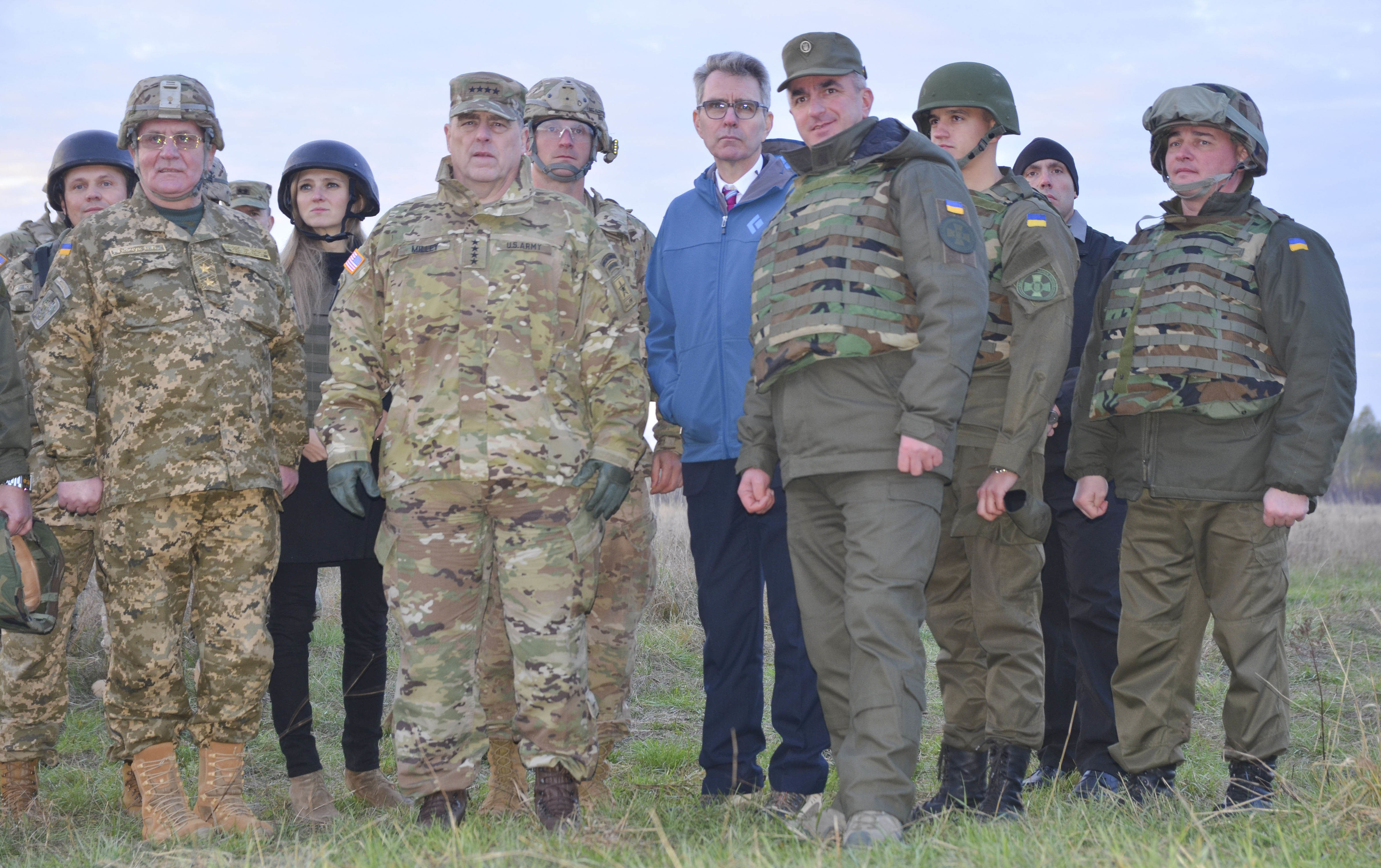
Ukrainian soldiers (right) wearing the IBA in October 2015

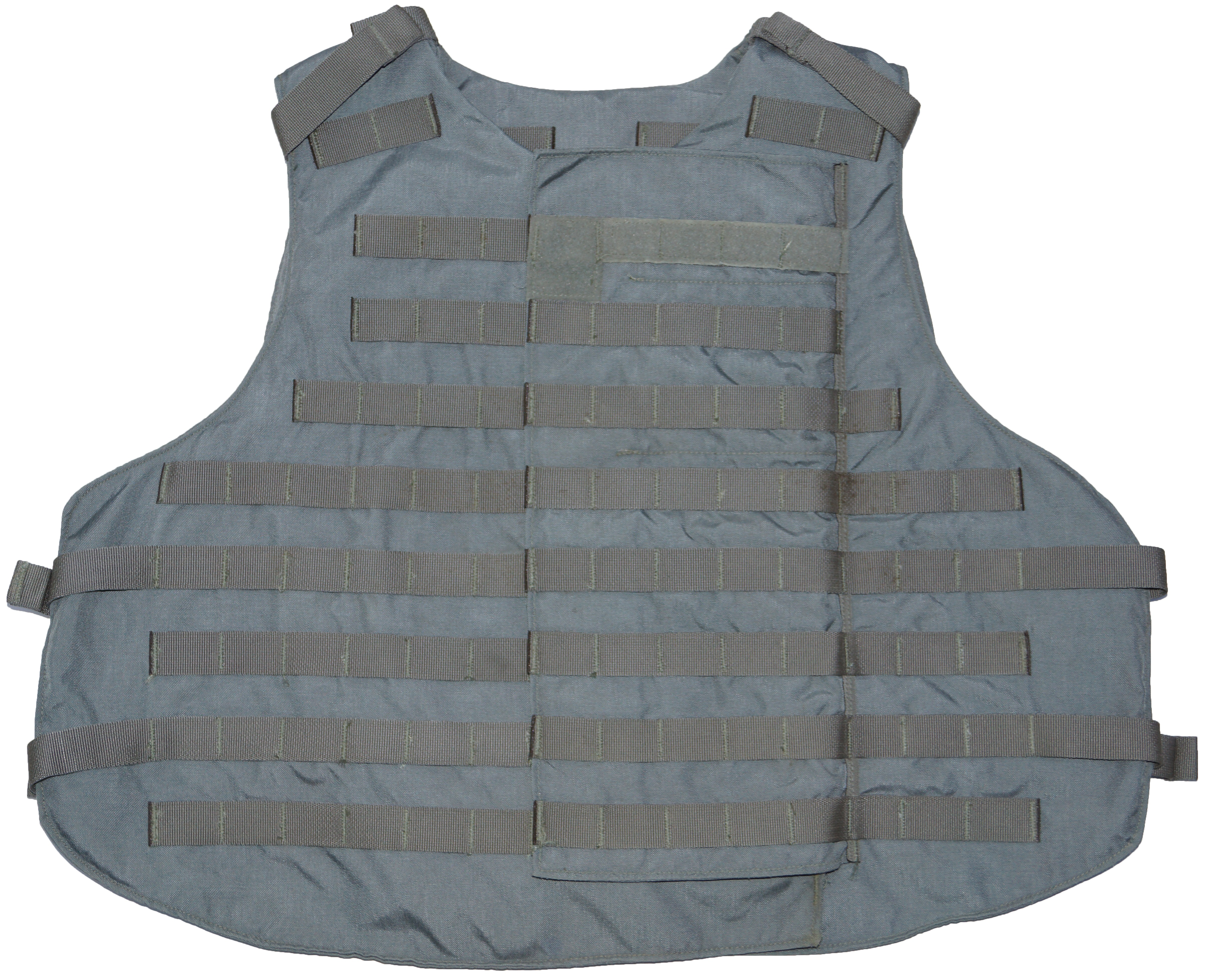
Afghan police grey OTV, front view

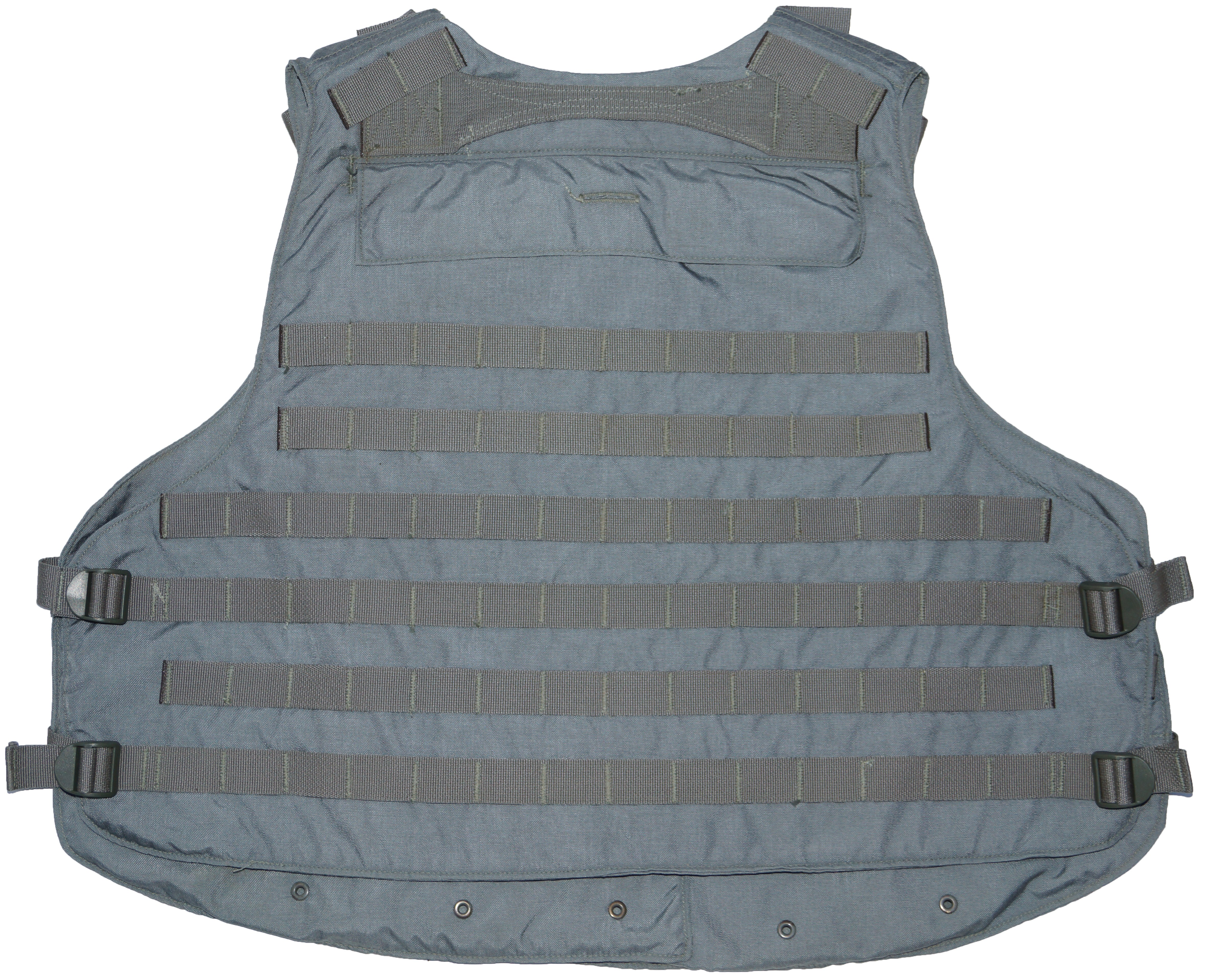
Afghan police grey OTV, rear view

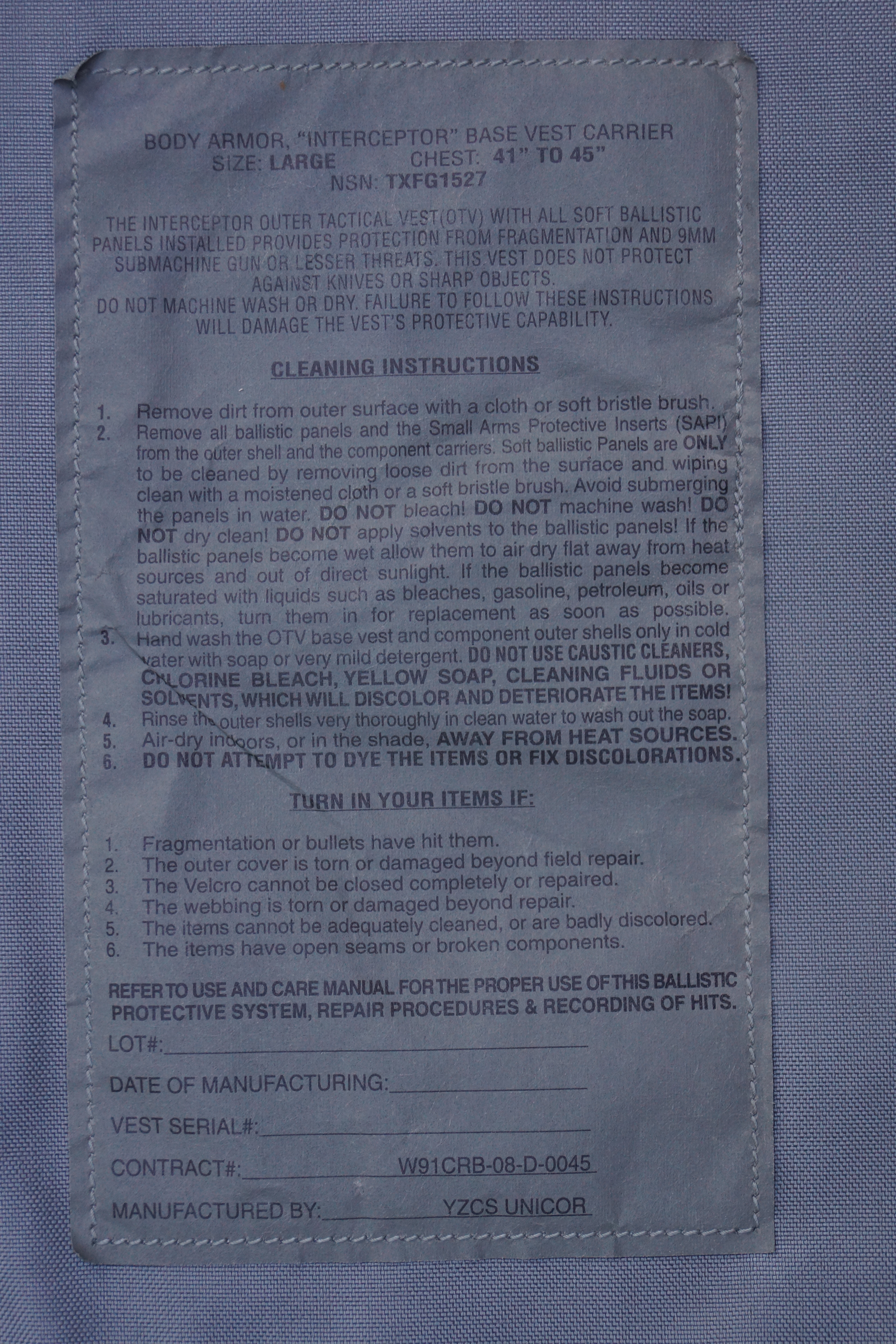
Afghan police grey OTV, detail of the label

- Afghanistan: The Afghan National Police forces were issued a grey OTV. The Afghan military was issued with OTVs in "M81" U.S. woodland.
- Albania: Woodland variants are worn by Albanian Army
- Azerbaijan
- Bangladesh
- Bosnia and Herzegovina: Coyote brown variants are worn by the Armed Forces of Bosnia and Herzegovina as of October 2018.
- Brazil: Worn by the Brazilian Marines as of 2017.
- Burundi: Used by the Burundian Army as of September 2014.
- Chile used by the Chilean Marines Corps during the 2000s to the early 2010s
- El Salvador
- Georgia: In the late 2000s, Georgian soldiers were issued the OTV in DCU's camouflage and a domestically produced woodland camouflage pattern similar to MARPAT, which were replaced by indigenously produced body armor.
- Iraq: The Iraqi military uses the DCU-patterned version of the OTV in addition to an "M81" woodland-patterned one.
- Kazakhstan
- Lebanon: The U.S. delivered OTVs to Lebanon in 2009.
- Moldova: The U.S. delivered OTVs to Moldova in 2009. Versions in woodland camouflage are used by the Moldovan Special Forces and the Moldovan 22nd Peacekeeping Battalion.
- Namibia: Used by the Namibian marines as of 2016.
- Pakistan: In use by the Pakistani Air Force as of 2007. The U.S. delivered additional OTVs to Pakistan in early 2009.
- Philippines: The U.S. delivered OTVs to the Philippines in 2009. They are in the "M81" woodland camouflage pattern and are worn by the Philippine Army.
- Saudi Arabia: Saudi Arabian soldiers wear the coyote brown IBA components.
- Turkey: The U.S. delivered IBA components to Turkey in late 2008.

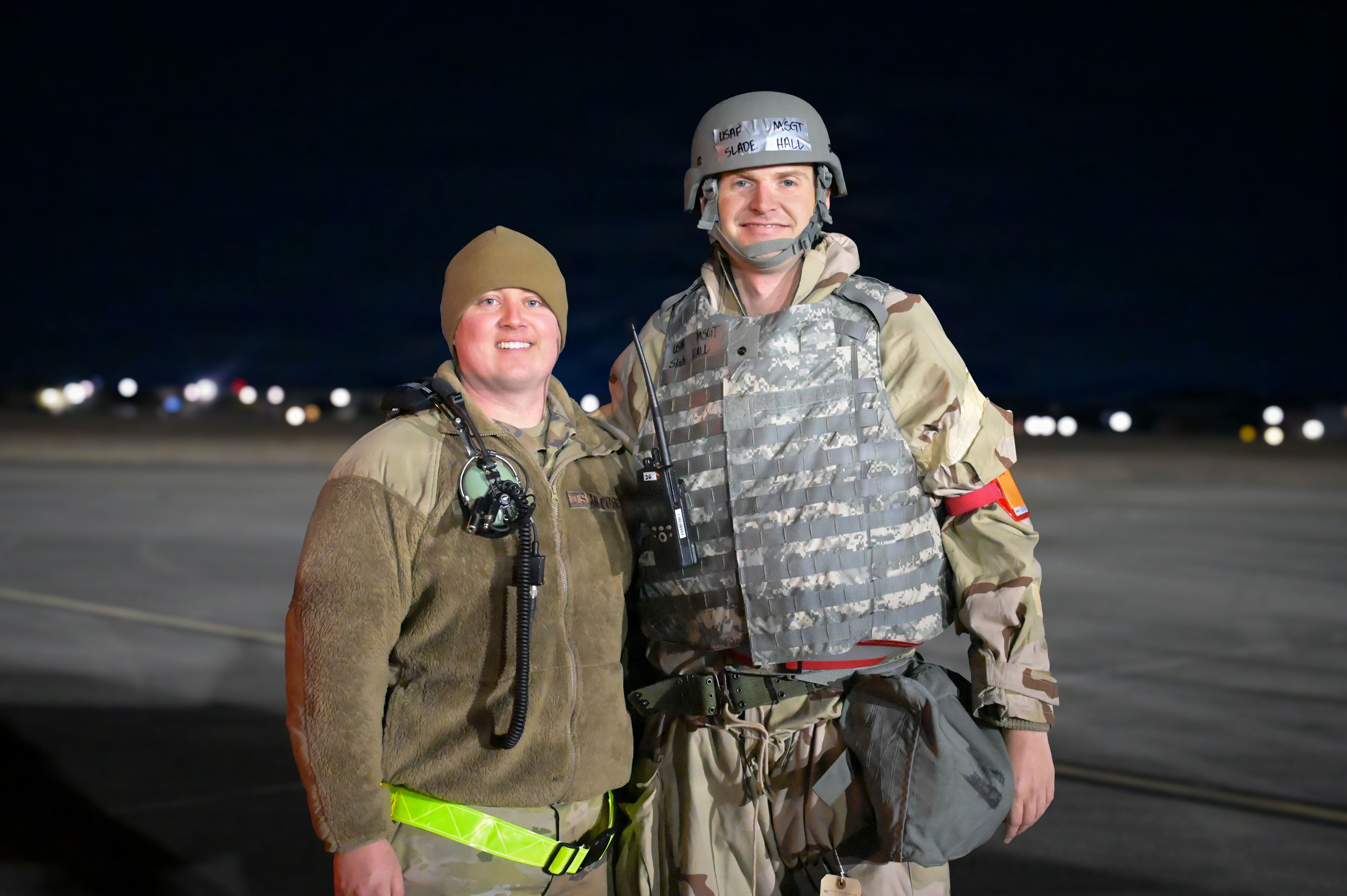
United States Air Force airmen wearing IBA in February 2026.

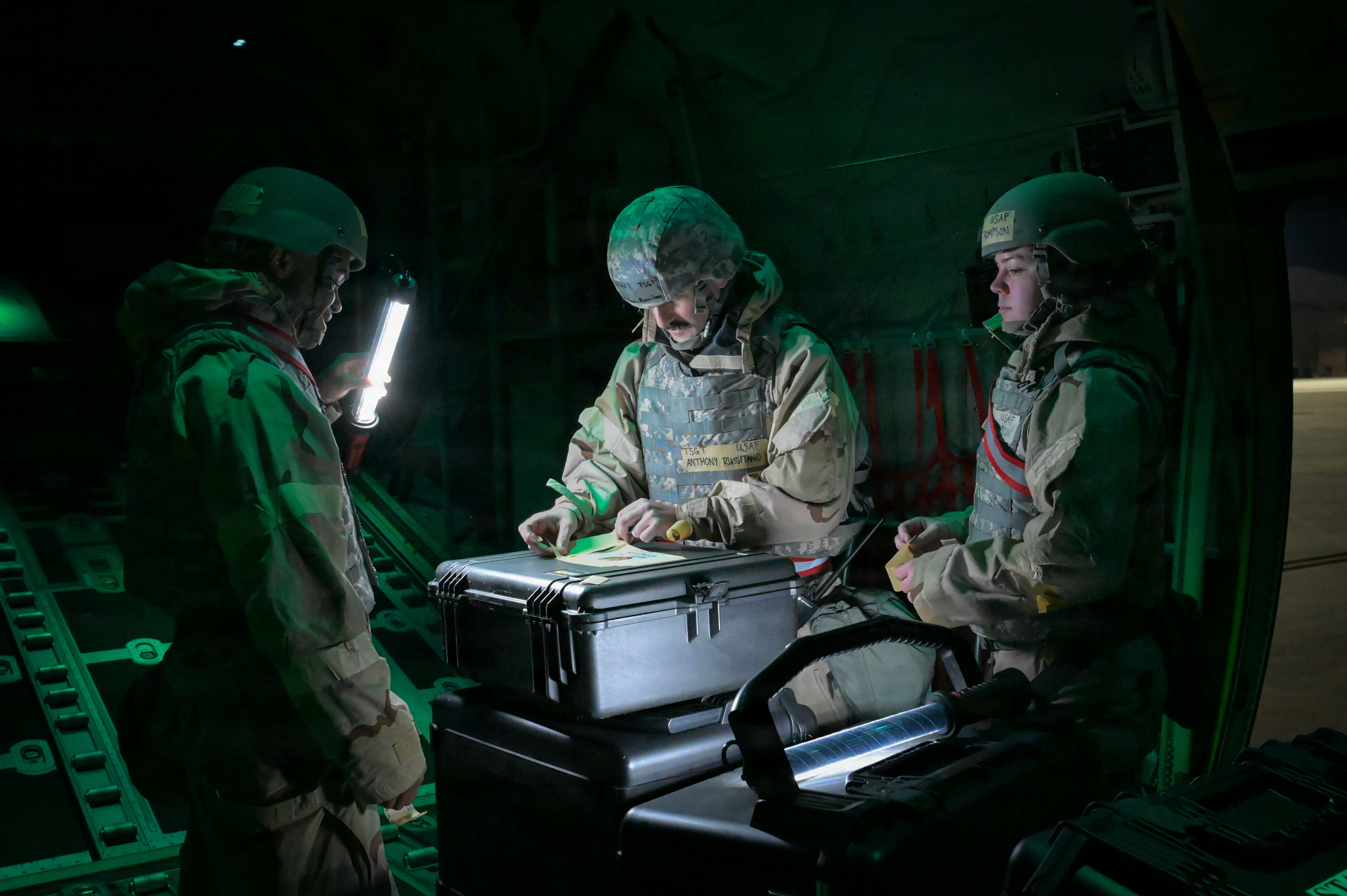
United States Air Force airmen with IBA in February 2026.

- Ukraine: In use as of October 2015; 2,000 vests were delivered from the U.S. in 2014 and were tested.
- United States: The U.S. Army and U.S. Marine Corps began being issued IBA components in 2001. Since then, the OTV component has been replaced with the IOTV for the U.S. Army and the MTV and SPC for the U.S. Marines. The U.S. Army Reserve (as of 2018), Army National Guard (as of 2020), and U.S. Navy still use the OTV, the latter aboard its warships (as of June 2017).
- Yemen: The U.S. delivered OTVs to Yemen in 2010.

== See also ==
- Improved Outer Tactical Vest (IOTV) has been the U.S. Army standard issue since 2007
- Soldier Plate Carrier System (SPCS), lighter alternative of IOTV
- Modular Scalable Vest (MSV) has been the U.S. Army standard issue since 2018
- Modular Tactical Vest, also known as the MTV
- Personnel Armor System for Ground Troops, also known as PASGT
