= Soldier Plate Carrier System =

US Army SPCS or KDH Magnum TAC-1

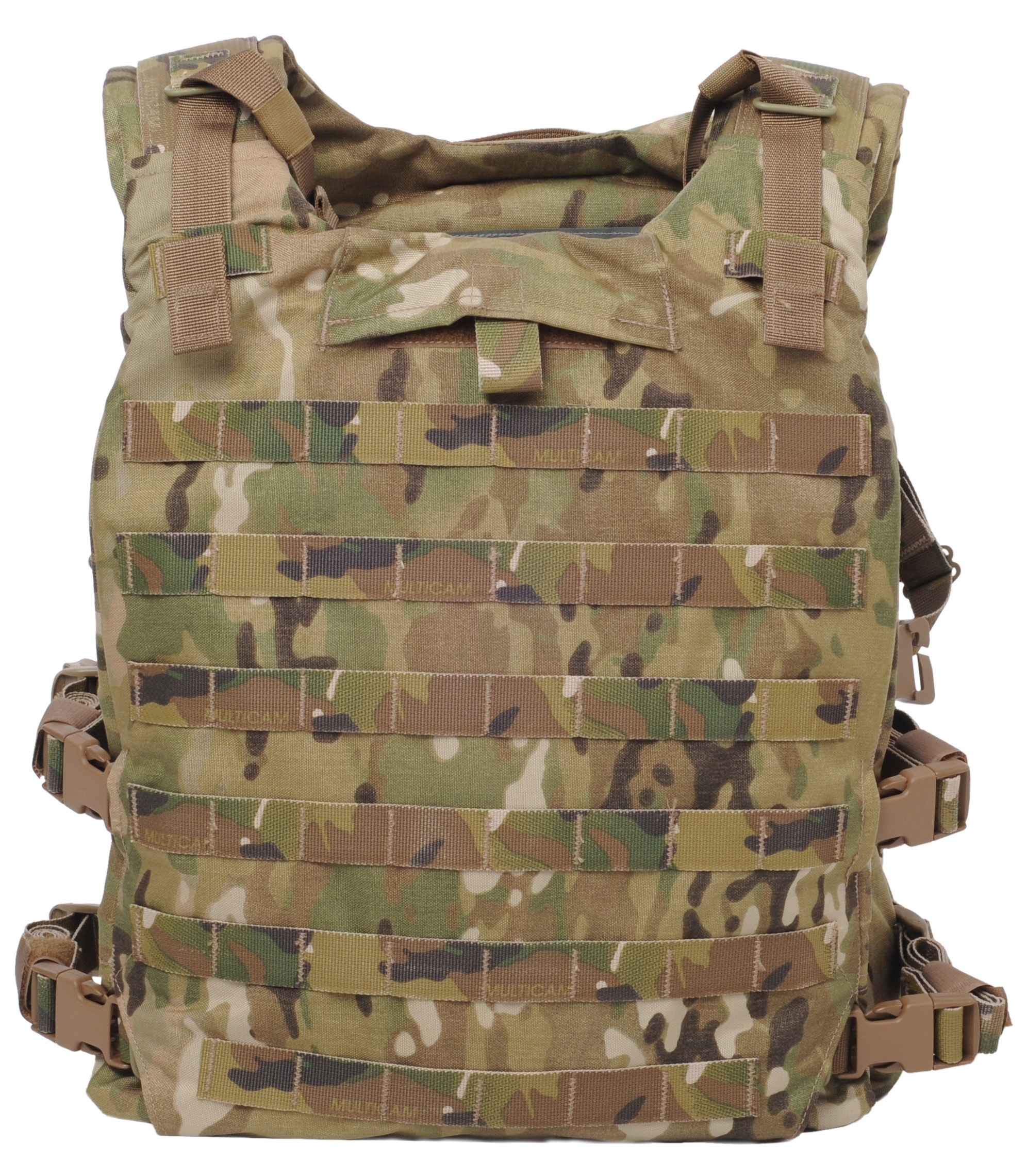
- A Soldier Plate Carrier in MultiCam camouflage
- Type: Bulletproof vest
- Place of origin: United States

Service history
- Used by: See Users
- Wars: In U.S. service: Global War on Terrorism; Operation Enduring Freedom; Operation Resolute Support; Operation Inherent Resolve; In non-U.S. service: 2022 Russian invasion of Ukraine

Production history
- Designer: KDH Defense Systems

Specifications
- Weight: approx. 22 lbs (about 10 kg)

The Soldier Plate Carrier System (SPCS), known commercially as the KDH Magnum TAC-1, is a plate carrier developed for the U.S. Army which provides protection in accordance with, if not greater than, the Improved Outer Tactical Vest. The SPCS is a lighter alternative to the IOTV, with increased mobility and comfort. The MSV (Modular Scalable Vest), part of the US Army's SPS (Soldier Protection System), is intended to replace all currently fielded body armor systems.

== History ==
In 2009 the U.S. Army began testing various commercial, off-the-shelf plate carriers for issuing to troops deploying to Afghanistan as a lighter and more comfortable alternative to the IOTV. The KDH Defense Systems Magnum TAC-1 plate carrier was chosen over other competitors. An initial contract worth $18.6 million was signed with KDH for 57,000 plate carriers.

Contractors include KDH Defense Systems (first generation), and Carter Enterprises (second generation).

== Design ==
Ballistic protection is provided by the Small Arms Protective Insert (SAPI) family of plates (also used in the IOTV), and soft armor behind the plates. Enhanced Side Ballistic Insert (ESBI) plates can be optionally attached with soft armor behind them as well. Initially the SPCS offered only a side plate pouch, however a cummerbund is now available as an alternative. Alternatively, a set of straps can be use in place of the side plate pouch and cummerbund if no side armor or MOLLE webbing is needed. The standard IOTV groin protector and lower back protector can be optionally mounted.

Several sizes of the SPCS are available, and the fitting can be adjusted using the friction adapters on the cummerbund and padded shoulder straps. Modular lightweight load-carrying equipment (MOLLE) webbing is located on the front and back pieces, and also the cummerbund/side plate pouch for mounting a variety of pouches and equipment. A quick release cable is located on the front of the collar for rapidly doffing the vest in an emergency. Initially the SPCS was issued in the Universal Camouflage Pattern, which was later replaced with MultiCam. A medium SPCS with ESAPI and ESBI plates weighs about 22 pounds.

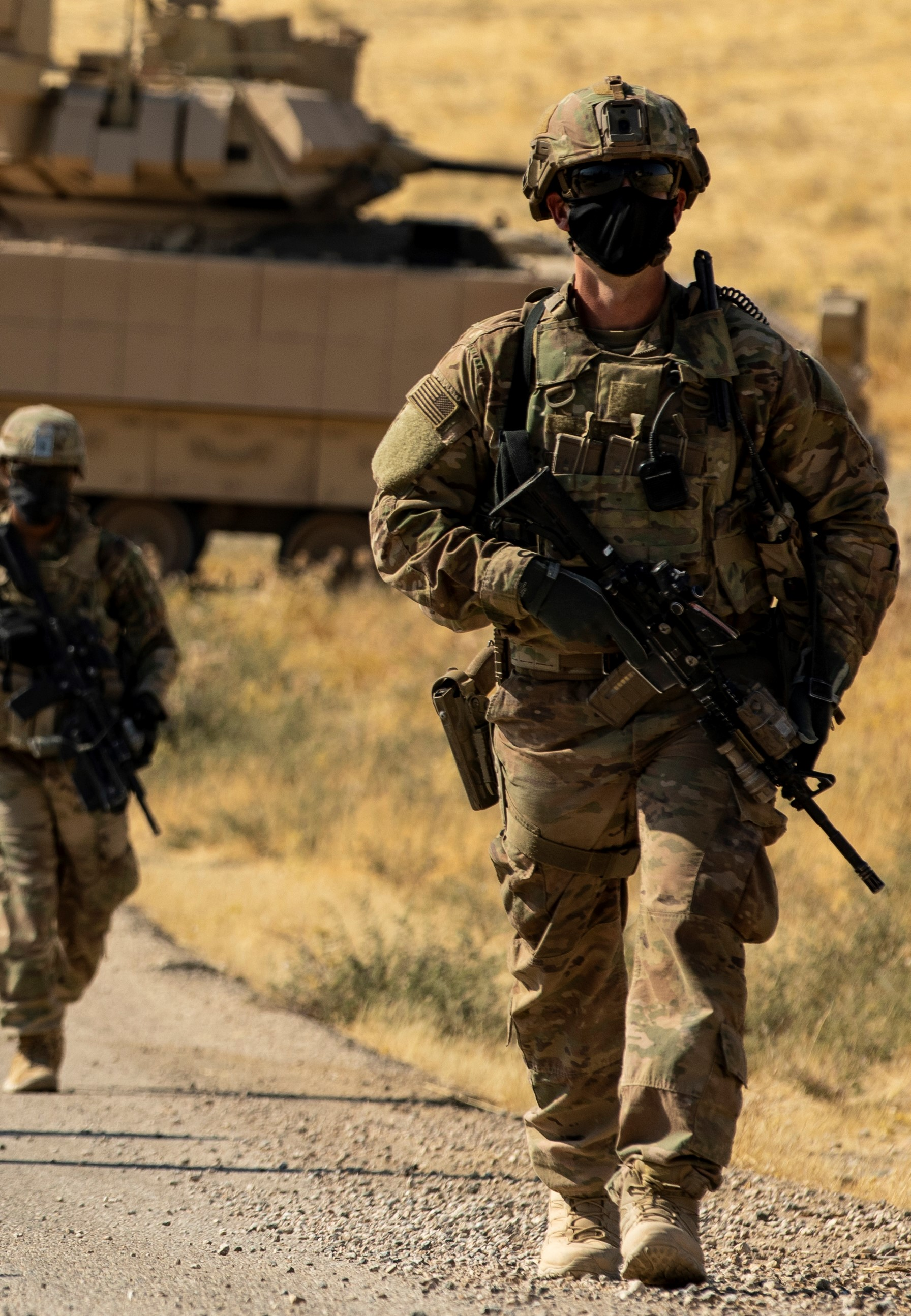
A U.S. Army soldier wearing the Gen II model Soldier Plate Carrier System in Syria.

An improved version of the SPCS known as the Generation II features a completely new quick release system based on that of the Generation III IOTV, which uses 4 buckles (2 for the shoulder straps, and 2 to connect each cummerbund to the front carrier) connected to the quick release handle with a steel cable. This results in quicker doffing, easier reassembly and more options for taking the plate carrier on and off. It also comes standard with a cummerbund that supports mounting side plates and is easier to adjust than prior models.

== Users ==
- Ukraine
- United States
