= PALS =

Pals is a town in Catalonia, Spain.

Pals may refer to:

- Pals (1925 film), an American western film by John P. McCarthy
- Pals (1933 film), an American animated short film

PALS may also refer to:

- Pakistan Life Saving Foundation
- Patient Advice and Liaison Service, in the UK's National Health Service
- Pediatric advanced life support
- Periarteriolar lymphoid sheaths
- Portraits of American Life Study
- Positron annihilation lifetime spectroscopy
- Pouch Attachment Ladder System
- Prague Asterix Laser System
- Public Access Legal Support
- Precision Approach and Landing System

== See also ==
- Pal's, regional U.S. restaurant
- PAL (disambiguation)
