= List of United States Marine Corps individual equipment =

This is a list of individual combat equipment issued by the United States Marine Corps. This list does not include items that are issued as uniforms or weapons and ordnance.

Many items on this list have nicknames. See list of United States Marine Corps acronyms and expressions.

== Defensive ==
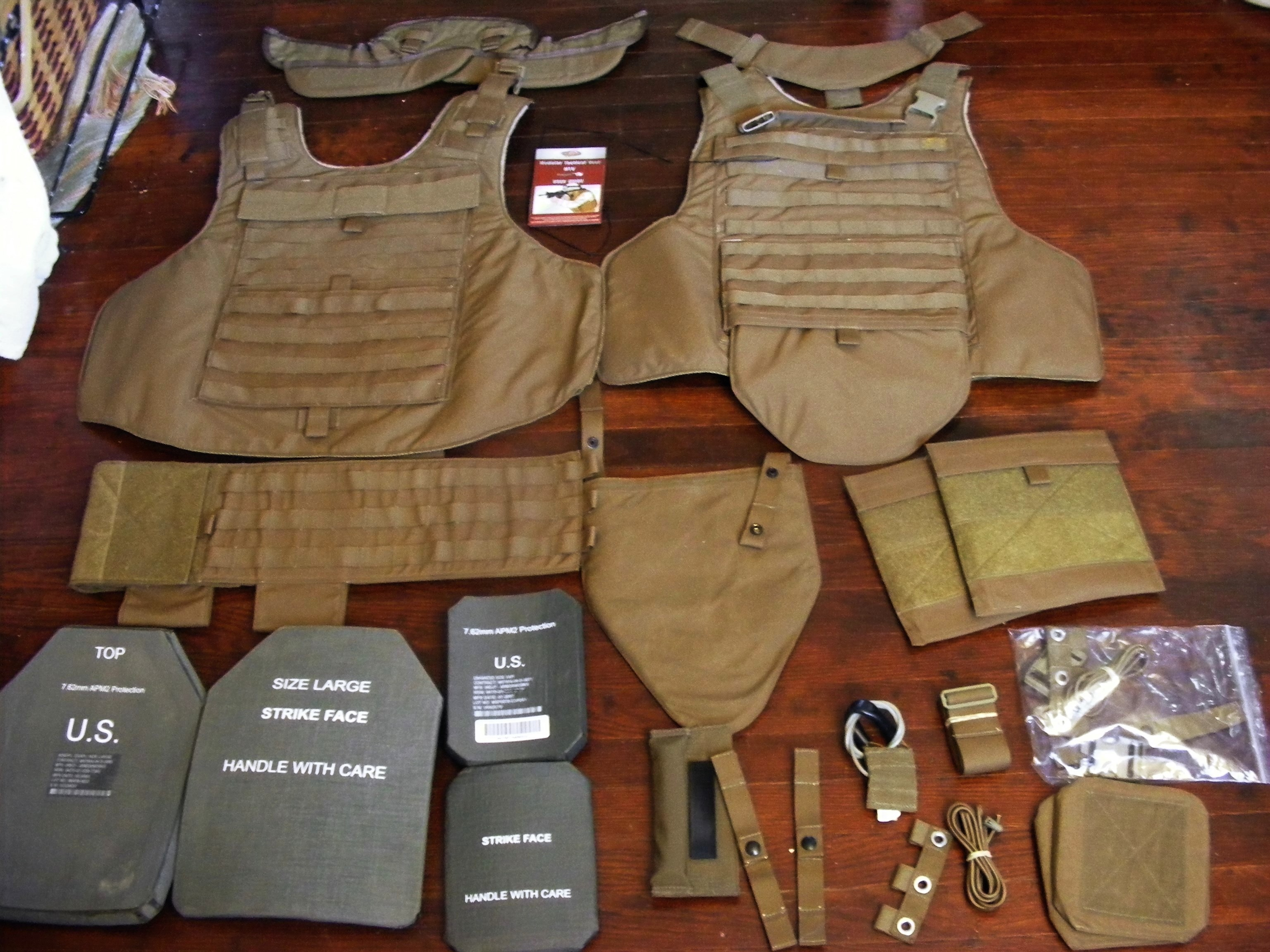
Components of a Modular Tactical Vest, including E-SAPI plates

Ballistic vests

- The Improved Modular Tactical Vest (IMTV) is the newest and most advanced vest in Marine inventories, with better protection and mobility than previous vests and a quick-release.
- The Improved Scalable Plate Carrier was developed for troops in Afghanistan because of concerns of excessive weight limiting mobility, especially in mountainous terrain.
- The Personnel Armor System for Ground Troops (PASGT) vest remains in some limited use in training and non-deployable units.
- The Full Spectrum Battle Equipment kit includes a quick-release ballistic vest, integrated breathing and flotation devices, as well as load bearing equipment.
- The Combat Integrated Releasable Armor System (CIRAS) has replaced the FSBE AAV for some units.
- The PRU-70 for aviators and aircrew combines body armor, survival vest, and flotation device.

Combat helmets

- The Enhanced Combat Helmet (ECH) is a made of high-strength polyethylene with superior ballistic protection compared to previous Kevlar helmets. The ECH is being issued to all units. Previous helmets like the LWH are being retained for training and noncombat use.
- The Lightweight Helmet (LWH) can be used with the older sling suspension or a newer pad suspension to fit the helmet to the head, as well as a nape protection system to add ballistic protection to the rear of the head.
- The MICH TC-2000 Combat Helmet is issued to some specialized units.
- The Enhanced Combat Vehicle Crewman's Helmet (ECVCH) allows the crew of AAV and LAV vehicles to communicate with less restriction on mobility and situational awareness without reducing ballistic protection.
- Most pilots and aircrew wear a flight helmet for protection from aviation-related hazards (such as an integrated oxygen mask), but typically offers little ballistic protection.
- The Pith helmet is worn not for ballistic protection, but to identify weapons range coaches and other range personnel.
- The Integrated Helmet System (IHS) is a new hi-cut system being introduced to infantry units. The helmet was designed to support single-size components (NVG shroud, rails, harness, accessory straps) for ease of maintenance and supply logistics, with a clear upgrade and support path through its service life. The system is typically used in tandem with a Hearing Enhancement Device produced by 3M.

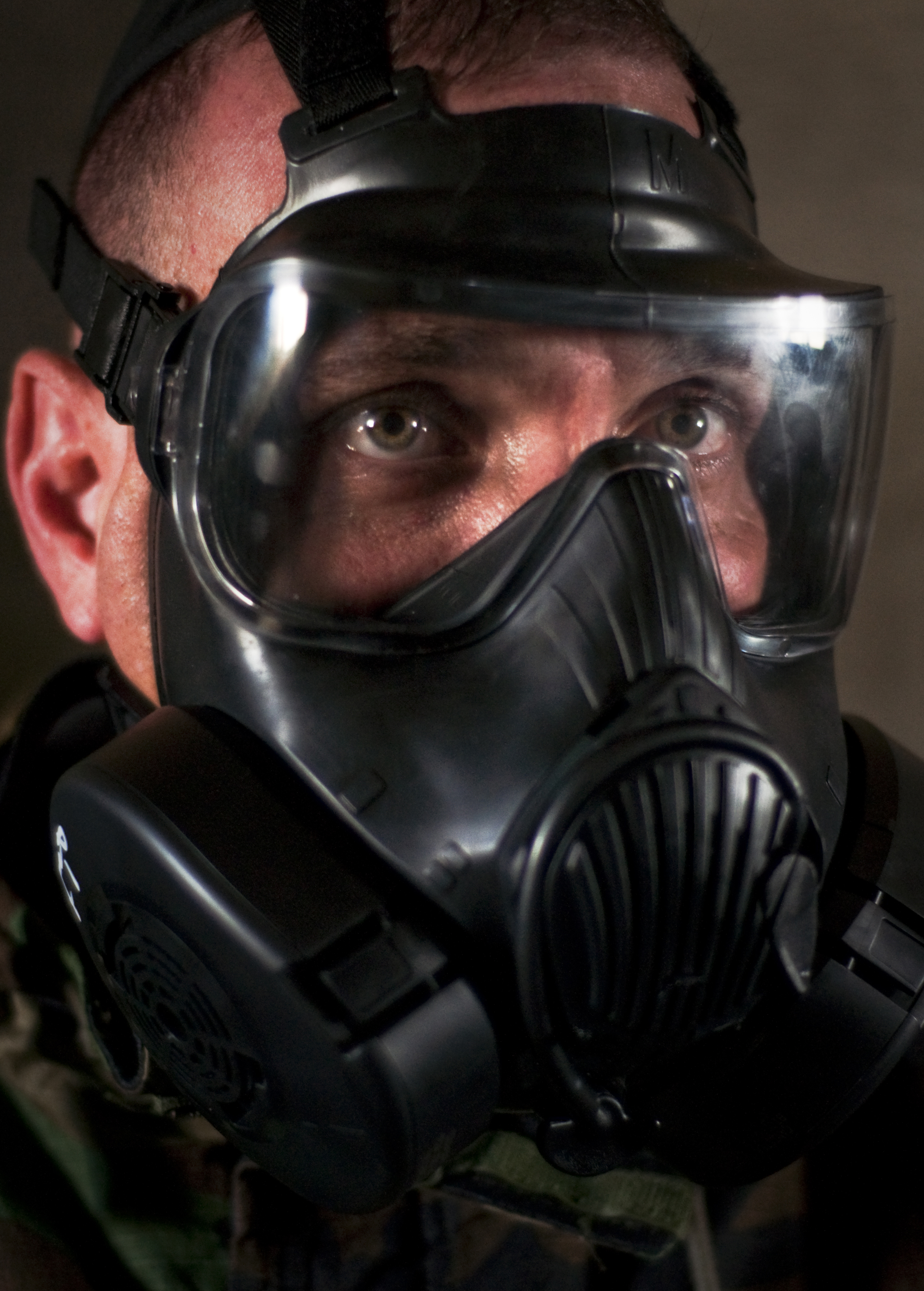
Marine wears an M50 mask

Other armor

- Small Arms Protective Inserts (SAPI) are used with the MTV and OTV to provide protection beyond what the vest itself offers. SAPI are also available in side plates to protect the torso.
- The OTV can be adapted with the Armor Protective Enhancement System (APES) that adds ballistic protection to the shoulder, armpit, and upper arm.
- The Advanced Bomb Suit is used by Explosive Ordnance Disposal.
- The Sea Dragon 2025 is an experimental battledress being tested for the US Marine Corps as a replacement for the Marine Corps Combat Utility Uniform

Chemical, biological, radiological, and nuclear defense

- The M50 joint service general purpose mask is the standard gas mask.
- Mission Oriented Protective Posture (MOPP) is a nuclear, biological, chemical suit with overalls, a hooded jacket, gloves, and overboots to protect against direct contact with contaminants.
- The Mk I Nerve Agent Antidote Kit (NAAK) consists of a pair of autoinjectors containing atropine sulfate and pralidoxime chloride for first aid against nerve agents, and are due to be replaced by the single ATNAA.

== Load-bearing & packs ==
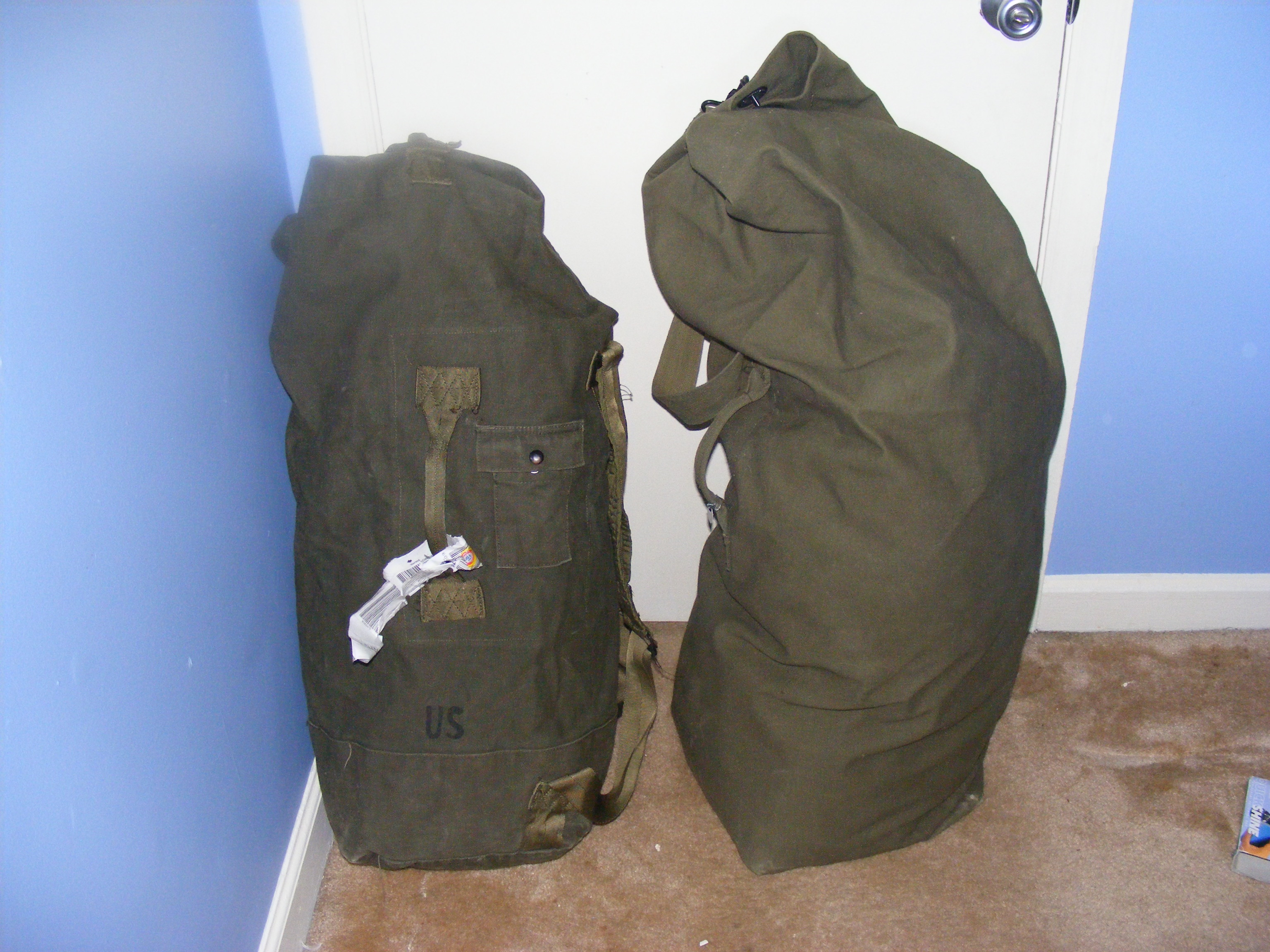
Seabags

- The Family of Improved Load Bearing Equipment (FILBE) is the latest load bearing equipment to be issued to Marines. It replaced the previous ILBE because of incompatibility with body armour systems. The FILBE system is a solid coyote brown color. It is a modular system that allows its users to configure the system to individual/mission need. It consists of a larger framed rucksack, labeled "USMC MAIN PACK," a smaller assault-style pack, labeled "USMC ASSAULT PACK," and a three-liter CamelBak hydration carrier.
- The standard canvas or nylon seabag, a militarized duffel bag, has been issued to service members of all branches since before World War II. However, the increase in equipment issued to an individual Marine has made containing and transporting it all in a standard seabag difficult (a phenomenon nicknamed seabag drag), in addition to a tactical load-bearing pack. The deployment bag holds the same cubic footage, but rugged wheels allow it to roll much like a ruggedized version of commercial rolling luggage.
- A rubberized waterproofing bag liner has been provided to Marines for decades as a way to protect the contents of a tactical pack from water. Newer versions (known as the "stuff sack") have a purge valve to expel excess air to compress the sack.
- The gunslinger pack allows a scout sniper to conceal and protect his sniper rifle within the pack while on the move.

== Clothing ==
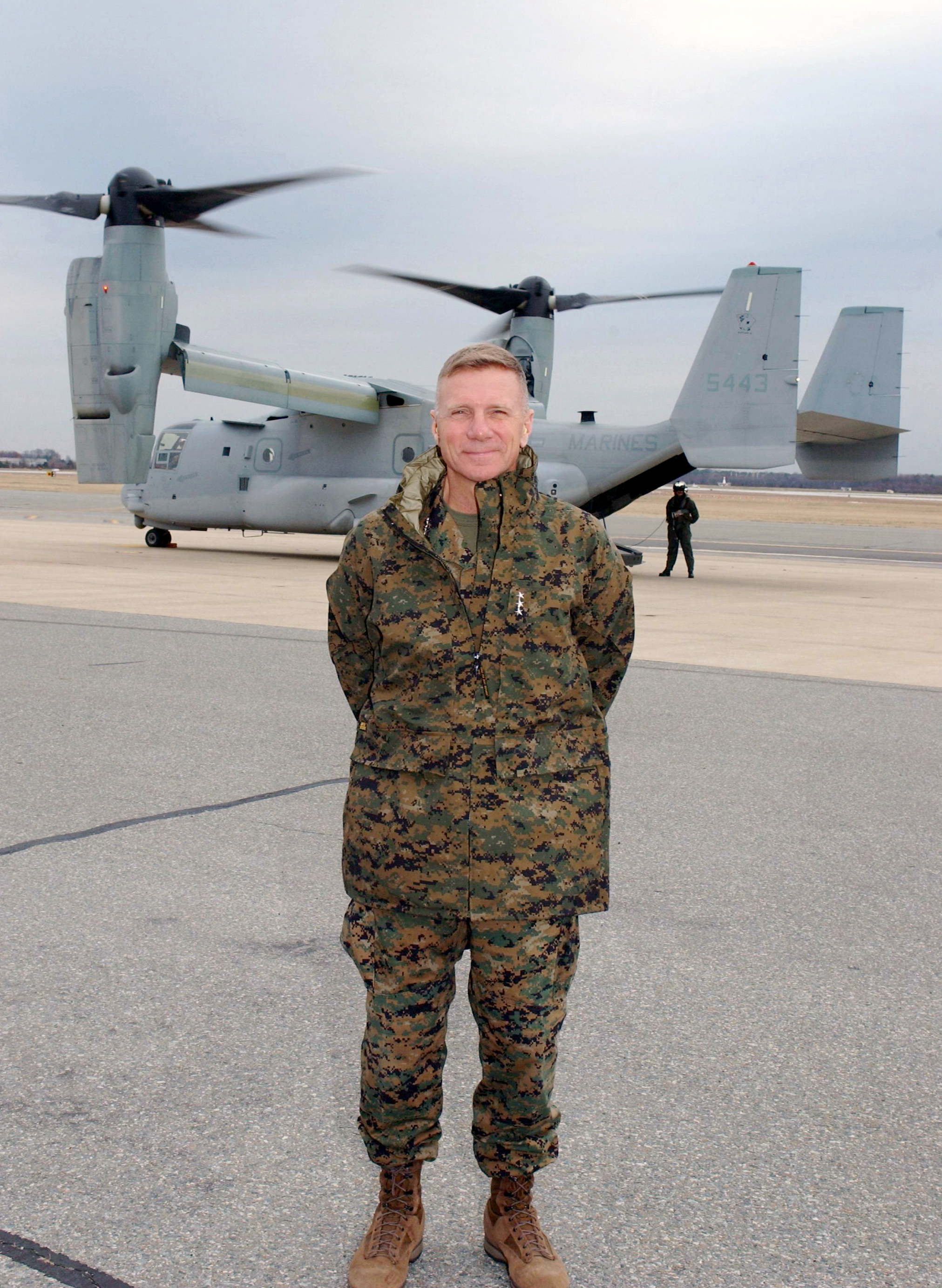
Commandant Hagee wearing an APECS parka in woodland MARPAT

Cold weather clothing

- All Purpose Environmental Clothing System (APECS): Rather than issue the 3rd generation Extended Cold Weather Clothing System (ECWCS), the Marine Corps issues the APECS, consisting of a MARPAT parka and pant. The APECS is structurally almost identical to ECWCS shell jacket and trousers.
- The Lightweight Exposure Suit offers similar capabilities.
- The Combat Desert Jacket is a lighter suit to protect Marines from the harsh desert climate.
- The Extreme Cold Weather Parka & Trouser offer heavy protection from cold weather, and include overboots.
- The Snow Camouflage Uniform is a winter MARPAT overgarment to camouflage Marines and their equipment in snow.
- Polypropylene undershirt and underdrawer, nicknamed "polypro" and officially known as "silkweight", is a mock turtleneck and trousers designed to be worn next to skin, and designed by Polartec. Flame-resistant versions are available.
- The Grid Fleece Midweight underwear includes a pullover and pants (in green and coyote brown). While the pullover is commonly issued as a warming layer in most locations, the pants are traditionally not issued unless the recipient is expected to face a cold weather environment. Flame-resistant versions are available.
- A cap made from microfleece is given to Marines in most environments.
- Cold weather socks and scarfs are also offered to Marines going to cold weather environments.
- Mountain/Cold Weather Boots, later renamed Rugged All Terrain (RAT) Boots, and Extreme Cold Vapor Barrier Boots are given. The overboots are insulated with an air barrier, and include a valve to allow paratroopers to jump with them, while the RAT Boot is reinforced with chemically impregnated leather for durability and stability.

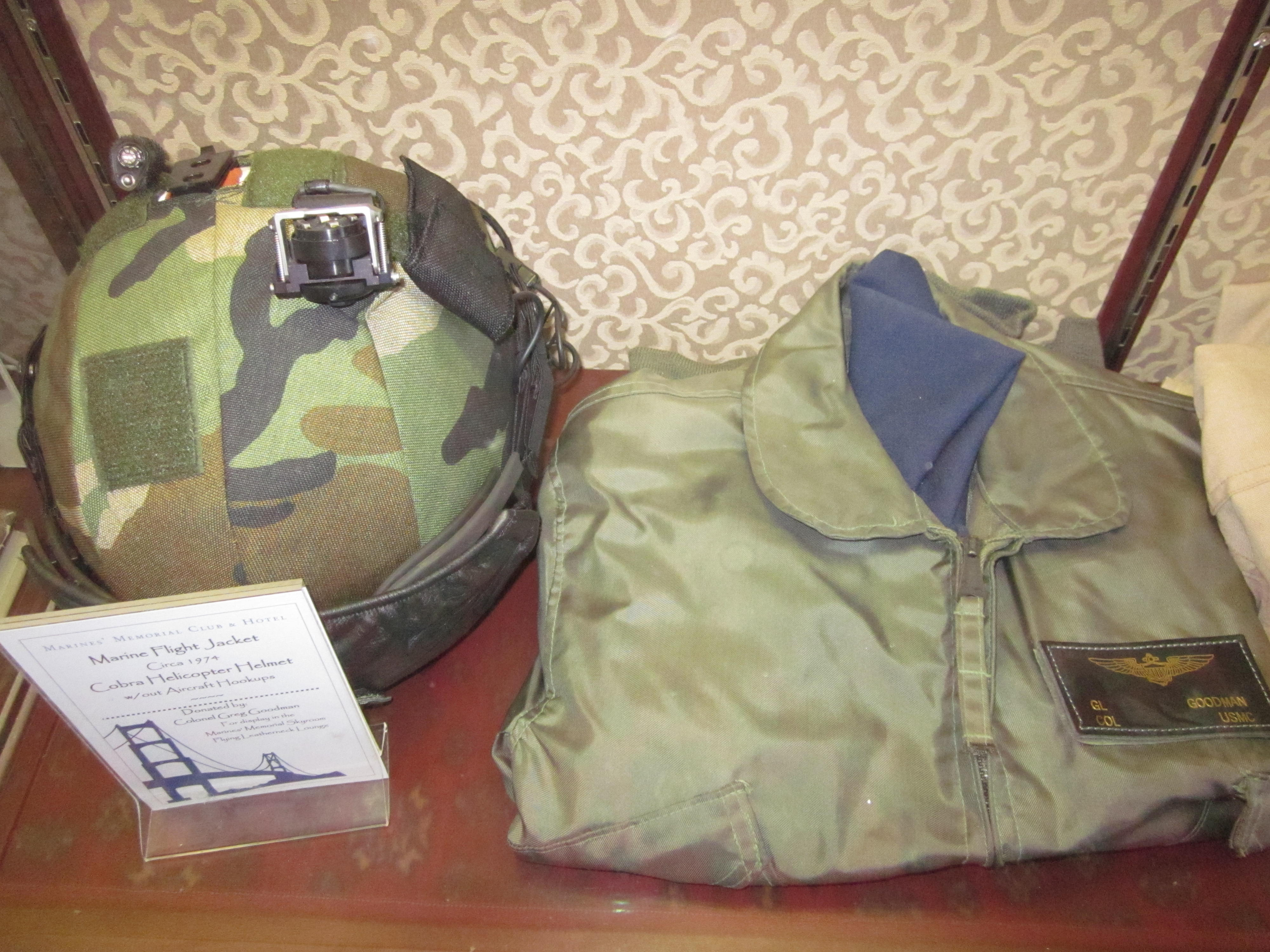
1974-vintage flight helmet and jacket

Other

- The Flame Resistant Organizational Gear (FROG) is a fire and heat protection system designed to help protect Marines from burn injuries associated with roadside bombs.
- Units with firefighting capabilities (Marine Wing Support Squadrons and Headquarters and Headquarters Squadrons ) are issued firefighting suits and self-contained breathing apparatus.
- Coveralls or jumpsuits are issued to vehicle crew, mechanics, and other Marines whose duties may render other uniforms unserviceable. They can have varying degrees of fire protection, and come in green and coyote brown to match the seasonal change of utilities from woodland to desert camouflage. Pilots and aircrew typically wear flight suits and flight jackets, as well as g-suit, pressure suits, and life vests as needed.
- Various gloves are offered by the Corps. Often, most Marines receive simply a woolen liner and leather shell, however, those who require more specialized gloves are issued them (cold weather, hazmat, Mechanix brand, etc.).
- The Marine Corps Combat Utility Uniform has built-in slots for knee and elbow pads, but many Marines prefer to purchase their own pads. The Commandant has authorized units to purchase knee and elbow pads for uniformity.
- The Corps is also contracting to receive protective silk underwear in use by the British Army. While not designed for ballistic protection, the so-called "blast boxers" do provide wound mitigation to groin injuries.

== Other ==
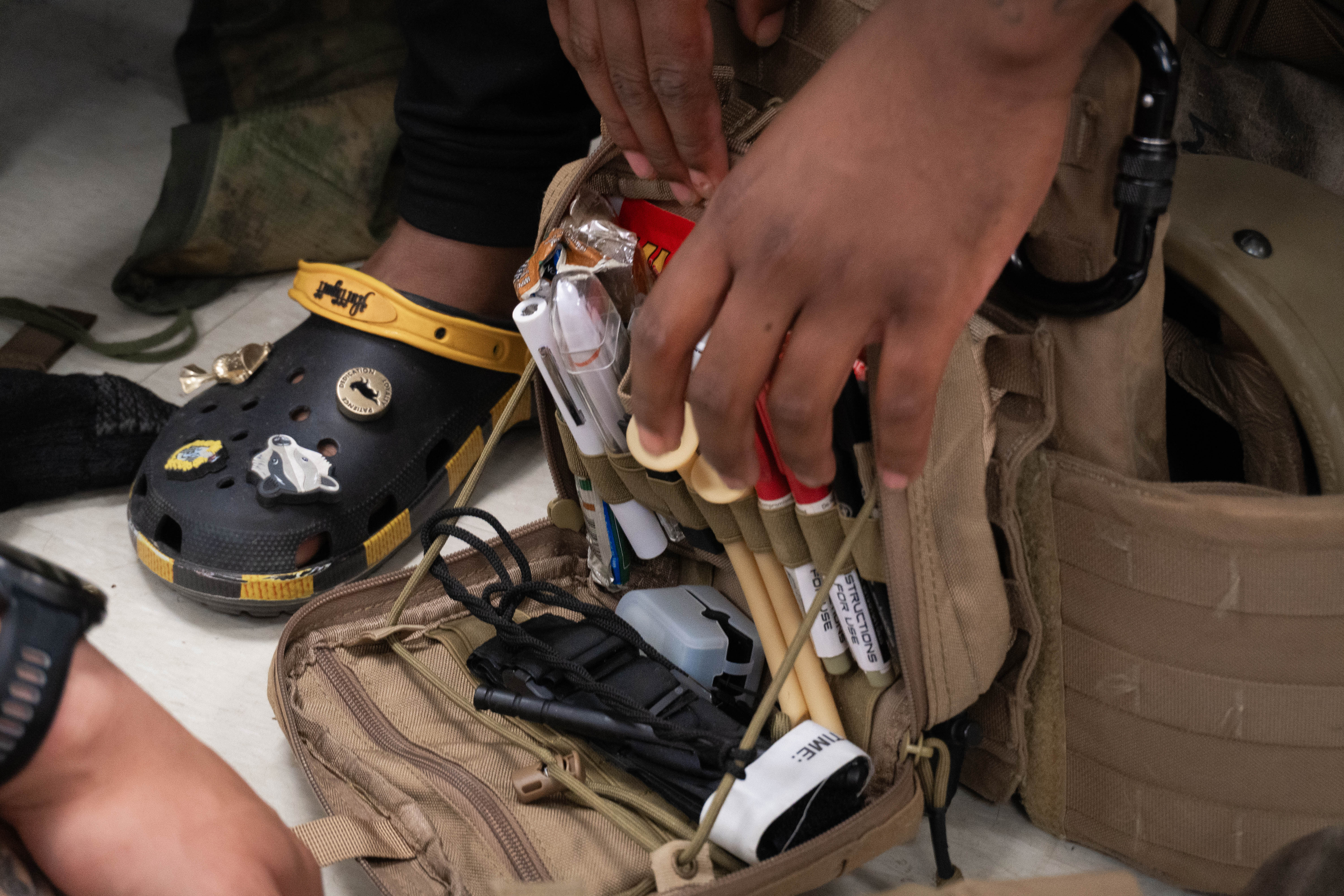
an IFAK being packed by a corpsman

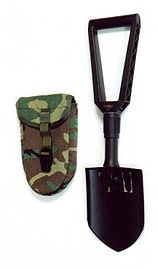
Entrenching tool

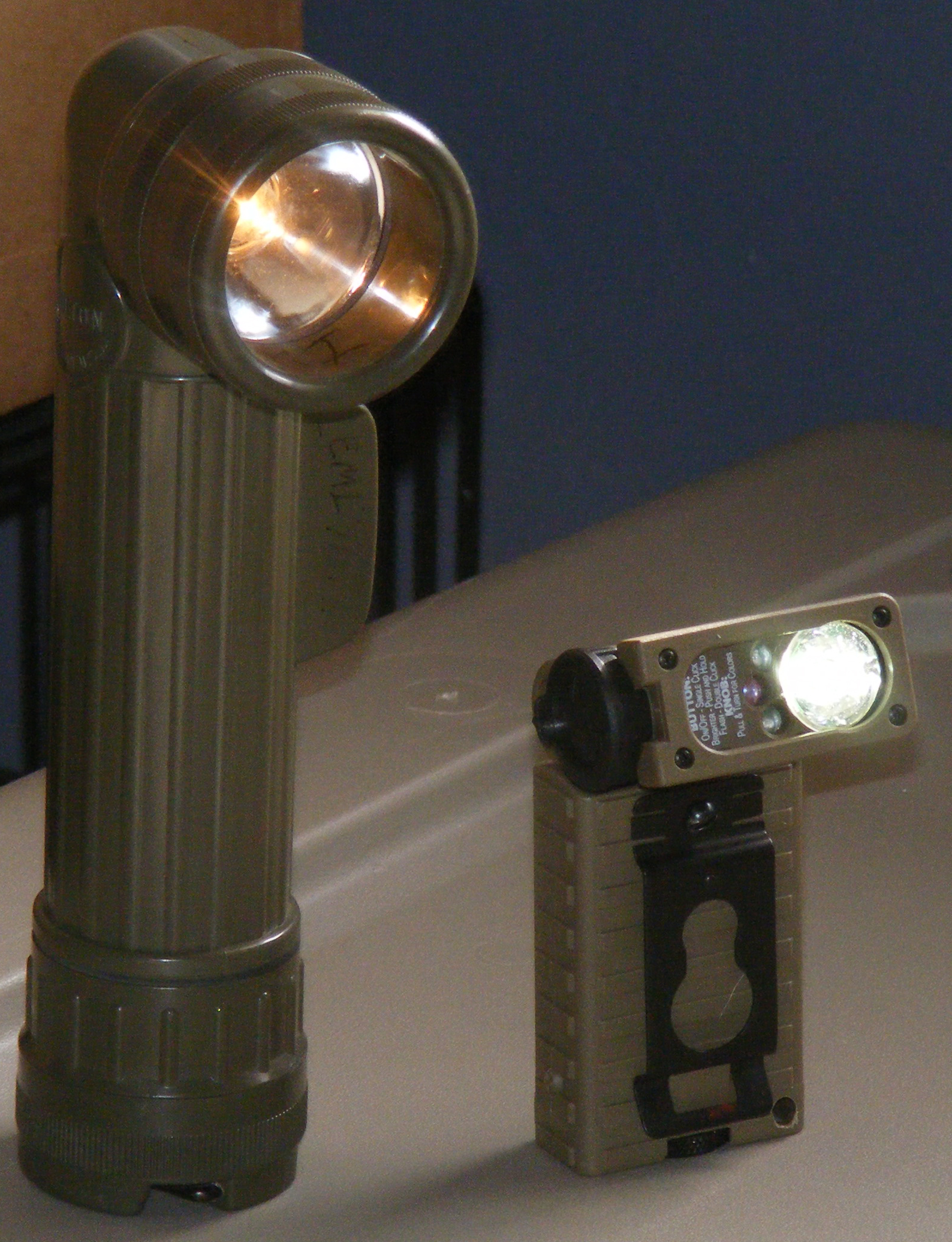
Old (left) and new flashlights

- The Individual First Aid Kit (IFAK) is used for immediate battlefield treatment. It includes several bandages, a tourniquet, burn ointment, some water purification tablets, and QuikClot combat gauze, a kaolin-infused gauze tamponade.
- Individual Water Purification System allows Marines to purify water to potable standards. These can be compatible with the standard issue hydration pack, similar to CamelBak brand packs. Plastic 1-quart canteens are issued as well, with a metal canteen cup and stand.
- Several types of eye protection are offered, including ballistic goggles and sunglasses made by Eye Safety Systems, Inc. and Wiley X, and are available with prescription lens inserts.
- Ballistic Hearing Protection is a two-sided earplug that offers Marines protection from audio damage.
- The entrenching tool or "E-tool" is standard issue to all Marines to prepare defensive fighting positions.
- All Marines usually receive a foam sleeping mat, a Modular Sleep System (with light, heavy, or waterproof sleeping bag to allow the user to adapt to ambient conditions and a compression sack to hold them), and a tarpaulin or waterproof poncho and liner that doubles as an expedient blanket.
- The Sidewinder HandHeld FlashLight (HHFL) is lightweight with a head adjustable over 185° of movement, light-emitting diodes providing five intensities each of white, red, blue, and infrared light (including a strobe function), helmet mount, and runs on AA batteries. Aside from providing illumination, the flashlight can be used for signalling and detecting blood residue.
- There is no standard tactical light. Many Marines choose to purchase their own.
- The Martial Arts Kit (MAK) allows units to train Marines in the Marine Corps Martial Arts Program. It contains all of the pads, gloves, props, and other safety aids that allow an instructor to successfully teach the program.
- The Mechanical Breacher's Kit (MBK) allows an assault breacher to breach a door or other obstacle.
- Various mountain-warfare items have been fielded, including snowshoes, skis, climbing kits, and Portable/camping stoves.
- Numerous parachutes are used, such as the static line T-10 and T-11, Military Free Fall Parachute System, and various aviation-specific models used for aircrew survival.
- Many Marines are also issued K-Bar style fighting knives, often made by companies other than K-Bar, such as Camillus and Ontario.

== Historical items ==
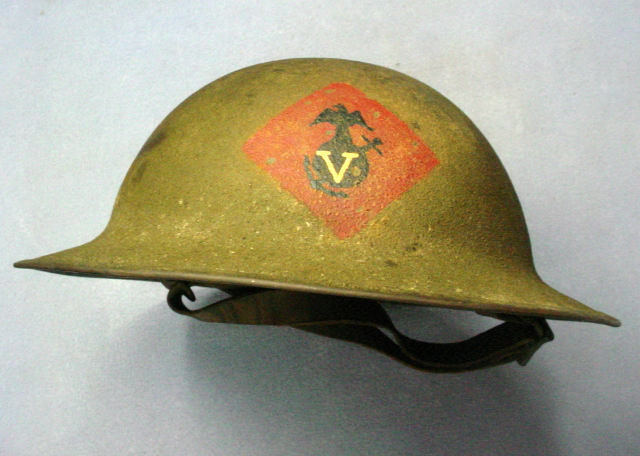
Brodie helmet worn in World War I

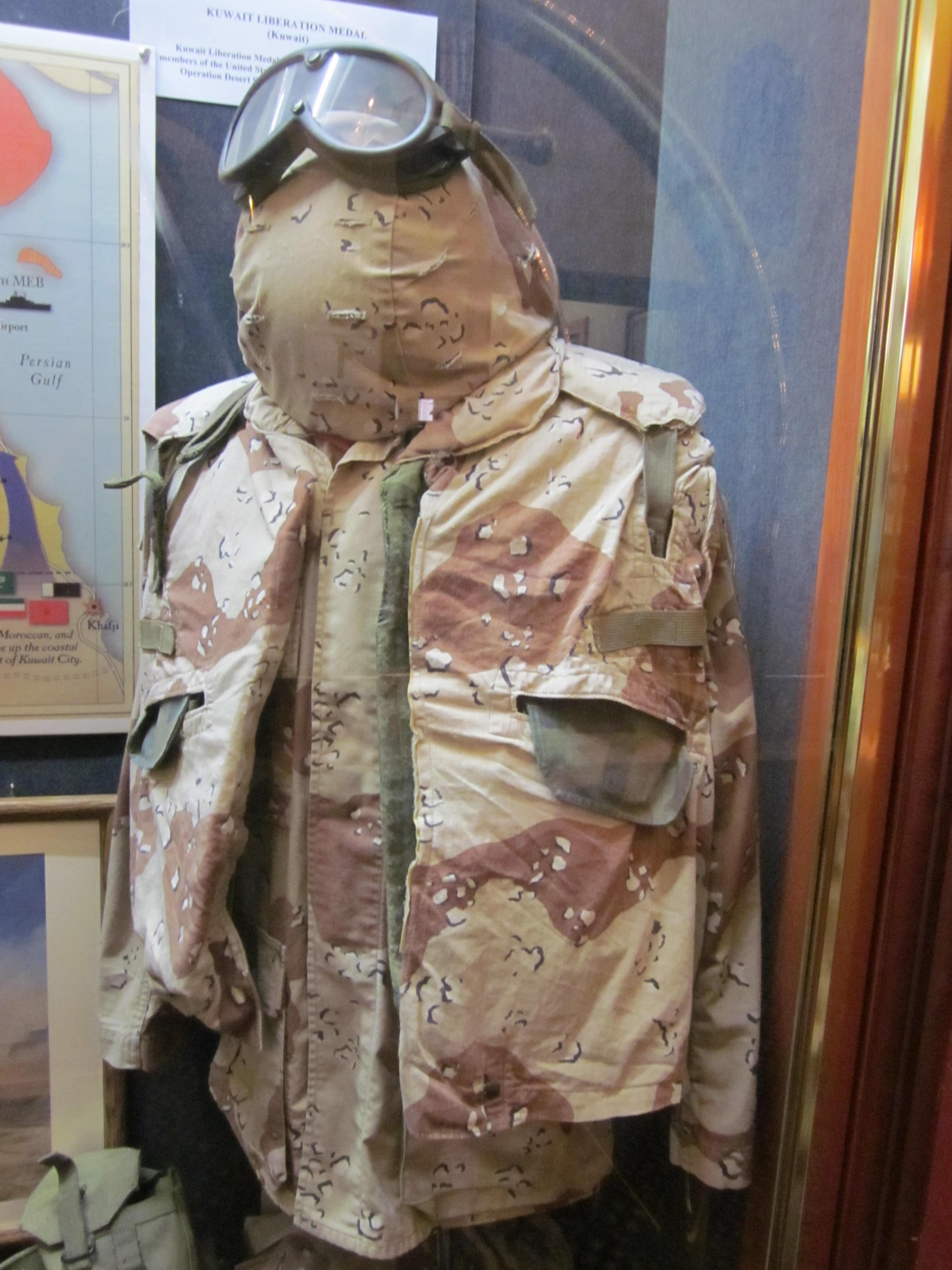
Gulf War–era armor

The following items are obsolete and no longer issued:

Armor

- Flak jacket
- Doron Plate
- M1 Helmet
- M1917 Helmet "Brodie" helmet

Load-bearing equipment

- MOLLE
- M-1956 load-carrying equipment
- Modernized load-carrying equipment
- Various types of haversacks were issued in World War I

Other

- M-1965 field jacket
- M-1951 field jacket
- M-1941 field jacket
- P42 jacket
- P-38 can opener
- Mess kit
