= Barristers in England and Wales =

One of the three main categories of lawyer in England and Wales

Barristers in England and Wales are one of the two main categories of lawyer in England and Wales, the other being solicitors.

Barristers have traditionally had the role of handling cases for representation in court, both defence and prosecution; and of providing specialist legal advice and opinions. They are highly-trained legal advisers and courtroom advocates and appear in court when instructed by a solicitor. Barristers are a regulated profession, and strict rules are in place about what a barrister must do for the court, their client and how they must behave.

The word lawyer is a generic term, encompassing the professions of both barrister and solicitor. It can also be used to refer to a person who has studied law and in some form, practises the law; so could also be deemed to include other legal practitioners such as chartered legal executives, legal-research consultants, and licensed conveyancers.

== Origin of the profession ==
The work of senior legal professionals in England and Wales is divided between solicitors and barristers. Both are trained in law but serve differing functions in the practice of law.

Historically, the superior courts were based in London, the capital city. To dispense justice throughout the country, a judge and court personnel would periodically travel a regional circuit to deal with cases that had arisen there. From this developed a body of lawyers who were socially familiar with the judges, had training and experience in the superior courts, and had access to a greater corpus of research material and accumulated knowledge on the interpretation and application of the law. Some would go "on circuit" with the court to act on behalf of those requiring representation. By contrast, solicitors were essentially local to one place, whether London or a provincial town.

Lawyers who practised in the courts in this way came to be called "barristers" because they were "called to the Bar", the symbolic barrier separating the public—including solicitors and law students—from those admitted to the well of the Court. They became specialists either in court to represent clients, or in giving oral or written advice on the strength of a case and the best way to conduct it. For those who had the means and preference to engage a solicitor, it became useful, then normal and then compulsory, for the solicitor, in turn, to select and engage a barrister to represent the client before the courts. Likewise, it became either useful or normal (but not compulsory) to engage an appropriate barrister when highly specialist advice was required. Many barristers have largely "paper practices" and rarely or never appear in court.

Historically, practising at the bar (or in court) was a more socially prestigious profession than working as a solicitor. In the 18th and 19th centuries, the bar was one of the limited number of professions considered suitable for upper-class men; politics, the Army and Navy, the established clergy, banking and the civil and diplomatic services being the others. Many leading 18th- and 19th-century politicians were barristers; few were solicitors. In the 20th century, solicitors narrowed the gap greatly, especially in terms of earnings, and by the early 21st century the social gap was far less important.

== Key differences from the profession of solicitor ==
Until recently, the most obvious differences between the two professions were:

1. Only barristers had exclusive and wide rights of audience (that is, a right to plead) in all courts in England and Wales;
2. Only solicitors could be directly engaged by clients for payment.

These differences have been eroded by recent deliberate changes, although in many fields of legal practice, the distinction is largely retained.

Barristers have full rights of audience to appear in all courts, from highest to lowest. Solicitors, on the other hand, have traditionally been able to appear only as advocates in the lower courts (that is, the magistrates' and county courts) and tribunals. The bulk of such work continues to be handled by solicitors. Under section 17 of the Courts and Legal Services Act 1990, solicitors with appropriate advocacy experience are entitled to acquire higher "rights of audience", enabling them to appear in the superior courts. Solicitors who attain these rights are known as solicitor-advocates. But, in practice, there are rather few of these solicitor-advocates, and solicitors often continue to engage a barrister to undertake any required advocacy in court. Not only is this division traditional; in higher-value civil or more serious criminal cases, it is often tactically imperative to engage a specialist advocate (because if one side does not the other might).

Until 2004, barristers were prohibited from seeking or accepting "instructions" (that is, being hired) directly by the clients whom they represent. The involvement of a solicitor was compulsory. The rationale was that solicitors could investigate and gather evidence and instructions and filter them – according to the interests of the client – before presenting them to the barrister; in return the barrister, being one step removed from the client, could reach a more objective opinion of the merits of the case, working strictly from the evidence that would be admissible in court. In addition, being less involved in the current affairs of clients, including many matters that might never come to court, barristers had more time for research and for keeping up to date with the law and the decisions (precedent) of the courts.

Theoretically, this prohibition has been removed. In certain areas (but not crime or conveyancing), barristers may now accept instructions from a client directly ("Direct Access"). However, barristers must have additional authorisation to conduct litigation for the client. Furthermore, only a solicitor may undertake any work that requires funds to be held on behalf of a client; barristers are not permitted to handle client money under rC73 of the BSB Handbook.

A barrister is in principle required to act for any client offering a proper fee, regardless of the attractions or disadvantages of a case and the personal feelings of the barrister towards the client. This is known as the "cab-rank rule", since the same rule applies to licensed taxi-cabs. Modifying conditions include that the barrister is available to take the case and feels competent to handle the work (rC30 of the BSB Handbook). A barrister who specialises in, for example, crime is not obliged to take on employment law work if they are offered it. They are entitled (and even obliged) to reject a case which they feel is too complicated for them to deal with properly.

== Manner of work ==
Barristers work in two main contexts: in self-employed practice (formerly known as "independent practice") or in "employed" practice (i.e. salaried).

Most barristers are in self-employed practice, but operate within the framework of a chambers, an unincorporated association whose members are barristers. Under a tenancy agreement, they pay a certain amount per month ("rent") or a percentage of their incomes, or a mixture of the two, to their chambers, which provides accommodation and clerical support (including the crucial function of booking, and sometimes of finding, work). The Head of Chambers, usually a King's Counsel (also referred to as "KC" or "Silk") or a "senior junior", may exercise a powerful influence on the members, and members often offer informal help and guidance to each other. They are not liable for each other's business (as partners are). Members of the same chambers may appear on opposite sides in the same case. Each barrister remains a self-employed practitioner, being solely responsible for the conduct of their own practice and keeping what they earn, other than rent. They do not receive a salary from anyone. A barrister in self-employed practice will be instructed by a number of different solicitors ("professional clients") to act for various individuals, government departments, agencies or companies ("lay clients").

By contrast, an "employed" barrister is a barrister who works as an employee within a larger organisation, either in the public, private or third sector. For example, employed barristers work within government departments or agencies (such as the Crown Prosecution Service), the legal departments of companies and charities, and in some cases for firms of solicitors. Employed barristers will typically be paid a salary, and in most circumstances may do work only on behalf of their employer, rather than accepting instructions on behalf of third parties (such as their employers' customers). They remain subject to the Bar Council's Code of Professional Conduct, and their advice is entitled to professional privilege against disclosure.

New entrants to the employed bar must have completed pupillage in the same way as those in self-employed practice. Pupillage for both employed and self-employed practice is regulated by the independent Bar Standards Board.

There are approximately 17,000 barristers, of whom about ten percent are King's Counsel and approximately twenty percent are young barristers (i.e., under seven years' call). In April 2023, there were 13,800 barristers in self-employed practice. In 2022, there were about 3,100 employed barristers working in companies or charities as "in-house" counsel, or in local or national government, academic institutions, or the armed forces.

=== Appearance and forms of address ===
The appearance and form of address of a barrister is bound by a number of conventions.

A barrister's appearance in court depends on whether the hearing is "robed" or not. In England and Wales, criminal cases in the Crown Court are almost invariably conducted with the barristers' wearing robes, but there is an increasing tendency in civil cases to dispense with them. The vast majority of County Court hearings are now conducted without robes, although the traditional attire continues to be worn in High Court proceedings.

At a robed hearing, barristers wear a horsehair wig, an open black gown, dark suit and a shirt, with strips of white cotton called "bands" or "tabs" worn over a winged collar, instead of a tie. Female barristers wear either the same shirt or a special collar which includes the bands and tucks inside a suit jacket. KCs wear slightly different silk gowns over short embroidered black jackets and striped trousers. Solicitors wear a black gown (of a distinct style), wing collar and band and a wig. The question of barristers' and judges' clothing in the civil courts was the subject of review, and there is some pressure to adopt a more "modern" style of dress, with European-style gowns worn over lounge suits. Guidance from the Bar Council has resulted in robes being worn for trials and appeals in the County Court more than formerly.

In court, barristers refer to each other as "my learned friend". When referring to an opponent who is a solicitor, the term used is "my friend" – irrespective of the relative ages and experiences of the two.

In an earlier generation, barristers would not shake hands or address each other formally. The rule against shaking hands is no longer generally observed, though the rule regarding formal address is still sometimes observed: at Gray's Inn, when toasting other barristers, a barrister will address another only by surname, without using a prefix such as "Miss".

== Organisations ==
Beginning in January 2006, standards for admission to the bar and disciplinary proceedings are administered by the Bar Standards Board (BSB), a regulatory board of the General Council of the Bar. The BSB is not legally separate from the General Council of the Bar, but is set up so as to be independent of it. Previously, barristers were governed by the General Council of the Bar and the individual Inns of Court. There are four Inns, all situated in the area of London close to the Law Courts in the Strand. Gray's Inn is off High Holborn, Lincoln's Inn off Chancery Lane, the Middle and Inner Temples, situated between Fleet Street and the Embankment.

The Inns provide a social and professional hub where barristers and jurists can meet. They comprise a grand hall where barristers dine and attend social functions, and include an extensive library. Several rooms are available for conferences and a place for trainee barristers to engage in advocacy practice. Two of the Inns have chapels, and Middle Temple and Inner Temple share Temple Church. All four Inns are set in well-tended gardens and are surrounded by chambers often organised in courtyards and squares.

England and Wales has traditionally been divided in a number of circuits for the purposes of administration of justice. Today, they exist as professional associations for barristers.

== Direct public access to barristers ==
Members of the public may engage the services of the barrister directly under the Public Access Scheme; a solicitor is not involved at any stage.

Barristers undertaking public access work can provide legal advice and representation in court in all areas of law and are entitled to represent clients in any court or tribunal in England and Wales. Once instructions from a client are accepted, it is the barrister (rather than the solicitor) who advises and guides the client through the relevant legal procedure or litigation.

Barristers must complete a special course before undertaking Public Access work. At present, about 1 in 20 barristers has so qualified. "Licensed Access" is a separate scheme available to certain nominated classes of professional client; it is not open to the general public.

It is an early 21st-century development to enable barristers to accept instructions directly from clients; it results from a change in the rules set down by the General Council of the Bar in July 2004. The Public Access Scheme has been introduced as part of a larger effort to open up the legal system to the public, and to make it easier and cheaper for individuals to obtain access to legal advice. It reduces the distinction between solicitors and barristers. The distinction remains, however, because a solicitor's role has certain aspects which a barrister is not able to undertake.

== Education and training ==
A prospective barrister must first complete the academic component of their legal education by obtaining a law degree. In lieu of a formal law degree, however, the individual may undertake a one-year law conversion course, formerly known as the CPE (Common Professional Examination) or PGDL (Postgraduate Diploma in Law), and now known simply as a GDL (Graduate Diploma in Law), having initially graduated in a subject other than law. The student joins one of the Inns of Court and takes the [vocational component] at one of the accredited providers.

Formerly known as the Bar Professional Training Course (BPTC), the vocational component can now be taken through four different routes:

- Three-step pathway – the academic component, followed by the vocational component, followed by the work-based learning component (pupillage)
- Four-step pathway – the academic component, followed by the vocational component in two parts, followed by the work-based learning component (pupillage).
- Integrated academic and vocational pathway – combined academic component and vocational component, followed by the work-based learning component (pupillage).
- Apprenticeship pathway – combined academic component, vocational component, and work-based learning component (pupillage).

It is still mandatory to "keep terms" before the student can be called to the bar. The student must participate in 10 qualifying sessions. It used to be a prerequisite that 24 dinners were eaten before call, but the number was reduced to twelve and now ten. Dining credits are available for participating in specified training events (e.g., a weekend at Cumberland Lodge organised by one of the Inns credits attendees with three dinners). It is also possible to "double-dine" on various special occasions, by which the student is credited with two sessions.

The origins of this date from the time when both students and practitioners dined together; students learned elements of their education from their fellow diners and from readings given by a senior member of the Inn (Master Reader) after the meal. At the successful completion of the vocational component (where continuous assessment, as well as examinations, are now the rule), and completion of the requisite number of dining nights, students are entitled, subject to various formalities, to be "called to the Bar" at a ceremony in their Inn. This is conducted by the Masters of the Bench, or Benchers, who are generally senior practising barristers or judges.

Once called to the bar, the new barrister has a choice whether or not to pursue a career in practice.

Those choosing not to practice continue to be recognised as "barristers", although may not provide legal services under this label, and remain subject to some limited regulation by the Bar Standards Board.

One who wishes to become a practising barrister must first obtain a "pupillage". This is a competitive process which involves some 3,000 students applying for some 300 places each year at Authorised Education and Training Organisations (AETOs). The online pupillage application system, the Pupillage Gateway, enables applicants to submit their details to AETOs (chambers or employers). The Pupillage Gateway system is used by most AETOs to recruit their pupils; many, however, do not, and such AETOs must be contacted directly by applicants. There is no limit to the number of non-Gateway AETOs that an applicant can contact. The application timetable runs between November and May each year, and AETOs must follow that timetable unless they have a waiver from the Bar Standards Board.

Pupillage consists of a period of 12 months, where the pupil studies with and under a practising barrister of at least 5 years' experience. The time is traditionally served in two six-month periods under different pupil supervisors (three-month periods are becoming increasingly common), usually in the same AETO. Traditionally, the pupil was paid nothing and could earn no fees until the second six-month period, when they were entitled to undertake work independently. All sets are now required to pay their pupils in line with the Living Wage (higher in London). Some pay considerably more than that. The Bar is a highly varied profession, both in terms of the specialism (or otherwise) of individual sets of chambers, and in the financial rewards available. For sets doing predominantly publicly funded work, earnings are low for new practitioners. In more specialised areas serving private clients, such as commercial, tax, or chancery work, earnings are far higher, and at least comparable to those of similarly experienced solicitors in big city firms.

After pupillage, the new barrister must find a seat or "tenancy" in a set of chambers or an employed position. Chambers are groups of barristers and tend to comprise between 20 and 60 barristers. The members of a Chambers share the rent and facilities, such as the service of "clerks" (who combine some of the functions of agents, administrators and diary managers), secretaries and other support staff. Most chambers operate a system whereby the members contribute to these common expenses by paying a certain percentage of their gross income. However, there is no profit-sharing as in a business partnership. Individual barristers keep the fees they earn, beyond what they have to pay towards professional expenses.

The Bar remains a highly individualistic profession, and earnings vary widely – from some newly qualified (usually criminal) juniors who are lucky to earn £25,000 per year, to well-paid General Counsels in employed positions, to the top King's Counsel (KCs or "silks" as they are known, from their silk gowns) making well in excess of £1 million a year (with a handful of tax and commercial KCs reported to earn more than £2 million a year).

Although not all barristers practise from the Inns (for reasons such as the limited amount of space available), the majority still practise from chambers. The names placed on boards at the entrances of many of the staircases of the buildings within the Inns are the names of the tenant barristers (and occasionally distinguished members now prominent in judicial or political life) practising from the chambers in those buildings.

== Popular culture ==
Some of the principles and traditions that have given the profession its unique character have been caricatured in John Mortimer's Rumpole of the Bailey television series and the novels and short stories based on it. Novelist Caro Fraser also wrote a popular series of books about a fictional series of barrister's chambers called Caper Court.

In television the bar was popularised by actor John Thaw's portrayal of the title character in Kavanagh QC. Peter Moffat (who created Kavanagh QC) also later created a further television series about barristers called Silk (in reference to the silk gowns of King's Counsel) and North Square.

== See also ==
- Serjeant-at-law
- King's Counsel Selection Panel
- 2022 British barristers' industrial action
