= Modular Tactical Vest =

Body armor developed by the United States Marine Corps

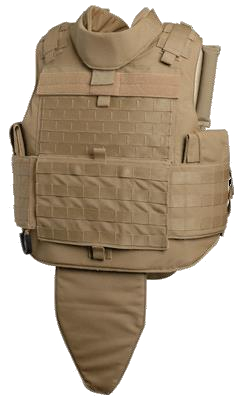
Modular Tactical Vest

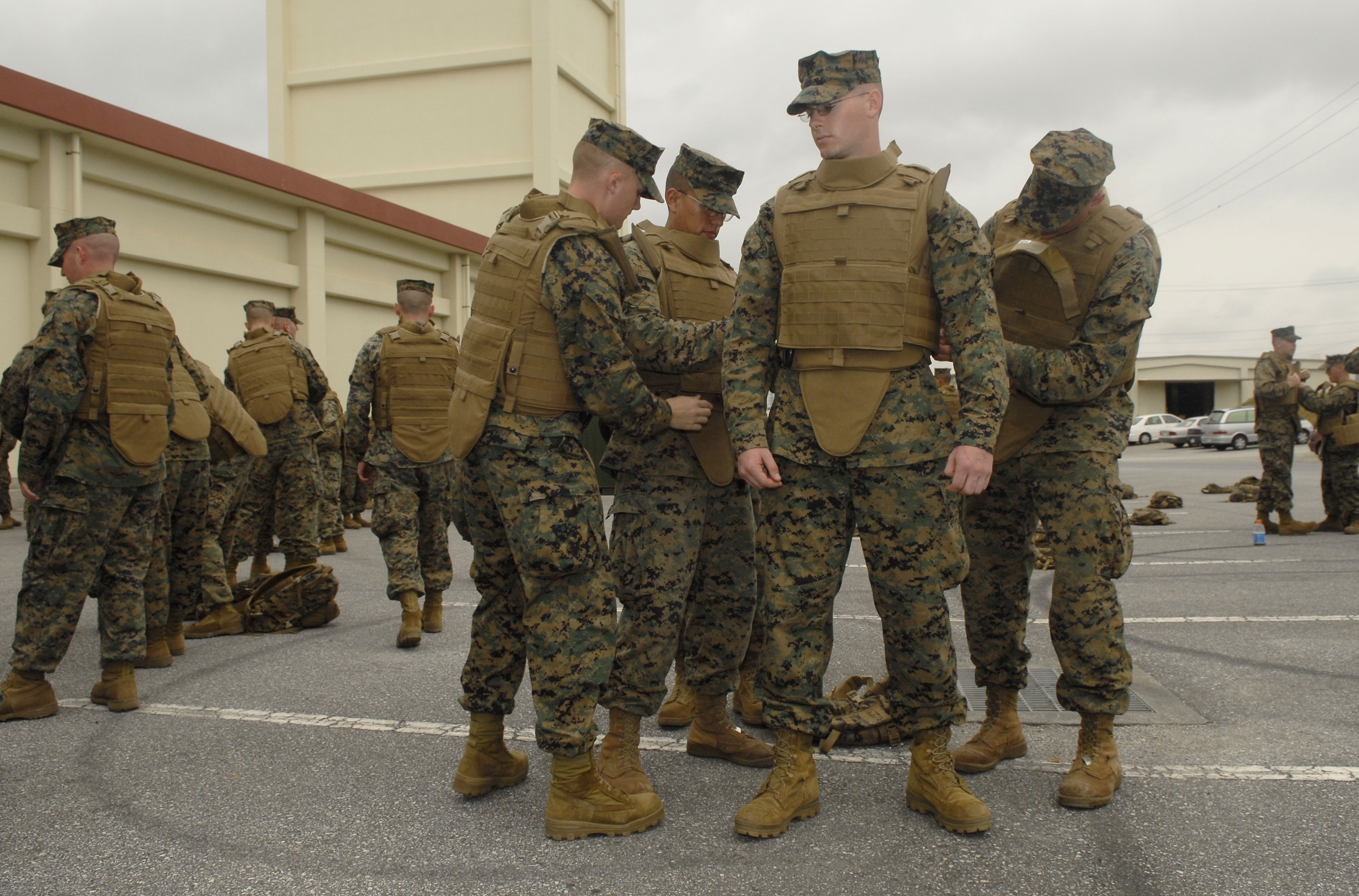
Marines being issued the MTV at Camp Foster, Okinawa

The Modular Tactical Vest (MTV or MoTaV) is a ballistic vest originally adopted by the United States Marine Corps in 2006. The MTV was designed as a solution to shortcomings in the Interceptor Body Armor (IBA) and was selected after a rigorous proposal and examination process by the Marine Corps. The MTV provides better protection levels than the IBA, although it uses the same Small Arms Protective Insert (SAPI) plates. The MTV weighs 30 pounds (14 kg), three pounds more than the IBA, but is designed to more effectively distribute its weight throughout the wearer's torso.

== History ==
The Marine Corps awarded a US$33,647,022 firm, fixed price contract to Protective Products International (subsidiary of Protective Products of America) in 2006 to produce 60,000 vests and began fielding them in 2007. In 2008, the Marine Corps awarded a followup indefinite delivery/indefinite quantity contract for an additional 28,364 MTVs. After conducting a survey of more than 1,000 Marines and finding that a majority of the Marine Corps had been overall highly satisfied with the MTV, in January 2009 the Marine Corps announced that it would be making some modifications to the MTV to improve comfort, mobility and safety.

== Design ==
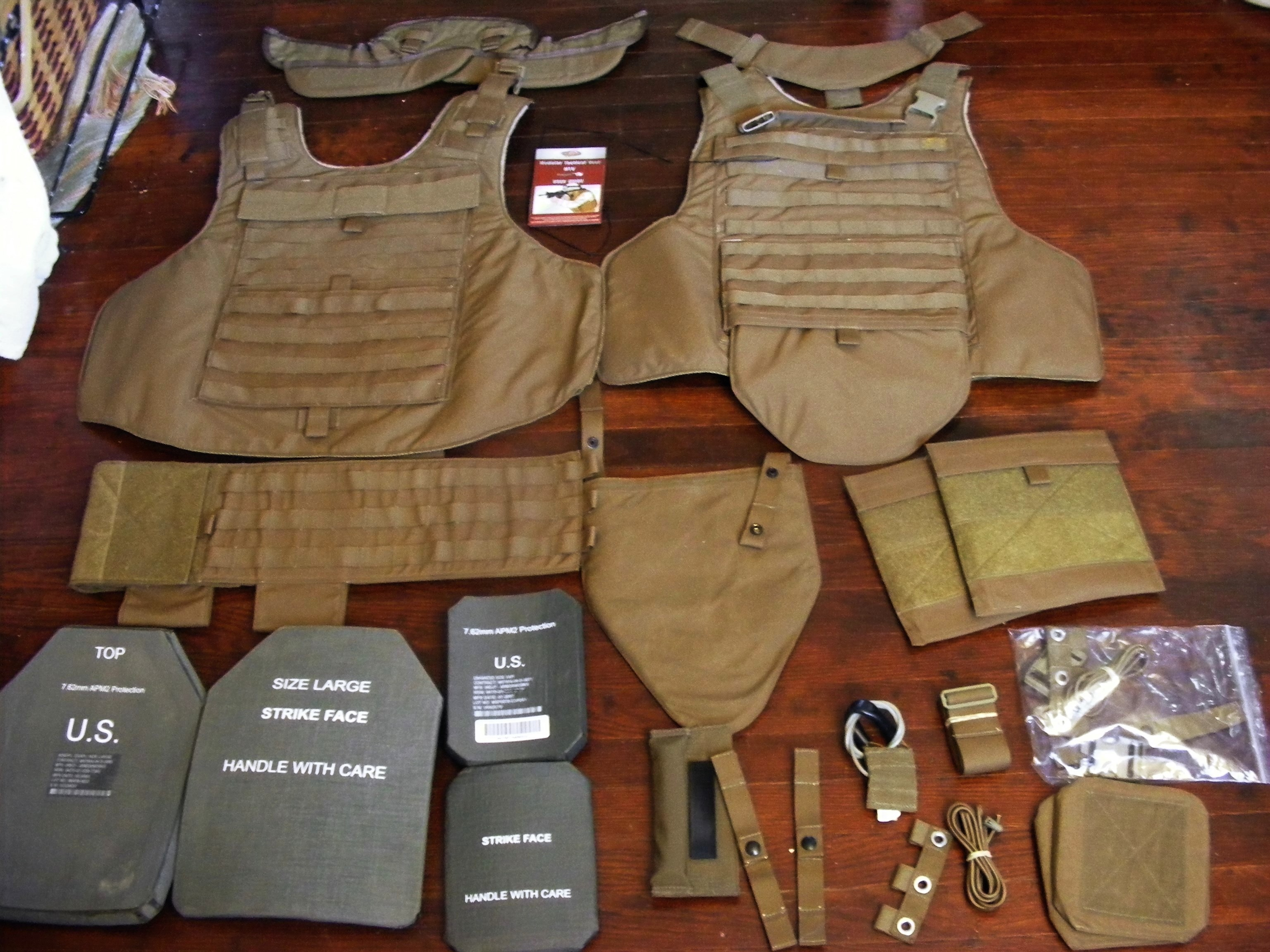
An MTV broken down into its basic components

The MTV includes the following features:

- Quick-release system to remove the vest in emergencies, meant to help corpsmen get to an injured Marine's body. Troops complained that the pull string got caught on equipment and the MTV would accidentally fall off in the middle of battle.
- Greater coverage of the lower back, side torso, and shoulders.
- Integrated side SAPI pouches.
- Integrated channels for communications wiring.
- Rifle bolster to assist in seating the wearer's rifle.
- Same modular PALS webbing as the Interceptor.
- A changed closure system. This was intended to be an improvement, but some wearers have complained that it takes too long to put on because the vest slips over the head. An updated version of the MTV is currently in production to address these issues.

The vest is donned and doffed using a hook-and-pile "cummerbund," which fastens around the waist, and a buckle atop each shoulder. Some users have complained that the vest is more time-consuming to don (especially with a full combat load attached) when compared to the Interceptor's single hook-and-loop flap. The quick-release system was designed in response to concerns that the Interceptor was difficult for medical personnel to remove from incapacitated troops and in some cases had to be cut off. When pulled firmly, a cord at the bottom of the vest causes the cummerbund to separate into two pieces. The shoulder buckles can then be unfastened and the vest removed in pieces, with no need to change the casualty's body position.

=== Improved Modular Tactical Vest ===
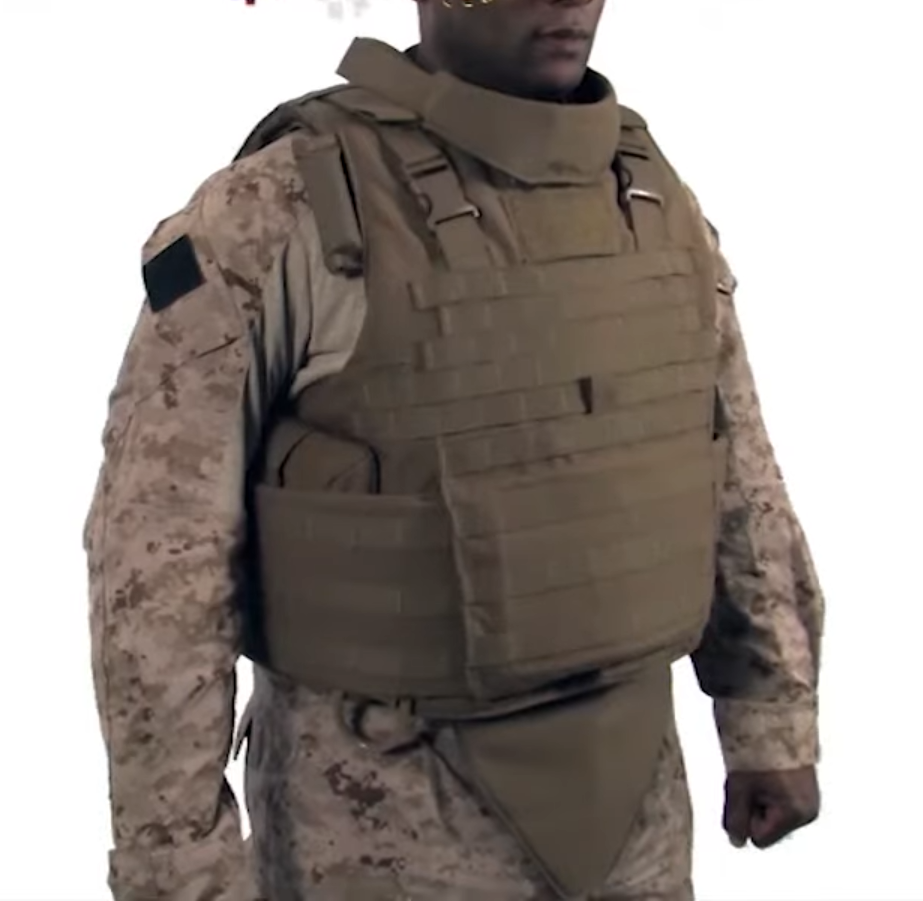
IMTV (Improved Modular Tactical Vest)

In July 2013, the Marine Corps announced its Improved Modular Tactical Vests. The IMTV is made for smaller stature Marines who cannot wear the full-sized MTV comfortably. The vest comes in small-short, medium-short, and large-short sizes. Most Marines use the Scalable Plate Carrier in the field, so it is hoped that the additional sizes will encourage Marines to wear the IMTV in combat. The Corps does not want to design female-specific body armor and has found that the issue was different statures related to the length of the torso. The IMTV can fit women as well as smaller stature men.

== Protection offered ==
The vest has slots for NIJ Level 3A analogue (it is not tested against .44 SWC) kevlar soft armor inserts, with additional slots for hard armor plates, in this case the Enhanced Small Arms Protective Inserts (ESAPI). The ESAPI Rev G, the latest model of such armor plates, will protect the wearer against three(3) rounds of .30-06 M2AP at a velocity of 870 m/s(V0); and will stop multiple hits of lesser threats such as 5.56×45mm NATO, 7.62×51mm NATO, and 7.62×39mm. This is opposed to Rev A versions, which would stop two(2) .30-06 M2AP at a velocity of 870 m/s(V0).

== Users ==
Moldovan soldiers seen with Modular Tactical Vests, August 2026.

- Moldova
- United States: United States Marine Corps and attached naval personnel.

== See also ==
- Family of Improved Load Bearing Equipment
- Improved load-bearing equipment
- List of United States Marine Corps individual equipment
