= ILBE (disambiguation) =

ILBE is Improved load-bearing equipment.

Ilbe or ILBE may also refer to:

- Ilbe Storehouse, South Korean Internet forum that has a predominantly far-right userbase
- Iervolino and Lady Bacardi Entertainment
