= Propper =

American military clothing manufacturer

Propper International
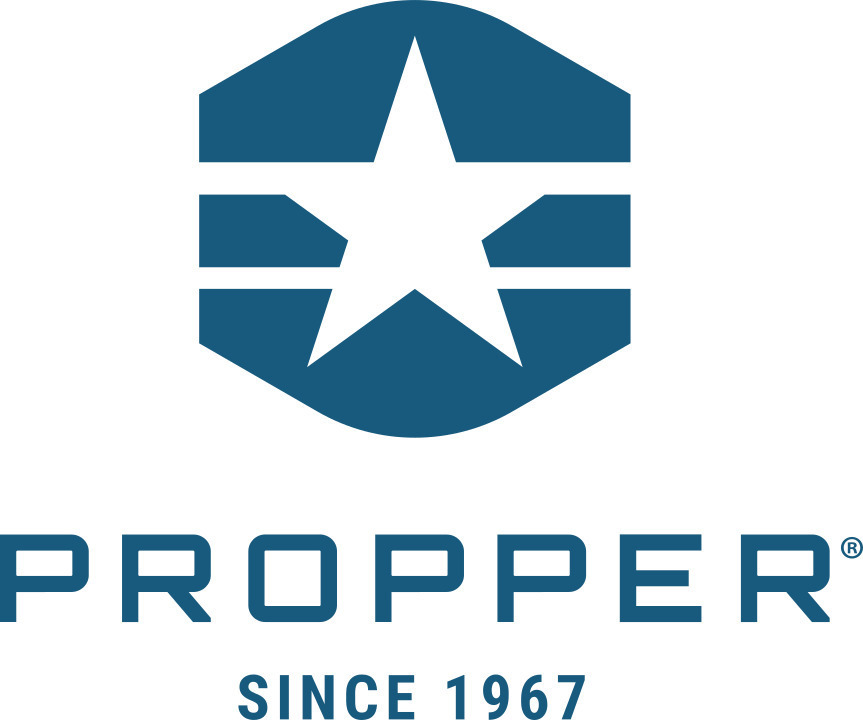
- Logo updated 2024
- Industry: Tactical and Military Clothing Manufacturing
- Founded: 1967
- Founder: William S. Propper
- Headquarters: St. Charles, Missouri, United States
- Area served: United States
- Products: Military, Public Safety and Tactical Clothing and Gear, including boots, tactical pants, bags, and accessories.
- Website: propper.com

Propper is a manufacturer of clothing and gear for tactical, law enforcement, EMS, fire services, coast guard, air force, public safety, and military applications. Since 1967, it has been one of the main uniform suppliers to the United States military. The company has supplied over 160 million garments to the U.S. Department of Defense, making it the leading supplier in terms of volume to the U.S. Armed Forces. The company is based in St. Charles, Missouri, and operates as both a government contractor and a commercial supplier.

== History ==
Propper International was founded in 1967 by William S. Propper and landed its first government contract with the U.S. Navy, manufacturing the iconic white sailor caps known as "Dixie cups." As one of the largest official suppliers to the United States armed forces, Propper International has manufactured over 160 million garments for the U.S. Department of Defense – Army, Air Force, Navy, Marines, Coast Guard and Special Forces. Propper also manufactures apparel for the commercial military, tactical, law enforcement, and public safety markets and sells through both dealer/retailer channels and online through e-commerce. Propper commercial products are distributed through more than 3,000 military and law enforcement and specialty retail stores and websites across the country.

In 2015, the company began offering boots, expanding beyond its traditional uniform manufacturing. Additionally, Propper International operates eight manufacturing facilities in Puerto Rico, including two in Cabo Rojo (Reto 1 and Reto 2), three in Mayagüez (Mayagüez 1, Mayagüez 2, and Equa), and locations in Lajas, Adjuntas, and Las Marías (Hunca Munca). The Cabo Rojo facilities serve as the primary production hub, collectively producing around 200,000 units monthly with a global workforce exceeding 1,000 employees.

In 2023, the company integrated Coats Digital's GSDCost solution into its manufacturing processes. This technological upgrade is projected to improve production efficiency by 3 to 7 percent.

== Products ==
Propper's core product has always been the current standard issue U.S. military uniform. More recently, they expanded their product line to include clothing for law enforcement officers, firefighters and emergency medical personnel.

=== Military ===
Propper is a prime contractor in nearly every branch of the U.S. military. In 2015 the company began offering boots.

The Propper Battle Dress Uniform was issued to the U.S. Army, Navy, Marines and Air Force. It used M81 Woodland and Desert Camouflage.

The Army Combat Uniform is the current combat uniform worn by the U.S. Army. It introduced the Universal Camouflage Pattern and also uses MultiCam pattern in Operation Enduring Freedom in Afghanistan during military operations. Airman Battle Uniform Marine Corps Combat Utility Uniform

Propper also manufactures flight suits for military aircrew and support personnel. These suits are built to military specifications and designed for durability, mobility, and protection during operations. Other garments manufactured by Propper and worn by branches of the military include:

- Multi-Climate Protection System (MCPS) Types 1, 2 and 3 (All branches)
- CWU/27P Nomex Flight Suit (All branches) - Flame-resistant Nomex® fabric with reinforced shoulders and bi-swing back for mobility. Features multiple pockets for emergency equipment and tactical gear, NIR-compliant for operational security.
- Generation 2 Extreme Cold Weather Clothing System (Gen 2 ECWCS) (Army)
- All Purpose Environmental Clothing System (APECS) (Air Force and Marines)
- Flame-Resistant Organizational Gear (FROG) Combat Shirt and Trouser (Marines)
- Flame-Resistant Army Combat Uniform (FR ACU) (Army)
- NFPA-Compliant Airman Battle Uniform (Air Force)
- Foul Weather Parka II (Coast Guard)
- Foul Weather Liner II (Coast Guard)
- Improved Hot Weather Combat Uniform (IHWCU) - lightweight variants for hot climates
- A2CU two-piece military flight suit in OCP (Air Force)
- MA-1 Flight Jacket
- M65 Field Jacket
- MOLLE 4K Rucksack
- USMC Sleep System (sleeping bags)

=== Law Enforcement ===
Propper is a leading supplier of law enforcement apparel and tactical gear across the United States. The company manufactures professional uniforms and equipment tailored for patrol officers, specialized response units, and other law enforcement personnel. Leveraging its extensive military manufacturing expertise.

Propper also provides a full range of police uniforms, tactical pants, and tactical bags. One bag, the UC Pack, is based on the Marine Corps FILBE complete with MOLLE attachment points and extensive use of hook and loop fasteners.

Products manufactured by Propper for law enforcement include:

- Kinetic® Tactical Pant (NEXStretch® fabric with reinforced knees and stain-repellent finish)
- RevTac Stretch Tactical Pants
- BDU Trousers (100% cotton ripstop, with six pockets)
- I.C.E.® Performance Polo (durable, classic-fit polo for professional appearance and comfort)
- RevTac Stretch Tactical Shirts (long and short sleeve)
- M65 Field Coats
- Lightweight Edgetec Outdoor Utility Vest

=== Tactical and Duty Footwear ===
Since 2015, Propper has expanded into tactical and duty footwear with its Series 100® collection. These boots are available in 6" and 8" heights and meet all AR 670-1 requirements, combining rugged construction with advanced comfort technologies including breathable linings, cushioned insoles, and fast-roping sole designs. The collection includes variants such as side-zip, lace-up, waterproof, and composite toe options for both military and law enforcement applications.

Additional tactical boot lines include Tactical Duty, Duralight, and Shift Low Top models, which incorporate ergonomic designs to balance durability, performance, and comfort for professionals across various sectors.

=== Wildland Firefighter Apparel ===
Propper offers NFPA 1977 certified wildland firefighting apparel, including shirts, pants, and overshirts crafted from Nomex® and Tecasafe® fabrics. These materials provide exceptional flame resistance, durability, moisture management, and comfort necessary for the rigorous demands of wildland firefighting operations. Propper offers the following wildland firefighting apparel products:

- USDA Forest Service certified Wildland Fire Shirt (Tecasafe®)
- Flame Resistance Wildland Overpant
- Dual-Compliant Wildland Station Pant (with anti-static fibers in a plain weave that resists melting)
- Cal Fire Wildland Jacket
- Wildland Fire Pant (USDA Forest Service certified)
- Wildland Overshirt (keeps flames at bay by providing excellent coverage)
- High-strength Wildland Belt
- Synergy® Wildland Shirt (Inherent heat and flame resistance)
- Lightweight and breathable Wildland Full Face Protector

== Awards ==
Propper has received 7 awards from the Defense Logistics Agency dating as far back as 1995.

- 2015 – DLA Silver Supplier
- 2014 – DLA Silver Supplier
- 2011 – Employer Partnership of the Armed Forces
- 2011 – DOD Employer Support of the Guard and Reserve
- 2004 – DLA Vendor Excellence Award Operation Enduring Freedom and Operation Iraqi Freedom
- 2004 – Vendor Excellence Award
- 1995 – Vendor of the Year

== Recent Government Contracts ==
Propper International has secured several significant government contracts in recent years, demonstrating its continued role as a major defense supplier:

- June 27, 2025: Awarded a $57.0 million firm-fixed-price, indefinite-delivery/indefinite-quantity contract for hot weather combat improved boots. The three-year, six-month contract includes ordering through December 2028. The contracting activity is the Defense Logistics Agency Troop Support, Philadelphia, PA (Contract SPE1C1-25-D-0063) for the U.S. Army.
- September 2024: Received a $77.2 million contract modification for the 3-Season Sleep System and components (Contract SPE1C1-20-D-1351). The agreement supports the Army, Navy, Air Force, and Marine Corps through September 2025.
- July 2024: Awarded a $19.6 million five-year contract for unisex dress gloves, serving the Army, Navy, Air Force, and Coast Guard through July 2029 (Contract SPE1C1-24-D-0058).
- December 2023: Received a $42.7 million contract for modular lightweight load-carrying equipment (MOLLE) components, supporting the Army and Air Force through December 2026.
