= Improved load-bearing equipment =

Individual equipment program by the US Marine Corps

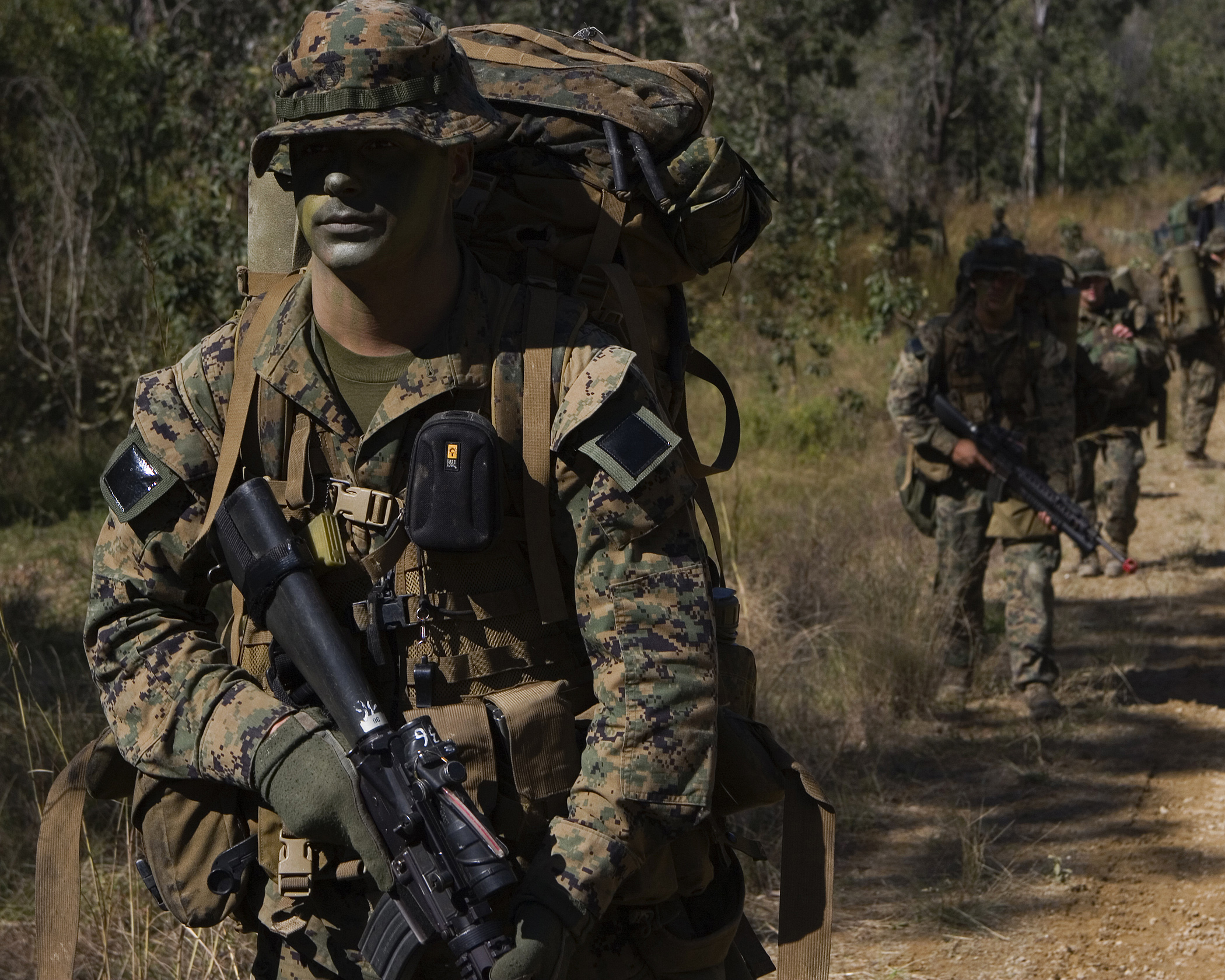
Marine wearing the ILBE during a training exercise in 2007

The improved load-bearing equipment (ILBE) is a United States Marine Corps program that had included individual load carriage equipment, individual hydration systems, and individual water purification.

Since the rucksack was the first component of the program to be issued to Marines, the rucksack is commonly referred to as simply the ILBE. The ILBE rucksack was designed to replace the long existing all-purpose lightweight individual carrying equipment (ALICE) packs and newer modular lightweight load-carrying equipment (MOLLE) packs.

== Development ==
On August 14, 2002, the US Marine Corps presented a Commercial Area Announcement (CAA), soliciting designs for an Improved Load Bearing Equipment (ILBE) system. The Marine Corps Systems Command (MCSC) determined the top two designs of those submitted from the commercial vendors were those of Bianchi (Gregory) and Propper International (Arc'teryx).

Arc'teryx's design weighed 8 pounds (3.6 kg) and carried 5,000 cubic inches, while the Gregory design weighed 10 pounds (4.5 kg) and carried 4,520 cubic inches. From January 2003 through June 2003, a Field User Evaluation was conducted, seeing 900 systems from each vendor (Gregory and Arc'teryx) tested across Marine units. The US Army Research Institute of Environmental Medicine (USARIEM) performed a series of biomechanical tests to evaluate the two selected packs and to compare them to the existing MOLLE packs.

Parts of the ILBE system were derived from items in Arc'teryx's Law Enforcement and Armed Forces (LEAF) product line. The finalized ILBE system was designed by Arc'teryx, and was later manufactured by Propper.

== Fielding ==
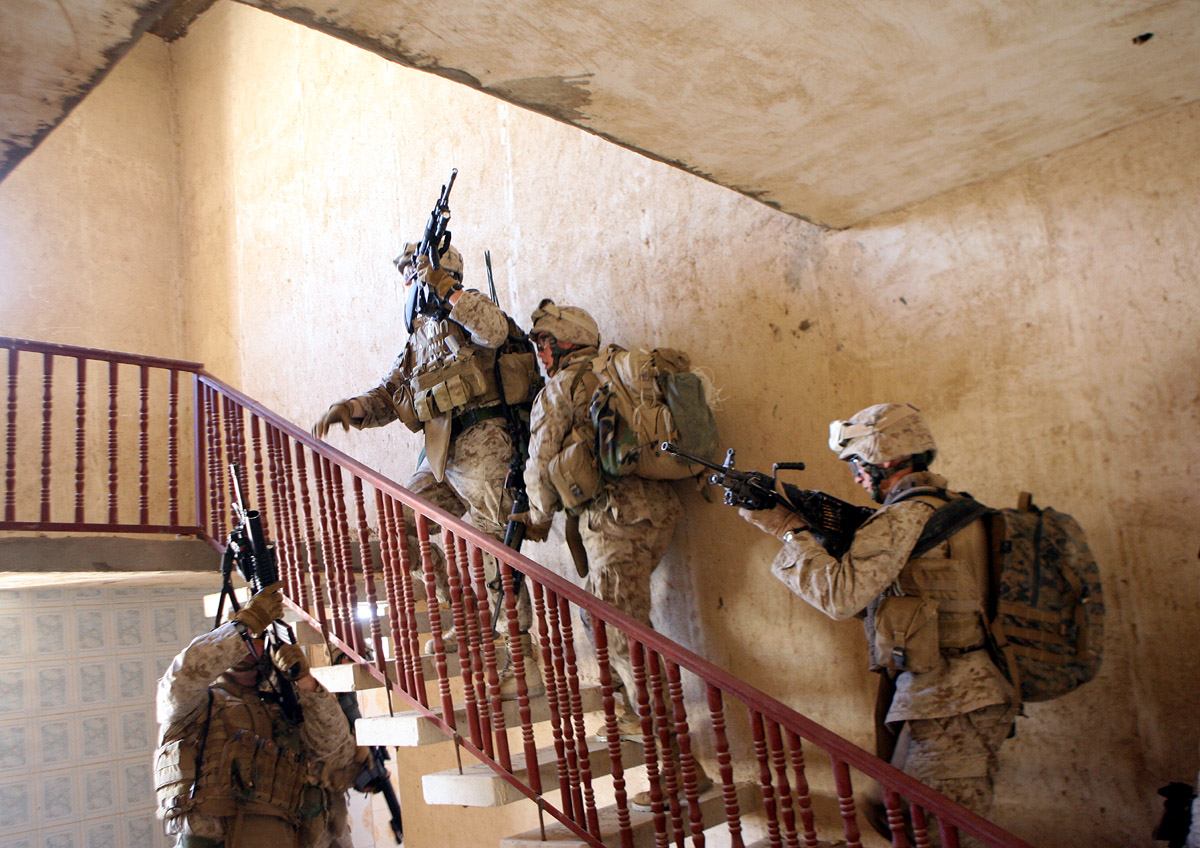
Marine at the very right is wearing the assault pack component of the ILBE pack

In January 2004, ILBE began the process of being fielded.

In 2005, ILBE's initial operational capability (IOC) was reached, signifying the initial units who received ILBE had received necessary training on the system and that its repair parts were available.

In April 2006, ILBE had a monthly production rate of 4,700/month.

The full operational capability (FOC) of ILBE was forecasted to be reached in mid 2007. The FOC having been reached would imply that the majority of the force had been outfitted with ILBE, and would also have received the necessary training and adequate access to spare parts.

== Components ==
The assault packs, with their smaller volume and lower weight capacities, are intended for wear in combat, while the larger main packs are intended to carry everything needed by a unit on the march.

The backpack is made from 725 denier Cordura material (725 D), with the MARPAT camouflage pattern printed onto it. The pack is also covered with a wide grid of the Pouch Attachment Ladder System (PALS), for the attachment of smaller modular pouches. It includes a main pack, a detachable assault pack and a 3-liter (3L) capacity, 100-ounce (6.3 lb), water reservoir as part of the hydration system.

The ILBE system includes 6 types of packs:

- Main pack (75 liters or 4,600 cubic inches)
- Recon main pack (90 liters or 5,500 cubic inches)
- Assault pack (27 liters or 1,600 cubic inches)
- Corpsman assault pack (CAP) (39 liters or 2,400 cubic inches)
- Recon assault pack (39 liters or 2,400 cubic inches)
- Recon accessory pouch (5 liters or 310 cubic inches)
- Hydration system (3 liters or 180 cubic inches)

These packs are paired with waterproofing bags in 56 L or 3,400-cubic-inch, 65 L or 4,000-cubic-inch, and 9 L or 550-cubic-inch capacities.

The ILBE can hold up to 120 pounds (54 kg) of weight, and has room for both 60mm and 81mm mortar rounds outside the main pack. Additional irregularly-shaped gear such as skis, snow shoes, or shoulder-launched multipurpose assault weapons (SMAWs) can also be attached. Specialized bags and pouches for corpsmen and reconnaissance units are also available.

A set of packs typically consists of a main pack, an assault pack, and a hydration system. These three items together cost more than $600 when the ILBE system was first fielded, making it the most expensive single soldier pack system used by the US armed forces.

== Criticism ==
Because the ILBE was fielded before the creation of the Modular Tactical Vest (MTV), the pack did not integrate well with the fighting systems at the time (such as the Interceptor Body Armor), and excessive stress in conjunction with the wearing of body armor could cause discomfort and injury.

== Future ==
The Marine Corps Systems Command (MCSC) announced that a replacement was forthcoming in 2009, with possible replacements, including two entries from Mystery Ranch, Granite Gear, and the United States Army improved variant of MOLLE.

In 2011, the Corps had finished testing and evaluation, releasing a solicitation for prototypes under the designation Family of Improved Load Bearing Equipment (FILBE), outlining design requirements that are similar to the improved MOLLE system.

== See also ==
- Family of improved load-bearing equipment (FILBE)
- Modular lightweight load-carrying equipment (MOLLE)
- All-purpose lightweight individual carrying equipment (ALICE)
- Modular Tactical Vest (MTV)
- Interceptor body armor (IBA)
- Marine Corps Combat Utility Uniform (MCCUU)
