= Scalable Plate Carrier =

Plate carrier developed and used by the United States Marine Corps

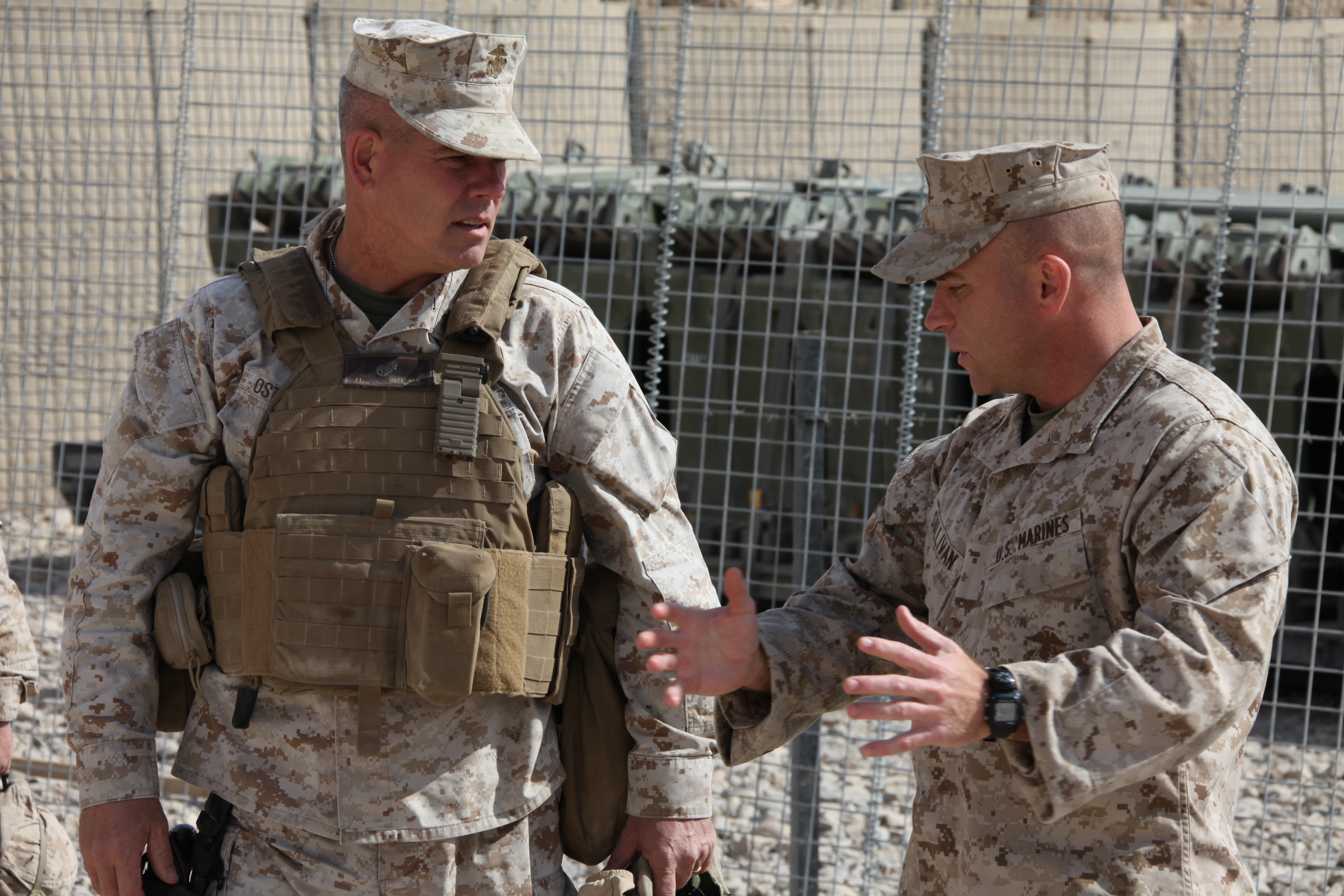
A USMC Brigadier General wearing a Scalable Plate Carrier in Afghanistan in 2011.

The Scalable Plate Carrier (SPC) is a plate carrier used by the United States Marine Corps as an alternative to the heavier Modular Tactical Vest (MTV).

== History ==
=== Design ===
It is a lightweight plate carrier intended to supplement the Modular Tactical Vest. Key issues with the previous MTV, specifically ergonomics, have been remedied with the addition of new features such as adjustment buckles and improved padding on the shoulders. These new improvements are intended to make the vest much more comfortable to wear in comparison to the MTV. It resembles the Eagle Industries MBAV and has staggered MOLLE webbing on the chest.

=== First generation ===
The SPC was fielded to combat units operating in the War in Afghanistan in 2008 as a lightweight alternative to the MTV, where it has proved popular because of the region's mountainous terrain. Marines now typically deploy with both the MTV and SPC, with commanders setting the requirements for which vest should be worn based on threat levels. The Scalable Plate Carrier was analyzed for the U.S. Army's Soldier Plate Carrier System demonstration.

=== Improved Scalable Plate Carrier ===
The Improved Scalable Plate Carrier (ISPC) was introduced in 2011; it is expected that the Improved Modular Tactical Vest (IMTV) will replace the ISPC.
