= Pakistan Life Saving Foundation =

Non-governmental organization

Pakistan Life Saving Foundation (PALS)
- Established: 2004
- Founder: Reza Samad
- Headquarters: Karachi, Pakistan
- Location: Karachi, Pakistan
- Services: Beach Rescues, Drowning Prevention, Water Safety
- Staff: +250 Lifeguards
- Website: www.pals.pk

Pakistan Life Saving Foundation (PALS Rescue or PALS) is a non-governmental organization (NGO) in Pakistan, established in 2004 to provide life-saving services on the beaches of Karachi. It is the country's only free, privately-run, near-shore drowning prevention and rescue body. It employs around 250 lifeguards recruited from the neighboring coastal fishing communities.

== History ==
Karachi's coastline on the Arabian Sea is extremely rough during the monsoon season from mid-May to mid-August, which is also the period of the year when the beaches see the most visitors. Before PALS Rescue was established, there were only 30 designated lifeguards for the city's 27-kilometre (17-mile) beaches, with 18 to 20 lifeguards working on any given day.

Karachi's beaches are additionally hazardous because the beach surface is not leveled and modified to minimize hazards. The strong currents have no hindrance due to absence of coral reefs that usually break these currents. The sea is most dangerous in the monsoon season, when the beaches see major footfall connected with the summer vacations for schools. The beach goers are often unaware of water safety and are not strong swimmers; combined with the scarcity of lifeguards, this resulted in large numbers of drowning cases every year. Eventually in 2004, PALS Rescue was formed as an NGO registered under the Directorate of Social Welfare of the Government of Sindh.

Initially PALS worked to establish a life-guarding service along the most visited beaches in Karachi, appealing to existing life-saving institutions in other countries for assistance. Surf Life Saving New Zealand's Northern Region (SLSNR) offered to help PALS with training and by donating essential equipment. In 2003, SLSNR sent an eight-member delegation to train 175 lifeguards from PALS, including Pakistan Navy and City Government Divers. At the end of the two-week intensive training course, 64 life guards were issued SLSNR Awards and 41 were issued certificates. In 2005, PALS became an independently established surf lifesaving service.

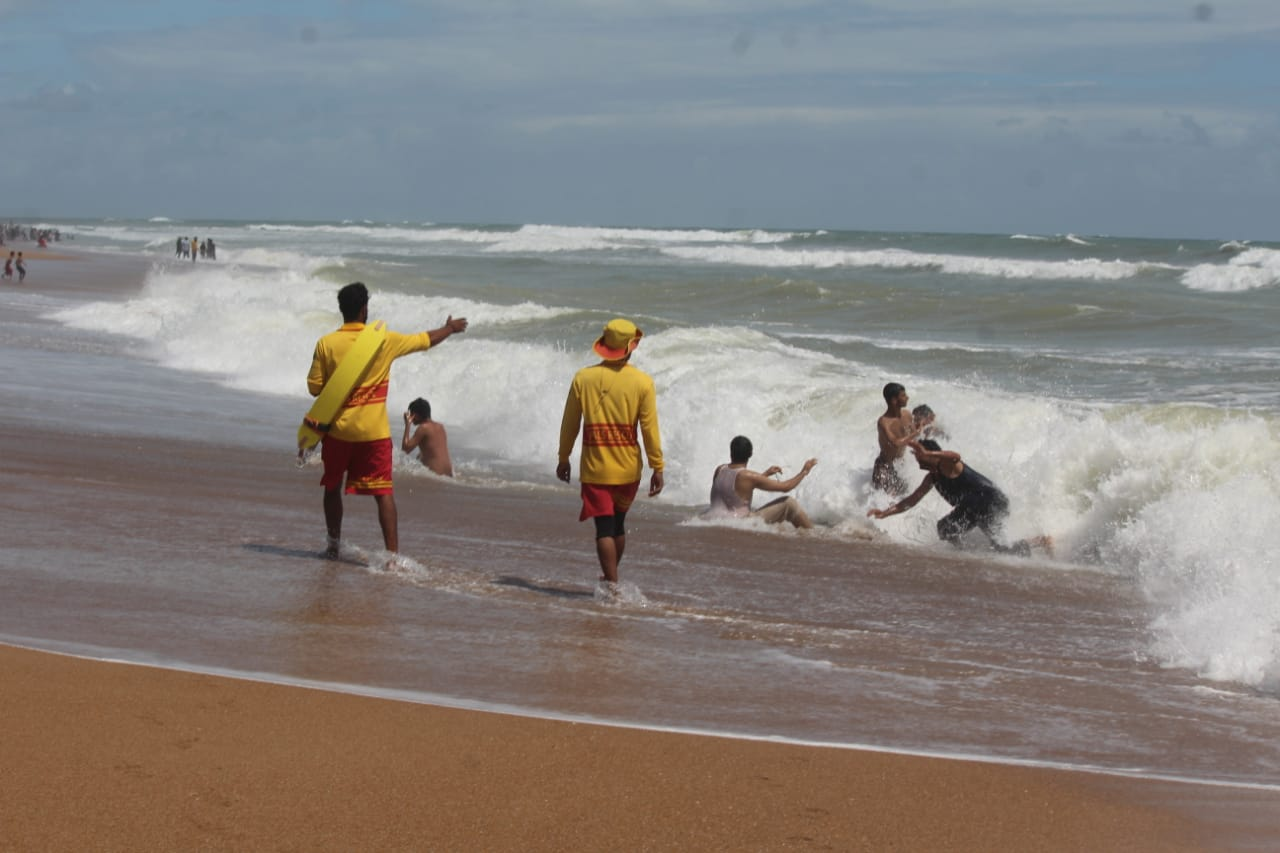
PALS Lifeguards cautioning people against rough waves on Sandspit Beach, Karachi

Before 2004, there were on average 250+ cases of drowning annually on Karachi beaches. PALS Rescue has been able to reduce this figure to near zero. According to the NGO's own data, they have saved almost 5,500 people from drowning along Karachi's beaches. They also conducted over 7,000,000 preventive actions providing advice to beach users that mitigated against the risk of drowning. PALS Rescue has provided first-aid to over 6,000 people.

== International affiliations ==
PALS Rescue is internationally accredited, representing Pakistan in the International Life Saving Federation (ILS) as a full member. It is also closely associated with Surf Life Saving New Zealand (SLSNZ) and is a member of the Royal Life Saving Society UK (RLSS).

== Safe Canal Project ==
PALS Rescue initiated the Safe Canal Project encompassing four villages in Khairpur. The pilot project was inaugurated in 2019 by Nafisa Shah, a Member of the National Assembly (MNA). Under this project, Khairpur's villagers were provided with safety equipment to safeguard against accidents along canal banks, which had previously been prevalent.

The pilot project was part of a planned large-scale development connecting a buoying net across the width of the canal with supporting poles. Anyone moving close to the canal is required to wear a life-jacket which protects them from drowning, and the net will prevent people from being swept away by the water.

== PALS Outdoors ==
PALS Outdoors is the commercial wing of PALS Rescue, established in 2010. It provides recreational activities and adventure tours in various locations in Pakistan, mainly in Karachi and Balochistan. PALS Outdoors established Pakistan's first adventure and ecotourism beach site with funding from the United States Agency for International Development (USAID).
