= Public Access Legal Support =

Public Access Legal Support (PALS) is a highly specific category of legal service providers in England & Wales that are distinct from solicitors, barristers and paralegals, and that operate only within the framework of the Public Access Scheme (otherwise known as 'Direct Access').

The Public Access Scheme (or 'Direct Access') enables consumers of legal services to instruct a barrister directly. The main advantage of the Scheme for consumers is the opportunity to save legal costs by avoiding the incurrence of solicitor's professional fees. However, removing solicitors from running a legal case often requires that clients themselves perform a considerable amount of document management, filing, and other related activities in the context of conducting litigation. Moreover, the current Public Access rules provide that barristers are not allowed to take on public access clients unless doing so is in both the client's best interests and in the interests of justice. Therefore, in complicated cases barristers must recommend to clients that they obtain external support from a solicitor or a PALS provider.

Since the expense of employing a solicitor in the context of the Public Access Scheme (or 'Direct Access') defeats the 'cost-saving' purpose of the Scheme, consumers can turn to a PALS provider, which offers a range of support facilities at a significantly lower cost in comparison to the professional services of a solicitor, thereby preserving the purpose of the Public Access Scheme.

The acronym PALS was first coined by Dr Yuri Rapoport B.Sc. SJD, head of the Kohen Rapoport Group, which launched UK's first PALS platform, known as PX Direct Access as part of PX Chambers Services.

Providers of PALS achieve their lower cost position (in comparison to solicitors professional fees) as they do not offer any legal advice and do not have the overhead cost of regulatory compliance nor high-level professional indemnity insurance.
