= Public Access Scheme =

In English law, method by which members of the public instruct a barrister

The Public Access Scheme ("Direct Access") allows members of the public in England and Wales to instruct a barrister directly. In the past, it was necessary for clients to use a solicitor or other third party in order to instruct a barrister.

== History ==
The Public Access Scheme was established in 2004. The scheme allowed members of the public to instruct barristers directly, without the involvement of a solicitor for the first time in more than a century. There was initially uncertainty as to whether clients would understand the limitations of barristers’ work.

Over the course of numerous consultations conducted by the Bar Standards Board, the rules for public access practice were gradually relaxed to serve the public interest, particularly in light of pending cuts to Legal Aid funding. The current Public Access rules, which enable a wider scope of direct public access to barristers than previous versions, are covered in C119-C131 of the Code of Conduct contained in the Bar Standards Board Handbook which came into force on 15 April 2015.

== Impacts ==
The main advantage of the Public Access Scheme for consumers of legal services is the opportunity to save on legal costs, specifically solicitor's fees. However, removing solicitors from the processes of running a legal case often requires that clients themselves must perform the majority of document management, filing, and other related activities in the context of conducting litigation.

Barristers are not allowed to take on public access clients unless doing so is in both the client's best interests and in the interests of justice. Therefore, in complicated cases barristers must recommend to clients that they obtain external support from a solicitor. However, since the expense of using a solicitor can potentially defeat the 'cost-saving' purpose of the Public Access Scheme, consumers have the option of using a provider of Public Access Legal Support service (PALS), which is a specialised paralegal resource catering to barristers and clients who work together within the framework of the Public Access Scheme.
