= Poncho liner =

Component of military field gear

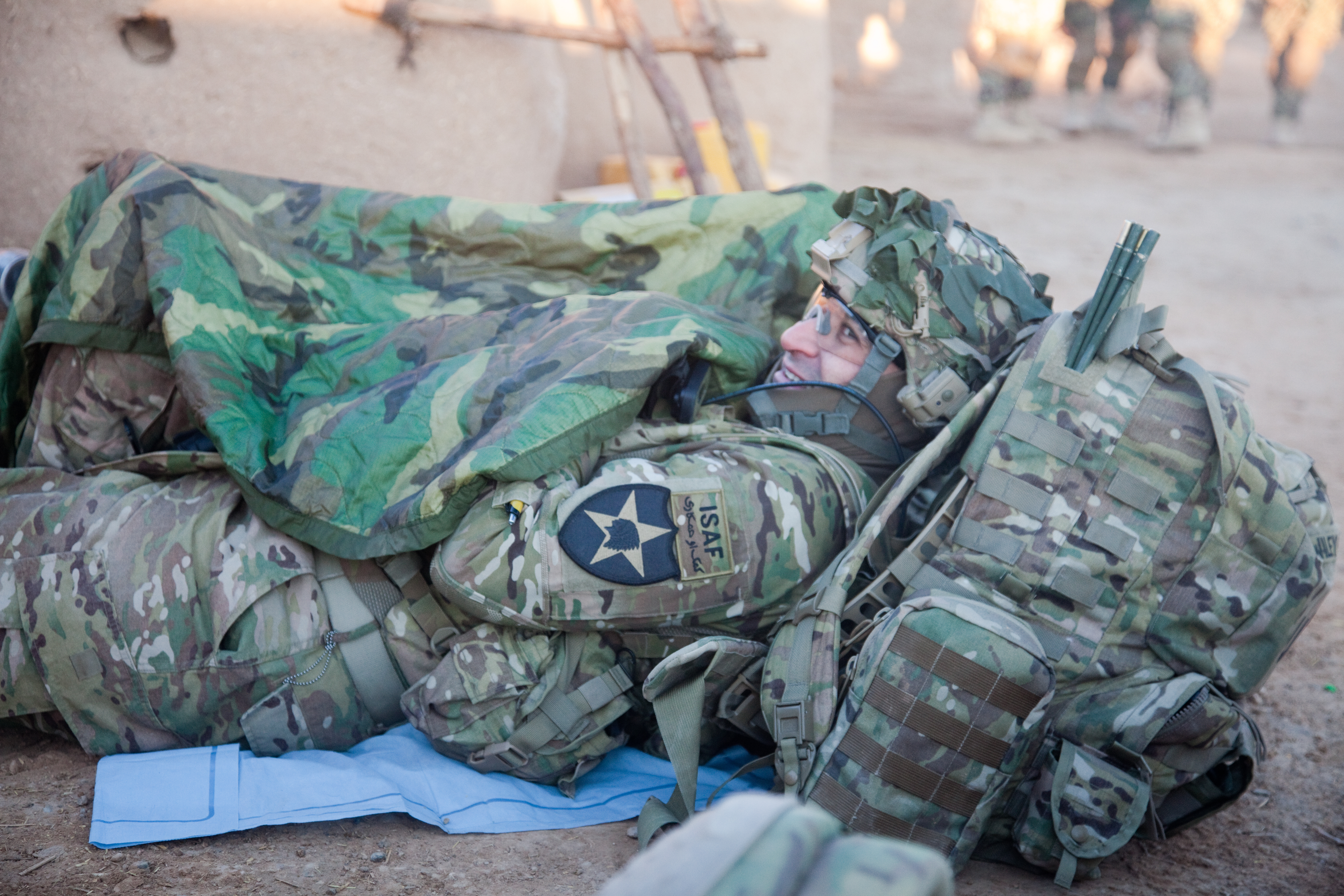
Soldier covering himself with a poncho liner (2012)

A poncho liner (often nicknamed a woobie) is a piece of field gear originating in the United States military that can be attached to a standard issue poncho to provide additional warmth, as well as being usable as a blanket, sleeping bag or tarp/protective cover. It consists of quilted nylon with a polyester filling, same materials as the liners for the US military fishtail parka and M65 Field jacket. It is attached to the poncho by means of integral lengths of material which are looped through the poncho's eyelets.

Poncho liners were first used by the U.S. military in the Vietnam War. Its official name is "Liner, Wet Weather Poncho". They gained the nickname "woobie" later; that term is conjectured to have derived from the name for a child's security blanket in the 1983 movie Mr. Mom. Another possibility is that "woobie" is a corruption of the Korean word for rain gear, "Ubi," or 우비, referring to the poncho, used by the Korean tailors on US military posts throughout Korea who were asked by many GIs to sew on a zipper to the edge of the poncho liner to make it into a light sleeping bag.

== Construction and history ==
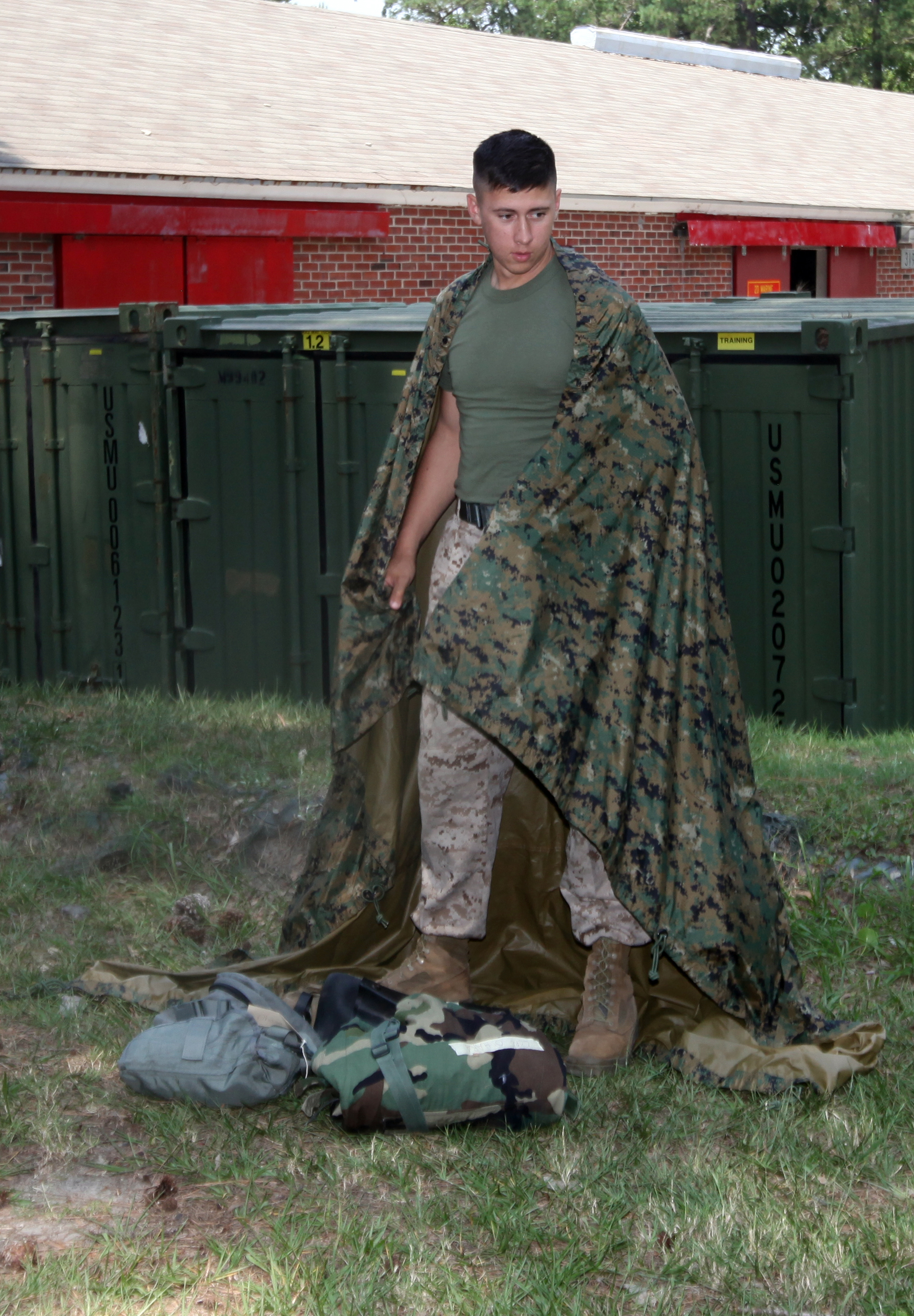
Demonstration of how to use a tarpaulin to protect from chemical agents

Although it is unclear how this item originated, it was first fielded around 1962 to special forces troops in Vietnam. The poncho liner consists of two layers of quilted nylon encasing a polyester batting. Polyester is light and fast drying, even more than wool. This would allow the military to field an item that easier to carry and more suitable for use in the wet and tropical environment of Vietnam, then the standard-issue Army Wool Blanket.

The first ones were Olive Drab on both sides and the earliest models featured squared corners. Around 1963, a second model was fielded which was made of WWII duck-hunter patterned parachute fabric. This model required the standard "center seam" because the fabric was not wide enough to produce the entire width. Later, the first camouflaged pattern was produced which was named, "ERDL Pattern." This stood for Engineer Research and Development Laboratories and the acronym became the common name for the pattern, which was enlarged somewhat in the 1980s to become the Woodland Pattern used on the BDU uniform and late 1980s poncho liners. The center seam was abandoned in the early 1970s because fabric could be produced in bolts that were wide enough that this sewing pattern was now obsolete.

Until the USMC produced their own Digital Woodland Pattern, most poncho liners were produced with the same pattern on both sides. The Marines decided to field one with Woodland Pattern on one side and a solid Coyote Color on the other. There are examples of improved models, which included high-tech 3M fillers (Thinsulate and the like), border and head zippers (there is no hole for one's head on standard issue poncho liners), and a variety of colors and patterns. Brigade Quartermaster, Inc. used to sell a zipper modification kit, which essentially codified and standardized commonly made modifications. Most recently, there have been models produced and issued in the Army's Universal Combat Pattern, the USAF's Environmental Camouflage Pattern, and Multicam/Scorpion II/etc.

== Opinions ==
Opinions among the troops generally held the poncho liner in high regard as a useful piece of equipment, light and packable yet reasonably warm. Even when soaking wet, the poncho liner wrapped around a soldier would trap body heat. Many soldiers went to great lengths to find ways to keep their poncho liners as long as possible, even when they leave the service often upcycling or custom tailoring them into smoking jackets, hoodies, blanket coats or robes.

== See also ==
- Shelter-half
