= Pouch Attachment Ladder System =

Grid of webbing used to attach smaller equipment onto load-bearing platforms

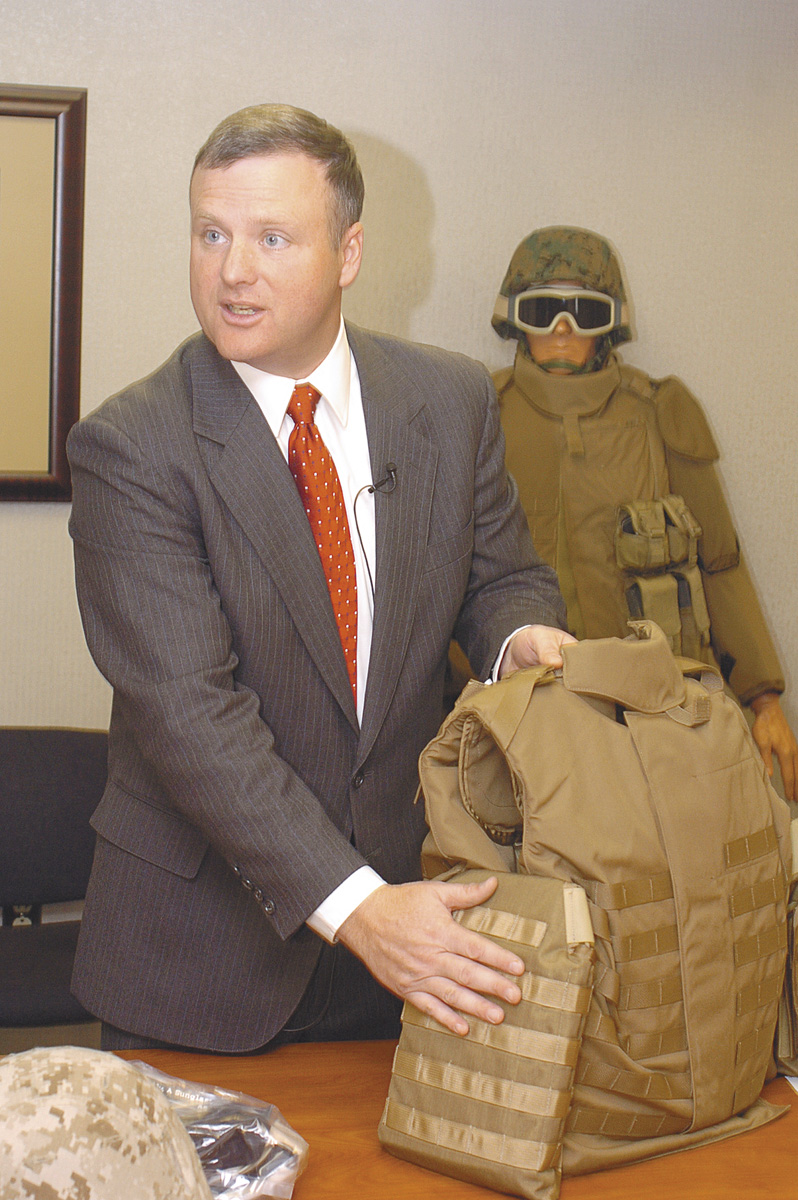
The PALS grid is easily visible in this image of the US Marine Corps' Interceptor Body Armor; note the pouches attached to the system in the background (2005)

The Pouch Attachment Ladder System or PALS is a grid of webbing invented and patented by United States Army Natick Soldier Research, Development and Engineering Center used to attach smaller equipment onto load-bearing platforms, such as vests and backpacks.

== Development ==
It was first used on MOLLE rucksacks, but is now found on a variety of tactical equipment, such as the U.S. Improved Outer Tactical Vest, Interceptor body armor, USMC improved load-bearing equipment backpack and Modular Tactical Vest.

== Design ==
The PALS is used to attach items such as holsters, magazine pouches, radio pouches, knife sheathes, and other gear. A wide variety of pouches are commercially available, allowing soldiers to customize their kit.

There is also a variety of attachment methods including the Alice Clip, the Natick snap, and soft, interwoven straps.

PALS consists of webbing sewn onto the load-bearing equipment and corresponding webbing and straps on the attachment. The straps are interwoven between the webbing on each of two pieces and finally snapped into place, making for a very secure fit which can be detached with moderate effort.

New types are laser cut out of single piece fabric rather than webbing straps sewn onto fabric. This is common on many new tactical items from backpacks to chest rigs. The spacing is the same standard so new lasercut ladders are 100% backwards compatible with older pouches made for webbing strap construction rigs.

=== Specifications ===
Pattern for PALS and MOLLE grids of webbing, which are based on 25 mm (1 in) wide webbing with 38 mm (1.5 in) spacing between each sewing point.

The PALS grid consists of horizontal rows of 25 mm (1 in) commercial item descriptions (CID) A-A-55301A(replacing Mil-W-43668) Type III nylon webbing (most commercial vendors use Type IIIa), spaced 25 mm apart, and reattached to the backing at 38 mm (1.5 in) intervals. The stitchings are spaced 38 mm (1.5 in) apart, with a range of 35–40 mm (1.4–1.6 in) considered acceptable in practice.

Newer styles come in various laser cut fabric, most commonly 1000D cordura nylon (some vendors use 500D–600D). The benefits often quoted for laser cut single piece style is significant weight saving especially on plate carriers/rigs and items with large amount of ladder area as well as less bulk. Another consideration is fabrics can be made in new popular patterns without need to source webbing in compatible shades including viewing conditions under night vision devices. Many of these specialist patterns are also available in NIR treated forms for optimal camouflage viewed through such night vision devices.

== Adoption ==
The PALS system has begun to be adopted by other forces, such as the British Army, who use it on their Osprey body armor.

== Gallery ==
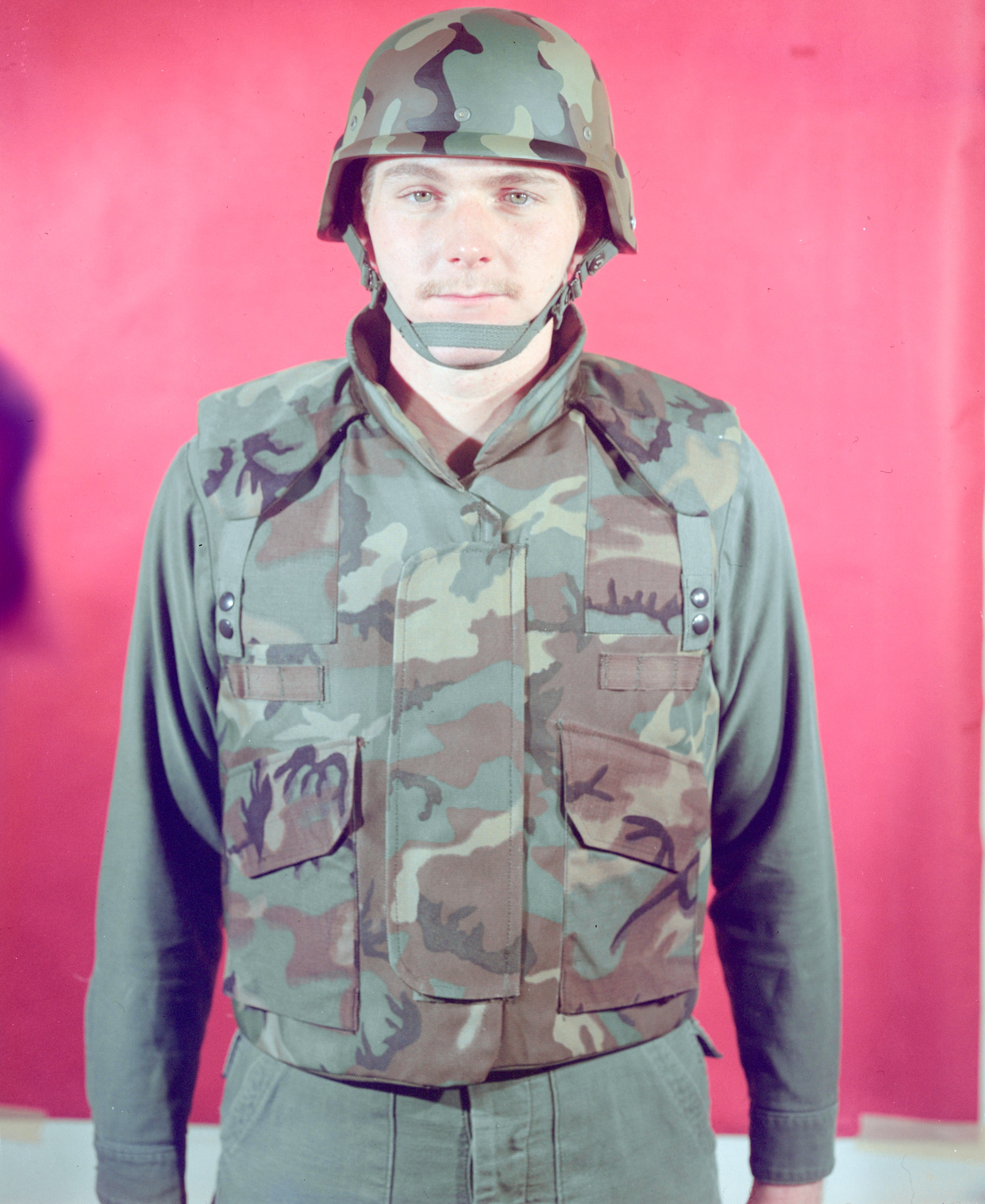
A man in 1975 modelling an early ERDL-patterned prototype of the PASGT vest, with two PALS webbing strips on the front.

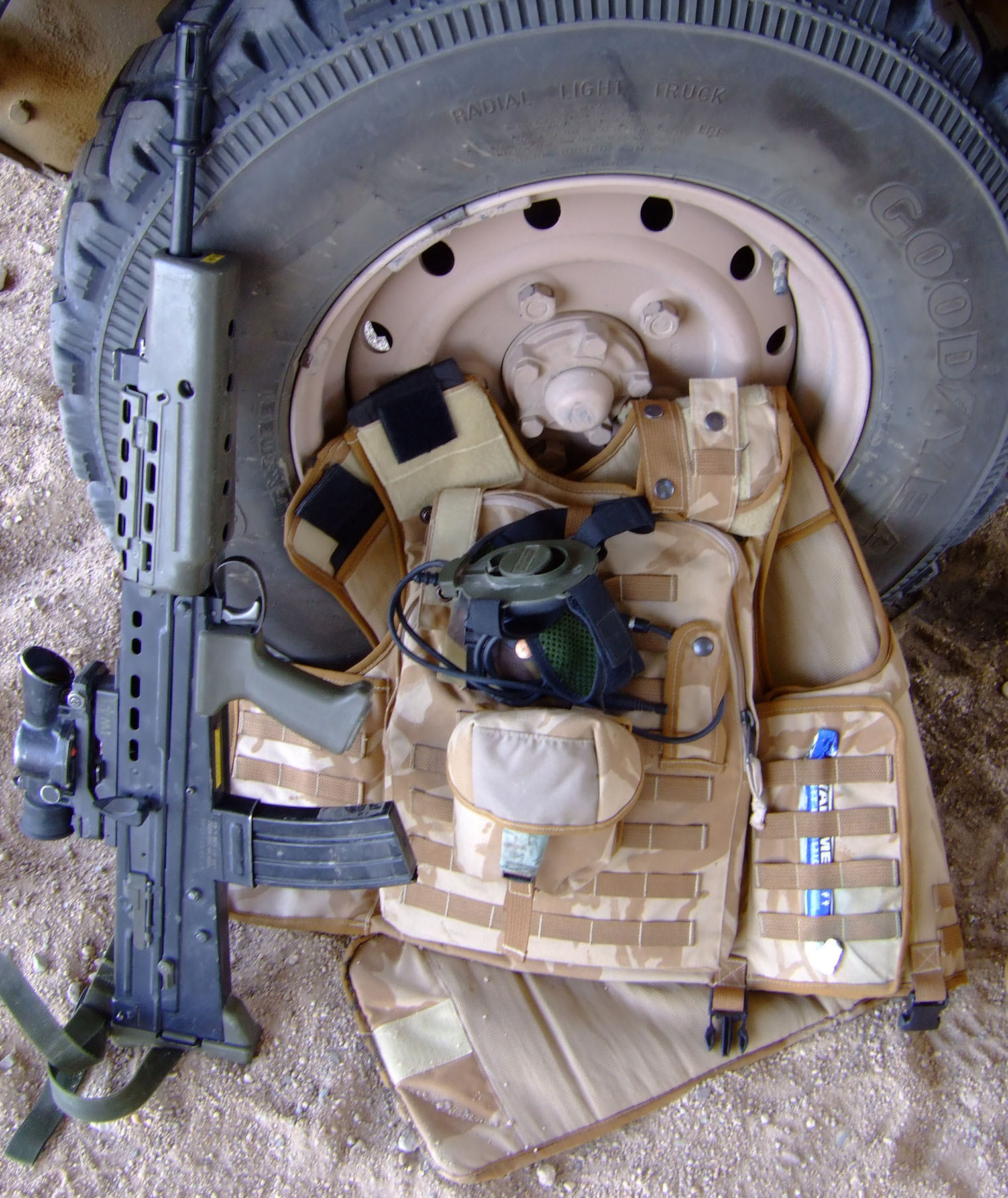
PALS grid on the United Kingdom's Osprey body armour

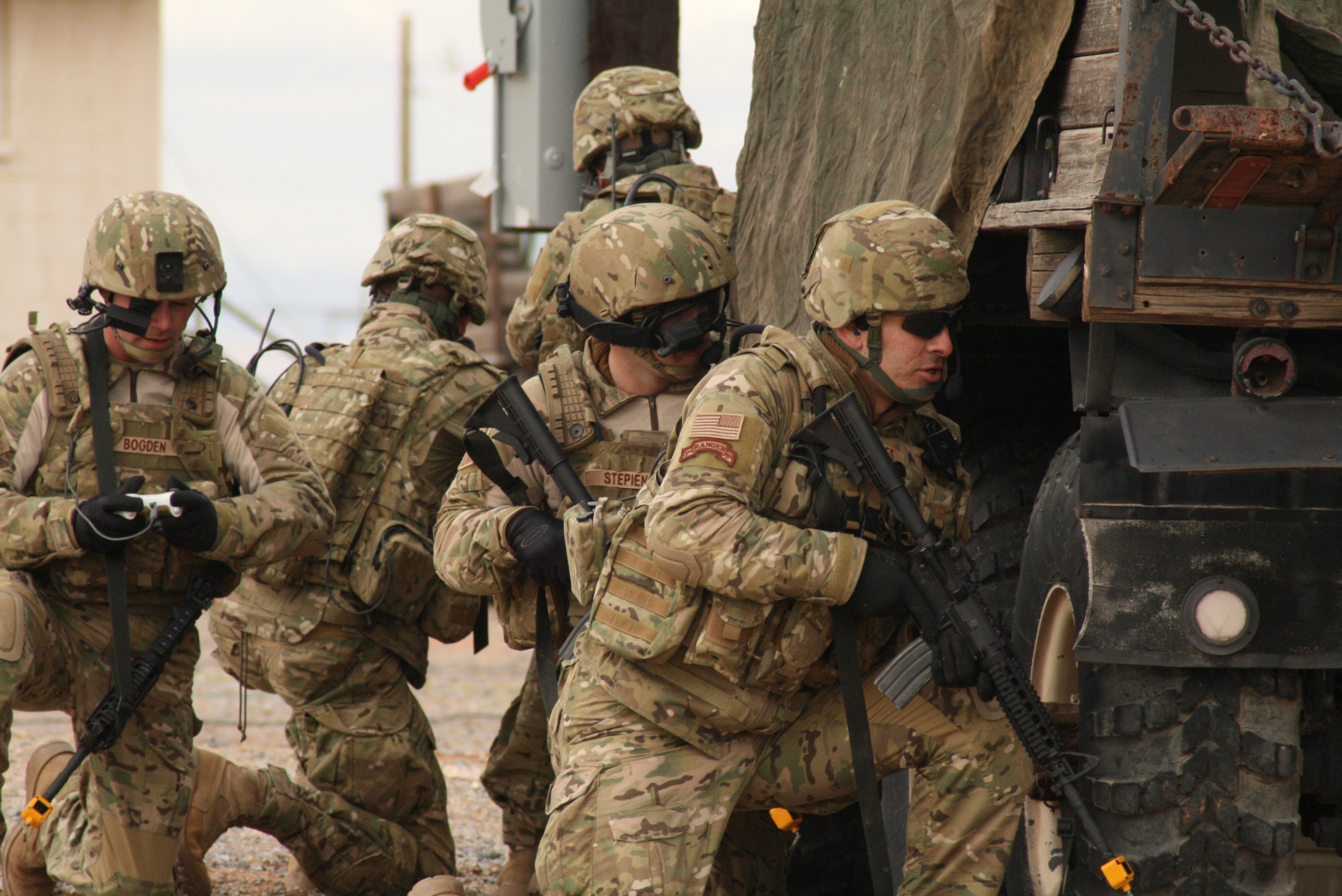
Pouches attached to body armor using the PALS grid are clearly visible in this image of soldiers from the Future Force Warrior program, including a hydration bladder.

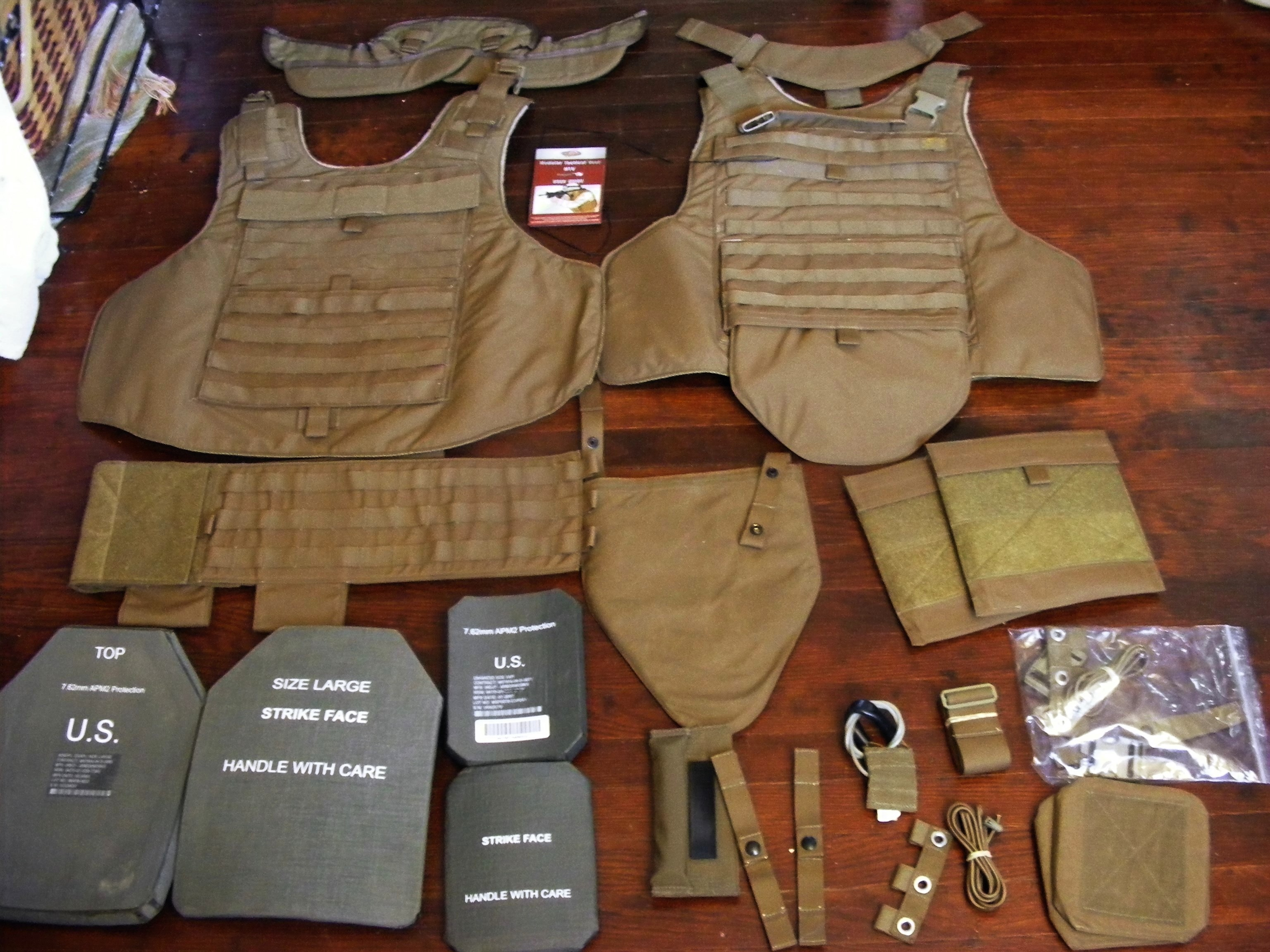
PALS grid on a USMC Modular Tactical Vest

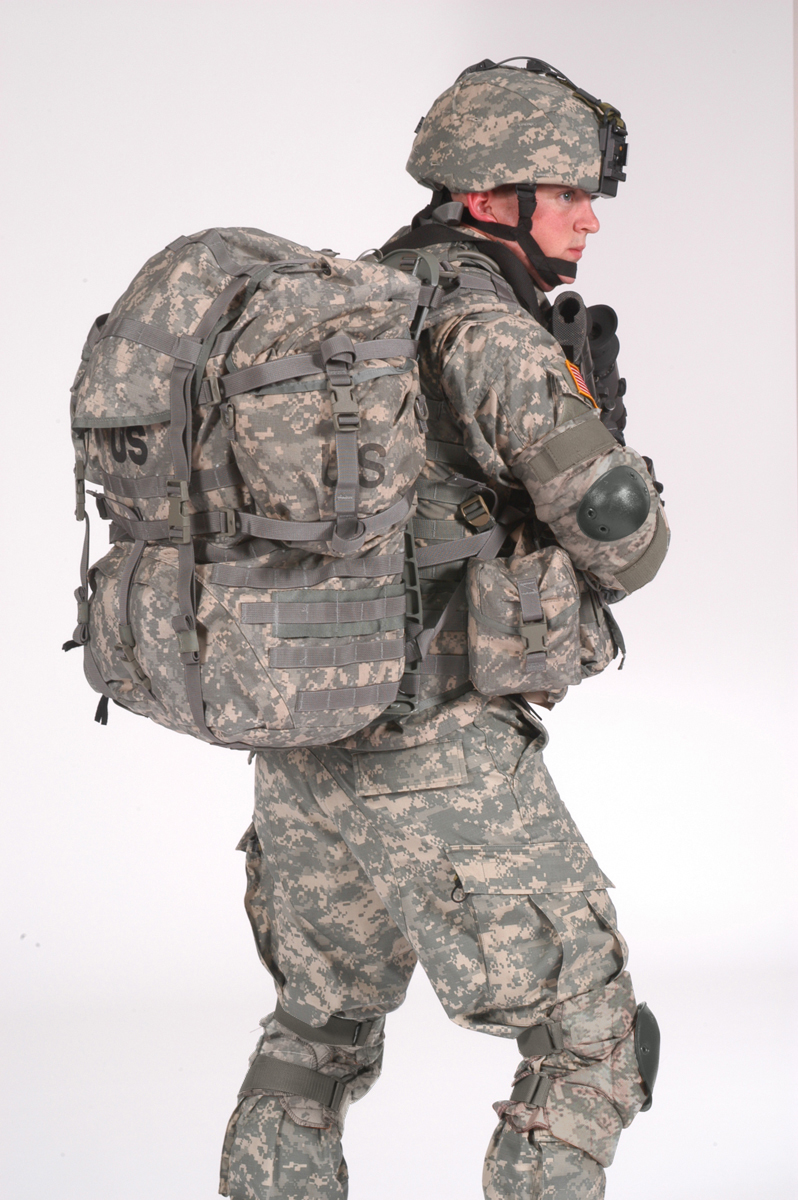
PALS grid on the MOLLE pack
