= Family of Improved Load Bearing Equipment =

Equipment used by the United States Marine Corps

Family of Improved Load Bearing Equipment (FILBE) is a series of equipment used by the United States Marine Corps for personal load carrying. It comprises the backpack and various attachments carried by an individual Marine in the field. The FILBE was designed as an improvement over the prior ILBE system that was not compatible with the newest body armor systems.

The FILBE consists of the following components:

1. USMC Pack System
  - Main Pack, NSN 8465-01-598-7693
    1. Frame, NSN 8465-01-600-7844
    2. Shoulder Harness Assembly, NSN 8465-01-600-7938
    3. Hip belt, NSN 8465-01-600-7870
    4. Main Bag
  - Assault Pack
  - Assault Pouch
  - Sustainment Pouch (qty. 2)
  - Hydration Pouch (qty. 2)
  - Hydration Carrier
  - Hydration Bladder System (CamelBak)
    1. 100 oz. Hydration Bladder
    2. Tube Kit
    3. Tube Holder
    4. Hydration Bite Valve with Cover
  - Sternum Cinch
  - Sub-Belt (known as "Girth Hip Belt")
  - Repair kit
    1. Toaste Ellipse Cordloc
    2. Grimloc
    3. GTLL Split-bar
    4. 1" Male Techno Grab (qty. 2)
    5. 1" Female Snap-on Repairable (qty. 2)
  - USMC Pack Instruction Card
2. Chest Rig
  - USMC Chest Rig Assembly
  - Harness Assembly
  - USMC Chest Rig Repair Kit
    1. Attaching Strap Assembly (for MTV/SPC)(2 pair)
    2. IMTV/PC Attaching Strap Assembly (2 pair)
    3. 1" Quick Attach Surface Mount (6 each)
    4. 1" Single Bar Repairable, Male (2 each)
    5. 1" Waveloc Repairable, Female (2 each)
    6. 1" Waveloc Repairable, Male (2 each)
  - USMC Chest Rig Instruction Card
3. USMC Equipment Pouches
  - 9mm 15 Round Magazine pouch
  - M16/M4 Speed Reload Magazine pouch
  - M16/M4 Single/Double Magazine pouch
  - 40mm Grenade pouch
  - Pop-up Flare pouch
  - M67 Grenade pouch
  - Squad Automatic Weapon (SAW)/Utility pouch
  - 12 Gauge Shotgun Shell pouch
  - Multi Grenade pouch
  - Dump pouch
4. USMC Holster
5. USMC Corpsman Assault System
  - Medical Assault Pack
  - Medical Sustainment Bag
  - Modular Medical Pouch
  - Medical Thigh Rig
  - Medical Inserts
    1. Narc Pouch
    2. Medium Pouch (Qty. 2)
    3. Large Pouch (Qty. 2)
    4. Small Reversible Pouch (Qty. 2)
    5. Medium Reversible Pouch (Qty. 2)
    6. Elastic Panel (Qty. 2)
    7. Double Pocket Panel
    8. Triple Pocket Panel
    9. Stacked Pocket Panel
6. Individual Water Purification System

== See also ==
- All-purpose lightweight individual carrying equipment (ALICE)
- Improved load-bearing equipment (ILBE)
- Interceptor body armor (IBA)
- List of United States Marine Corps individual equipment
- Modular lightweight load-carrying equipment (MOLLE)
