= AN/PSQ-42 =

Binocular night vision device

AN/PSQ-42 Enhanced Night Vision Goggle-Binocular
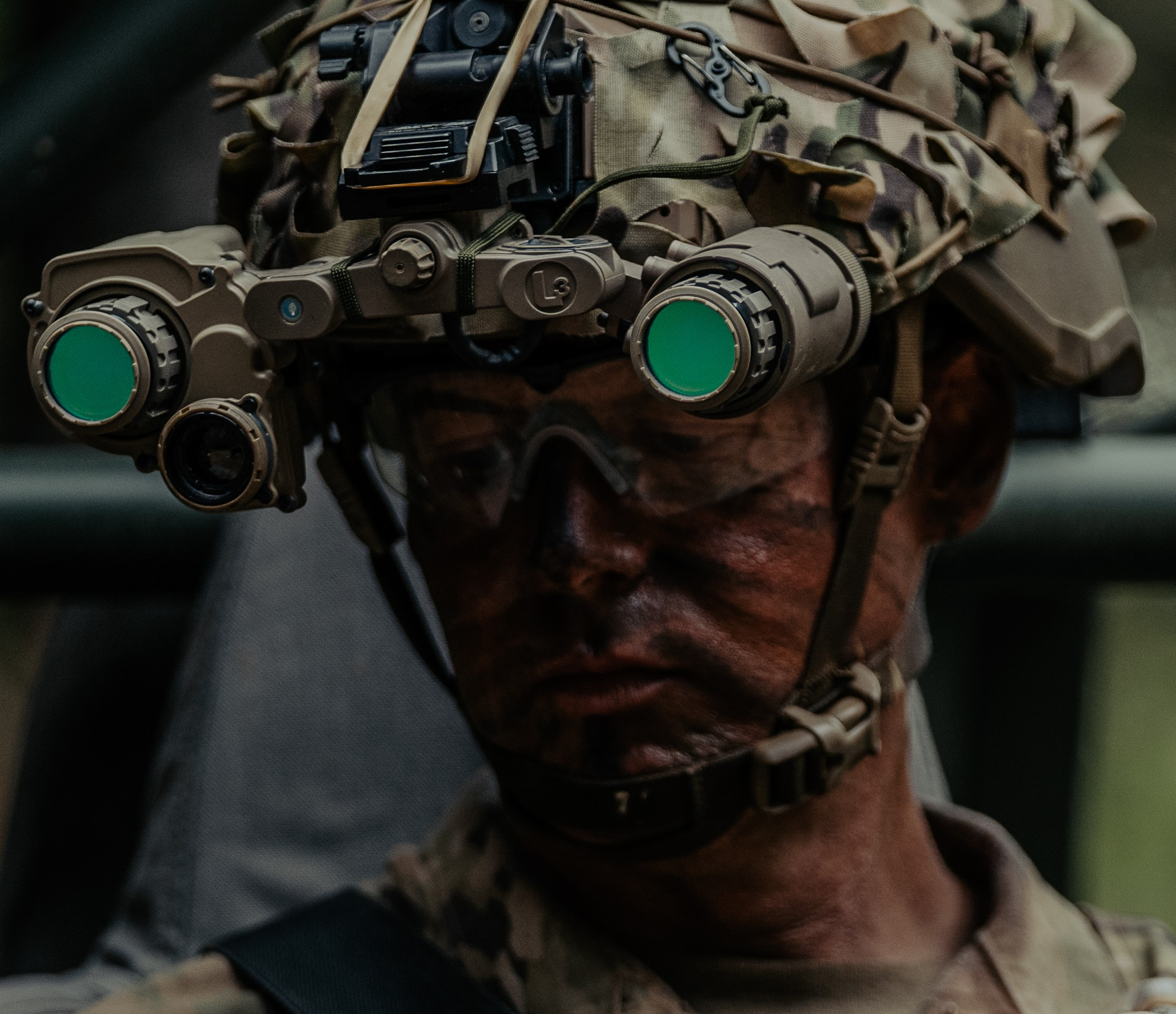
- A U.S. Army soldier wearing an IHPS helmet with ENVG-B goggles mounted and flipped up into the low-profile stow position.
- Type: Helmet mounted binocular image intensifier and thermal imager combination
- Place of origin: United States
- Category: Military

Service history
- In service: 2019–present
- Used by: U.S. Army U.S. Marine Corps Special Operations Forces (Ukraine)
- Wars: War in Afghanistan (2001–2021); Operation Inherent Resolve; Russian Invasion of Ukraine

Production history
- Designer: L3Harris and Elbit Systems of America
- Designed: 2018–2019
- Manufacturer: L3Harris; Elbit Systems of America
- No. built: >13,000 units

Specifications
- Weight: <2.5 lbs
- Battery configuration: Helmet mounted 4x AA-type battery pack

The AN/PSQ-42 Enhanced Night Vision Goggle-Binocular (ENVG-B) is a third-generation passive binocular night vision device developed for the United States Army by L3Harris. It combines dual tube image-intensifying (I²) as well as both thermal-imaging and augmented reality technologies into a single goggle, enabling vision in low-light conditions and increased soldier awareness. The two vision methods can be used individually or simultaneously in a fused mode. The ENVG-B is intended to be issued to the dismounted combat arms soldiers within the Army's Brigade combat teams (BCT), and so far over 10,000 have been issued to several BCT's within the 1st Infantry Division, 2nd Infantry Division, 25th Infantry Division, 82nd Airborne Division and 101st Airborne Division. The US Marine Corps has also purchased 3,100 ENVG-B units.

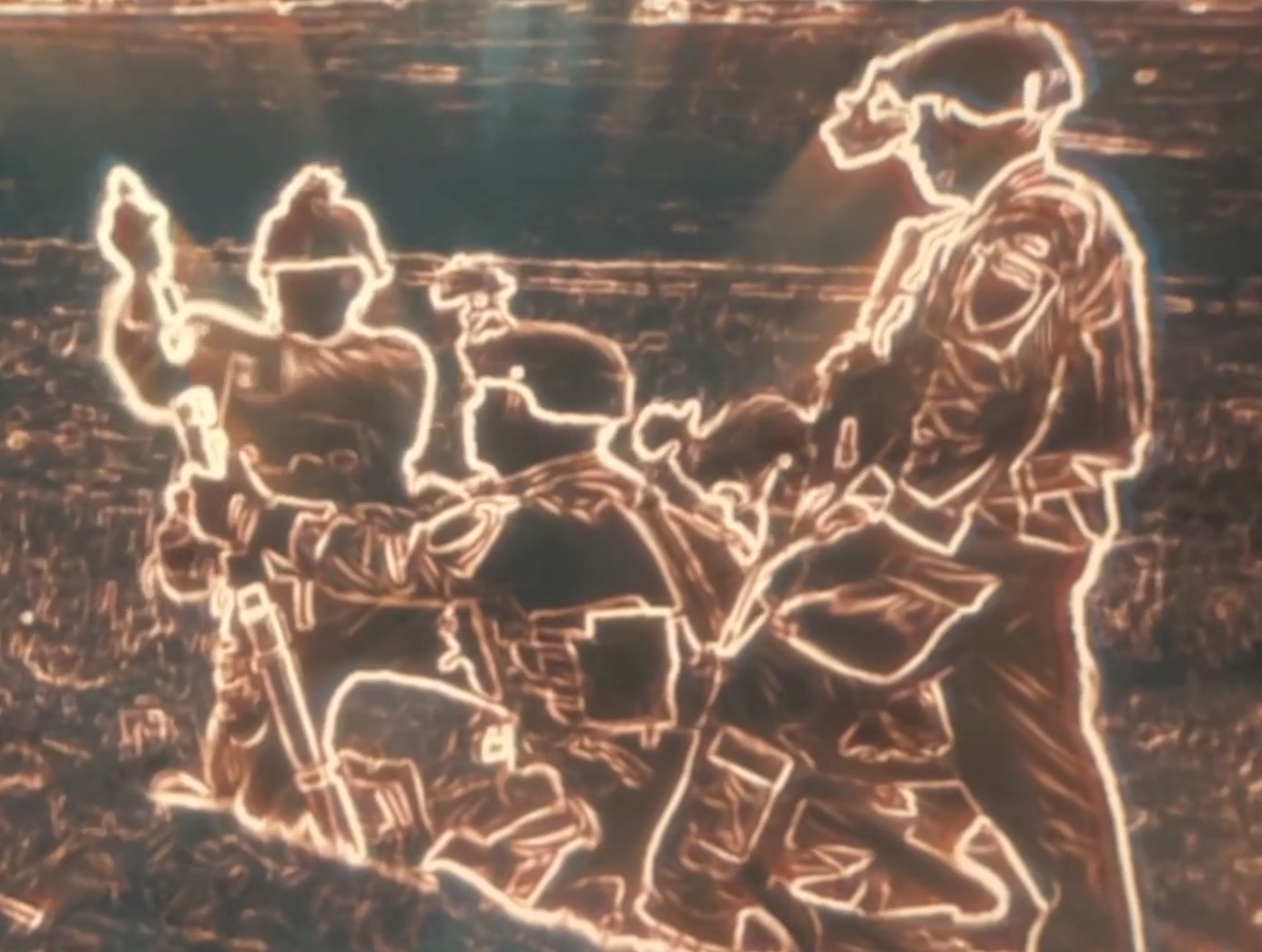
U.S. Army soldiers load an M224 60mm mortar, as seen through the ENVG-B's I² + thermal fusion outline mode

== Development ==
The ENVG-B was reported to be in development as early as 2018, intended to give soldiers better depth perception than the monocular AN/PVS-14 and AN/PSQ-20. Initial production (Directed Requirements Contract) goggles were produced with a black housing, while full rate production (Program of Record Contract) goggles are now produced in a Tan 499 housing.

In accordance with the Joint Electronics Type Designation System (JETDS), the "AN/PSQ-42" designation represents the 42nd design of an Army-Navy electronic device for portable special combination equipment. The JETDS system also now is used to name all Department of Defense electronic systems.

== Design and features ==
The AN/PSQ-42 combines two image intensification tubes with an uncooled thermal imager and is able to operate in an I²-only mode or a fusion mode that combines I² with a thermal image overlay. The overlay is also capable of displaying augmented reality data including navigational and targeting waypoints, a compass, Blue Force tracking an other imagery from a Nett Warrior device, generally an Android phone running ATAK software, and connecting to certain models of thermal weaponsight to wireless transmit a camera feed, allowing users to aim their weapon around a corner or without shouldering. The ENVG-B uses L3Harris' proprietary SuperGain image-intensification tubes, claimed to provide better image gain and brightness than previous Generation 3 image intensifier tubes. The ENVG-B can also display wirelessly transmitted weapon sight crosshair and thermal imagery from the Family of Weapon Sights-Individual (FWS-I) thermal imager mounted on a weapon. The image-intensifying tubes also allows the user to illuminate, designate, and engage targets conventionally with weapon-mounted infrared laser pointer-illuminator devices such as the AN/PEQ-15.

The entire ENVG-B assembly consists of the ENVG-B goggles themselves, Positioning Assembly (PA), Helmet Mount Assembly (HMA) and battery pack. In a fashion similar to the AN/PSQ-20 and AN/PVS-31, the ENVG-B does not receive power from a battery within the goggle housing itself (such as in the AN/PVS-14). Instead, the goggle receives power from the battery pack mounted on the rear of the soldier's helmet via a circuit that traverses the HMA and PA, with hotshoe connectors at the interface between those components. This shifts the center mass of an ENVG-B equipped helmet toward the wearer's neck, resulting in a more ergonomic balance and reducing neck strain, especially in the prone. The ENVG-B assembly can be mounted on the ACH, ECH and IHPS helmets. A special helmet cover designed to conceal the battery pack and HMA exists for these helmets.

Like the AN/PVS-31, the ENVG-B features articulation allowing the user to simply move one or both eyepieces to the side for a "low-profile stow" position while the universal mount itself allows the user to also flip the entire bridge upwards for a higher stow.

A small infrared illuminator is built into the housing for viewing handheld items like a map, weapon, or radio screen. A gain control knob is centrally mounted on the bridge of the goggle housing. Both the eyepieces and objective lenses are capable of affixing a protective sacrificial lens, and the objective lenses have removable protective rubber caps with lanyards.

== Operational history ==
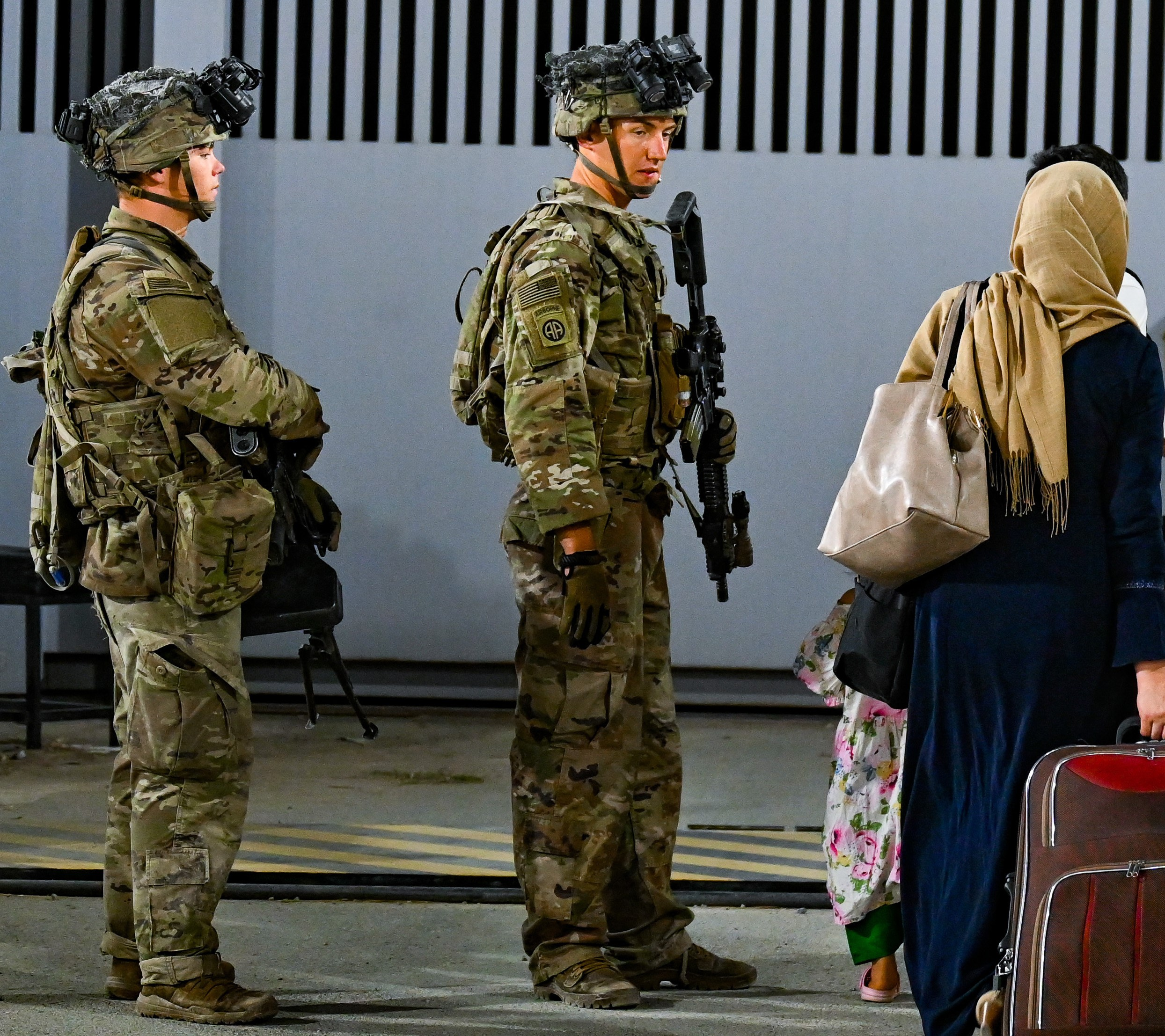
U.S. Army paratroopers from the 82nd Airborne Division during Operation Allies Refuge. Both are equipped with the ENVG-B in a high stowed position.

The ENVG-B saw its first operational use with 1st Brigade, 82nd Airborne Division during its participation in Operation Allies Refuge in August 2021.

As of January 2025, the Special Operations Forces (Ukraine) have been making use of the ENVG-B system during the Russian Invasion of Ukraine.

The US Army has an Acquisition Objective of 122,323 ENVG-B devices.

== See also ==
- List of military electronics of the United States
