= Modular Integrated Communications Helmet =

Type of U.S. combat helmet

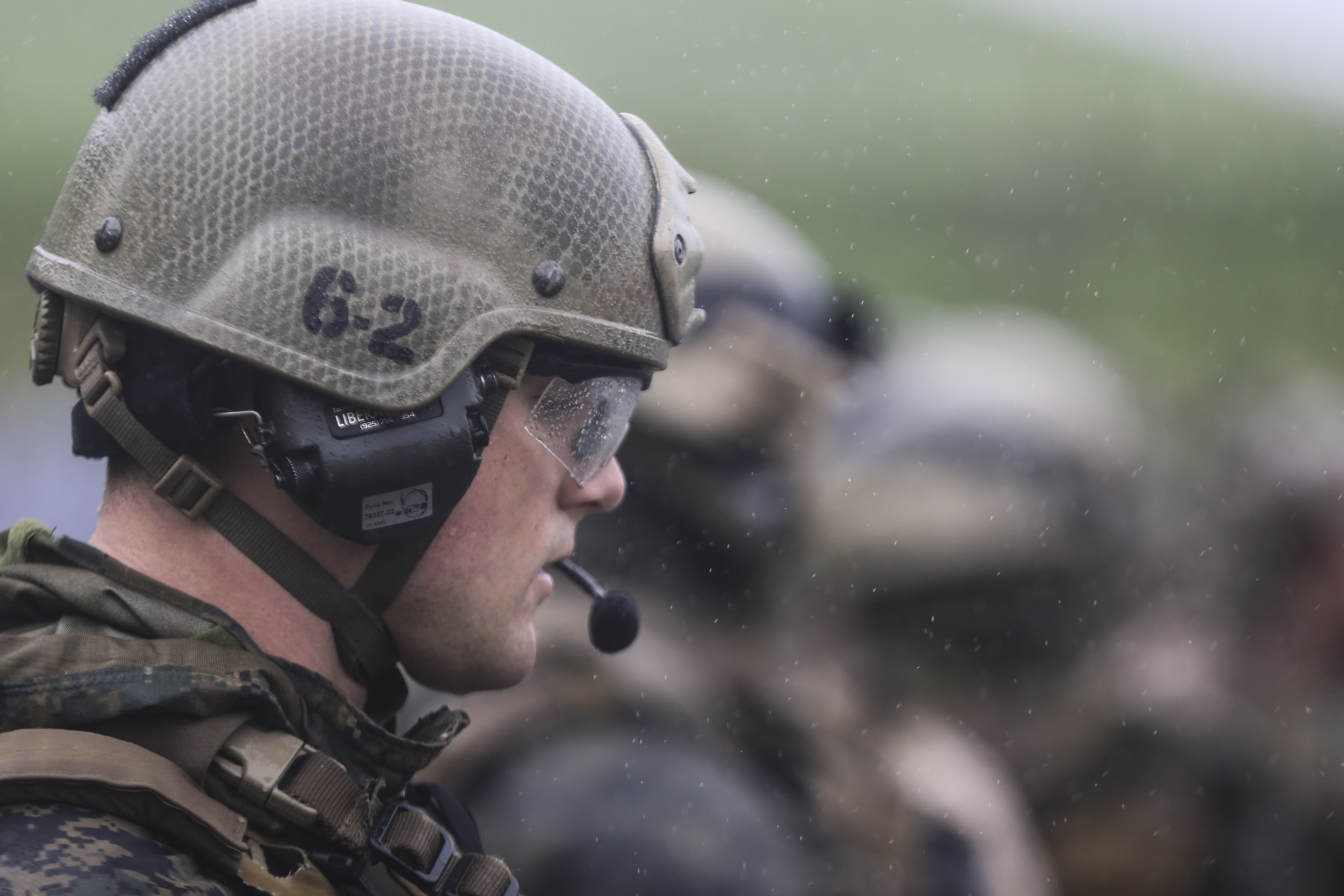
- An up-close image of a United States Marine wearing a Modular Integrated Communications Helmet
- Type: Combat helmet
- Place of origin: United States of America

Service history
- In service: January 2001 – present
- Used by: See Users
- Wars: In US service: Global war on terrorism: War in Afghanistan; Iraq war; American-led intervention in the Syrian civil war; In non-US service: Syrian civil war spillover in Lebanon; Russian invasion of Ukraine

Production history
- Designer: United States Army Soldier Systems Center
- Designed: 1997
- Manufacturer: Made by numerous manufacturers like MSA Gallet and Gentex
- Produced: January 2001 – present
- Variants: See Variants

Specifications
- Weight: 1.36 kg (3.0 lb) to 1.63 kg (3.6 lb), depending on size

The Modular Integrated Communications Helmet (MICH) is a U.S. combat helmet and one of several used by the country's military. It was developed by the United States Army Soldier Systems Center to be the next generation of protective combat helmets for use by the U.S. Army.

== History ==
The MICH was originally part of a series of combat helmets designed for the U.S. Army Special Operations Command as a replacement for the PASGT helmet and the various non-ballistic skateboard, bicycle, and whitewater "bump" helmets solely within those units. Development was done from 1997 before it was released in January 2001 by the United States Army Soldier Systems Center.

The main reason for the development of the MICH was due to the protective but heavy PASGT being supplanted by these bump helmets by special forces operators due to them being lighter, more comfortable, closer-fitting, and made of plastic making them easier to mount accessories onto, especially night vision devices and communications headsets. The lighter weight and non-ballistic nature of these helmets allowed the fitting of additional accessories without putting undue strain on the neck or requiring the drilling of holes through Kevlar to affix night vision mounting brackets, compromising the Kevlar helmet's protective ability if not done precisely. Inevitably, operators suffered injury and deaths due to taking their wholly unsuited plastic helmets into the unforgiving environment of close-quarters warfare, especially the 1993 Battle of Mogadishu where at least one Delta Force operator was killed by a shot to the head. While no ballistic helmet of the time could protect from small arms fire in close-quarters combat, it inspired the U.S. Army to create a new helmet to better protect special operations forces in direct action missions while providing the weight and modularity they desired that caused them to cease using the PASGT in the first place.

An initial stop-gap solution was provided in the RBR S4 helmet (introduced in 1994), which is difficult to find information on but appears to be derived from the French SPECTRA helmet; it particularly resembles the Canadian CG634, which is a derivative. Meanwhile, development was under way of a purpose-built helmet under the SPEAR program, which eventually produced the MICH in the late 1990s and offered in three cuts to allow operator choice in balancing protection and weight to suit their preferences and mission profile. While it did not entirely replace the plastic bump helmets, it replaced them almost completely in direct action missions where operators are most likely to suffer head injury from fragments, concussive force, or bullets. Initially, it was used almost exclusively by SOCOM and some units with close ties to them; however, the U.S. Army later determined that the improvements presented by the lighter, higher-cut, and brim-less MICH over the PASGT helmet warranted organization-wide distribution, and began to release examples to the Army at large as a more cost-effective solution to reequipping the entire Army.

To date, the MICH and its derivatives, the Advanced Combat Helmet and Enhanced Combat Helmet have fully replaced the PASGT in active U.S. Army service and is in use with all branches of the U.S. military in at least some capacity.

The U.S. Marine Corps evaluated the MICH during its own search for a PASGT replacement, but chose to adopt a helmet that retains the profile of the PASGT but is lighter, known as the Lightweight Helmet, which incorporates improvements in the MICH such as the liner and retention system.

On June 12, 2016, officers of the Orlando Police Department SWAT team engaged a gunman at the Pulse nightclub who had attacked the club and taken hostages. During the engagement, one of the officers took a shot to the head, the round impacting the officer's MICH TC-2002 helmet and saving his life. The helmet remains on display at Orlando PD headquarters to this day.

== Design ==
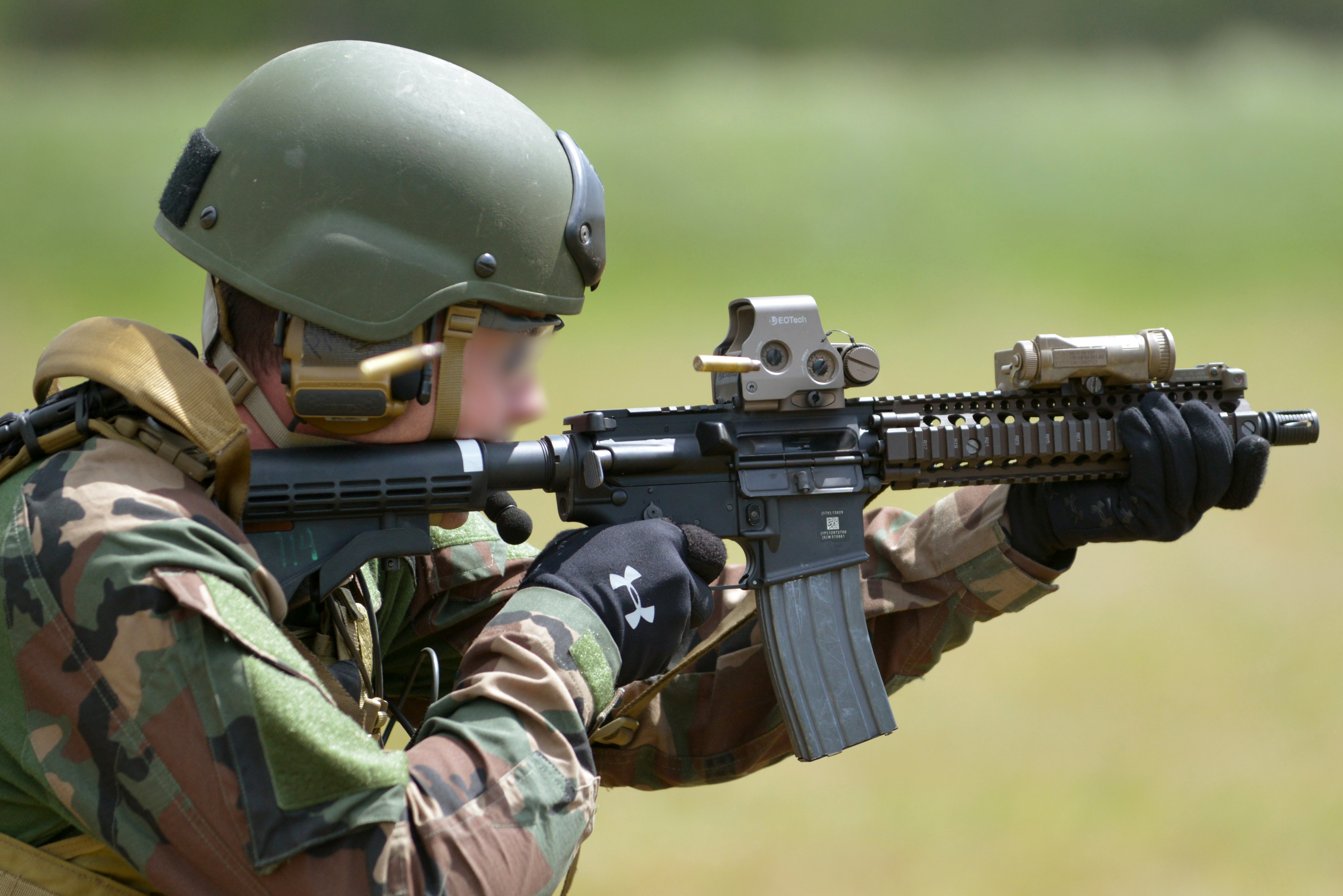
A U.S. Marine CSO practices firing his MK18 at the Grafenwoehr Training Area's shooting range.

The MICH ranges in weight from about 3 lb (1.36 kg) (size medium) to just over 3.6 lb (1.63 kg) (extra large). It uses a new, more advanced type of Kevlar and provides increased protection against handgun rounds.

A pad system and four-point retention system, similar to the cushions and straps found on the aforementioned skate, bicycle, and water helmets, replaces the nylon cord suspension system, sweatband and chinstrap found on the PASGT helmet. The change provides greater impact protection and comfort for the wearer. It can be fitted with a mounting bracket for a night vision device on the front, such as the AN/PVS-14 or AN/PVS-15, similar to that on the PASGT helmet. It can also be fitted with a pair of straps on the rear to keep protective eyewear in place, as well as cloth helmet covers in varying camouflage patterns including M81 Woodland, three-color desert, USMC MARPAT, U.S. Army UCP, Crye's MultiCam, and solid black for use with SWAT teams, among numerous other patterns available commercially. As with its PASGT predecessor, the MICH is often worn with a band around it which features a pair of "cat eyes"—patches, some purely reflective and some also slightly luminous, on the back intended to prevent friendly fire incidents.

The MICH is also slightly smaller than the PASGT, providing 8% less coverage; this is primarily in the elimination of the brow and raising of the sides to the point that the lower brim behind the temple is "flat", compared to the "curved" profile of the PASGT. This accounts for some of the reduced weight and allows for both greater situational awareness and less obstruction of the wearer's vision, particularly when combined with Interceptor Body Armor.

Previously, soldiers had complained that the high collar of the Interceptor combined with the two-point chinstrap pushed the back of the PASGT helmet forward, in turn moving the helmet brim over their eyes when they attempted to fire from a prone position, this is rectified in the MICH with its reduced profile and four-point chinstrap.

== Variants ==
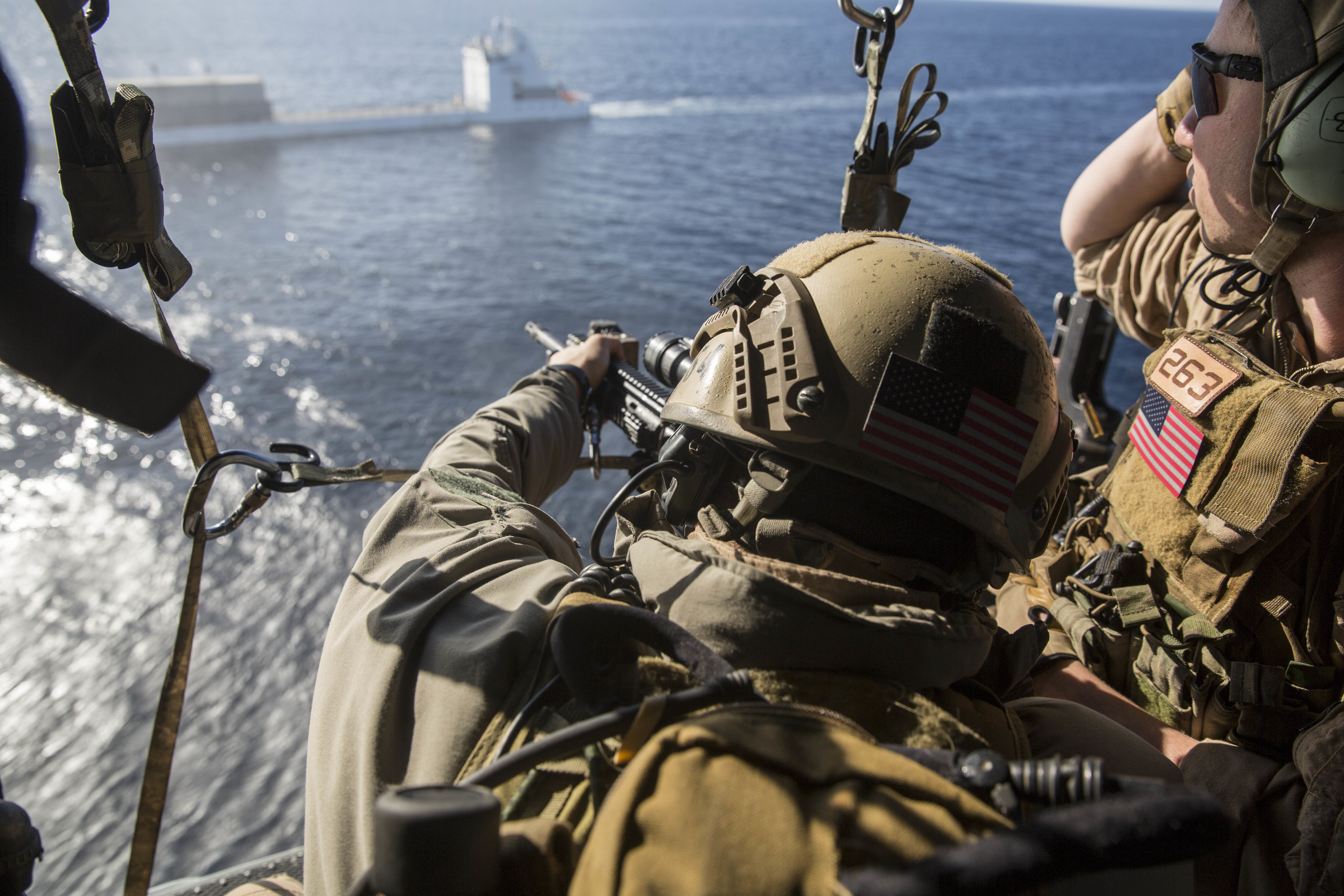
U.S. Marines with the 15th Marine Expeditionary Unit's Maritime Raid Force practice maritime interoperability training.

=== MICH TC-2000 ===
The baseline "full cut" helmet, which has a four-point chin strap and seven pads worn inside.

=== MICH TC-2001 ===
The second cut known as "high cut", which removes all ear protection allowing for more headset options at the cost of all side protection.

=== MICH TC-2002 ===
The third cut known "gunfighter cut", which raises the area around the ears by about 1/2", allowing for a wider range of headsets to be used and roughly meeting the profile of the skateboard and whitewater helmets previously used by special forces.

=== Advanced Combat Helmet ===
The Advanced Combat Helmet is derived from the MICH in terms of design, but offers superior protection.

=== Enhanced Combat Helmet ===
The Enhanced Combat Helmet is identical in shape to the Advanced Combat Helmet but thicker and made with lighter materials. It is set to replace LWH in use by the United States Marine Corps and the ACH and MICH 2000 helmets of the U.S Army, Air Force, and Navy. The ECH itself is in the process of being replaced by the Integrated Head Protection System helmet in US Army service.

== Users ==
=== Current ===
- Afghanistan: Currently used by IEA Special Forces.
- Algeria: Used by the Algerian special forces.
- Belarus: MICH 2000 helmets with Izlom helmet covers said to be used by OCAM units under the State Border Committee of the Republic of Belarus.
- Bangladesh: Used by Bangladesh Army 1st Para Commando Battalion, Crisis Response Team of Bangladesh Police, 41 Squadron of Bangladesh Air Force.
- Brazil: MICH 2000 variant with aftermarket side rails, used by North jungle warfare units of the Brazilian Army
- Canada: MICH 2000 and its variants in use by CANSOFCOM.
- Chile: MICH 2000. Standard helmet for telecommunication and medical units.
- Czech Republic: Small number used in the Czech military.
- Georgia: Bullet-resistant analogue DH MK-II made by STC Delta as standard-issue helmet for the Georgian Defence Forces.
- Germany: German-made and South African-made MICH 2001 used by German Kommando Spezialkräfte (KSK) Special Forces. Bundeswehr paratroopers use the MICH 2000-style "Airborne 828" helmet and the MICH 2001-style "Airborne 828 Tactical Cut" helmet by Schuberth GmbH. Schuberth also make a standard MICH 2000 helmet.
- Greece: Used by the Hellenic Army
- Indonesia: Standard issue helmet for the 3 branches of the Indonesian National Armed Forces.
- Iraq: Used by Iraqi special forces commandos.
- Israel: Used by Israeli special forces units alongside Ops-Core helmets.
- Lebanon: Used by the Lebanese Marine Commando regiment and the Lebanese Commando Regiment and the Air Assault Regiment. Also used by the Internal Security Forces (police) elite force.
- Netherlands: Known to be used by the Korps Commandotroepen in Afghanistan.
- North Macedonia: Used by the Army of North Macedonia.
- Pakistan: Used by Pakistan Armed Forces.
- Romania: Used by Detașamentul Căutare Salvare în Luptă (DCSL) special forces detachment of the Romanian Air Force.
- Russia: MICH 2000 helmets known to be in use by the SVR special forces group "Zaslon."
- Serbia: Mile Dragic-made MICH 2002 helmets used by Serbian Gendarmerie and in the army by scouts and special forces.
- South Korea: Both MICH and ACH are worn by KATUSA units. Some MICH-2001 helmets are worn by ROKNSWF. A South Korean copy of ACH like KCI-105 helmets are worn by ROK Army, Navy and Air Force.
- United Kingdom: Some MICH TC-2000 helmets used by the SAS and Special Forces Support Group.
- United States: Some MICH TC-2000/2001-type helmets used by the United States Marine Corps Forces Special Operations Command alongside Ops-Core made FAST helmets and in some Marine expeditionary and Force Recon units. Was used by the U.S. Air Force Security Forces (replaced by Team Wendy EXFIL helmets). Was used by 75th Ranger Regiment (replaced by Ops-Core FAST Maritime by 2013/14, Navy SEALs (replaced by Ops-Core LBH), Green Berets. Delta Force utilized the TC-2002 model, and some members the TC-2001, until it was replaced by the Crye Precision AirFrame helmet by late 2010; however, this transition was short lived, and the unit adopted the Future Assault Shell Technology helmet in the mid-2010s.
- Vietnam: The Vietnamese military introduced copies of the MICH-2000 helmets for standard infantry units and Special Forces.

=== Former ===
- Australia: Replaced in service by the EXFIL Ballistic helmet and the Tiered Combat Helmet. was Used by the Australian Defence Force and special forces units.
- Islamic Republic of Afghanistan: Used by Crisis Response Unit 222.
- United States: Replaced in mainstream service by the ACH in U.S. Army service and by the LWH in USMC service, in turn both to be replaced by the ECH.

== See also ==
- Fallschirmjäger version Stahlhelm - This type of helmet's chinstrap featured a four-point retention system that has come into use again by modern combat helmets such as the MICH.
- Personnel Armor System for Ground Troops Helmet
- Headgear of the United States Army
