= AN/PVS-14 =

Monocular night vision device

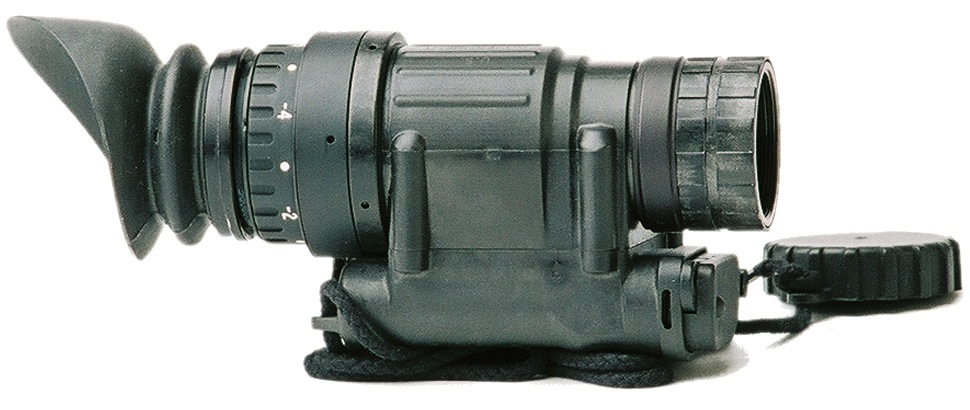
- An AN/PVS-14 night vision device.
- Place of origin: United States
- Category: Head-mountable

Service history
- In service: 2000–present
- Used by: British Armed Forces; Canadian Armed Forces; Hellenic Armed Forces; Portuguese Armed Forces; Ukrainian Armed Forces; United States Armed Forces
- Wars: Global war on terrorism

Production history
- Designed: 2000
- Manufacturer: Elbit Systems of America (previously ITT); L3Harris Technologies (previously Litton)
- No. built: > 500,000+
- Variants: AN/PVS-14 (ITT F6015, Litton M914A); NEPVS-14, PVS-14D

Specifications
- Weight: 351 grams
- Dimensions (L×H×W): 4.5 inches (l) × 2.25 inches (h) × 2 inches (w)
- Adapter: Bayonet
- Battery configuration: Onboard battery, 1 AA
- Resolution (lp/mm): >64 lp/mm
- II tube: MX-11769
- Tube form factor: 12 mm
- Field of vision (°): 40°
- Range of detection: 350 m (starlight)
- Range of recognition: 300 m (starlight)
- Generation: 3
- Can use these tubes: ITT F9815
- Dioptric adjustments: +4D to −6D

The AN/PVS-14 Monocular Night Vision Device (MNVD) is in widespread use by the United States Armed Forces as well as NATO allies around the world. It uses a third generation image intensifier tube, and is primarily manufactured by Litton Industries (now L-3 Warrior Systems) and Elbit Systems of America (formerly Harris Night Vision, formerly Exelis, formerly ITT). It is often used 'hands free' using a head harness or attached to a combat helmet such as the PASGT, MICH TC-2000 Combat Helmet, Advanced Combat Helmet, Marine Lightweight Helmet or IHPS. It can also be used as a weapon's night sight. In addition, it was part of the equipment fielded in the U.S. Army's Land Warrior program. Morovision Night Vision was the law enforcement distributor of the NEPVS-14 for ITT.

In accordance with the Joint Electronics Type Designation System (JETDS), the "AN/PVS-14" designation represents the 14th design of an Army-Navy electronic device for portable visual detection equipment. The JETDS system also now is used to name all Department of Defense electronic systems.

== Example specifications ==
- Film: Thin-film
- Gate: Auto-gated
- Brightness gain: Adjustable from 25 to more than 3000 fL/fc
- Magnification: 1×
- Objective lens: f/1.2
- Eyepiece lens: EFL 26 mm
- Diopter adjustment: +2 to −6
- Range of focus: 25 cm to infinity
- Voltage required: 1.5 Volts
- Operating temperature: −51 °C to +49 °C
- Storage temperature: −51 °C to +49 °C

== See also ==
- AN/PVS-7
- AN/PSQ-20
- List of military electronics of the United States
