= Integrated Head Protection System =

US Army combat helmet

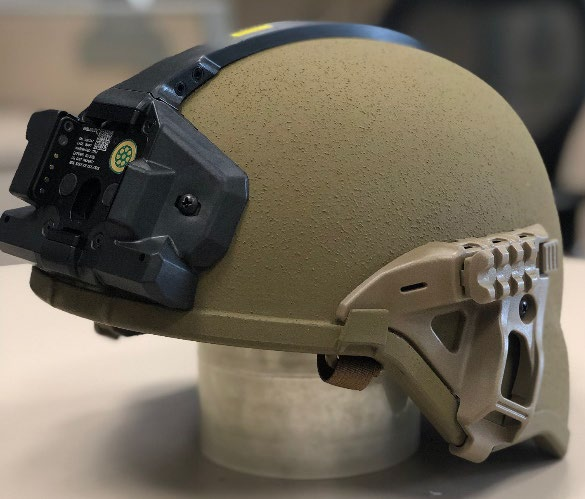
- IHPS helmet with the AN/PSQ-42 ENVG-B Helmet Mount Assembly
- Type: Combat helmet
- Place of origin: United States

Service history
- In service: 2019–present
- Used by: U.S. Army
- Wars: Global War on Terrorism; War in Afghanistan; Operation Resolute Support; Operation Inherent Resolve

Production history
- Manufacturer: Avon Protection | Ceradyne 3M
- Produced: 2019–present
- No. produced: over 119,000

Specifications
- Weight: Size Medium: approx. 3 lbs/1.36 kg

The Integrated Head Protection System (IHPS) is the United States Army's newest combat helmet, intended to eventually replace the Advanced Combat Helmet and Enhanced Combat Helmet.

It was developed by the US Army PEO Soldier's Soldier Protection System (SPS) program, and is produced by Avon Protection Ceradyne, a subsidiary of Avon Protection.

The helmet was first issued in 2019 to troops deploying to combat zones in Afghanistan, Iraq, and Syria. Between 2018 and 2022, the Army issued an estimated 119,000 IHPS helmets to soldiers.

== History ==
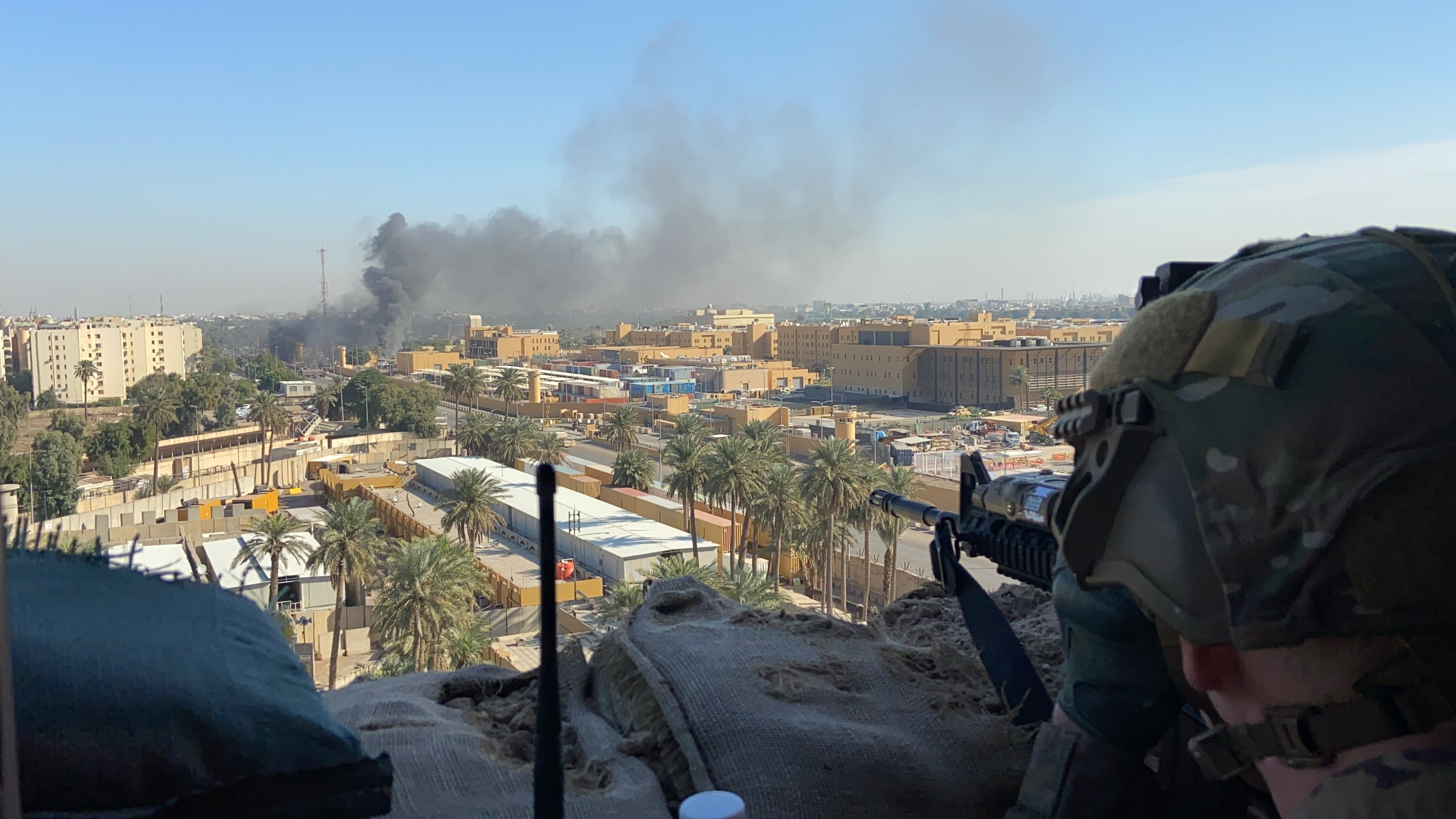
U.S. Army's 25th Infantry Division soldiers wearing the IHPS during the 2019–20 attack on the U.S. embassy in Baghdad.

The IHPS helmet began development as a replacement for the Advanced Combat Helmets and Enhanced Combat Helmets in 2013 under the U.S. Army's Soldier Protection System program, which is intended to improve soldier protection and performance while reducing weight of a soldier's Personal Protective Equipment (PPE). Low Rate Initial Production delivery began the second quarter of the 2018 fiscal year. The helmet was first issued to troops deploying to combat zones through the Rapid Fielding Initiative (RFI) program.

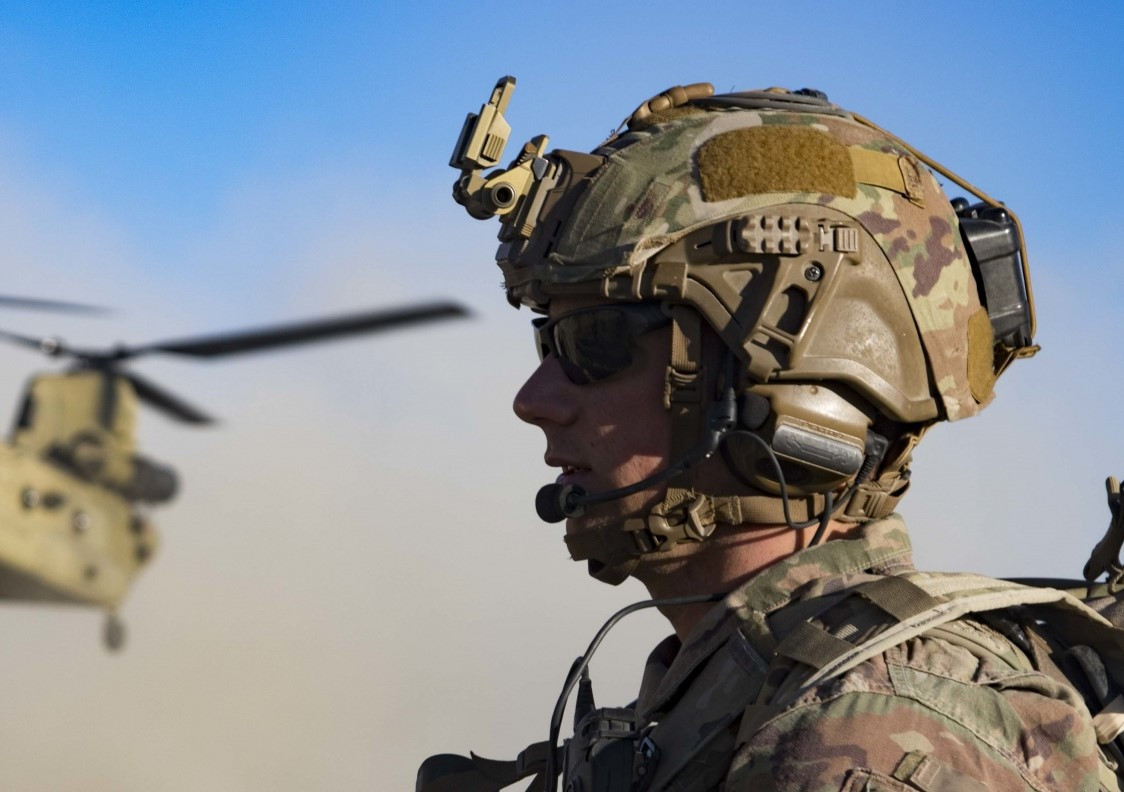
A U.S. Army Sergeant in the 82nd Airborne Division deployed in Afghanistan in 2019 wearing the IHPS with a communications headset.

In October 2019 the new helmet's attachable mandible was reported to have saved a soldier’s life in Afghanistan, protecting his neck from a brick thrown at his vehicle.

The IHPS was deployed with the U.S. Army's 25th Infantry Division soldiers during the 2019–20 attack on the U.S. embassy in Baghdad.

In February 2024, the US Army began fielding the Next Generation IHPS (NG IHPS), which protects against rifle rounds while maintaining the same weight profile. Fielding began with the 82nd Airborne Division and is projected to be issued to the 101st Airborne Division by the end of 2024. The Army plans to issue 190,000 NG IHPS helmets by 2028.

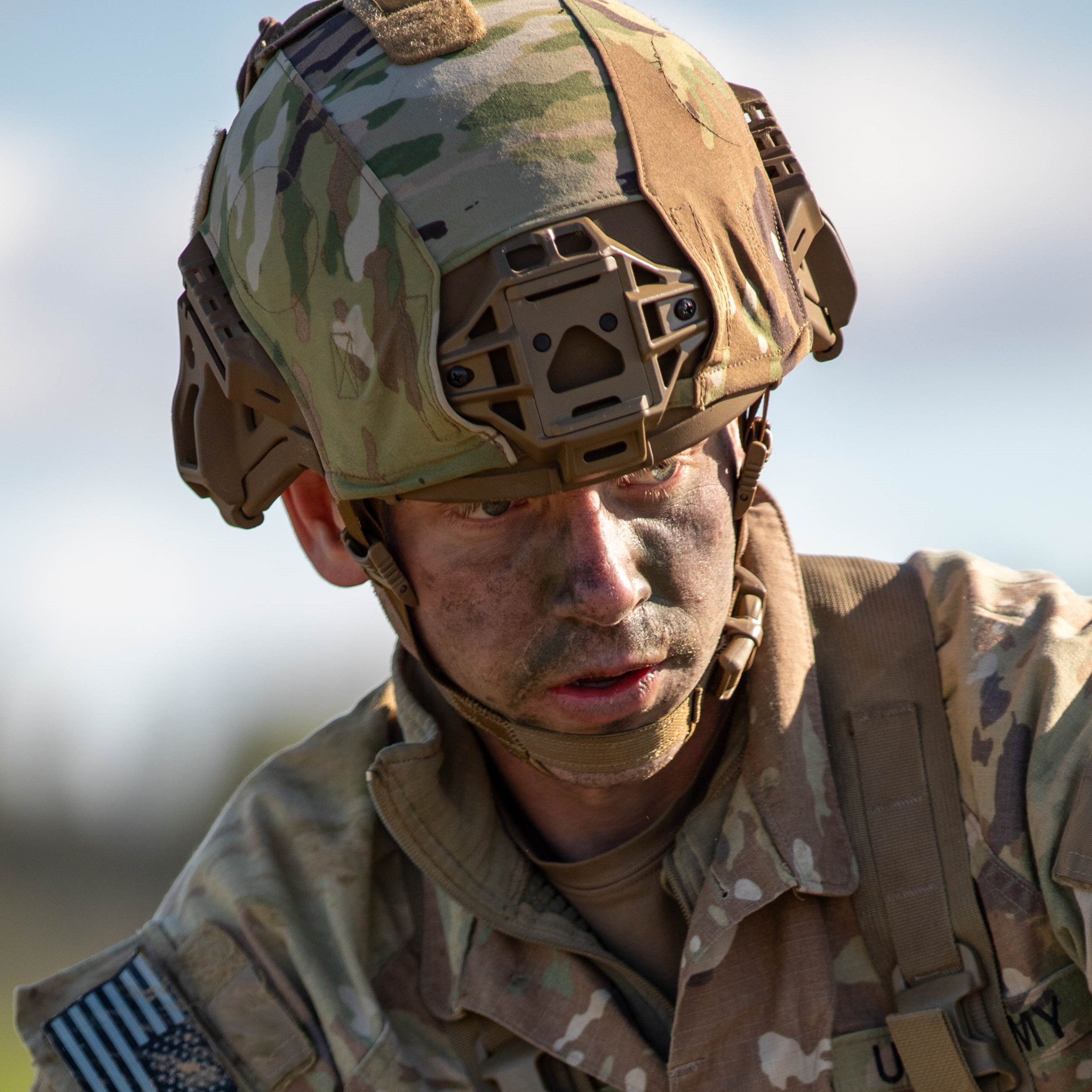
The Next Generation IHPS can be identified by its larger three bolt night vision baseplate, as opposed to the single bolt baseplate of the original IHPS.

== Design ==
The IHPS, combined with Military Combat Eye Protection (MCEP), completes the head protection portion of the Soldier Protection System. The IHPS is claimed to be 5% lighter than previous helmets, while offering improved blunt force impact, passive hearing and ballistic protection. An optional 2 lb/.9 kg applique armor plate is available for further improved ballistic protection. The original IHPS protects against pistol-fired projectiles and fragmentation, while the Next Generation IHPS increases protection to rifle-fired projectiles. The IHPS comes in small, medium, large and extra large sizes. The IHPS uses a boltless chinstrap retention system, unlike previous helmets that needed pre drilled holes for bolts that fastened the chinstrap to the helmet, which created ballistic weakpoints. The IHPS has an optional mandible with eye shield for maxillofacial protection, and side rails for attaching equipment like flashlights, cameras and helmet mounted headsets. Both the legacy AN/PVS-14 and AN/PSQ-20 night vision devices can be mounted, as well as the new AN/PSQ-42 ENVG-B. The IHPS comes issued with a basic night vision baseplate and OCP helmet cover.

In late 2021, Avon Protection Ceradyne announced the completed development of a proprietary rail-mounted adapter for 3M-produced Peltor ComTac headsets, likely in response to the common complaint among troops that the helmet previously lacked the communications integration capabilities that are quickly becoming the norm with the rising popularity of high-cut style helmets.

== Users ==
- United States: United States Army.
