= Combat helmet =

Military head protection

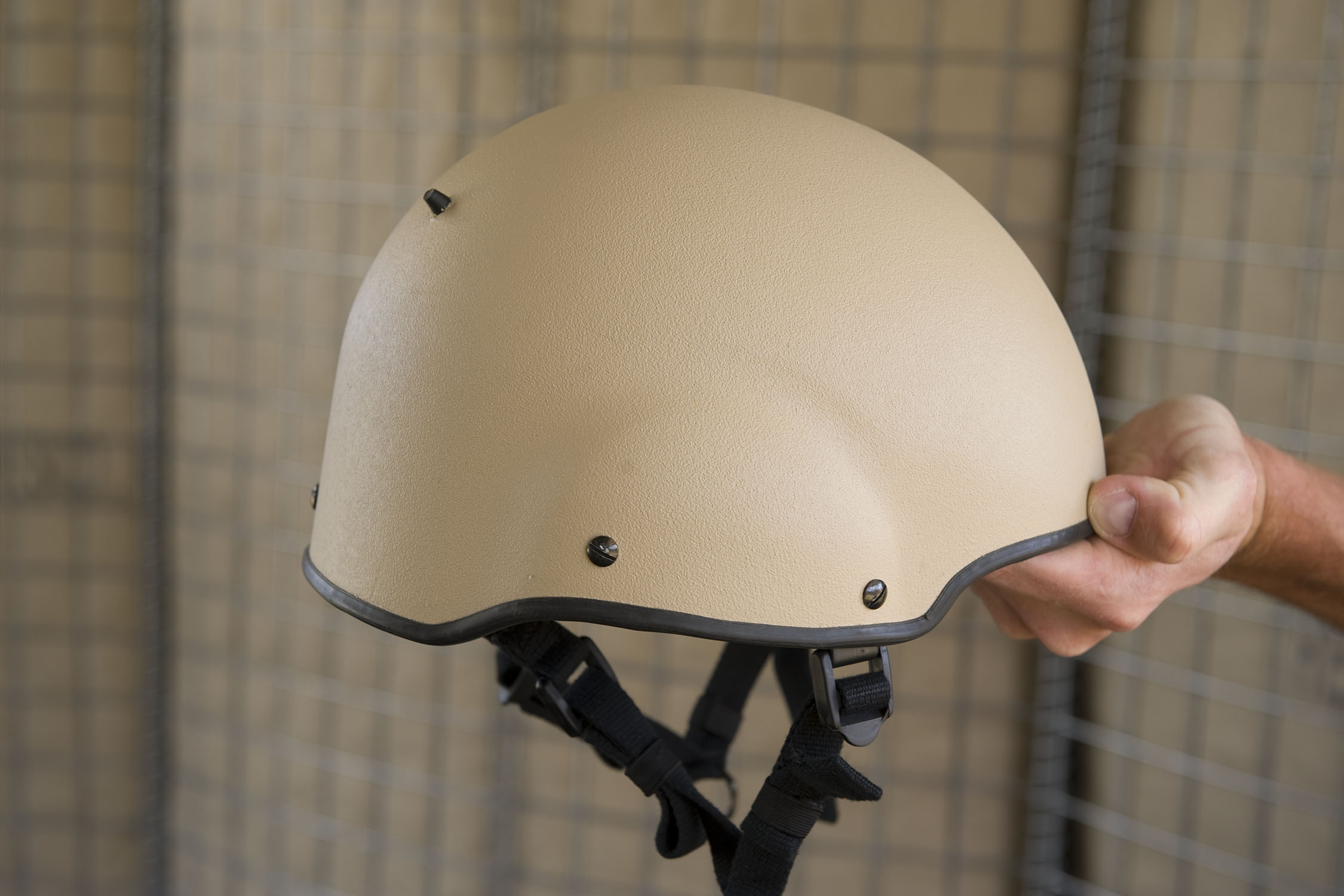
A modern example, the British Mark VII combat helmet.

A combat helmet, also called a ballistic helmet, battle helmet, or helmet system (for some modular accessory-centric designs) is a type of helmet designed to serve as a piece of body armor intended to protect the wearer's head during combat.

Helmets designed for warfare are among the earliest types of headgear to be developed and worn by humans, with examples found in several societies worldwide, the earliest of which date as far back as the Bronze Age. Most early combat helmets were designed to protect against close-range strikes, thrown objects, and low-velocity projectiles. By the Middle Ages, helmets that protected the entire head were common elements of plate armor sets. The development of firearms, cannons, and explosive weaponry rendered armor intended to protect against enemy attack largely obsolete, but lightweight helmets remained for identification and basic protection purposes into the late 19th and early 20th centuries, when developments in modern warfare saw a renaissance of combat helmets designed to protect against shrapnel, debris, and some small-caliber firearm munitions. Since the late 20th and early 21st centuries, helmets have evolved to protect against explosion shock waves and provide a mounting point for devices and accessories such as night-vision goggles and communications equipment.

== History ==
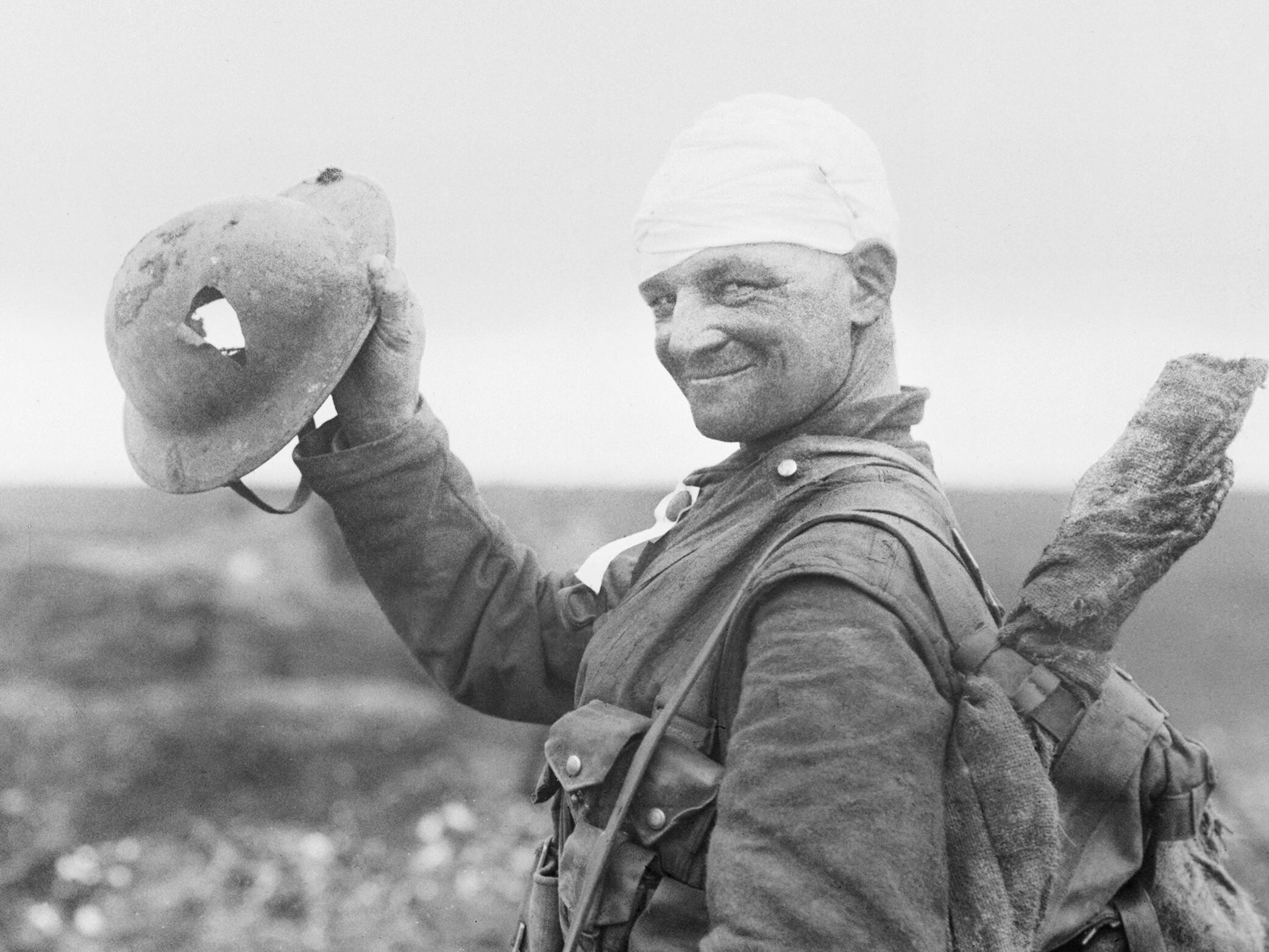
A British soldier, with a bandaged head wound, showing off the Brodie helmet that saved his life (December 1916)

Helmets are among the oldest forms of personal protective equipment and are known to have been worn by the Akkadians and Sumerians in the 23rd century BCE, Mycenaean Greeks since the 17th century BCE, the Assyrians around 900 BCE, the ancient Greeks and Romans, throughout the Middle Ages, and up to the end of the 17th century by many combatants. Their materials and construction became more advanced as weapons did. Initially constructed from leather and brass, and then bronze and iron during the Bronze and Iron Ages, they soon came to be made entirely from forged steel in many societies after about 950. At that time, they were purely military equipment, protecting the head from cutting blows with swords, arrows, and low-velocity musketry. Iron helmets were used by the cavalry of the Mali Empire to protect the cavalrymen and their mount.

Military use of helmets declined after 1670, and rifled firearms ended their use by foot soldiers after 1700, but the Napoleonic era saw ornate cavalry helmets reintroduced for cuirassiers and dragoons in some armies which continued to be used by French forces as late as 1915.

During the French Revolutionary Wars and the Napoleonic Wars, the Austrian Imperial Army saw extensive usage of helmets. In the line infantry, mainly within the fusilier companies, helmets were worn from 1798 to 1806, which was true even for officers. Although they were officially replaced by the shako in 1806, most line infantry regiments continued to wear helmets up until the Austrian defeat at Battle of Wagram in July 1809. Dragoons and cuirassiers also wore the helmets more extensively than the line infantry, with them continuing to wear them well past the Napoleonic Wars.

World War I and its increased use of artillery renewed the need for steel helmets, with the French Adrian helmet, the British Brodie helmet, and the German Stahlhelm being the first modern steel combat helmets used on the battlefield. Such helmets offered protection for the head from shrapnel and fragments. Use of these steel pot helmets continued into and after World War II, with the introduction of improved steel helmets such as the American M1 helmet, the British Mk III helmet, and the Soviet SSh-39 and SSh-40. During and shortly after the war, combat helmets began to be issued with helmet covers to offer greater camouflage. There have been two main types of covers, mesh nets to mount foliage and camouflage cloth covers to match uniforms, the latter proving to be far more popular.

Changes in military technology and warfare during the Cold War led to new developments in combat helmets, as the older World War II-era steel helmets proved to be increasingly inadequate and obsolete against new weapons and environments. Starting in the 1970s and 1980s, new materials such as Kevlar and Twaron began replacing steel as the primary material for combat helmets that were redesigned to improve weight reduction, head protection (particularly against traumatic brain injury from shock waves), and overall comfort. Original helmets produced from such efforts, such as the American Personnel Armor System for Ground Troops, were major improvements from mid-20th century designs but still largely lacked capabilities for user customization and accessory mounting, which became increasingly relevant into the 21st century. Reflecting these needs, as well as experiences from the war on terror, many 21st century combat helmets have been adapted for modern warfare requirements with improved protection, lightweight designs, and STANAG rails to act as a platform for mounting cameras, video cameras, and VAS shrouds for mounting night-vision devices.

== Types ==
=== Enclosed helmet ===
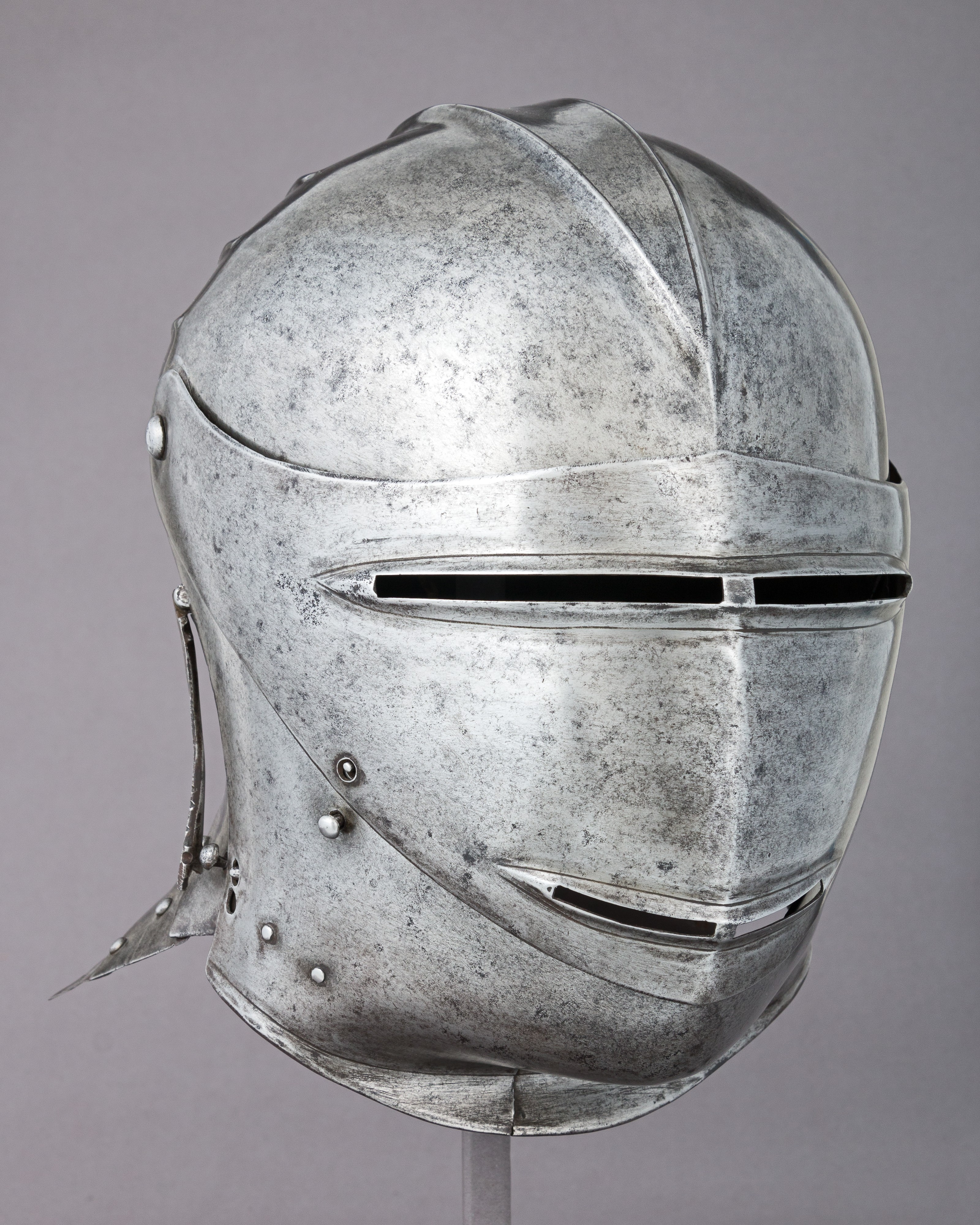
An Austrian medieval close helmet, an example of an enclosed helmet

An enclosed helmet is a combat helmet that covers the entire head. Similar to a full face or modular motorcycle helmet, enclosed helmets are intended to protect the whole head and sometimes also the neck from being struck by enemies. The front of the helmet usually either exposes just the eyes or also reveals the nose and mouth, though numerous examples have a visor serve as the front of the helmet that can be raised and lowered when necessary.

Enclosed helmets were common in the pre-modern era and were sometimes used to protect important combatants such as high-class warriors (e.g. knights) or high-ranking military leaders, such as the Corinthian helmet, close helmet, great helm, and frog-mouth helm. As the penetrative power and impact force of modern firearm rounds made face armor largely obsolete, there are very few examples of modern enclosed helmets, most of which are riot helmets with polycarbonate face shields used by law enforcement, though some use metal visors such as the Altyn, while aftermarket helmet accessories exist that add rigid metal protective plates to the front of modern helmets (often making them vaguely resemble a barbute).

=== Bowl helmet ===
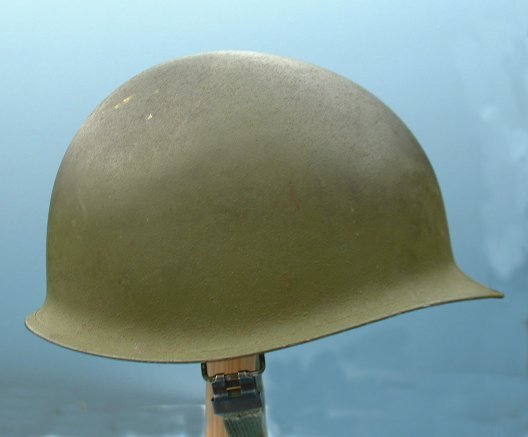
An American M1 helmet shell, an example of a bowl helmet

A bowl helmet, steel helmet, or skullcap helmet is a combat helmet that covers just the top half, and sometimes also the back of, the head, akin to a half helmet. Some may also extend to the ears or nape, but in general, most of the head below the forehead, including the entire face and neck, is left visible and unprotected. Historically, these were used to provide basic protection against strikes and projectiles, and types developed since the 20th century are designed to protect against debris, shrapnel, and some firearm rounds.

Bowl helmets are arguably the most basic and common combat helmets, with examples existing throughout history, including the Imperial helmet, Montefortino helmet, bascinet, jingasa, lobster-tailed pot helmet, kettle hat, sallet, spangenhelm, dragoon helmet, secrete, and Pickelhaube. Modern bowl helmets, made primarily of steel with internal liners (and thus contemporarily called steel helmets), were developed during and after World War I and World War II, and include the Brodie helmet, Adrian helmet, Stahlhelm, wz. 31, SSh-36, M1 helmet, Mk III helmet, SSh-39 and SSh-40, Mk IV helmet, SSh-68, Bangtan Helmet, and M59/85.

=== Low-cut helmet ===
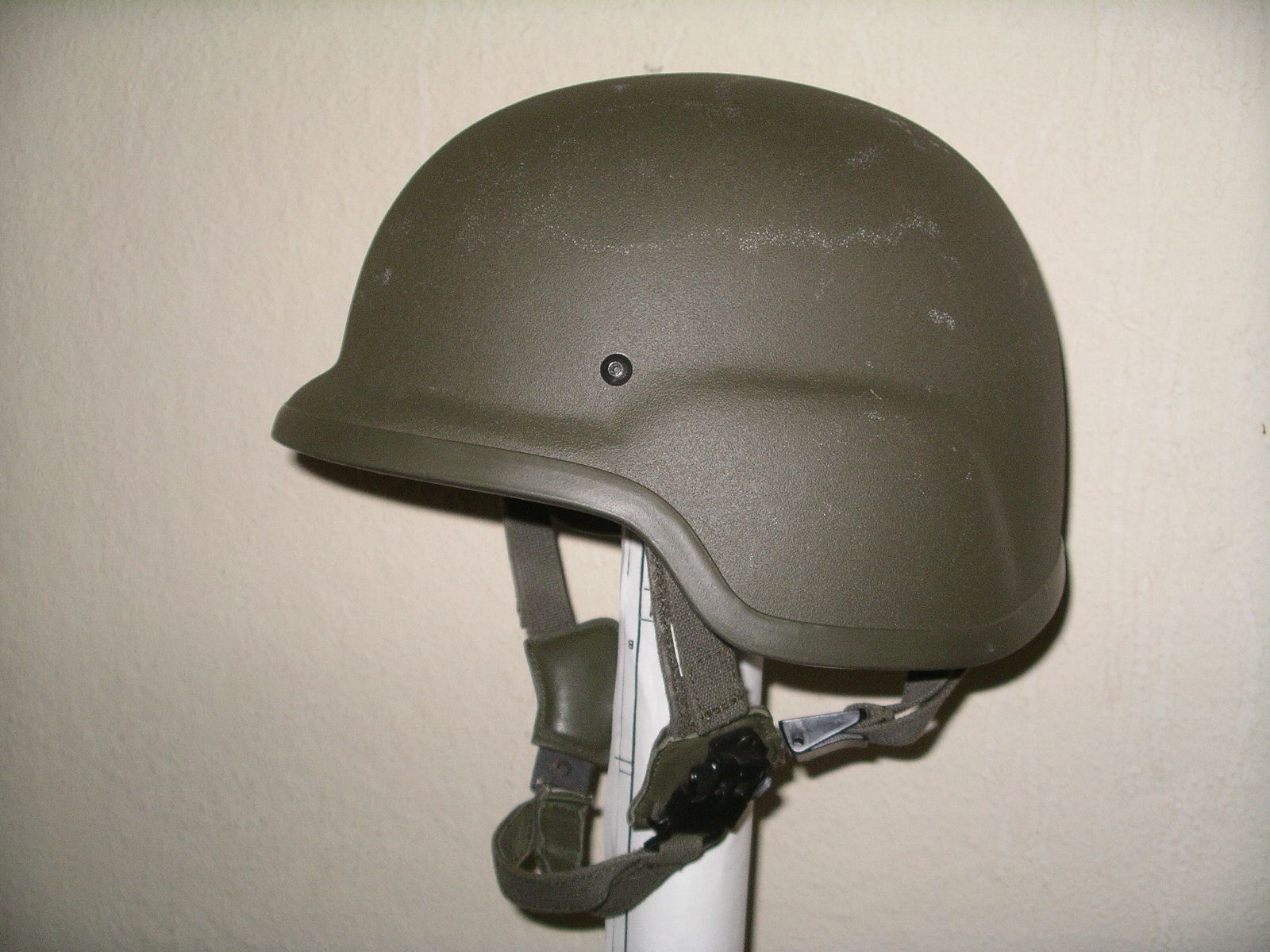
A Danish M96 (SPECTRA) helmet, an example of a low-cut helmet

A low-cut helmet or full-cut helmet is a combat helmet that covers the ears, sides, and back of the head. Their most distinct feature is generally their built-in ear covers, with a distinct outward jut where the ears roughly are. They can somewhat resemble mid-20th century bowl helmets, but have noticeably more coverage and better ballistic materials suited for modern combat. Since the 21st century, many low-cut helmets have been equipped with rail integration systems, and the ear covers in newer models have been expanded to make space for headsets.

Low-cut helmets were first popularized in the 1980s and include the PASGT helmet, Mk 6 helmet, Mk 7 helmet, SPECTRA helmet, CG634, Hełm wz. 2000, MICH TC-2000, Advanced Combat Helmet, Lightweight Helmet, 6B47 helmet, and QGF-03.

=== High-cut helmet ===
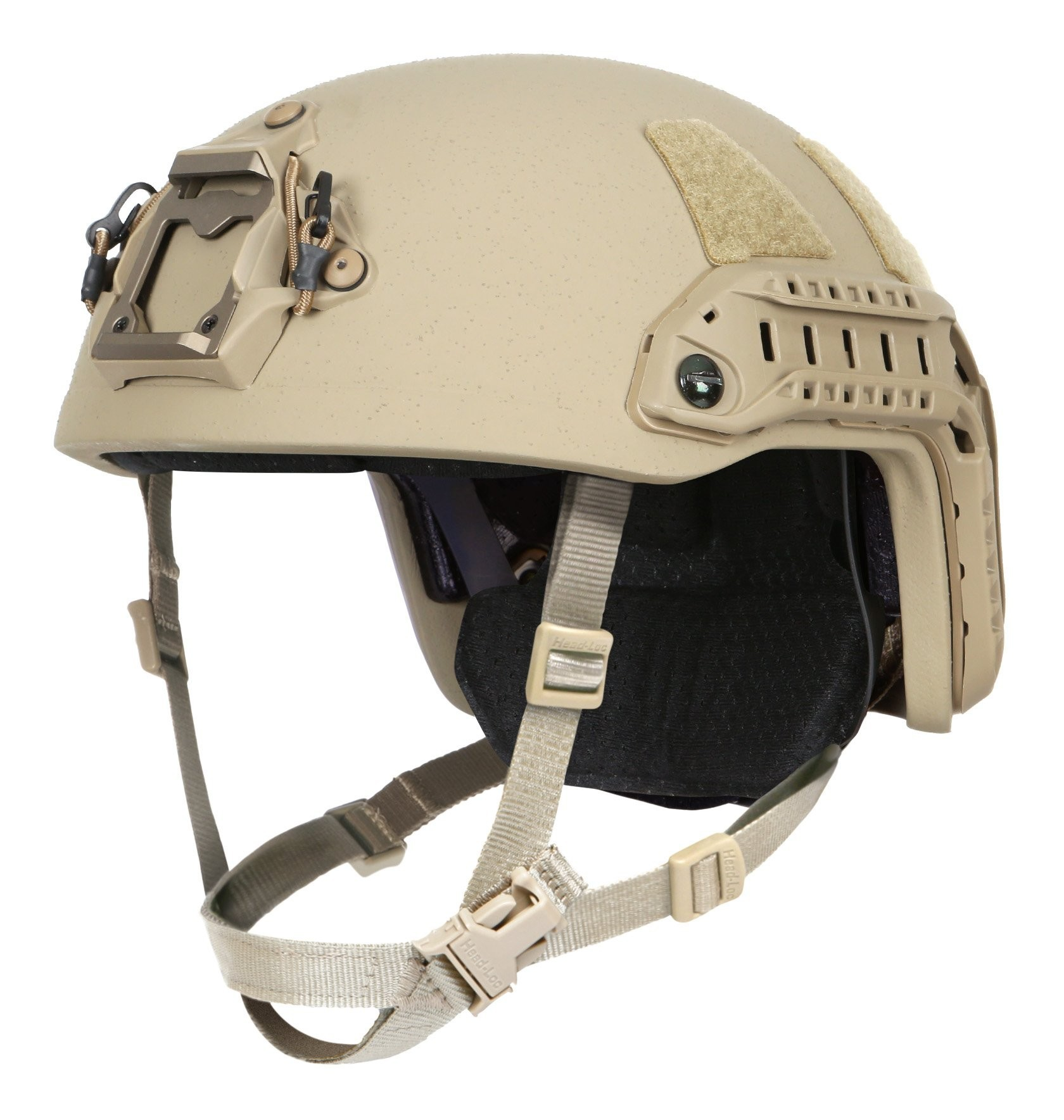
A FAST helmet, an example of a high-cut helmet

A high-cut helmet is a combat helmet that lacks the extensive ear, side, and sometimes also back coverage provided by a full-cut helmet. The intent of the lack of additional protection is that the resulting helmet is lighter, more comfortable, and easier to wear with rail systems and accessories such as wireless headsets and ear protection. High-cut helmets were possibly developed from bump helmets and custom-modified low-cut helmets in the late 20th century, and became popular in the 21st century; several modern examples are variants of preexisting low-cut helmets or ballistic versions of bump helmets.

Examples of high-cut helmets include the Future Assault Shell Technology helmet, MICH TC-2001, and the high-cut Enhanced Combat Helmet.

=== Mid-cut helmet ===
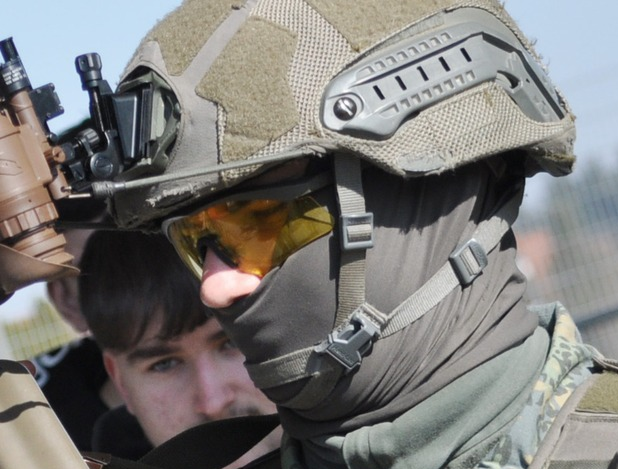
Austrian soldier wearing an Ops-Core Sentry XP, an example of a mid-cut helmet

A mid-cut helmet or gunfighter cut helmet is a combat helmet that is roughly a compromise between a full-cut helmet and a high-cut helmet, providing a similar profile and some of the extensive protection of a full-cut helmet while also allowing for the light weight and ear protection mounting permitted by a high-cut helmet.

The MICH TC-2002 is one of the few known examples of a mid-cut helmet, though newer helmets such as the Integrated Head Protection System also feature mid-cut design elements.

=== Bump helmet ===
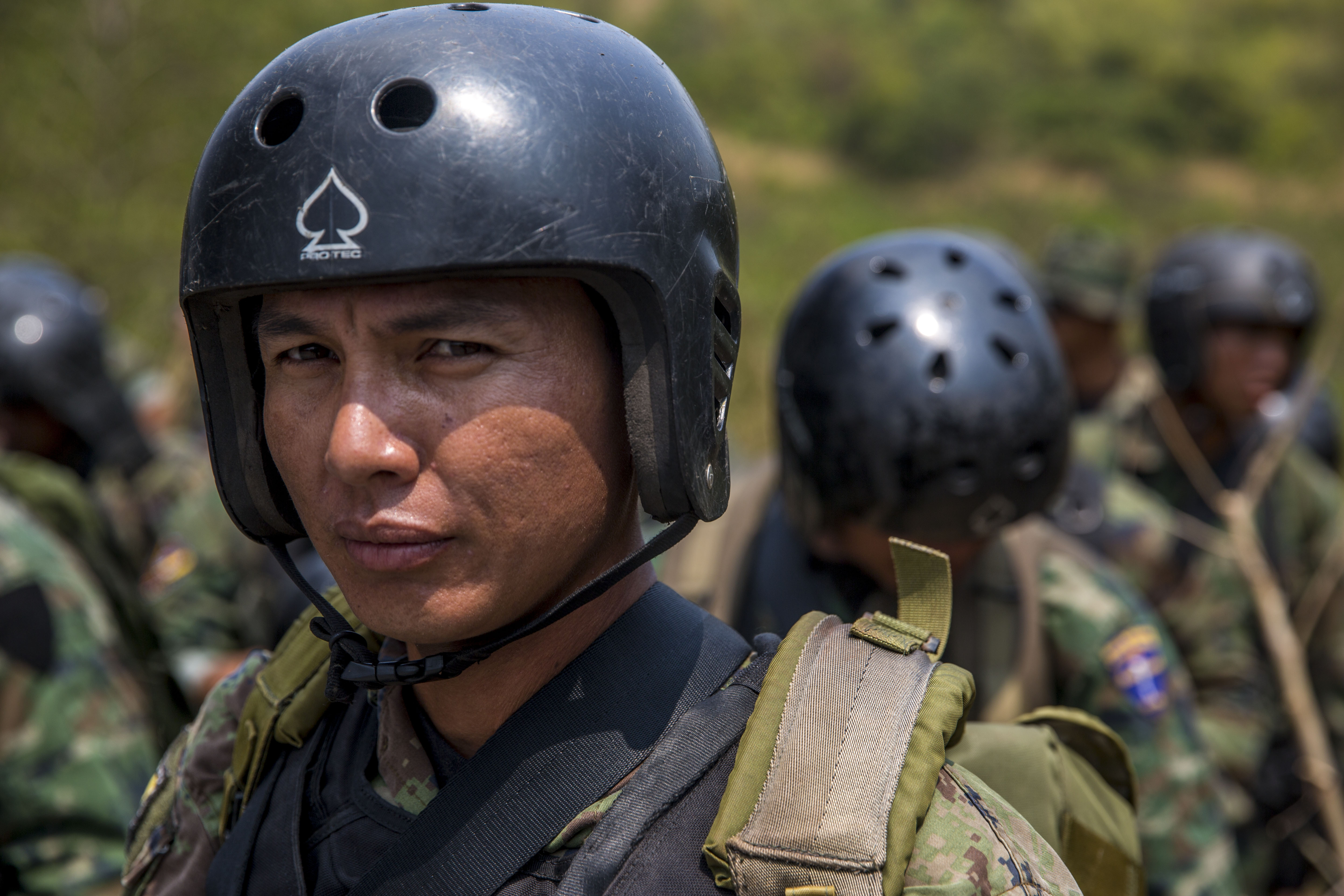
An American Pro-Tec helmet, an example of a bump helmet, worn by Royal Thai Marines

A bump helmet is a combat helmet that is intended to protect the wearer from falls and unintentional hard hits to the head (i.e. "bumps"). They thus generally lack the ballistic protection and weight of traditional combat helmets, forgoing them in favor of basic lightweight head protection and, with rails and mounts, a basic accessory-mounting platform. Sometimes, a bump helmet may simply be a commercial off-the-shelf helmet intended for skateboarding or whitewater kayaking that provides similar "bump" protection in a low-profile design, though modern purpose-built bump helmets also exist that somewhat resemble high-cut helmets.

Technically, helmets that provided little protection from anything other than unintentional impacts and weather were rather common historically, such as the pith helmet. However, the modern concept of a bump helmet dates back to the late 20th century, when the aforementioned sports helmets became popular with special forces who sought the fast and lightweight movement that bowl and low-cut helmets used by regular forces lacked, while also requiring proper head protection that cloth headgear like the beret and patrol cap could not provide. Example of modern bump helmets include the Pro-Tec helmet (originally a commercial skateboarding helmet, now with military variants) and the Team Wendy EXFIL LTP (purpose-built bump variant of a high-cut helmet).

== Padding ==
Cushioning is used to negate concussive injuries. Researchers at the Lawrence Livermore National Laboratory published a study in 2011 that concluded that the addition of 1/8 inch (3.2 mm) of cushion decreased the impact force to the skull by 24%.

== See also ==
- List of combat helmets
- Bulletproof vest
