= Lightweight Helmet =

Armored helmet used by the U.S. Marine Corps and U.S. Navy

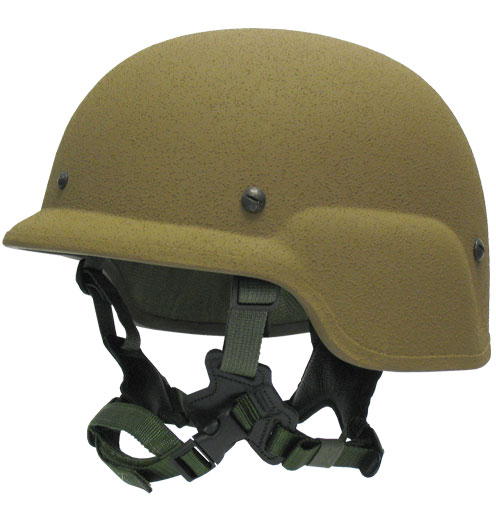
- USMC Lightweight Helmet in brown color
- Type: Helmet
- Place of origin: United States

Service history
- In service: 2003–present
- Used by: United States Marine Corps; United States Navy
- Wars: Global War on Terrorism; Iraq War; War in Afghanistan; Russo-Ukrainian War

Production history
- Designed: 1999–2003
- Manufacturer: BAE Systems, Gentex Corporation
- Produced: June 2003 – present

Specifications
- Weight: approx. 3.2 lbs/1.45 kg

The Lightweight Helmet (LWH), also known as the Lightweight Marine Corps Helmet or Lightweight Marine Helmet, is an armored helmet that is used by the United States Marine Corps and U.S. Navy. It is the U.S. Marine Corps' replacement for the PASGT combat helmet and is derived from the Modular Integrated Communications Helmet.

The helmet was rated by the manufacturer to stop penetrations of 124 gr, 9mm FMJ at 1450 (-50 + 0 ft/s). This was a considerable improvement over the previous PASGT helmet.

== History ==
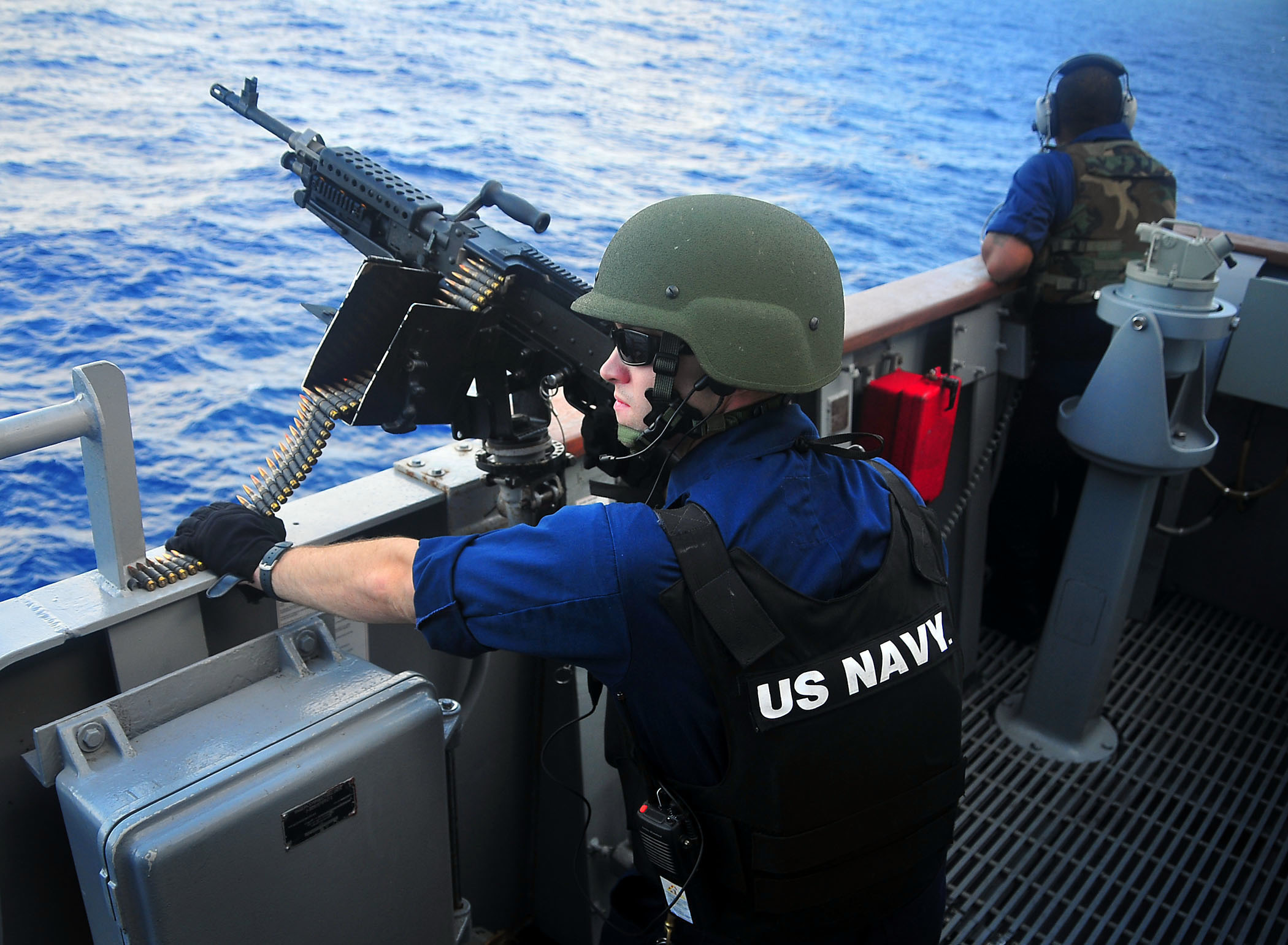
U.S. Navy sailor in 2009 wearing a LWH

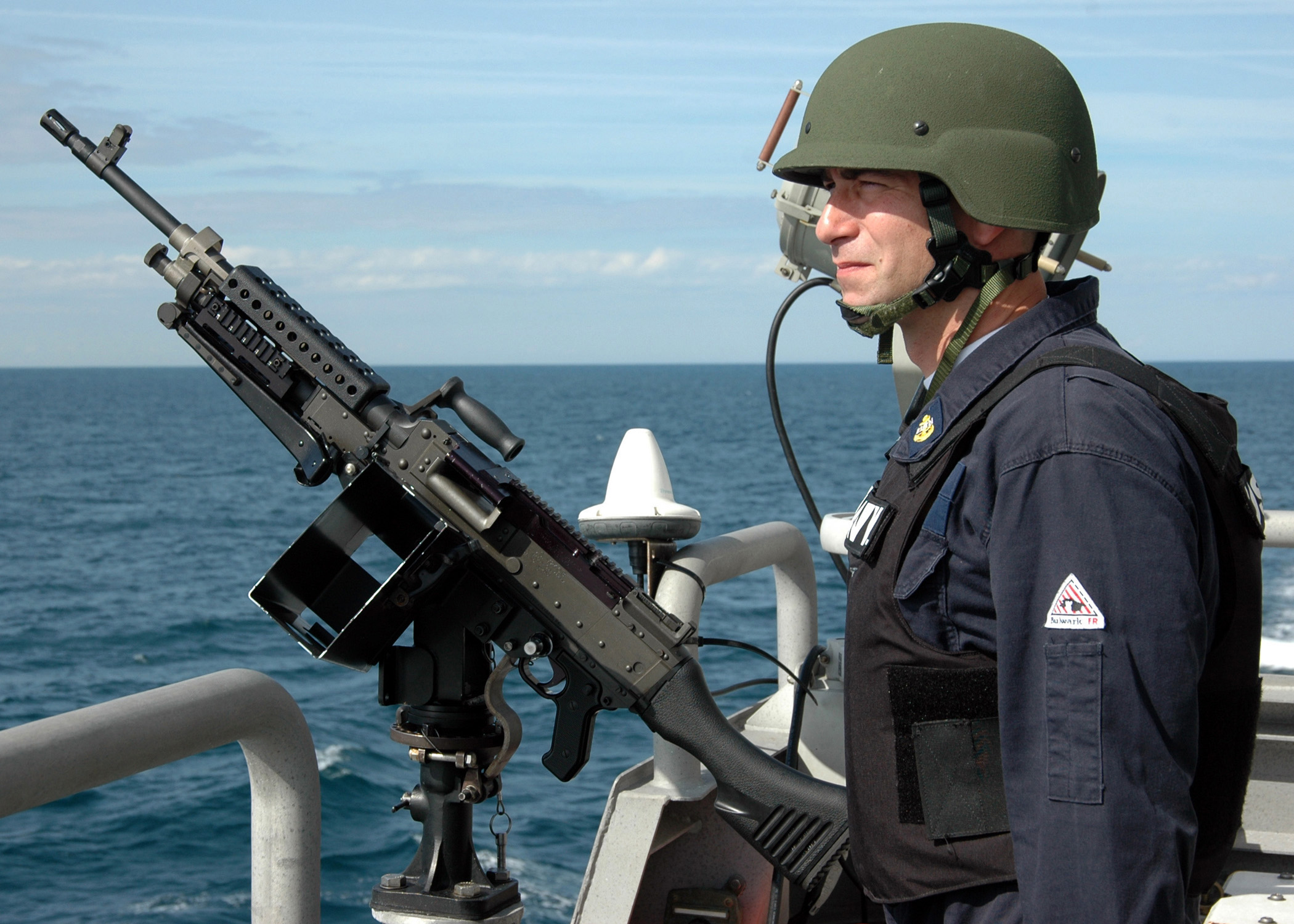
U.S. Navy sailor in 2009 wearing a LWH

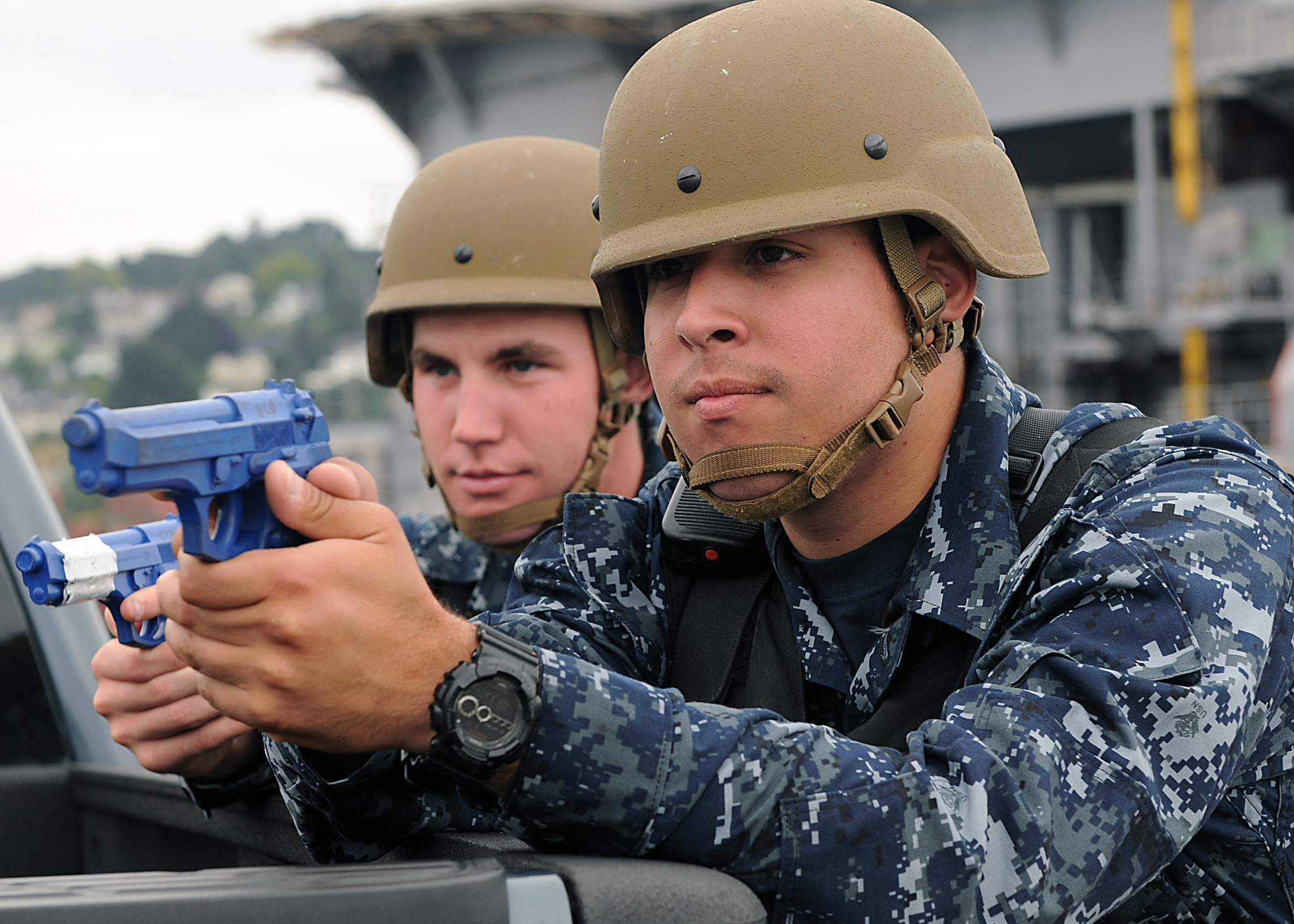
U.S. Navy sailors in 2011 each wearing a LWH

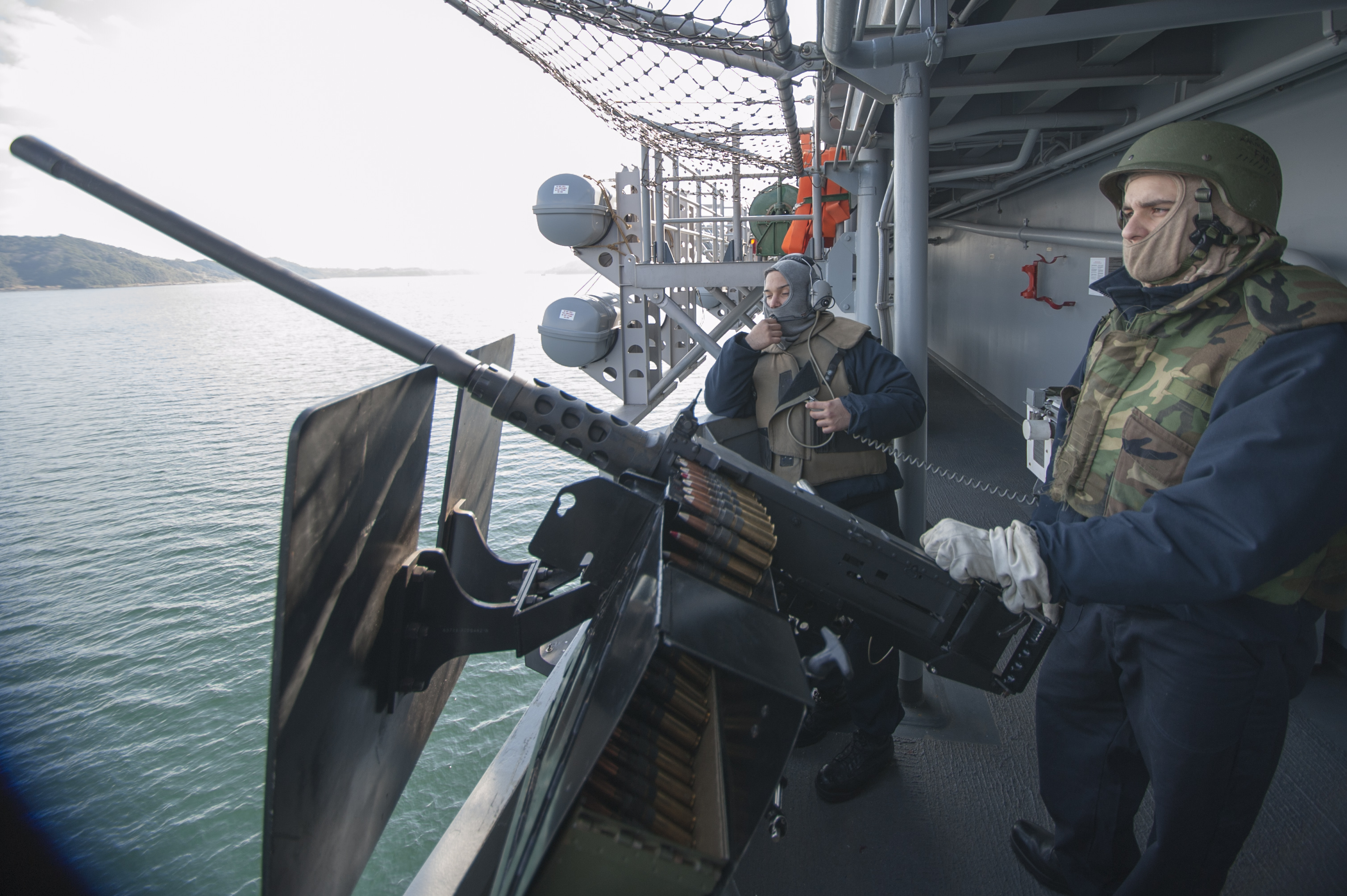
U.S. Navy sailor in 2015 wearing a LWH with a PASGT vest

As it is nearly identical to untrained eyes in shape to the PASGT, outside the Marine Corps it is still called the Fritz helmet or K-pot (due to its resemblance to the German Stahlhelm). Though heavier than the United States Army's Advanced Combat Helmet, its larger size also offers more protection and is lighter than the PASGT. The reduced weight and increased protection is through the use of Twaron, a para-aramid synthetic fiber. Featuring a four-point retention strap system (compared to the two-point retention of the PASGT) and redesigned liner, it is considered more comfortable than the PASGT.

The LWH was designed from 1999 to 2003, with prototype testing being conducted from 2000 to 2002 in California and North Carolina. 200,000 of the helmets entered service in mid-to-late 2003, with an expected service life of 15 years. It completely replaced the PASGT in USMC frontline service by 2009. The LWH was made by the Pennsylvanian-based Gentex Corporation and BAE Systems in five sizes. Beginning in 2007, pads were installed in the helmet to improve comfort for wearers.

Whereas the PASGT helmet's shell is olive drab, the LWH's is coyote brown and can be fitted with cloth helmet covers, either originally made for the PASGT or more commonly those made for the LWH in desert and woodland MARPAT, as well as a mounting bracket on the front for any sort of night vision device, such as the AN/PVS-7 night vision goggle or AN/PVS-14 monocular night vision device (MNVD). Marines currently can be issued with a sling suspension or a pad suspension to fit the inside of the helmet to the head. A nape protection system adds ballistic protection to the rear of the head was also added as to reduce strain and improve comfort to the back of the neck.

== Successor ==
The Marine Corps placed its first order for the Enhanced Combat Helmet in July 2013, and was fielded to deployed Marines by the end of 2013. The ECH is planned to equip all deployed Marines, while the Lightweight Helmet will still be used for training and noncombat purposes. Beginning in 2021, a high cut ECH variant with attachment rails and a contour similar to the Ops-Core FAST helmet already in use by special operations forces was issued to Marines in combat arms units.

== Users ==
- New Zealand:New Zealand Defence Force, 2000-2019. Supplied by UNICOR.
- Ukraine
- United States
  - United States Marine Corps (and attached U.S. Navy personnel)
  - United States Navy
    - Seabees

== See also ==
- Advanced Combat Helmet
- Enhanced Combat Helmet
