= Enhanced Combat Helmet (United States) =

American combat helmet

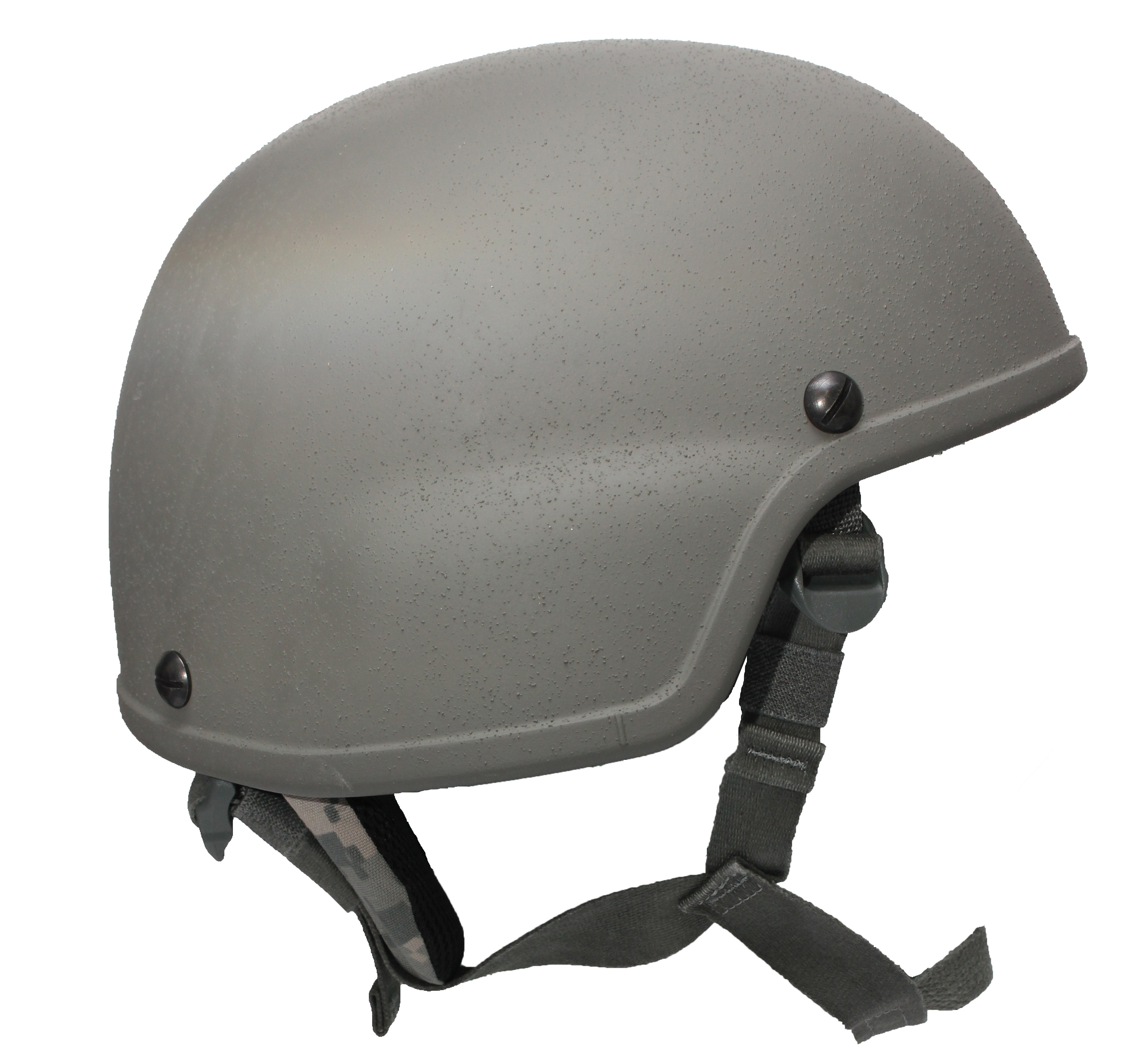
- ECH helmet low cut
- Type: Combat helmet
- Place of origin: United States

Service history
- In service: 2012–present
- Used by: See Users

Production history
- Designed: 2007
- Manufacturer: Ceradyne and Gentex
- Produced: March 2012 – present

Specifications
- Mass: 3.3 lb/1.5kg

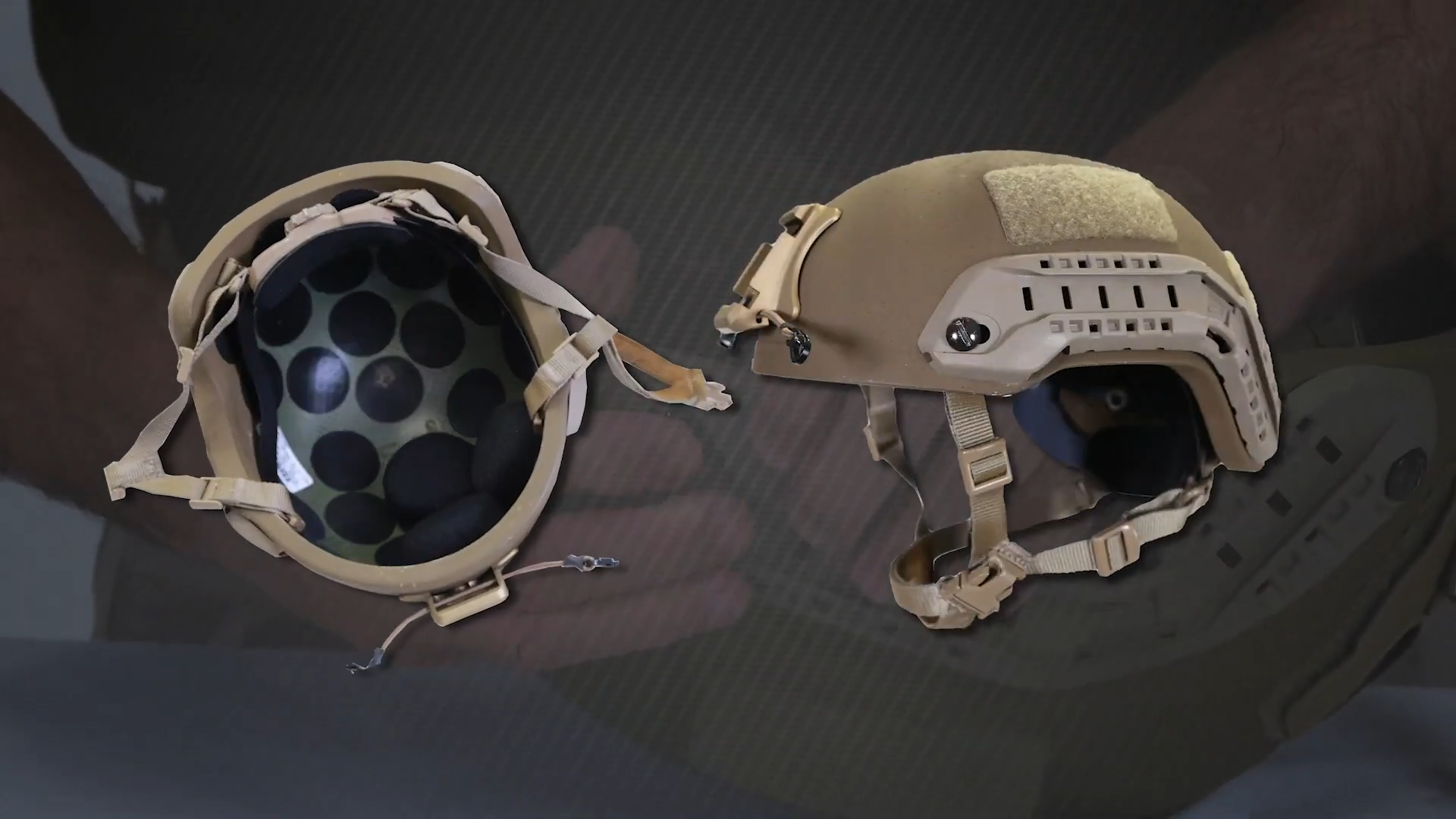
ECH Helmet Highcut

Video from the US Marine Corps detailing setup and configuration of the ECH

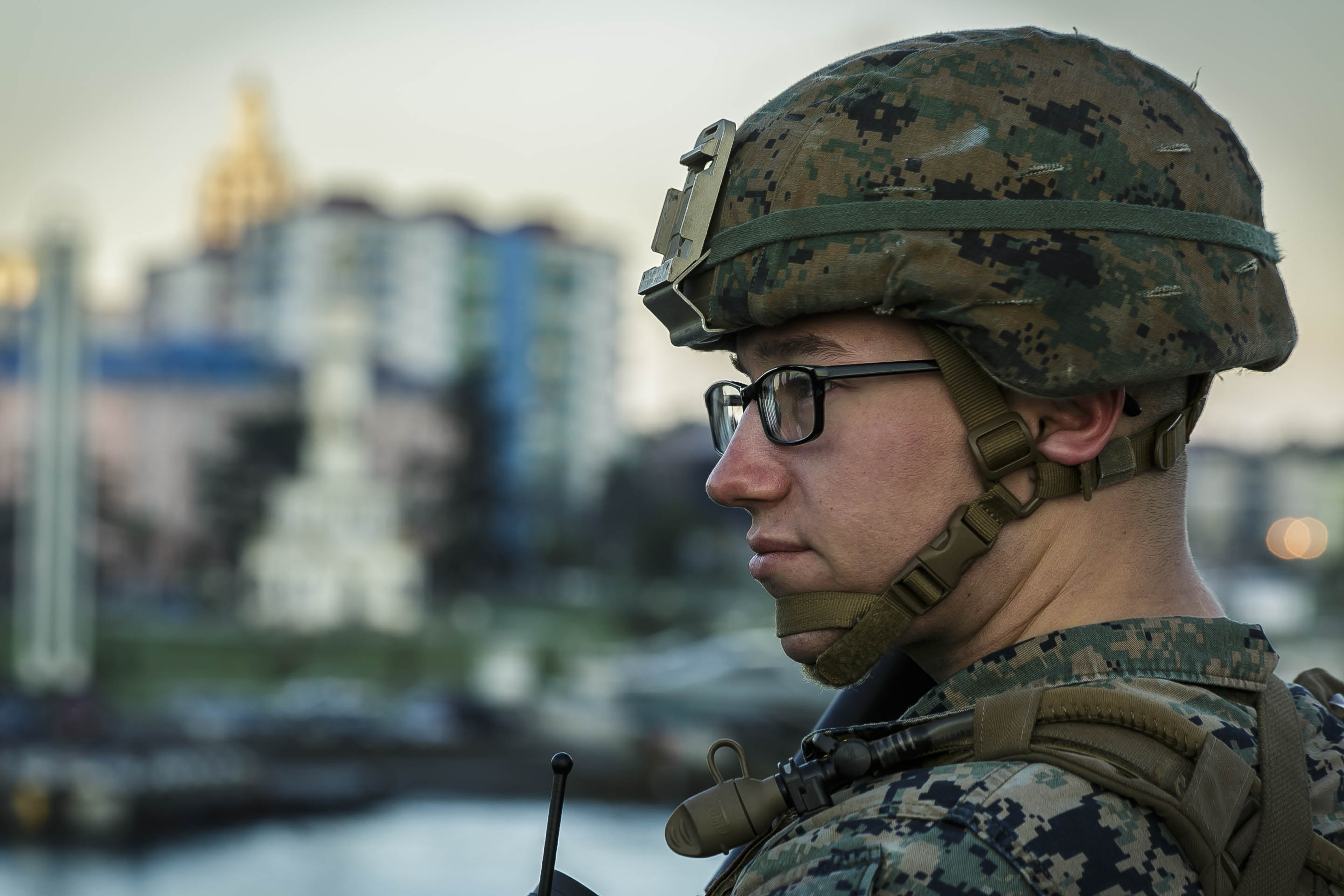
U.S. Marine wearing an ECH in 2018

The Enhanced Combat Helmet (ECH) is a combat helmet designed in conjunction of a joint program of the United States Marine Corps and United States Army to replace the current combat helmets in use by the U.S. Army, Marines, Navy, and Air Force. Although similar in shape of the Advanced Combat Helmet and its predecessor the Modular Integrated Communications Helmet, the ECH is instead constructed using thermoplastics instead of the ballistic fibers used on previous-generation combat helmets.

The US Army is in the process of replacing it with the Integrated Head Protection System.

== Design ==
The ECH's profile is very similar to the Advanced Combat Helmet (ACH) but is thicker; they can be differentiated from the ACH by the different chinstrap. The ECH helmet's shell is made of an ultra-high-molecular-weight polyethylene (UHMWPE) material. The helmet provides 35% better protection against small-arms fire and fragmentation than the ACH, and it protects against certain rifle projectiles. The helmet is compatible with camouflage fabric helmet covers. The helmet has been shown nearly impenetrable to fragments fired by test guns. In a v50 test, guns were unable to attain the velocity required to get 50% of the fragments through a helmet. The helmet's design allows for the addition of devices such as communications and night-vision equipment.

The ECH has a 4-point chinstrap and napestrap head retention system. The Marine/Navy and Army variants are differentiated in that the Marine/Navy version uses an X-Back retention system (called the Class I) and the Army uses the H-Back retention system (called the Class II).

A high cut variant of the ECH with side accessory rails and a contour similar to the Ops-Core FAST (Future Assault Shell Technology) helmet already in use by special operations forces was issued to Marine combat arms units beginning in 2021. Unlike in the earlier version of the helmet, the distinctive D-ring attachment at the jawline is not present in this design.

== Development ==
In an effort led by the U.S. Army Research Laboratory (ARL), ECH development began in 2007 under the Army Manufacturing Technology (ManTech) Program. In July 2009, more than $8 million was awarded to four vendors for five helmet designs. Mine Safety Appliances was awarded $4.7 million, Gentex Corporation was awarded $1.8 million, BAE Systems Aerospace & Defense Group was awarded $764,000, and 3M subsidiary Ceradyne was awarded $729,000. Testing in September revealed that each helmet failed in ballistic and/or blunt force tests. In February 2010, the Navy joined the program and issued their own requirements. Marine Corps officials suggested design improvements such as better materials to industry and testing resumed in June 2010. Three vendors were to be downselected, and the remaining two would be tested in November. If the program proceeded as planned the Army would acquire 200,000, the Marine Corps would acquire 38,500, and the Navy would acquire 6,700.

Ceradyne won the competition to produce the Enhanced Combat Helmet in March 2012. In July 2013, the U.S. Marine Corps ordered 3,850 helmets for deployed Marines, to be fielded before the end of 2013. The Marine Corps plans to buy 77,000 helmets, enough to outfit a large contingent of deployed U.S. Marines. When they return, they will be turned in. The Lightweight Helmet and Modular Integrated Communications Helmet will still be used for training and noncombat purposes. PEO Soldier also confirmed that the Army will field the helmet. Fielding was scheduled to begin in October 2013. The Marine Corps' ultimate goal is to issue the ECH to all 182,000 Marines.

Prior to enhancements under ManTech, every ballistic helmet in the U.S. military used a thermoset-based combination of aramid fiber with a PVB-phenolic resin. Although there have been improvements in the aramid fibers, the material and processing technology in the ACH had not changed in 30 years. The ManTech program focused on addressing technology barriers that inhibited a new class of improved ballistic materials, including new grades of Dyneema, Spectra, and thermoplastic coated aramids.

The Army helmet fabrication goal was to develop an entirely new methodology for mass-producing complex shapes and combining layers of different thermoplastic materials. During this time, ARL and partners created a new molding technology, which included a manufacturing process reducing labor by 40% and waste by 70%.

The ManTech program has also produced the Ops-Core FAST helmet, fielded by the Green Berets, the Navy SEALS, and other special operations forces. The FAST helmet offers 25% weight reduction; a derivative of the FAST helmet, known as the Maritime (MT), offers a 35% weight reduction. The FAST helmet and its derivatives also use UHMWPE, and the technology includes new manufacturing processes developed at ARL, in collaboration with U.S. Army Natick Soldier Research, Development And Engineering Center and Program Executive Office (PEO) Soldier. ARL and its partners received the Department of Defense Manufacturing Technology Program Achievement Award in 2009 for work on ECH.

== Users ==
- Philippines: Ceradyne awarded contract for 3,121 helmets in December 2017 with a submitted bid amount of Php 202,899,331.00 ($4119783.37 USD) and for 11,084 helmets with a submitted bid amount of Php 720,471,084.00 ($14628854.5 USD) for the Philippine National Police. These helmets were provided by Armscor.
- United States: Used by United States Marine Corps to replace the Lightweight Helmet (LWH). Also in limited use by the United States Army, pending replacement with Integrated Head Protection System helmet.

== See also ==
- Head Gear System
- Future Assault Shell Technology helmet (FAST)
