= Advanced Combat Helmet =

American combat helmet

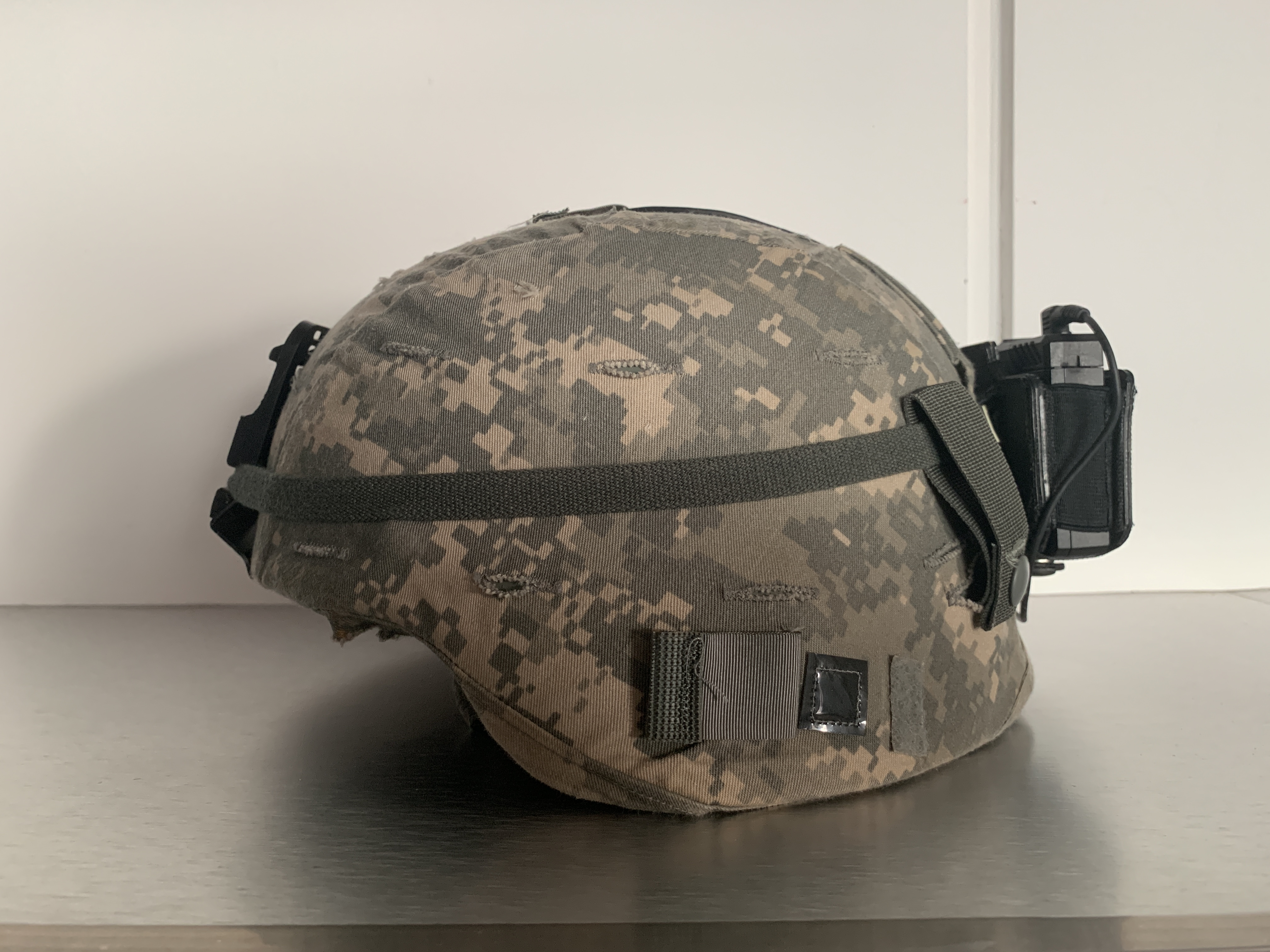
- ACH side view
- Type: Combat helmet
- Place of origin: United States of America

Service history
- In service: 2003-present
- Used by: See Users
- Wars: In U.S. service: Global War on Terrorism; War in Afghanistan; Iraq War; American-led intervention in the Syrian civil war; In non-U.S. service: Mexican drug war

Production history
- Designer: U.S. Army Soldier Systems Center
- Manufacturer: ArmorSource; Gentex; MKU; MSA Safety; Specialty Defense Systems; Revision Military (Gen II variant)
- Variants: Generation II Lightweight Advanced Combat Helmet

Specifications
- Weight: Without cover: Less than 3 lb (1.36 kg) (Small); 3 lb (1.36 kg) (Medium); 3.3 lb (1.50 kg) (Large); 3.8 lb (1.72 kg) (X-Large)

2013 video by the U.S. Army, showcasing the ACH's protective capabilities

The Advanced Combat Helmet (ACH) is the former main combat helmet of the United States Army, used since the early 2000s. It was developed by the U.S. Army Soldier Systems Center, the U.S. Army Special Operations Command, and the U.S. Army Research Laboratory to be the next generation of protective combat helmets for use by the American ground forces. The ACH is derived from the Modular Integrated Communications Helmet (MICH).

The ACH is currently in the process of being phased out and replaced by the Enhanced Combat Helmet (ECH), an improvement upon the ACH derived from its design; however, both the ACH and the newer ECH are being replaced by the Integrated Head Protection System (IHPS).

== History ==
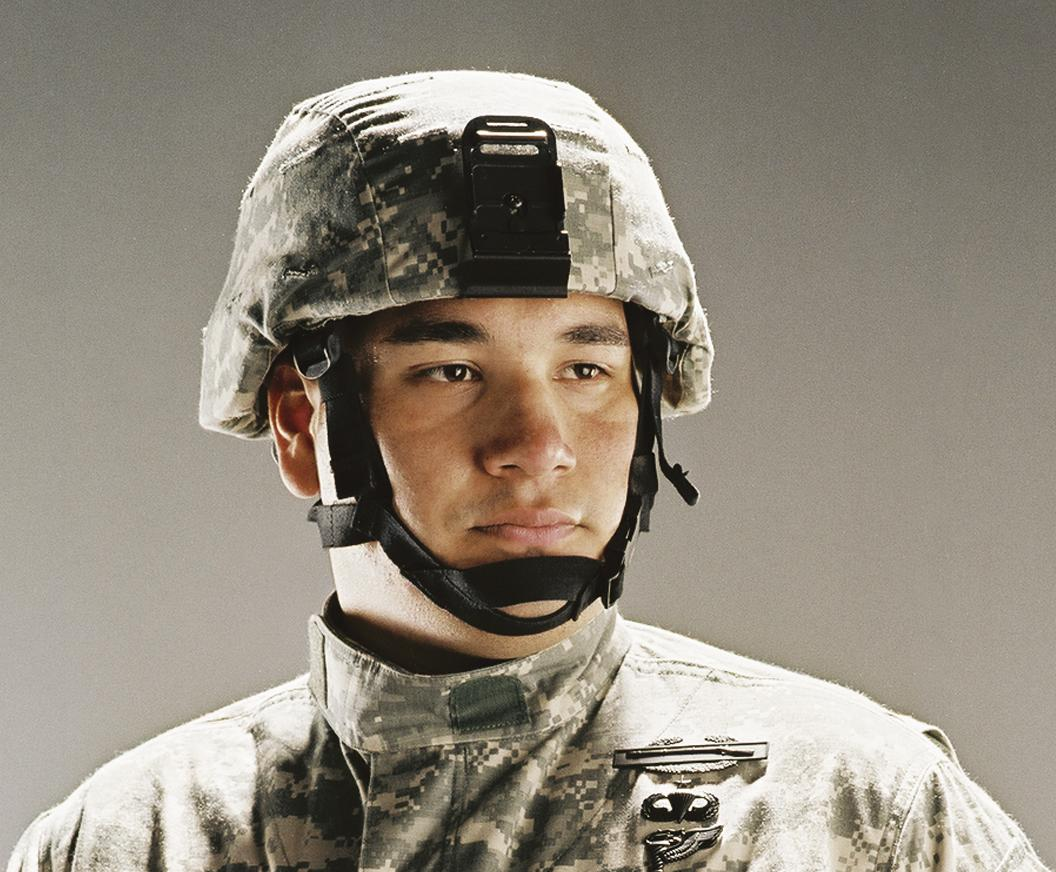
A soldier wearing the ACH in UCP pattern

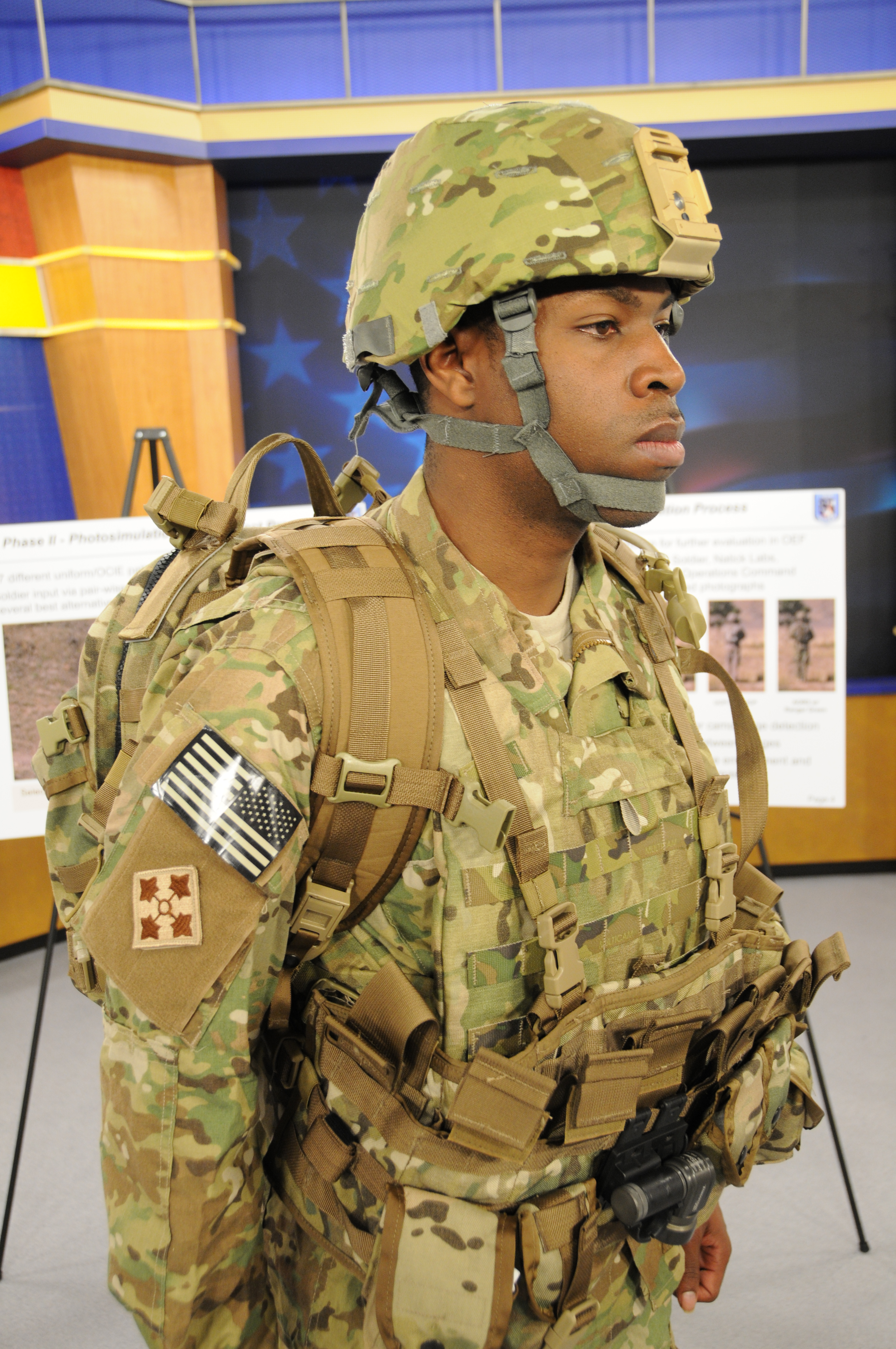
A 4th Infantry Division soldier wearing an ACH helmet in OEF-CP camouflage

=== 2000s ===
The Advanced Combat Helmet was first fielded beginning in 2003 (Note: Some sources report that the helmet was first fielded in 2003.) in limited numbers to eventually replace the PASGT helmet.

In 2004, manufacturers such as Gentex Corporation, MSA Safety, and Specialty Defense Systems were already fulfilling contracts to produce the ACH.

In 2006, 102,000 helmets were ordered from ArmorSource, of which 99,000 were delivered when the contract was fulfilled and properly closed.

In 2007, the Army introduced a ballistic "nape pad" that attaches to the ACH's rear suspension system. Of these, 430,000 were to be issued in the Rapid Fielding Initiative (RFI).

Beginning in 2008, the Army's Program Executive Office Soldier outfitted soldiers of the 101st Airborne Division and 4th Infantry Division bound for Iraq with helmet-mounted sensors designed to gather data on head injuries (or traumatic brain injuries) caused during IED detonations. The data collected will help in the designing of improvements for the ACH's suspension and chin strap systems.

In May 2009, 55,000 of these were in storage and 44,000 were in use by U.S. Army, Navy, and Air Force personnel. The 44,000 helmets in use by service members were recalled by the U.S. Army in May 2010 due to potentially defective materials being used. Eventually, the contractor agreed to pay a $3 million fine, without admitting to any wrongdoing by the contractor.

In May 2009, 34,218 ACHs made by Gentex were recalled. Certain screws attaching the chinstrap and other parts to the helmet did not conform to specifications in the contract. The screws failed ballistics tests at extreme temperatures. Gentex alleges its subcontractor had fabricated the compliance certificates for the screws.

Beginning in late 2009, an OEF-CP (MultiCam) helmet cover for the Advanced Combat Helmet was issued to soldiers deployed in Afghanistan.

=== 2010s ===
On 7 March 2016, Armorsource LLC agreed to pay $3 million to settle False Claims Act allegations. Revision was awarded a contract for the ACH II contract.

The ACH and Lightweight Helmet (LWH) will eventually be replaced by the Enhanced Combat Helmet and Integrated Head Protection System (IHPS).

== Design ==
The shape of the ACH is virtually identical to the MICH TC-2000. Compared to the PASGT helmet, the front brow is eliminated to improve upwards visibility and allow easier mounting of night-vision goggle brackets. The side brim has been raised to the point that the entire lower brim of the helmet is "flat" compared to the PASGT which curves upwards at the back. This is to allow greater compatibility with communications headsets and improve hearing when headsets are not used.

The ACH uses ballistic fiber such as kevlar and twaron.

In 2007, the Army developed and introduced a ballistic "nape pad" that attaches to the ACH's rear suspension system and coincided with the introduction of the Improved Outer Tactical Vest (IOTV). The pad reduces soldier deaths from fragmentation wounds to the neck and lower head.

The ACH comes from the factory painted sand tan, grey, black, or forest green (officially designated as Camouflage Green 383). It is often worn with cloth helmet covers in various camouflage patterns including Universal Camouflage Pattern, Operational Camouflage Pattern, and the USAF's ABU pattern. The helmet cover may also have small squares of infrared reflective material on the sides, top, and rear which illuminate when viewed through thermal imaging, allowing for friend or foe identification during combat. The helmet can also be fitted with an elastic band with a pair of glow in the dark "cat eye" patches, similar to those seen on the older PASGT helmet. A pair of Cordura straps can be mounted on the rear of the helmet to aid in the retention of protective goggles. The ACH is also commonly seen with a mounting bracket on the front for night vision devices. These brackets often come in one of two designs; a tan or black "tombstone" shape that attaches to the helmet with a single screw through the center, or a larger tan diamond-shaped mount that attaches with three screws, one at each corner. The ACH can also be fitted with Picatinny rails on the sides of the helmet for mounting flashlights or digital cameras.

== Variants ==
=== Lightweight Advanced Combat Helmet ===
The Lightweight Advanced Combat Helmet Generation II (LW-ACH Gen II) weighs up to one pound less than the original ACH while offering the same ballistic protection. The ACH Gen II achieved an average of 22% in weight reduction from legacy helmets. (Note: For both Large and XLarge the reduction is 24% over the legacy ACH, while for Medium and Small helmets, it is 21%. The average is 22%. For example, the XLarge legacy ACH is 3.88 lbs while the ACH Gen II in XL is 2.94 lbs, or a 24% weight reduction. (PEO Soldier Talks About The Advanced Combat Helmet Gen II | Soldier Systems Daily))

== Users ==
- Australia: The Australian Enhanced Combat Helmet is an ACH variant made by Rabintex, Israel used by all branches of Australian Defence Force and Specialist Response Group of the Australian Federal Police, replaced by the Tiered Combat Helmet.
- Iraq: Used by Iraqi commandos.
- Ireland: Rabintex 303 AU variant used by Irish Defence Force.
- Israel: In use by Yamam.
- Mexico: Used by the Mexican Army and SEDENA and SEMAR Special Operations Forces.
- Morocco: Seen in use with Royal Moroccan Army infantry as of February 2024 (MKU Kavro MKH/ACH-7 version). Locally produced.
- New Zealand: Australian Enhanced Combat Helmet made by Rabintex, Israel used by all branches of New Zealand Defence Force and Special Tactics Group of the New Zealand Police from 2009 to 2019.
- Macedonia / North Macedonia: ACH helmets made by Eurokompozit used by the Macedonian Police's Special Task Unit "Tigers" and Special Operations Regiment (North Macedonia).
- South Korea: ACH worn by KATUSA units. Some of ACH helmets including KCI-105, a South Korean-made ACH style, are worn by ROK Army along with KH-2000.
- United States: Used by the U.S. Army, pending replacement by the Integrated Head Protection System helmet.
