= AN/PSQ-20 =

US military night vision goggle

AN/PSQ-20 Enhanced Night Vision Goggle
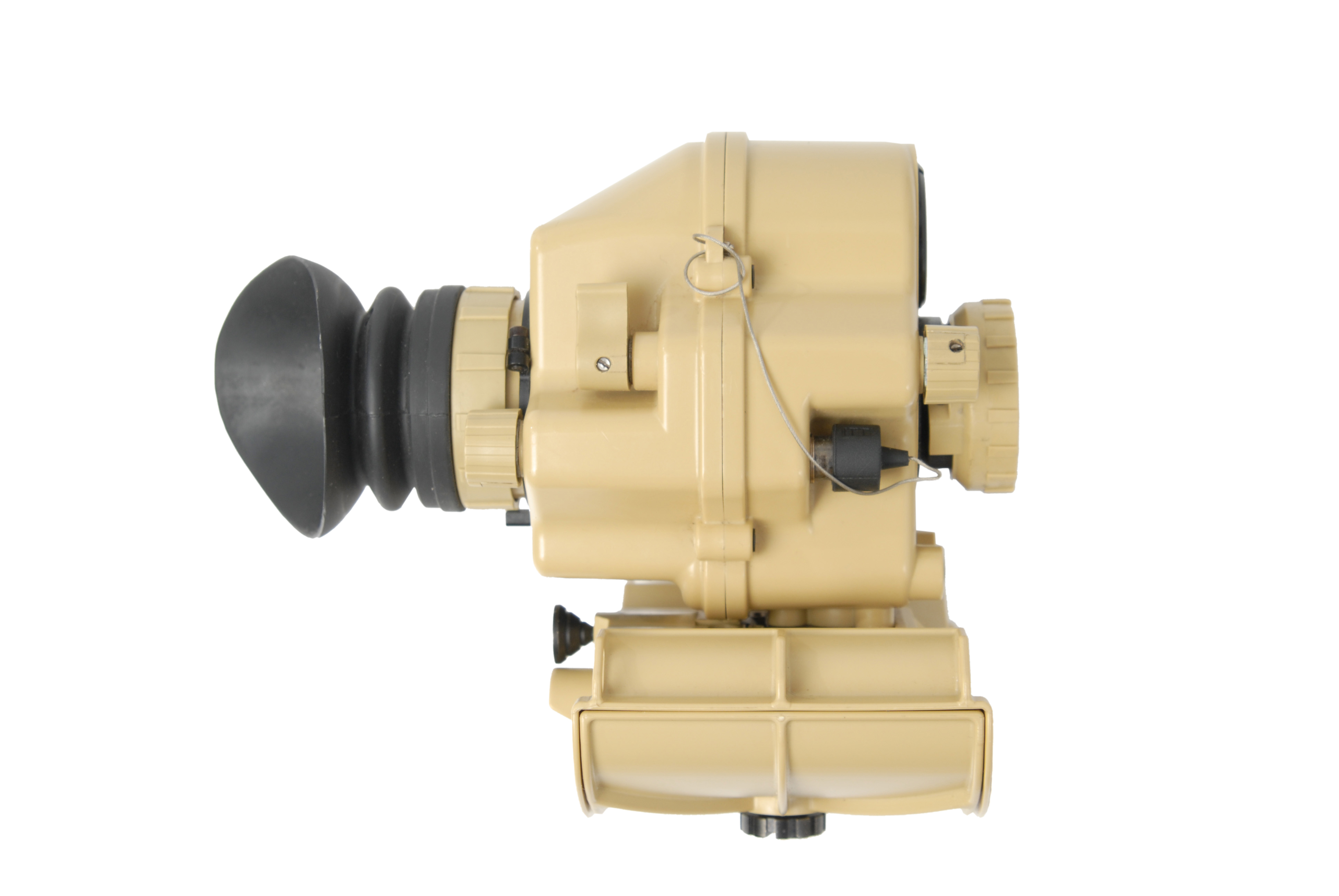
- Profile view of the AN/PSQ-20 ENVG-I (F6023)
- Type: Monocular
- Place of origin: United States
- Category: Military

Service history
- In service: 2008–present
- Used by: US Armed Forces

Production history
- Designer: ITT Exelis; Raytheon
- Manufacturer: ITT Exelis
- Unit cost: US$10,000

Specifications
- Weight: c. 2 lb (0.91 kg)
- Cont Operation (h): 7.5 hours
- Mode of Operation: Passive
- Field of vision (°): 28 degrees (IR); 38 degrees (I^{2})
- System zoom: 1x

The AN/PSQ-20 Enhanced Night Vision Goggle (ENVG) is a third-generation passive monocular night vision device developed for the United States Armed Forces by ITT Exelis. It fuses image-intensifying and thermal-imaging technologies, enabling vision in conditions with very little light. The two methods can be used simultaneously or individually. The ENVG was selected by the US Army's Program Executive Office Soldier (PEO Soldier) as a supporting device for the Future Force Warrior program in 2004, and is intended to replace the older AN/PVS-7 and AN/PVS-14 systems. Although more expensive and heavier than previous models, US Special Forces began using the goggles in 2008 and the US Army's 10th Mountain Division began fielding the AN/PSQ-20 in 2009. Improvements to the goggles have been attempted to make them lighter, as well as enabling the transmission of digital images to and from the battlefield.

In accordance with the Joint Electronics Type Designation System (JETDS), the "AN/PSQ-20" designation represents the 20th design of an Army-Navy electronic device for portable special combination equipment. The JETDS system also now is used to name all Department of Defense electronic systems.

== Development ==
In August 2003, PEO Soldier, the acquisition agency of the US Army, started evaluating designs from ITT Industries and Northrop Grumman for an advanced night vision device that could support the planned Future Force Warrior program. Of the two competing designs, the ITT design which was developed in association with Raytheon, was chosen for development in July 2004 with an initial order for 75 systems. Development testing of the ENVG with the US Army, designated AN/PSQ-20, began by mid-2006, and was completed in March 2007. Operational testing started in June 2007, with low-rate initial production of the device beginning around the same time. ITT were given a five-year contract in April 2005 with a potential value of US$560 million, with the view of replacing the existing AN/PVS-7 and AN/PVS-14.

== Design and features ==
The AN/PSQ-20 Enhanced Night Vision Goggle combines image intensifier (I^{2} or II) and infra-red (IR, also called thermal imaging) technologies, and is the first night vision device to do so. Before this "fusing", these two technologies could only be used separately. The AN/PSQ-20 allows both methods to be used together or individually, and can be helmet-mounted or hand held. It is roughly the same size as the AN/PVS-14 with similar controls, and is powered by four AA type batteries allowing continuous combined use of II and IR for 7.5 hours. The device can be used for a further 7.5 hours in image intensifier mode.

Classified as a third-generation passive night vision device, the AN/PSQ-20 can provide vision through thermal imaging even in situations where there isn't enough ambient light for the image intensifiers, thus eliminating the need for infra-red illumination (active night vision). It can also see through battlefield obscurants such as smoke and fog. The combined technologies allow better target identification and recognition, thereby improving the soldier's mobility and situational awareness. The center of gravity of the device is close to the face of the wearer, making the helmet-mounted use more comfortable, as well as increasing stability. Aiming lasers can also be integrated with it. However, at a unit cost of US$18,000 and with a weight of almost 2 pounds (0.91 kg), the AN/PSQ-20 is more expensive and heavier than the devices it is intended to replace.

=== FWS-I combination ===
In 2019, the Army plans to begin fielding the Family of Weapon Sights-Individual (FWS-I), an optic that can be mounted on various weapons like the M4 carbine, M16A4 rifle, M249 SAW, M136 AT4, and M141 Bunker Defeat Munition. The FWS-I is designed to work with the ENVG-III by transmitting data from the scope to the goggles, so the soldier can aim the weapon without needing to raise it to their eye. Both systems were brought together under the Rapid Target Acquisition (RTA) capability that combined two separate programs of record with separate devices together to make them interoperable. The goggles are connected through fiber optic wires to a processor on the back of the helmet that wirelessly communicates with the weapon-mounted FWS-I; because of the systems' short range and low power, jamming the wireless connection is not a concern. Connecting with the ENVG-III also expands the field of vision from a scope's 18-26 degrees to the goggle's 40 degrees. By seeing what the scope sees through the goggles, soldiers during close-quarters combat (CQC) can point their weapons out of defilade positions like over walls and around corners and fire accurately without exposing their head or torso to enemy fire. The US Army first experimented with aiming and shooting weapons behind cover during the Land Warrior program, but it relied on connecting wires between the helmet-mounted display and weapon-mounted thermal sight that could get caught, and early sights were too heavy and bulky.

== Service and improvements ==
The AN/PSQ-20 ENVG was first issued to the US Army in April 2008. The 10th Mountain Division received about 300 units in February 2009, making it the first non-special forces unit to use the device.

PM Soldier Sensors and Lasers, which is part of PEO Soldier, has been working on making the AN/PSQ-20 more rugged by using tougher housing material. Efforts have also been made to make the device lighter, as well as to produce and transmit digital images of the view provided. As a result, a prototype named Digital Enhanced Night Vision Goggle or ENVG (D) was provided to the US Army for evaluation in June 2009, which enables digitally fused images to be exported and imported.

As of July 2015, the US Army had bought about 9,000 ENVG-I and 16,000 ENVG-II units. Beginning in FY 2017, the ENVG-III is expected to begin fielding, with a total of 41,000 to be produced by BAE Systems and DRS Technologies. Like previous versions, the ENVG-III allows soldiers to choose between night vision, thermal, hybrid, and a hybrid where thermal images show up with an outline, but extends the thermal capacity out to the entire 40-degree field of view rather than just a circle in the middle, and has a sleeker design for the device and battery pack, improved resolution, is lighter at less than 2 pounds (0.91 kg), and is designed to work with the FWS-I. Plans are to equip 24 ENVGs per platoon, with each costing an estimated US$10,000, cheaper than previous versions due to competition and improved technology.

== See also ==
- Night vision
- List of military electronics of the United States
