= Toho Tenax =

Toho Tenax Co., Ltd.
- Type: Subsidiary
- Industry: Chemicals - Fibers
- Founded: 1934 as Toho Synthetic Fiber
- Defunct: 2018
- Fate: Acquired and integrated into Teijin Limited in 2018.
- Successor: Teijin Carbon America, Inc; Teijin Carbon Europe GmbH; Teijin Carbon Singapore Pte. Ltd.; Teijin Limited, Carbon Fiber Business Unit
- Headquarters: Chiyoda, Tokyo, Japan
- Key people: Yoshikuni Utsunomiya (President)
- Products: Tenax, Pyromex and Thermex
- Revenue: ▲JP¥ 51.542 billion (FY 2007)
- Net income: ▲JP¥ 2.360 billion (FY 2007)
- Number of employees: 1,328
- Parent: Teijin (100%)
- Website: www.tohotenax.com

Toho Tenax (東邦テナックス, Tōhō Tenakkusu) was an international company that supplied customers throughout the world with carbon fiber under the trade name Tenax. It was integrated into Teijin Limited in 2018 and subsequently renamed Teijin Carbon, with the trade name Tenax being retained for its' carbon fiber products.

== History ==
Toho Tenax has been a member of the Teijin Group since 1999 when Teijin Limited acquired an equity stake in Toho Rayon Co., Ltd., which renamed to Toho Tenax Co., Ltd.

Since May 2018, Toho Tenax was integrated to its subsidiary Teijin, and all of the group's subsidiaries were renamed after Teijin.

== Description ==
Toho Tenax has production units in Japan, the US and in Germany. The main products are carbon fiber, oxidized poly-acrylic-nitrile (PAN) fiber and advanced composite material.

== See also ==
- Teijin
- Carbon fiber
- Twaron
