= Kevlar =

Heat-resistant and strong aromatic polyamide fiber

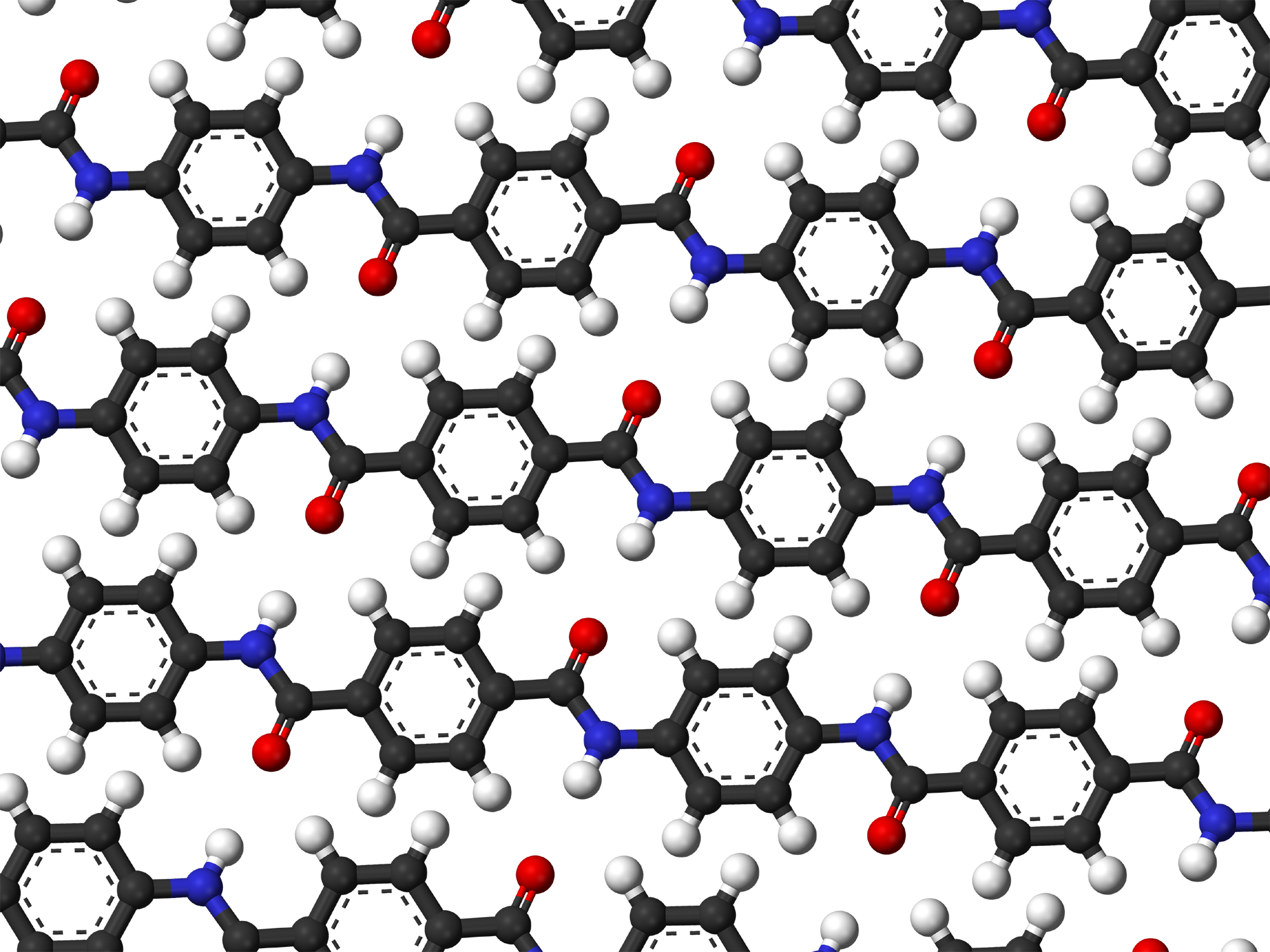
- Ball-and-stick model of a single layer of the crystal structure

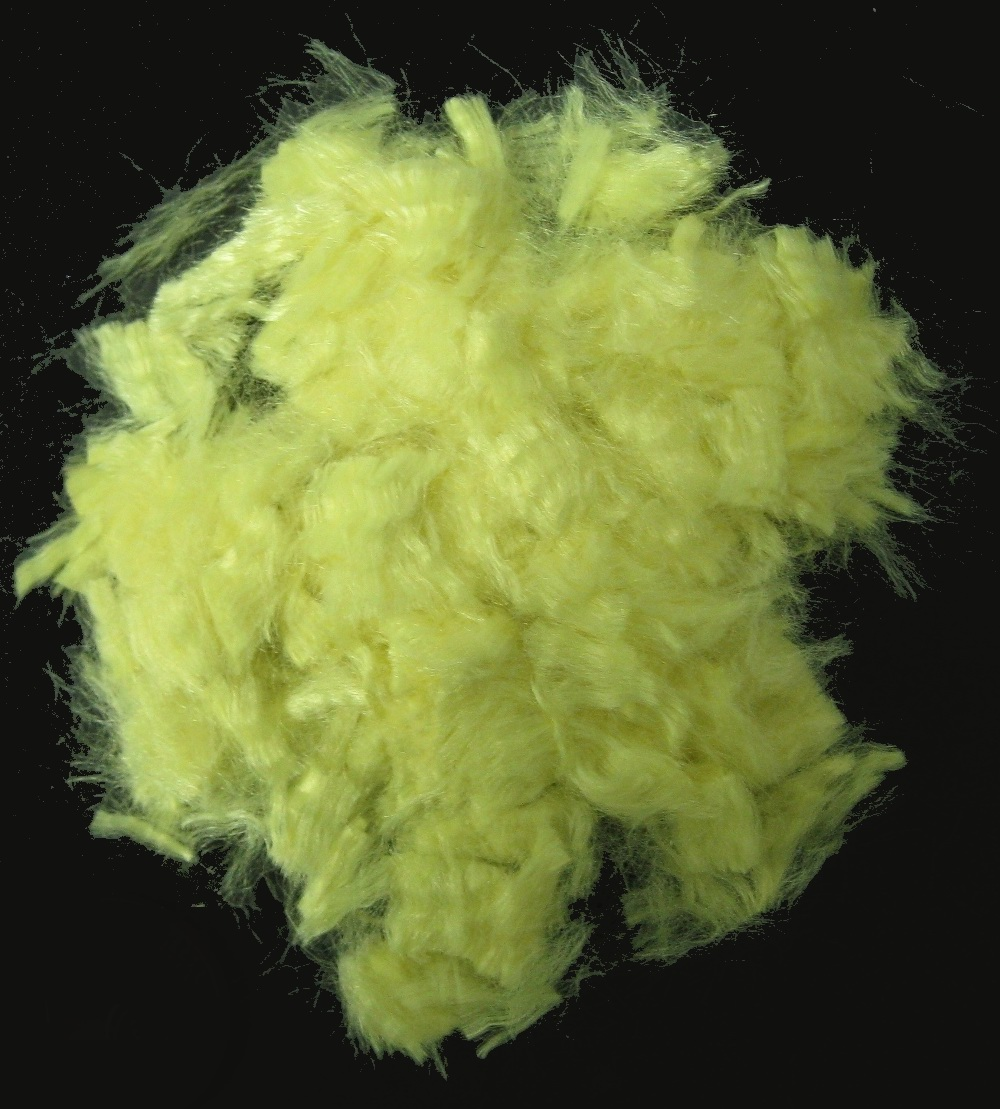

Names
- IUPAC name Poly(azanediyl-1,4-phenyleneazanediylterephthaloyl)

Identifiers
| CAS Number | 24938-64-5 |
| ChemSpider | none |

Properties
| Chemical formula | [-CO-C_{6}H_{4}-CO-NH-C_{6}H_{4}-NH-]_{n} |
- Except where otherwise noted, data are given for materials in their standard state (at 25 °C [77 °F], 100 kPa). verify (what is ?) Infobox references

Kevlar (para-aramid) is a strong, heat-resistant synthetic fiber, related to other aramids such as Nomex and Technora. Developed by Stephanie Kwolek at DuPont in 1965, the high-strength material was first used commercially in the early 1970s as a replacement for steel in racing tires. It is typically spun into ropes or fabric sheets that can be used as such, or as an ingredient in composite material components.

Kevlar has many applications, ranging from bicycle tires and racing sails to bulletproof vests, due to its high tensile strength-to-weight ratio; by this measure it is five times stronger than steel. It is also used to make modern marching drumheads that withstand high impact, and for mooring lines and other underwater applications.

A similar fiber, Twaron, with the same chemical structure was developed by Akzo in the 1970s. Commercial production started in 1986, and Twaron is manufactured by Teijin Aramid.

The term Kevlar is of obscure origin and likely created arbitrarily.

== History ==
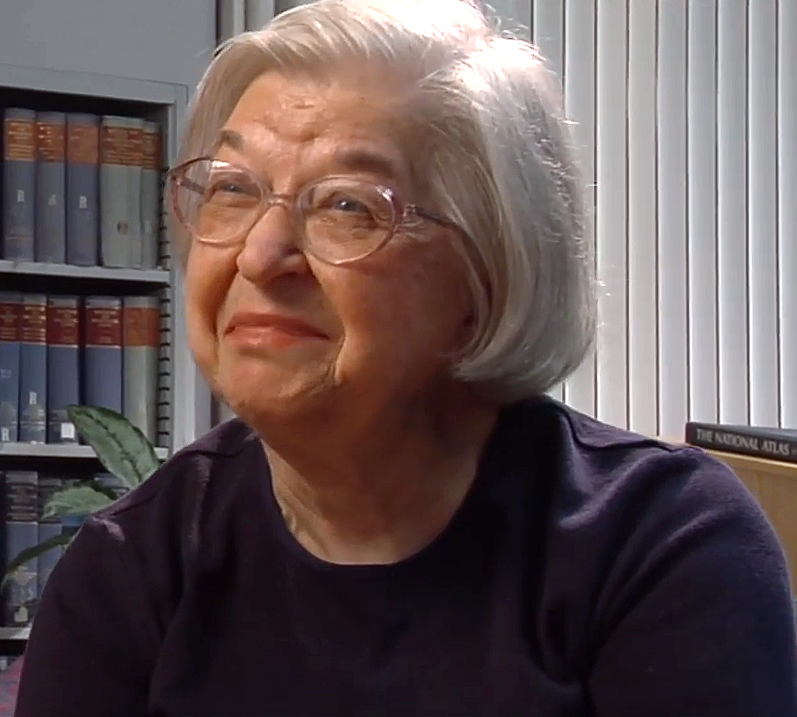
Inventor of Kevlar, Stephanie Kwolek, an American chemist

Poly-paraphenylene terephthalamide (K29) was invented by the American chemist Stephanie Kwolek while working for DuPont, in anticipation of a gasoline shortage. In 1964, her group began searching for a new lightweight strong fiber to use for light, but strong, tires. The polymers she had been working with, poly-p-phenylene-terephthalate and polybenzamide, formed liquid crystals in solution, unlike other polymers at the time.

The solution was "cloudy, opalescent upon being stirred, and of low viscosity" and usually was thrown away. However, Kwolek persuaded the technician, Charles Smullen, who ran the spinneret, to test her solution, and was amazed to find that the fiber did not break, unlike nylon. Her supervisor and her laboratory director understood the significance of her discovery and a new field of polymer chemistry quickly arose. By 1971, modern Kevlar was introduced. However, Kwolek was not very involved in developing the applications of Kevlar.

In 1971, Lester Shubin, who was then the director of Science and Technology for the National Institute for Law Enforcement and Criminal Justice, suggested using Kevlar to replace nylon in bullet-proof vests. Prior to the introduction of Kevlar, flak jackets made of nylon had provided much more limited protection to users. Shubin later recalled how the idea developed: "We folded it over a couple of times and shot at it. The bullets didn't go through." In tests, they strapped Kevlar onto anesthetized goats and shot at their hearts, spinal cords, livers and lungs. They monitored the goats' heart rate and blood gas levels to check for lung injuries. After 24 hours, one goat died and the others had wounds that were not life threatening. Shubin received a $5 million grant to research the use of the fabric in bullet-proof vests.

Originally called Fiber B, the product was dubbed Kevlar in 1973.

Kevlar 149 was invented by Jacob Lahijani of Dupont in the 1980s.

== Production ==
The reaction of 1,4-phenylene-diamine (para-phenylenediamine) with terephthaloyl chloride yielding Kevlar

Kevlar is synthesized in solution from the monomers 1,4-phenylene-diamine (para-phenylenediamine) and terephthaloyl chloride in a condensation reaction yielding hydrochloric acid as a byproduct. The result has liquid-crystalline behavior, and mechanical drawing orients the polymer chains in the fiber's direction. Hexamethylphosphoramide (HMPA) was the solvent initially used for the polymerization, but for safety reasons, DuPont replaced it by a solution of N-methyl-pyrrolidone and calcium chloride. As this process had been patented by Akzo (see above) in the production of Twaron, a patent war ensued.

Kevlar production is expensive because of the difficulties arising from using concentrated sulfuric acid, needed to keep the water-insoluble polymer in solution during its synthesis and spinning.

Several grades of Kevlar are available:

- Kevlar K-29 – in industrial applications, such as cables, asbestos replacement, tires, and brake linings.
- Kevlar K49 – high modulus used in cable and rope products.
- Kevlar K100 – colored version of Kevlar
- Kevlar K119 – higher-elongation, flexible and more fatigue resistant
- Kevlar K129 – higher tenacity for ballistic applications
- Kevlar K149 – highest tenacity for ballistic, armor, and aerospace applications
- Kevlar AP – 15% higher tensile strength than K-29
- Kevlar XP – lighter weight resin and KM2 plus fiber combination
- Kevlar KM2 – enhanced ballistic resistance for armor applications

The ultraviolet component of sunlight degrades and decomposes Kevlar, a problem known as UV degradation, and so it is rarely used outdoors without protection against sunlight.

== Structure and properties ==
Molecular structure of Kevlar: bold represents a monomer unit, dashed lines indicate hydrogen bonds.

When Kevlar is spun, the resulting fiber has a tensile strength of about 3,000 MPa (440,000 psi), and a relative density of 1.44 (0.052 lb/in^{3}). The polymer owes its high strength to the many inter-chain bonds. These inter-molecular hydrogen bonds form between the carbonyl groups and NH centers. Additional strength is derived from aromatic stacking interactions between adjacent strands. These interactions have a greater influence on Kevlar than the van der Waals interactions and chain length that typically influence the properties of other synthetic polymers and fibers such as ultra-high-molecular-weight polyethylene. The presence of salts and certain other impurities, especially calcium, could interfere with the strand interactions and care is taken to avoid inclusion in its production. Kevlar's structure consists of relatively rigid molecules which tend to form mostly planar sheet-like structures rather like silk protein.

== Thermal properties ==
Kevlar maintains its strength and resilience down to cryogenic temperatures (−196 °C (−320.8 °F)): in fact, it is slightly stronger at low temperatures. At higher temperatures the tensile strength is immediately reduced by about 10–20%, and after some hours the strength progressively reduces further. For example: enduring 160 °C (320 °F) for 500 hours, its strength is reduced by about 10%; and enduring 260 °C (500 °F) for 70 hours, its strength is reduced by about 50%.

== Applications ==
=== Science ===
Kevlar is often used in the field of cryogenics for its low thermal conductivity and high strength relative to other materials for suspension purposes. It is most often used to suspend a paramagnetic salt enclosure from a superconducting magnet mandrel in order to minimize any heat leaks to the paramagnetic material. It is also used as a thermal standoff or structural support where low heat leaks are desired.

A thin Kevlar window has been used by the NA48 experiment at CERN to separate a vacuum vessel from a vessel at nearly atmospheric pressure, both 192 cm (76 in) in diameter. The window has provided vacuum tightness combined with reasonably small amount of material (only 0.3% to 0.4% of radiation length).

=== Protection ===
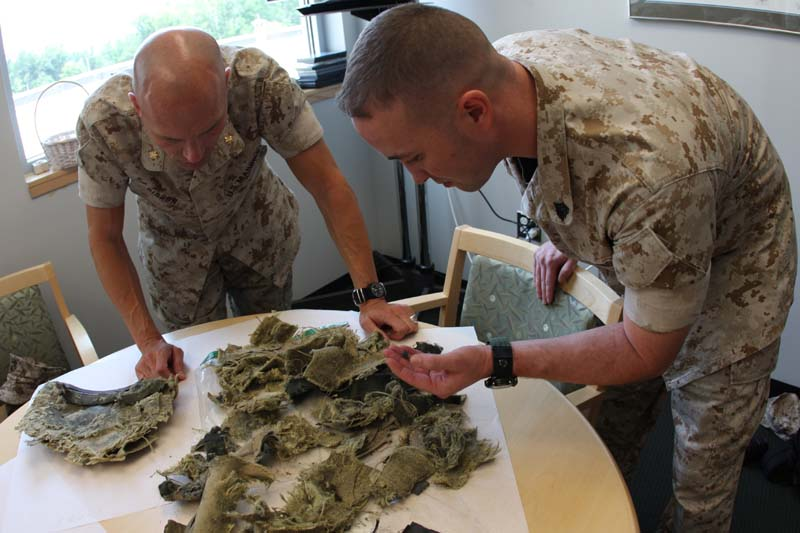
Pieces of a Kevlar helmet used to help absorb the blast of a grenade

Kevlar is a well-known component of personal armor such as combat helmets, ballistic face masks, and ballistic vests. The PASGT helmet and vest that were used by United States military forces relied on Kevlar as a key component in their construction. Other military uses include bulletproof face masks and spall liners used to protect the crews of armoured fighting vehicles. Nimitz-class aircraft carriers use Kevlar reinforcement in vital areas. Civilian applications include high heat resistance uniforms worn by firefighters and body armour worn by police officers, security, and police tactical teams such as SWAT.

Kevlar is used in gloves, sleeves, jackets, chaps and other articles of clothing designed to protect users from cuts, abrasions, and heat. Kevlar-based protective gear is often considerably lighter and thinner than equivalent gear made of more traditional materials.

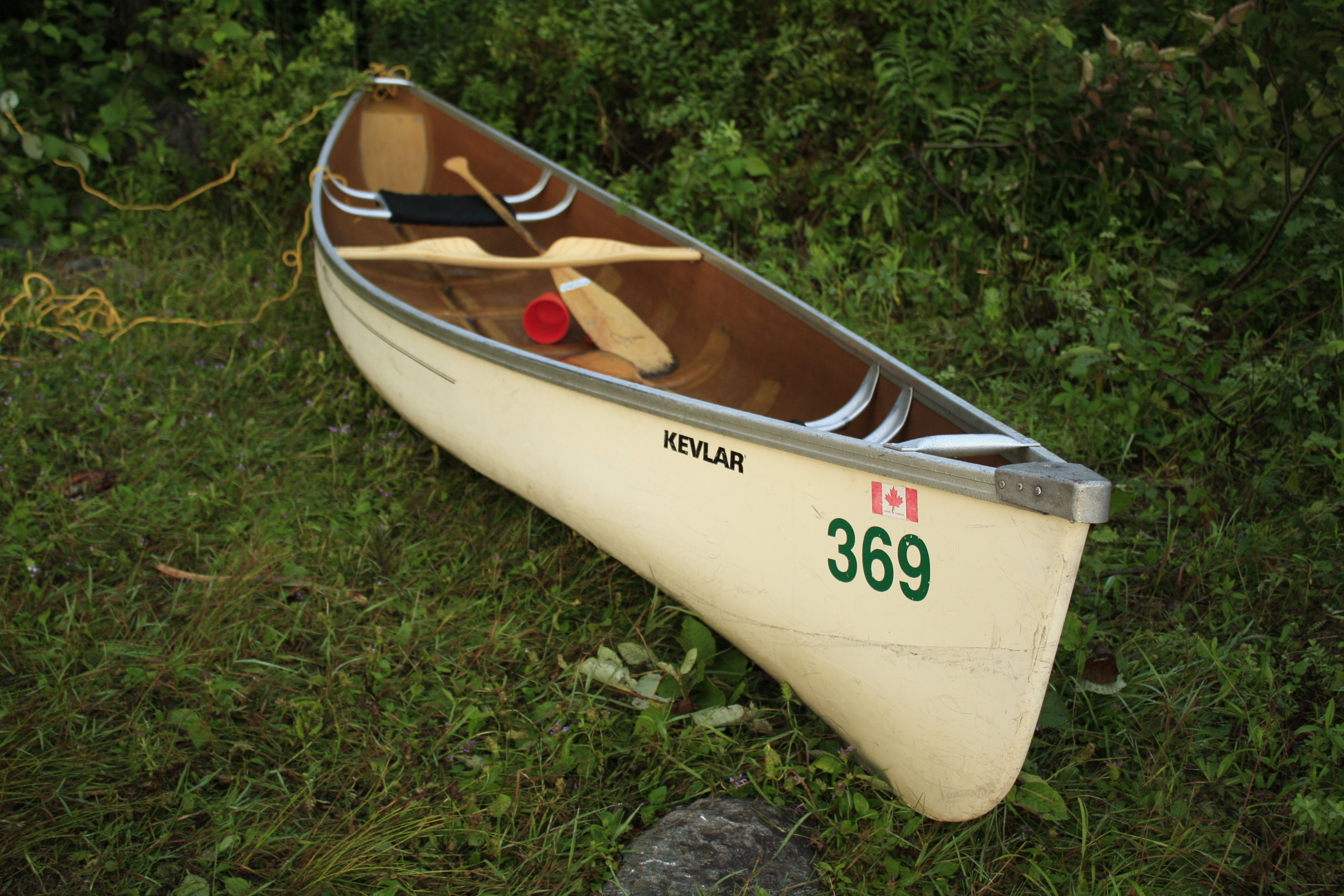
Kevlar is a very popular material for racing canoes.

It is used in motorcycle safety clothing, especially in the areas featuring padding such as the shoulders and elbows. In the sport of fencing it is used in the protective jackets, breeches, plastrons and the bib of the masks. It is increasingly being used in the peto, the padded covering that protects picadors' horses in the bullring. Speed skaters also frequently wear an under-layer of Kevlar fabric to prevent potential wounds from skates in the event of a fall or collision.

=== Sport ===
In kyudo, or Japanese archery, it may be used for bow strings, as an alternative to the more expensive hemp. It is one of the main materials used for paraglider suspension lines. It is used as an inner lining for some bicycle tires to prevent punctures. In table tennis, plies of Kevlar are added to custom ply blades, or paddles, in order to increase bounce and reduce weight. Tennis racquets are sometimes strung with Kevlar. It is used in sails for high performance racing boats.

In 2013, with advancements in technology, Nike used Kevlar in shoes for the first time. It launched the Elite II Series, with enhancements to its earlier version of basketball shoes by using Kevlar in the anterior as well as the shoe laces. This was done to decrease the elasticity of the tip of the shoe in contrast to the nylon conventionally used, as Kevlar expanded by about 1% against nylon which expanded by about 30%. Shoes in this range included LeBron, HyperDunk and Zoom Kobe VII. However these shoes were launched at a price range much higher than average cost of basketball shoes. It was also used in the laces for the Adidas F50 adiZero Prime football boot.

Several companies, including Continental AG, manufacture cycle tires with Kevlar to protect against punctures.

Folding-bead bicycle tires, introduced to cycling by The Michelin Elan tire in 1975, along with Mavic "Module E" hook-beaded rims, used Kevlar as a bead in place of steel for weight reduction and strength. A side effect of the folding bead is a reduction in shelf and floor space needed to display cycle tires in a retail environment, as they are folded and placed in small boxes.

=== Music ===
Kevlar has also been found to have useful acoustic properties for loudspeaker cones, specifically for bass and mid range drive units. Additionally, Kevlar has been used as a strength member in fiber optic cables such as the ones used for audio data transmissions.

Kevlar can be used as an acoustic core on bows for string instruments. Kevlar's physical properties provide strength, flexibility, and stability for the bow's user. To date, the only manufacturer of this type of bow is CodaBow.

Kevlar is also presently used as a material for tailcords (tailpiece adjusters), which connect the tailpiece to the endpin of bowed string instruments.

Kevlar is sometimes used as a material on marching snare drums. It allows for an extremely high amount of tension, resulting in a cleaner sound. There is usually a resin poured onto the Kevlar to make the head airtight, and a nylon top layer to provide a flat striking surface. This is one of the primary types of marching snare drum heads. Remo's Falam Slam patch is made with Kevlar and is used to reinforce bass drum heads where the beater strikes.

Kevlar is used in the woodwind reeds of Fibracell. The material of these reeds is a composite of aerospace materials designed to duplicate the way nature constructs cane reed. Very stiff but sound absorbing Kevlar fibers are suspended in a lightweight resin formulation.

=== Motor vehicles ===
Kevlar is sometimes used in structural components of cars, especially high-value performance cars such as the Ferrari F40.

The chopped fiber has been used as a replacement for asbestos in brake pads. Aramids such as Kevlar release less airborne fibres than asbestos brakes and do not have the carcinogenic properties associated with asbestos.

=== Other uses ===
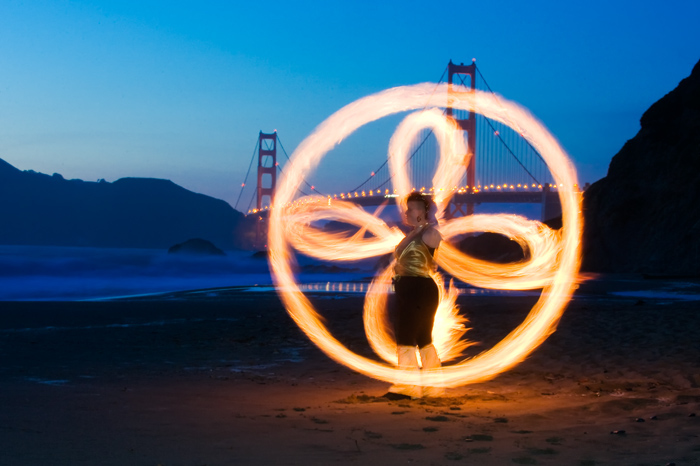
Fire poi on a beach in San Francisco

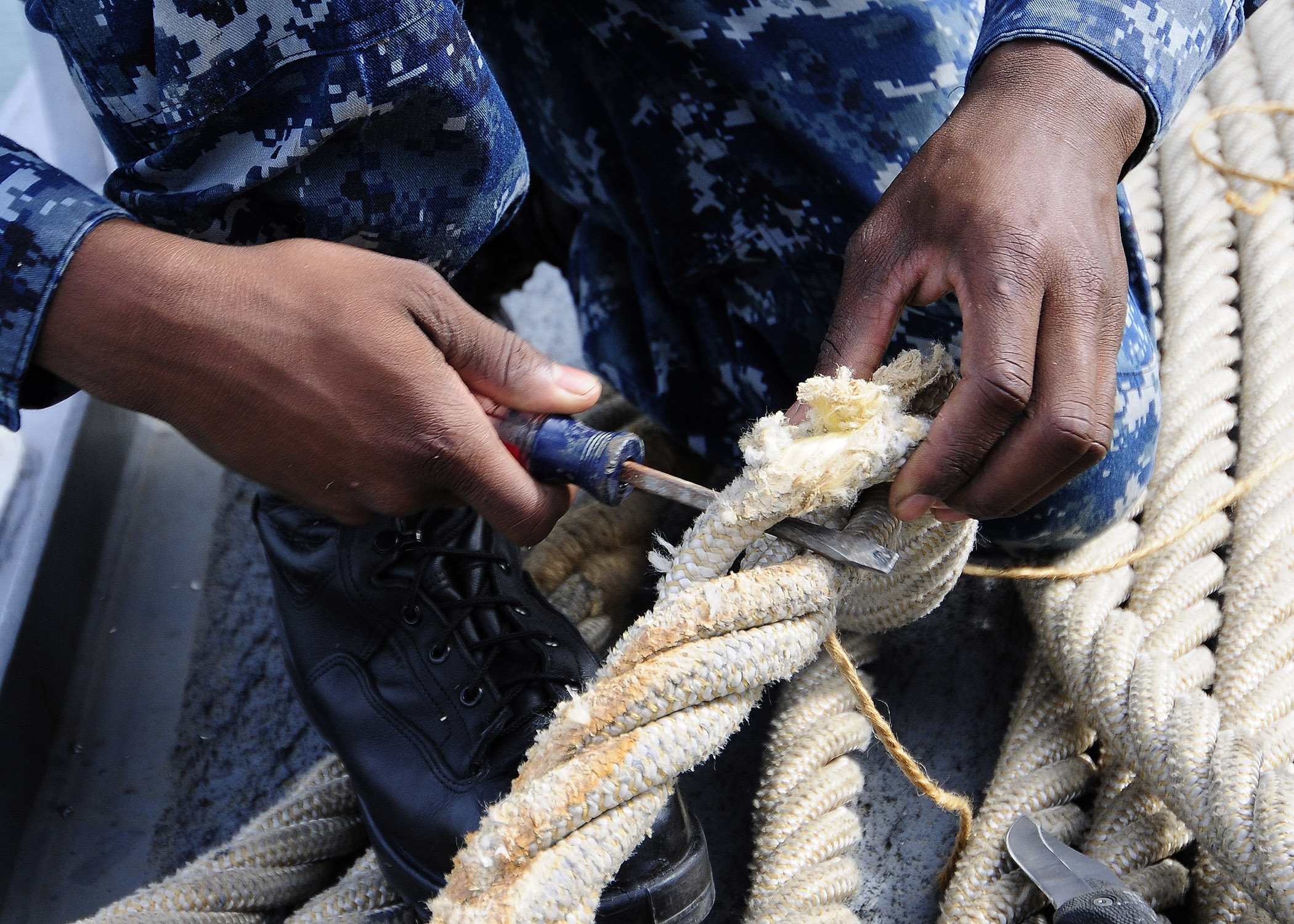
Kevlar mooring line

Wicks for fire dancing props are made of composite materials with Kevlar in them. Kevlar by itself does not absorb fuel very well, so it is blended with other materials such as fiberglass or cotton. Kevlar's high heat resistance allows the wicks to be reused many times.

Kevlar is sometimes used as a substitute for Teflon in some non-stick frying pans.

Kevlar fiber is used in rope and in cable, where the fibers are kept parallel within a polyethylene sleeve. The cables have been used in suspension bridges such as the bridge at Aberfeldy, Scotland. They have also been used to stabilize cracking concrete cooling towers by circumferential application followed by tensioning to close the cracks. Kevlar is widely used as a protective outer sheath for optical fiber cable, as its strength protects the cable from damage and kinking. When used in this application it is commonly known by the trademarked name Parafil.

Kevlar was used by scientists at Georgia Institute of Technology as a base textile for an experiment in electricity-producing clothing. This was done by weaving zinc oxide nanowires into the fabric. If successful, the new fabric will generate about 80 milliwatts per square meter.

A retractable roof of over 60,000 sq ft (5,600 m^{2}) of Kevlar was a key part of the design of the Olympic Stadium, Montreal for the 1976 Summer Olympics. It was spectacularly unsuccessful, as it was completed 10 years late and replaced just 10 years later in May 1998 after a series of problems.

Kevlar can be found as a reinforcing layer in rubber bellows expansion joints and rubber hoses, for use in high temperature applications, and for its high strength. It is also found as a braid layer used on the outside of hose assemblies, to add protection against sharp objects.

Some cellphones (including the Motorola RAZR Family, the Motorola Droid Maxx, OnePlus 2 and Pocophone F1) have a Kevlar backplate, chosen over other materials such as carbon fiber due to its resilience and lack of interference with signal transmission.

The Kevlar fiber/epoxy matrix composite materials can be used in marine current turbines (MCT) or wind turbines due to their high specific strength and light weight compared to other fibers.

== Composite materials ==
Aramid fibers are widely used for reinforcing composite materials, often in combination with carbon fiber and glass fiber. The matrix for high performance composites is usually epoxy resin. Typical applications include monocoque bodies for Formula 1 cars, helicopter rotor blades, tennis, table tennis, badminton and squash rackets, kayaks, cricket bats, and field hockey, ice hockey and lacrosse sticks.

Kevlar 149, the strongest fiber and most crystalline in structure, is an alternative in certain parts of aircraft construction. The wing leading edge is one application, Kevlar being less prone than carbon or glass fiber to break in bird collisions.

== See also ==
- Innegra S
- Ultra-high-molecular-weight polyethylene
- Twaron
- Vectran
