= Sailcloth =

Strong fabric of the type used to make ships' sails

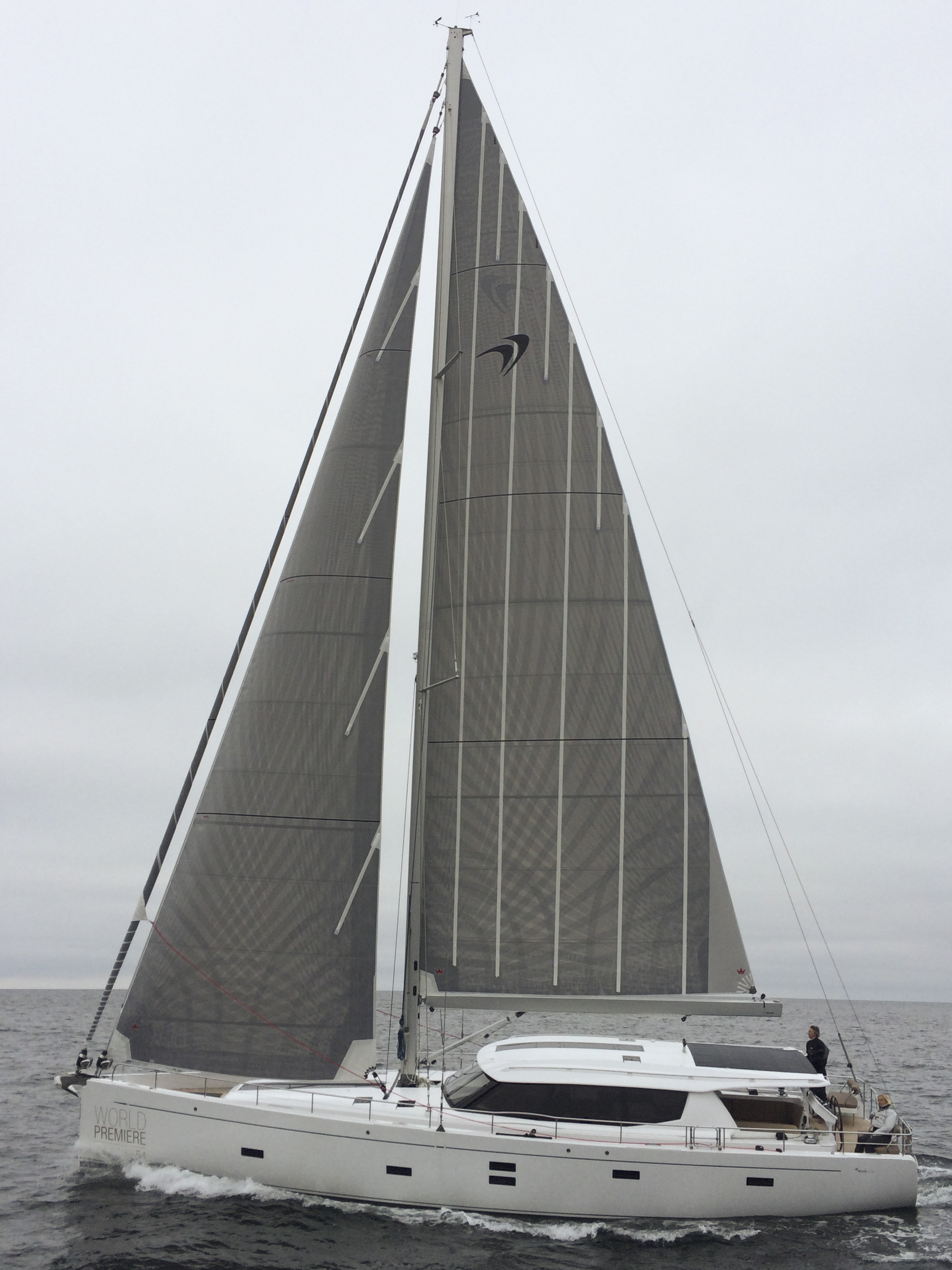
Sails made with synthetic fibers.

Sailcloth is cloth used to make sails. It can be made of a variety of materials, including natural fibers such as flax, hemp, wool, or cotton in various forms of sail canvas, and synthetic fibers such as nylon, polyester, aramids, and carbon fibers in various woven, spun, and molded textiles.

== History ==
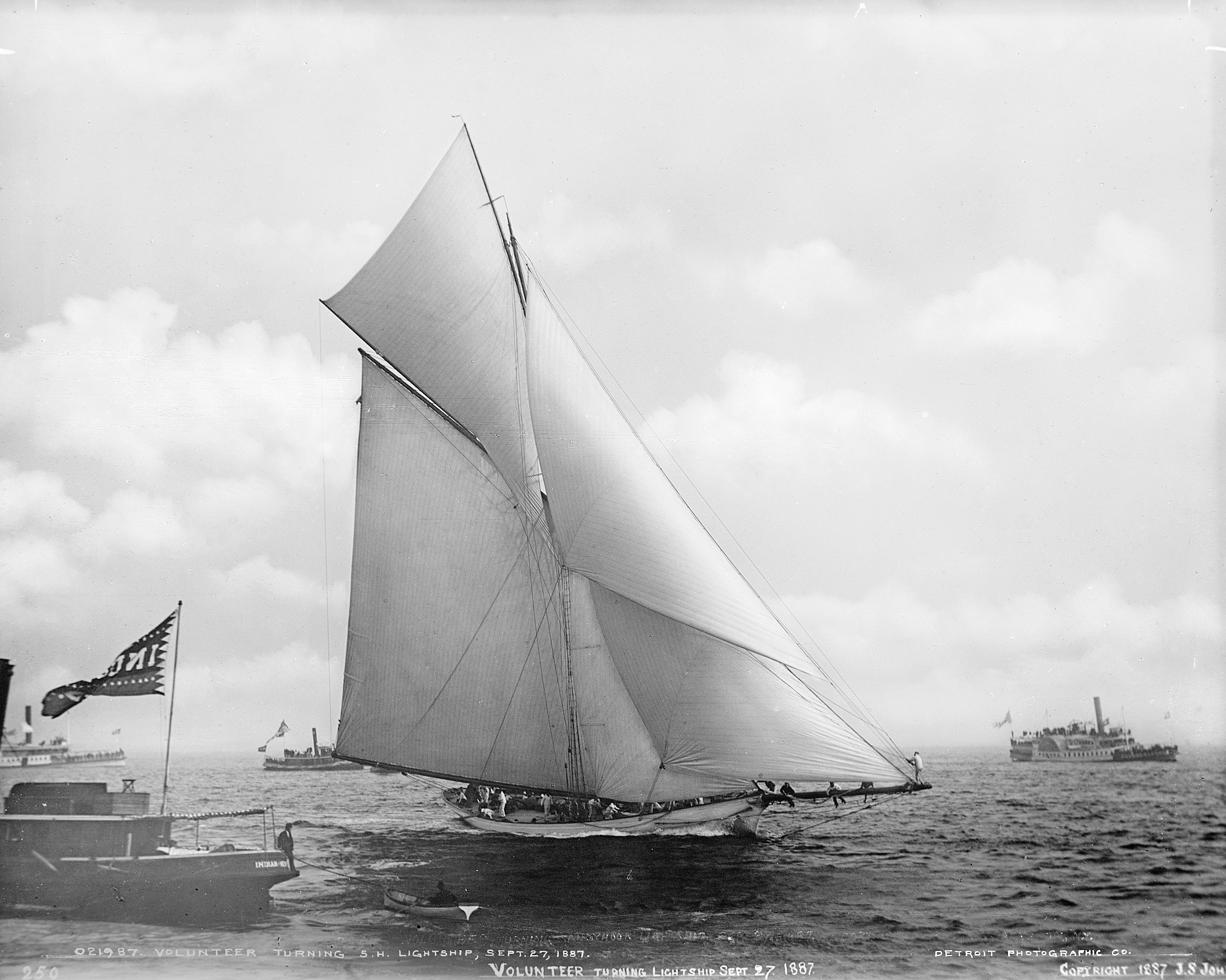
Volunteer wins the America's Cup in 1887 with cotton sails

=== Western traditions ===
Viking longships used wool for sailcloth. The cloth was woven in one of three ways, according to locality and tradition: plain weave with individual threads going over and under each other, three-shaft twill with two threads going over and under at each cross thread, and four-shaft twill with thread interwoven with two threads at a time in either direction. Such was the practice from the 11th through the 14th centuries.

Doek is Dutch for cloth, which evolved into the English word "duck" in reference to sail canvas. Duck was typically made from cotton or linen (flax), with some use of hemp. These natural fibers have poor resistance to rot, UV light and water absorption. Linen is stronger, but cotton is lighter. Linen was the traditional fiber of sails until it was supplanted by cotton during the 19th century. At first cotton was used as a matter of necessity in the United States as it was indigenous and the supply of flax was periodically interrupted by wars such as the War of 1812, during which demand for sailcloth for military use was high. As sail size grew linen was too heavy to be practical so cotton became more popular. Cotton did not substantially replace linen worldwide until the end of the age of sail; however, in some cases the strength of linen was preferred for some types of sails. It was not until the late 20th century that natural fibers were replaced by synthetics in mainstream use. Cotton sailcloth is still used for sportswear, upholstery and draperies. The traditional width for carded cotton sailcloth in the US was 23 inches (58 cm) while the British standard was 24 inches (61 cm).

=== Austronesian traditions ===
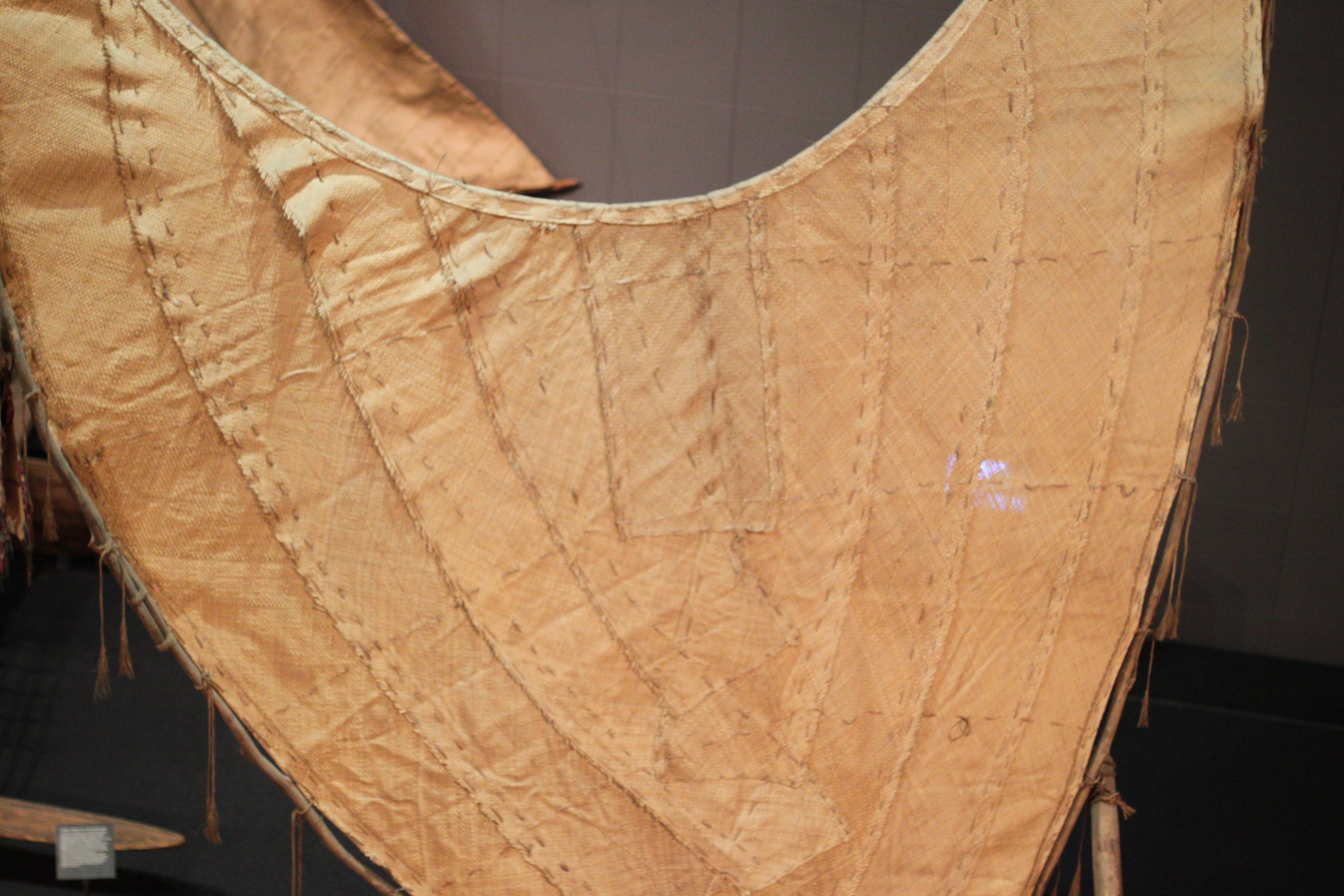
Sails made from woven mats of pandan leaves on a tepukei from Taumako, Solomon Islands

In the ancient seafaring traditions of the Austronesian peoples of the Indo-Pacific, the sails were traditionally made from woven panels of pandan (screw pine) leaves and lashed with ropes usually made from coconut coir. These sails were integral in the subsequent migrations (c. 3000 to 1500 BCE) of the Austronesians from Taiwan, to Island Southeast Asia, Micronesia, Island Melanesia, Polynesia, and Madagascar. Some examples of pandan mat sails were so finely woven that they were compared to "coarse linen" by the Spanish and "dressed sheepskin" by the Dutch.

Specific examples of sails made from pandan mats in Austronesian-speaking regions include the sails of the fayang rafts of the Amis people in Taiwan, the various bangka of the Philippines, the kabang of the Moken people, the wa of the Caroline Islands and Yap, the tepukei of the Taumako Islands, the oblong sails of the canoes of the Ninigo Islands, the baurua of the Gilbert Islands, the drua of Fiji, and the waʻa kaulua of Hawaiʻi, among others. The technology of pandan mat sails were also introduced to non-Austronesian peoples via contact, like to the Yolngu of Australia.

Sails could also be made from woven mats of other similar plant leaves and fibers, including those from sugar palms, buri palms, and nipa palms.

== Modern fibers ==
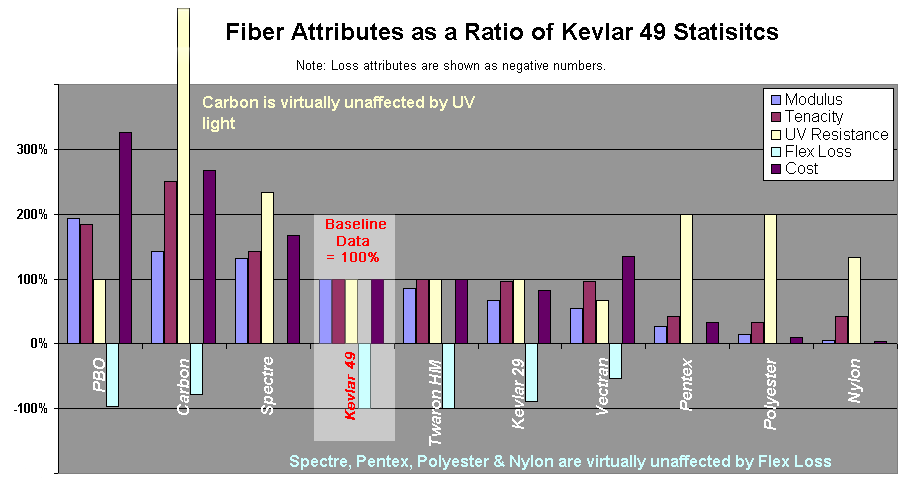
Comparison of attributes of sailcloth fibers

The characteristics of a sail are due to design, construction and the attributes of the fibers, which are woven together to make the sail cloth. The following sections discuss the attributes of fibers assuming a good design and careful construction. According to Mahr, there are six key factors in evaluating a fiber for suitability in weaving a sail-cloth:

- Initial modulus – The ability to resist stretching. Higher resistance is better for upwind sails.
- Breaking strength – Measured as a force per cross sectional area of fiber. Higher is better for sails.
- Creep – Describes the long term stretch of a fiber or fabric. A material with creep may have a superior modulus, but lose its shape over time.
- Resistance to ultraviolet light – Strength loss from exposure to the Sun’s UV rays measured by a standardized exposure test.
- Flex strength – Strength lost due to bending, folding, or flogging, which is frequently measured with an industry standard 50 fold test.
- Cost-effectiveness –Both the initial cost and its durability of the material define its cost-effectiveness over time.

There is no perfect solution since in most cases the increase of one attribute generally results in the decreased attractiveness of another. Reduced stretch generally also reduces the flexibility causing a trade-off of performance for durability. Solving both problems generally sends the price out of range for most sailors.

=== Nylon ===
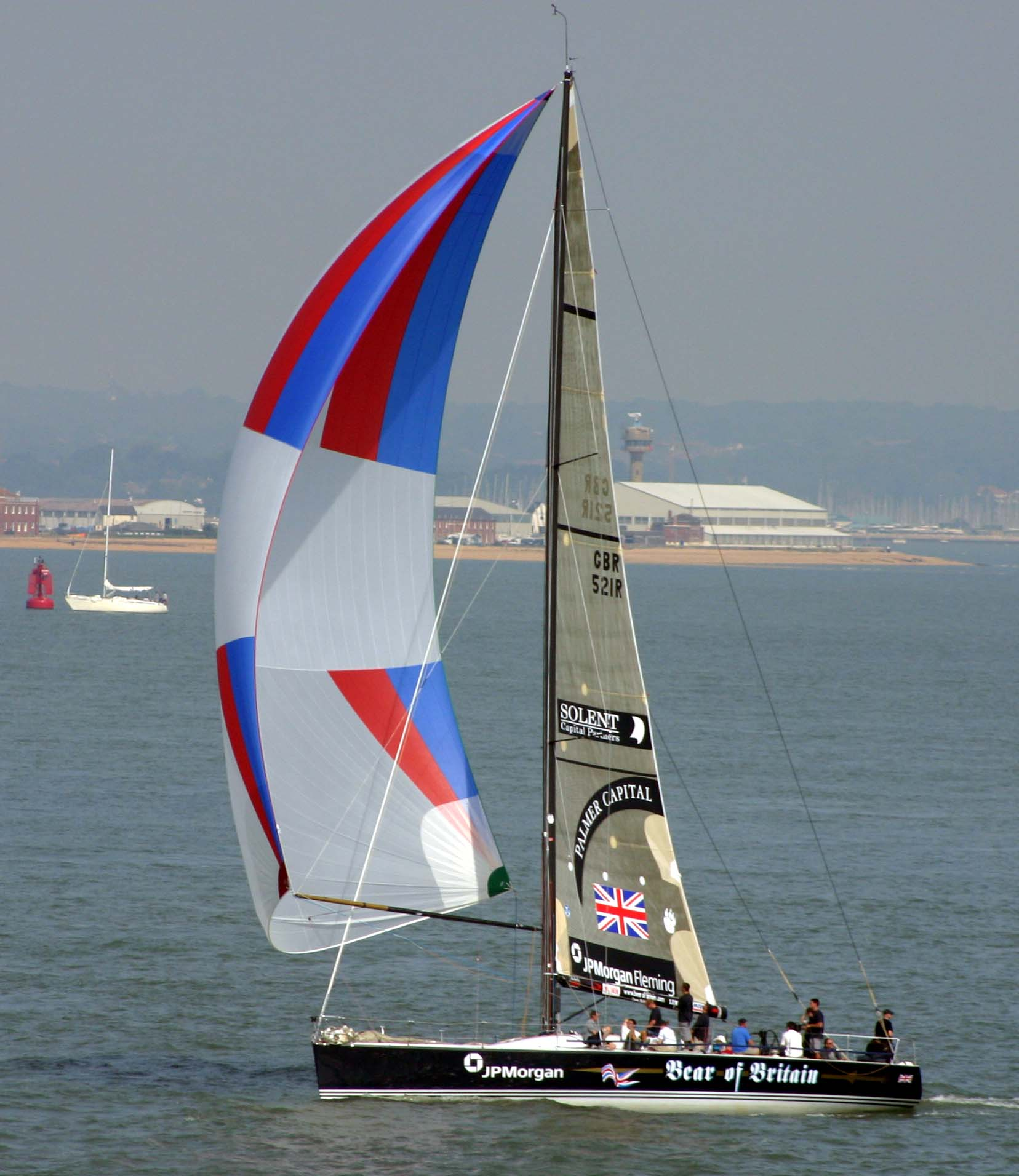
Spinnaker, made of nylon because of its light weight and high strength.

Nylon is used in spinnakers because of its light weight, high tensile strength, superior abrasion resistance and flexibility. However, it has a low modulus allowing too much stretch to be suitable for upwind sails. Nylon is more susceptible to UV and chemical degradation than polyesters and its physical properties can change due to moisture absorption.

=== Polyester (PET) ===
Polyethylene terephthalate, the most common type of polyester, is the most common fiber used in sailcloth; it is also commonly referred to by the brand name Dacron. PET has excellent resiliency, high abrasion resistance, high UV resistance, high flex strength and low cost. Low absorbency allows the fiber to dry quickly. PET has been replaced by stronger fibers for most serious racing applications, but remains the most popular sail cloth due to lower price and high durability. Dacron is the brand name of Dupont’s Type 52 high modulus fiber made specifically for sailcloth. Allied Signal has produced a fiber called 1W70 polyester that has a 27% higher tenacity than Dacron. Other trade names include Terylene, Tetoron, Trevira and Diolen.

=== PEN fiber (Pentex) ===
PEN (Polyethylene naphthalate), commonly known by Honeywell's trade name "Pentex", is another kind of polyester fiber, which stretches only 40% as much as standard PET fibers, but about twice as much as Kevlar 29. Because it only shrinks about a third as much as a good PET, PEN can not be woven as tightly; thus, woven PEN must be impregnated with resin making sails prone to damage from improper use and handling. PEN is better suited for making laminated sailcloth, where the fibers are laid straight for strength and are bonded to sheets of film for stability (e.g., PET film often called by one of its trade names Mylar), or as a taffeta outer layer of a laminate, protecting a PET film. PEN laminates are an economical alternative for higher performance sail.

=== Kevlar ===
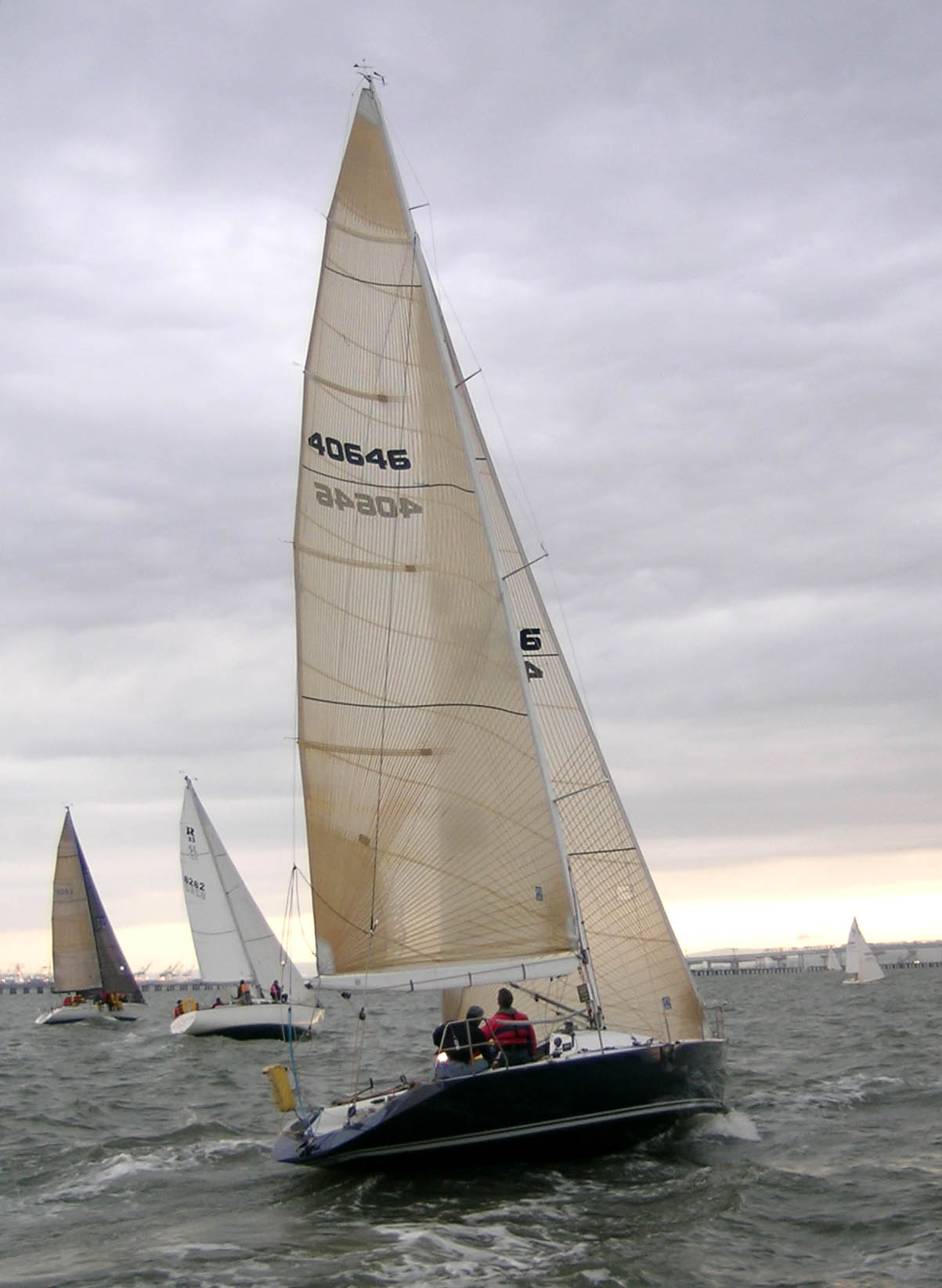
Aramid (Kevlar) sails, showing the typical color of the fabric.

Kevlar, an aramid fiber, has become the predominant fiber for racing sails, since it was introduced by DuPont in 1971. It is stronger, has a higher strength to weight ratio than steel, and has a modulus that is five times greater than PET, and about twice as high as PEN. There are two popular types of Kevlar: Type 29 and Type 49, the latter having a 50% higher initial modulus than Type 29 but a lower flex loss. DuPont has developed higher modulus Types 129, 149 and 159, but these have seen little use in sails, since generally as the modulus increases the flex strength decreases. DuPont has recently introduced Kevlar Edge, a fiber developed specifically for sails with 25% higher flex strength and a higher modulus than Kevlar 49. Kevlar, along with other aramid fibers, have poor UV resistance (Kevlar loses strength roughly twice as quickly in sunlight as PET) and rapid loss of strength with flexing, folding and flogging. Minimal flogging and careful handling can greatly extend the life of a Kevlar sail.

=== Technora ===
Technora is an aramid, which is produced in Japan by Teijin, has a slightly lower modulus strength than Kevlar 29 but a slightly higher resistance to flex fatigue. The fiber’s lower UV resistance is enhanced by dyeing the naturally gold fiber black. Technora is most often used as bias support (X-ply) in laminate sailcloth.

=== Twaron ===
Twaron is an aramid, which is produced in The Netherlands by Teijin, is chemically and physically similar to DuPont’s Kevlar. Twaron HM (High modulus) has similar stretch properties to Kevlar 49, greater tensile strength and better UV resistance. Twaron SM is similar to Kevlar 29. Like Kevlar, the fiber is a bright gold color.

=== Spectra ===
Spectra is an ultra-high-molecular-weight polyethylene (UHMWPE) made by Honeywell, which offers superior UV resistance (on par with PET), very high initial modulus numbers (second only to high modulus Carbon Fiber), superior breaking strength, and high flex strength. However, it also exhibits permanent and continuous elongation under a sustained load (AKA: creep). This results in a change in shape as the sail ages. Because of this Spectra is only used in spinnakers on high performance boats where the sails are replaced regularly.

=== Dyneema ===
Equivalent to Spectra, Dyneema is an extremely strong fiber produced by the Dutch company DSM. It is often used by European sailcloth manufacturers, is available in a wider variety of yarn sizes than Spectra, and is growing in popularity. Dyneema DSK78 set a new standard combining the typical high strength to weight ratio, excellent low stretch, abrasion, and UV resistance but added three times better creep performance compared to Dyneema SK75 and nearly two times better than Dyneema SK90.

=== Certran ===
Hoechst Celanese produces Certran polyethylene similar to Spectra, with about one half the modulus rating of Spectra. It has similar properties to Spectra including superior resistance to flex fatigue and UV degradation but also exhibits creep.

=== Zylon (PBO) ===
PBO (Poly (p-phenylene-2, 6-benzobisoxazole)) is liquid crystal polymer developed by Japan-based Toyobo under the trade name Zylon. It is a gold fiber with an initial modulus that is significantly higher than other high modulus yarns, including aramids. Among PBO's desirable properties are high thermal stability, low creep, high chemical resistance, high cut and abrasion resistance, and excellent resistance to stretch after repeated folding. PBO is also quite flexible and has a soft feel. But PBOs have poor resistance to both UV and visible light.

=== Vectran ===
Vectran is a polyester-based high performance LCP (liquid crystal polymer) produced by Ticona. It is naturally gold in color and has a modulus similar to Kevlar 29, but has less strength loss with flex. This is a benefit in endurance applications and for cruising sails where durability is key. Additional advantages of Vectran fiber has a 0.02% creep at 30% of max load after 10 000 hours, high chemical and abrasion resistance and high tensile strength. The UV endurance is inferior to PET and PEN, but the degradation levels off after roughly 400 hours of exposure, while the Aramids and Spectra continue to degrade.

=== Carbon fiber ===
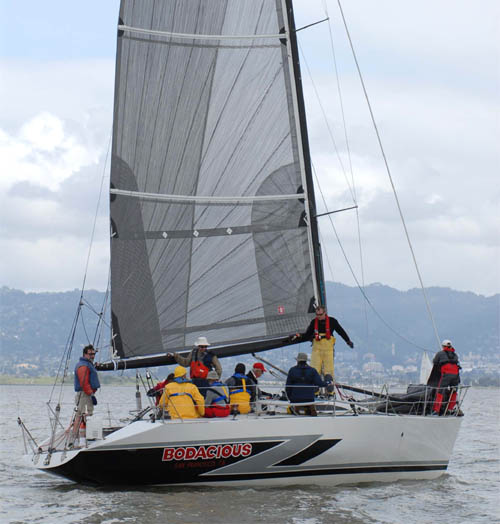
Carbon fiber mainsail, showing grey-scale hues typical of the material.

Carbon fiber is a high modulus synthetic fiber made from carbon atoms. It is virtually unaffected by UV exposure and provides exceptionally low stretch. Variants can balance along a continuum from brittle with no-stretch to extreme durability/flexibility with only slightly more stretch than aramid sails.

== Weaving ==
Combed singles yarn sailcloth in high counts is used for spinnaker and head sails. The count often is 148 by 160 and the fabric is finished at 100 cm (40 in) wide with a length-to-mass ratio of about 13.10 m/kg (6 1/2 yd/lb). The quality and weight of the weave can be more critical than the choice of fibers, since a poor weave can lead to high stretch and poor sail form. Weight is described in ounces, for example "an 8 oz. cloth". This means that an area of 72 cm × 91 cm (28 1/2 in × 36 in) weighs 230 g (8 oz).

Sailcloth is woven in two forms: balanced and unbalanced. The yarns in balanced cloth are the same diameter and weight in lengthwise (the "warp") and across the width of the cloth (the "fill"). Unbalanced means a heavier yarn is used in one direction. Most moderns sails are "crosscut", which is an unbalanced technique where the heavier yarns is in the fill. This allows greater loads to radiate up from the clew (back lower corner) along the leech (back edge). This is especially true of mainsails and high aspect jibs.

Woven sail cloths have an inherent problem with stretch resistance. In a weave the warp and fill yarns pass over and under one another. As load is applied the yarns attempt to straighten out, this results in the fabric stretching, commonly referred to as "crimp". Fibers which are resistant to stretching cannot be woven as tightly as more flexible fibers such as PET, thus the cloth is more affected by crimp.

== Films ==
Films are thin sheet material extruded from synthetic polymers and are typically used along with woven cloth in a laminate (see laminates below).

=== PET ===
PET film is the most common film used in laminated sailcloth. It is an extruded and biaxially oriented version of PET fiber. In the US and Britain, the most well-known trade names are Mylar and Melinex.

=== PEN Film ===
PEN film is extruded and biaxially oriented version of PEN fiber. Just as PEN fiber is stronger than PET fiber, PEN film is stronger than PET film. However, PEN film is rarely used in standard sailcloth styles because it shrinks more rapidly than PET, is less resistant to abuse, and reduces the working life of the sail.

== Scrim and strands ==
Strands are combined from fibers; these are frequently narrow flat bands or ribbons of high strength material. Scrim is a loose weave or lattice of strands, typically bonded where they cross to maintain the grid pattern. Strands and scrims are used to strengthen or reinforce sailcloth (see laminates below).

== Laminated sailcloth ==
In the 1970s sailmakers began to laminate multiple materials with different characteristics to synergize the qualities of each. Using sheets of PET or PEN reduces stretch in all directions, where weaves are most efficient in the direction of the threadlines. Lamination also allow fibers to be placed in a straight, uninterrupted paths. There are four main construction styles:

=== Woven-film-woven ===
Film is sandwiched in between two layers of woven taffeta, the film provides most of the stretch resistance and the taffeta enhances tear and abrasion resistance. The high-end versions of this method use a woven Spectra or Kevlar taffeta. In some newer styles, off threadline aramid yarns, are also laid into the laminate. In some cases the second layer of taffeta is eliminated for cost and weight savings

=== Film-scrim-film or film-insert-film (film-on-film) ===
In this construction, a scrim or strands (inserts) are sandwiched between layers of film. Thus load-bearing members are laid straight, which maximizes the high modulus of the fibers, where a woven material will have some inherent stretch to the weave. Laminating film to film around the strands creates a very strong and dependable bond reducing the amount of adhesive needed. In high quality cloth, the strands or scrim are tensioned during the lamination process.

The drawbacks are: film is not as abrasion or flex resistant as a weave, it does not protect the structural fibers from UV rays. In some cases UV protection is added.

=== Woven-film-scrim-film-woven ===
Woven fabric with high UV and abrasion protection is added to the film-on-film. This combines the best of the above, but is costly, heavy, and stiff. This is an attractive method to combine high modulus fibers with poor UV resistance.

=== Woven/scrim/woven ===
Wovens on both sides of a scrim without the film layer. The problem is getting enough high modulus yarn into the sandwich, and still being able to get a good bond, because, dissimilar fabrics don’t often bond well. This technique is more experimental than practical, but may yield results in time.

== See also ==
- Effort on sail
- Oilcloth
