= Reinforced thermoplastic pipe =

High pressure pipe

Reinforced thermoplastic pipe (RTP) is a type of pipe reinforced using a high strength synthetic fibre such as glass, aramid or carbon. It was initially developed in the early 1990s by Wavin Repox, Akzo Nobel and by Tubes d'Aquitaine from France, who developed the first pipes reinforced with synthetic fibre to replace medium pressure steel pipes in response to growing demand for non-corrosive conduits for application in the onshore oil and gas industry, particularly in the Middle East. Typically, the materials used in the construction of the pipe might be Polyethylene (PE), Polyamide-11 or PVDF and may be reinforced with Aramid or Polyester fibre although other combinations are used. More recently the technology of producing such pipe, including the marketing, rests with a few key companies, where it is available in coils up to 400 m (1,312 ft) length. These pipes are available in pressure ratings from 30 to 90 bar (3 to 9 MPa; 435 to 1,305 psi). Over the last few years this type of pipe has been acknowledged as a standard alternative solution to steel for oilfield flowline applications by certain oil companies and operators. An advantage of this pipe is also its very fast installation time compared to steel pipe when considering the welding time as average speeds up to 1,000 m (3,281 ft)/day have been reached installing RTP in ground surface.

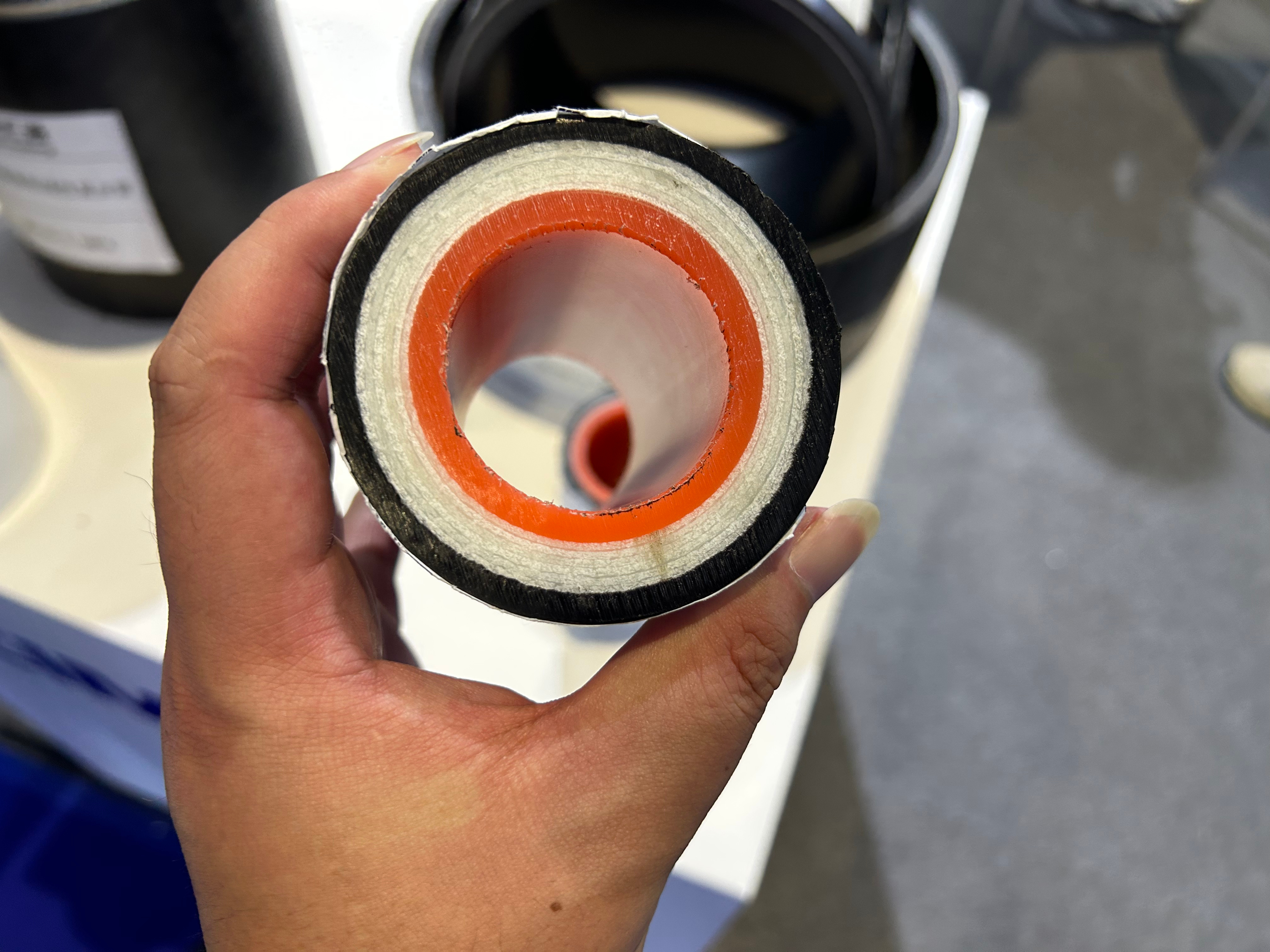
The picture shows the structure of reinforced thermoplastic pipes

Primarily, the pipe provides benefit to applications where steel may rupture due to corrosion and installation time is an issue.

== Technology and history ==
The idea of synthetic fibre reinforced pipe has origins in the flexible hose and offshore industry where it has been frequently used for applications such as control lines in umbilicals and production flowlines for over 30 years. However, the commercialisation and realisation of a competitive product for the onshore oil industry came from a partnership between Teijin Aramid (supplier of aramid fibre Twaron) and Wavin Repox (manufacturer of reinforced thermoset pipes), where Bert Dalmolen initiated a project to develop such a pipe. He was later employed by Pipelife where a state of the art production line was developed to produce RTP. Pipelife also developed a pipe reinforced with steel wire to achieve even higher pressure ratings of over 150 bar (15 MPa; 2,176 psi) using steel reinforcement. Mr Chevrier (Tubes d'Aquitaine) also developed machinery that could produce such pipes, but was not successful in commercialising RTP.

== See also ==
- Pipeline transport
- Plastic pipework
- Plastic Pressure Pipe Systems
