= Flowfold =

- Industry: Retail
- Founded: 2010
- Founders: Charley Friedman; Devin McNeill
- Headquarters: Gorham, Maine
- Area served: Worldwide
- Key people: Charley Friedman (CEO / Founder); Devin McNeill (Co-Founder)
- Products: Wallets, backpacks, dog leashes, outdoor gear
- Website: flowfold.com

Flowfold is an American brand creating wallets, bags, and other outdoor gear. Their motto is "Minimalist Gear for Everyday Adventures".

== History ==
In 2005, Charles Friedman invented the first Flowfold wallets. In high school at the time, he built prototypes out of scrap sailcloth. Later, when Friedman was attending the University of Maine, he passed the idea on to his company. They then went on to produce and market the product as the Flowfold wallet.

The first Flowfold products were hand-crafted by Friedman himself. In 2010, Lifethereal produced upwards of 500 wallets.

The current Flowfold logo was designed in 2011.

== Current products ==
Flowfold makes a variety of products, notably billfold and trifold wallets. Their newest products include iPad sleeves and laptop cases.

Flowfold's manufactures its products in Scarborough, Maine.
