= Teijin =

Japanese Chemical company

Teijin Limited
- Logo used since 2003

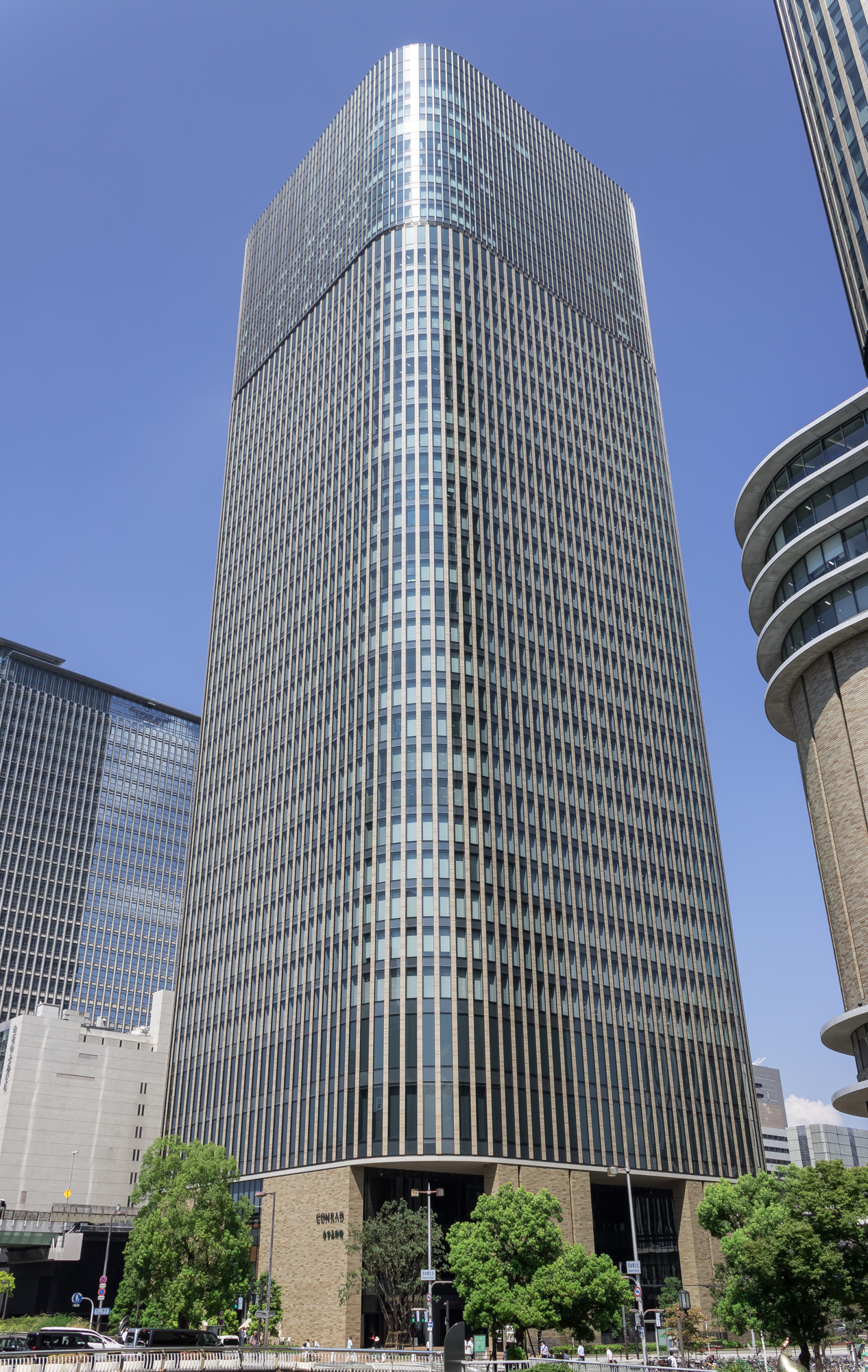
- Headquarters in Kita-ku, Osaka
- Native name: 帝人株式会社
- Romanized name: Teijin Kabushiki-gaisha
- Type: Public (K.K)
- Traded as: TYO: 3401; Nikkei 225 Component
- Industry: Chemicals
- Founded: June 17, 1918; 108 years ago
- Founder: Itsuzō Hata
- Headquarters: Nakanoshima, Kita-ku, Osaka, Japan
- Key people: Akimoto Uchikawa; (president and CEO)
- Products: Products list: Cordley; Panlite; Technora; Teijinconex; Teonex; Tenax; Tetoron; Twaron
- Revenue: ▲$ 7.64 billion (FY 2013) (¥ 784.42 billion) (FY 2013)
- Net income: ▲$ 81.5 million (FY 2013) (¥ 8.35 billion) (FY 2013)
- Number of employees: 21,834; (Japan – 9,634); (World – 12,200); (March 31st, 2024)
- Website: www.teijin.com

Teijin Limited (帝人株式会社, Teijin Kabushiki-gaisha) is a Japanese chemical, pharmaceutical and information technology company. Its main fields of operation are high-performance fibers such as aramid, carbon fibers & composites, healthcare, films, resin & plastic processing, polyester fibers, products converting and IT products.

The company is listed on the first section of the Tokyo Stock Exchange and is a constituent of the Nikkei 225 stock index.

As of March 2014, the Teijin Group comprises 151 companies, 56 in Japan and 95 overseas.

Teijin is a member of the Mitsubishi UFJ Financial Group (MUFJ) keiretsu.

== Business segments and products ==
- Advanced Fibers & Composites Business
  - Aramid fibers
  - High-performance polyethylene (e.g., Endumax branded UHMWPE)
  - High-performance polyester fibers
  - PEN fibers
  - Artificial leather
  - Carbon fiber reinforced composites
  - Flame-resistant fibers
- Electric Materials & Performance Polymer Products Business
  - Polycarbonate resin
  - PEN resin
  - PET film
  - PEN film
  - Processed film
- Healthcare Business
  - Pharmaceuticals in the treatment of bone and joint disease, respiratory disease and cardiovascular and metabolic disease
- IT Business
  - IT services in the healthcare field
  - Total web-based enterprise resource planning (ERP)
  - Digital content management services
  - Content distribution services for mobile phones and smartphones (electronic books, music)
  - E-commerce services
- Products Converting Business
  - Sales and trading of fibrous raw material, apparel, industrial materials and performance polymer products
  - Polyester/Recycled polyester fibers/textiles
  - Closed-loop recycling of polyester products

On October 1, 2026, Teijin Frontier merged with Asahi Kasei Advance to form TA Frontier, a materials trading and manufacturing company owned 80% by Teijin and 20% by Asahi Kasei.

== Gallery ==
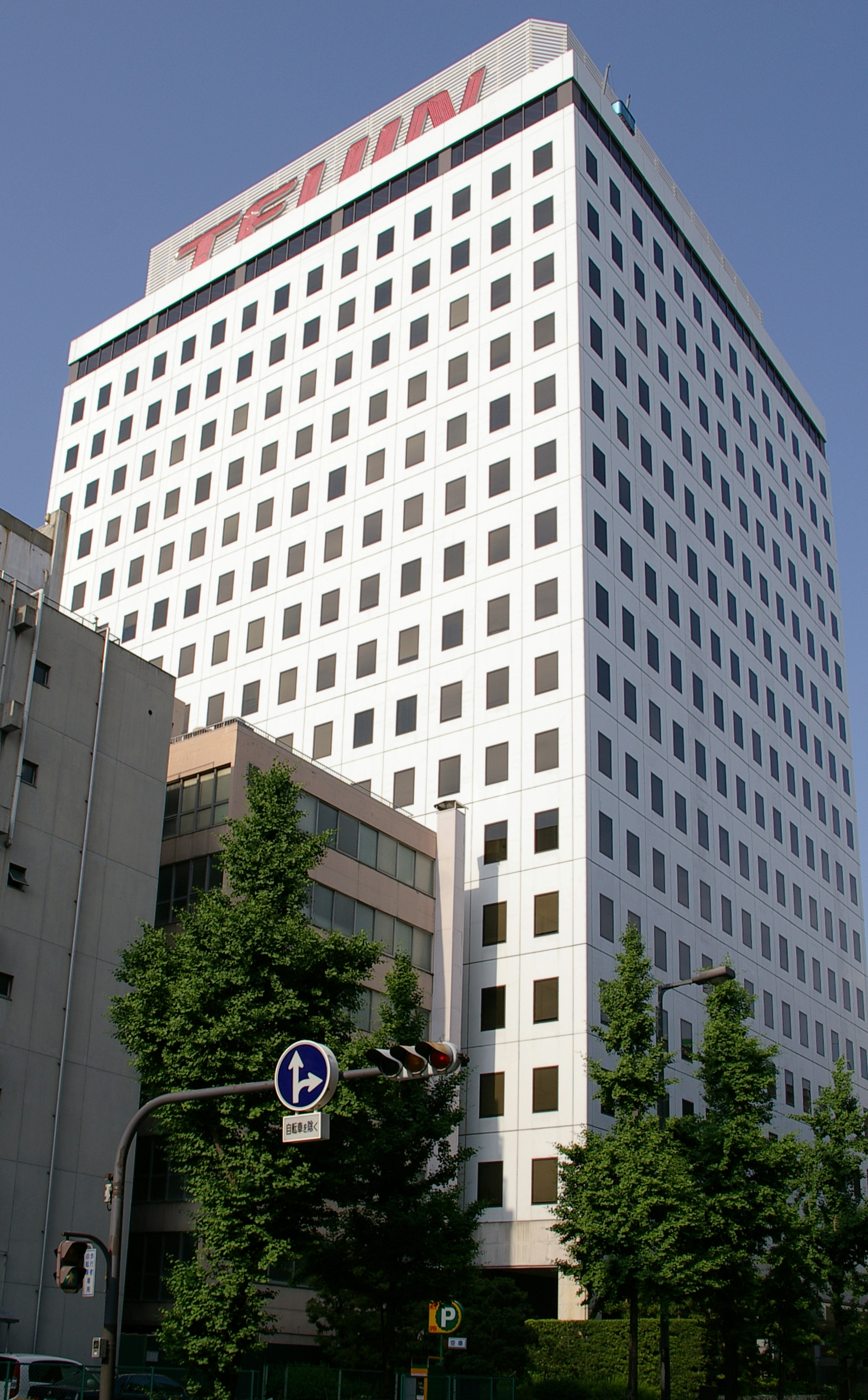
Former headquarters in Chuo-ku, Osaka

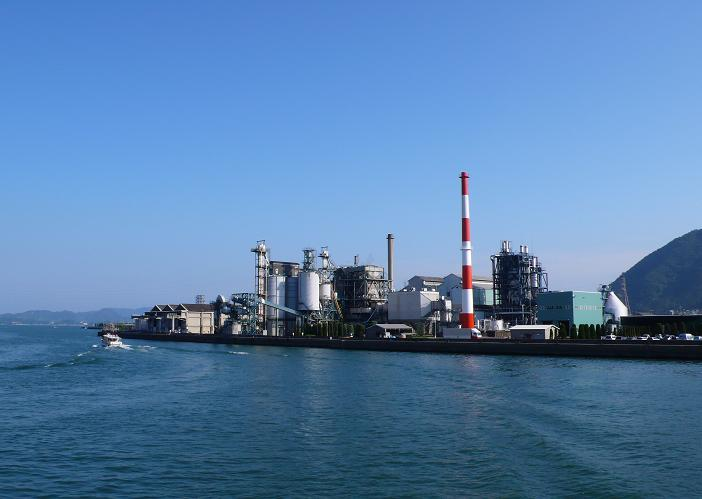
Teijin's plant in Mihara, Hiroshima

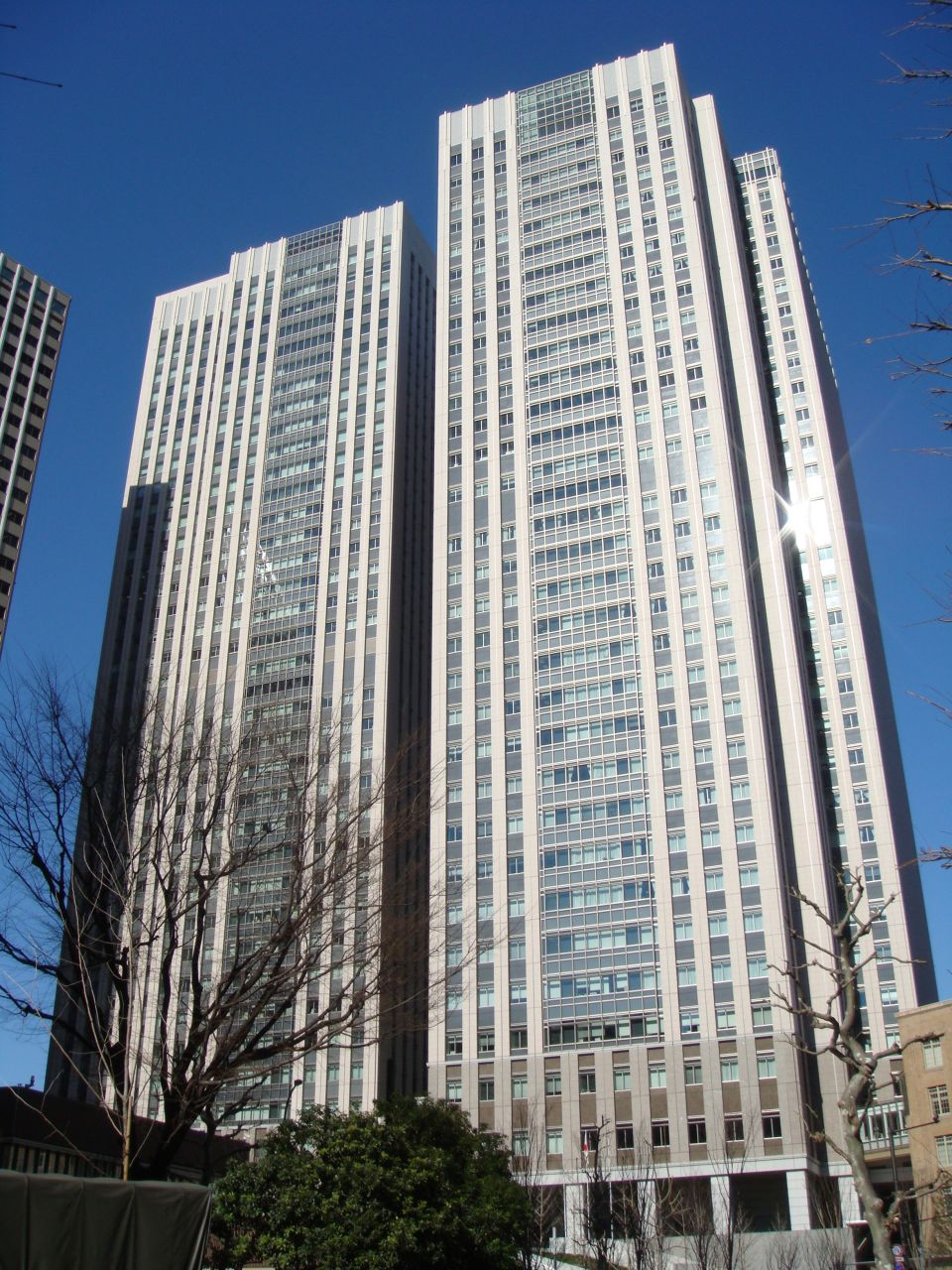
The company's Tokyo offices

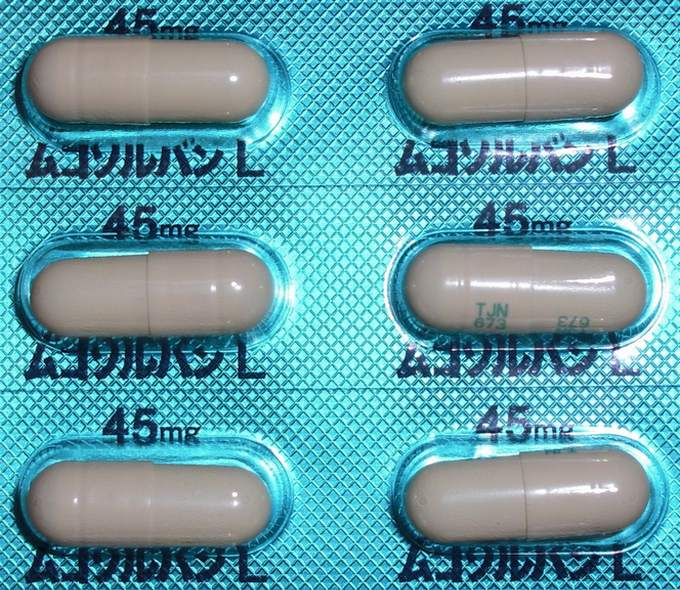
Mucosolvan capsules made by Teijin

== See also ==
- Polycarbonate
- Tenax – carbon fiber
- Teijin Aramid
  - Technora
  - Twaron
- Aramid
- Teijin S.C., former football (soccer) club based in Matsuyama, Ehime Prefecture
