= Continuous fiber reinforced thermoplastic =

Continuous fiber reinforced thermoplastic, is a composite material that contains high-performance continuous fiber, such as carbon fiber, glass fiber, or aramid fiber that is impregnated in a matrix of thermoplastics like polycarbonates. CFRTP is producible into both tape and sheet formats that can later be formed using thermoforming techniques.

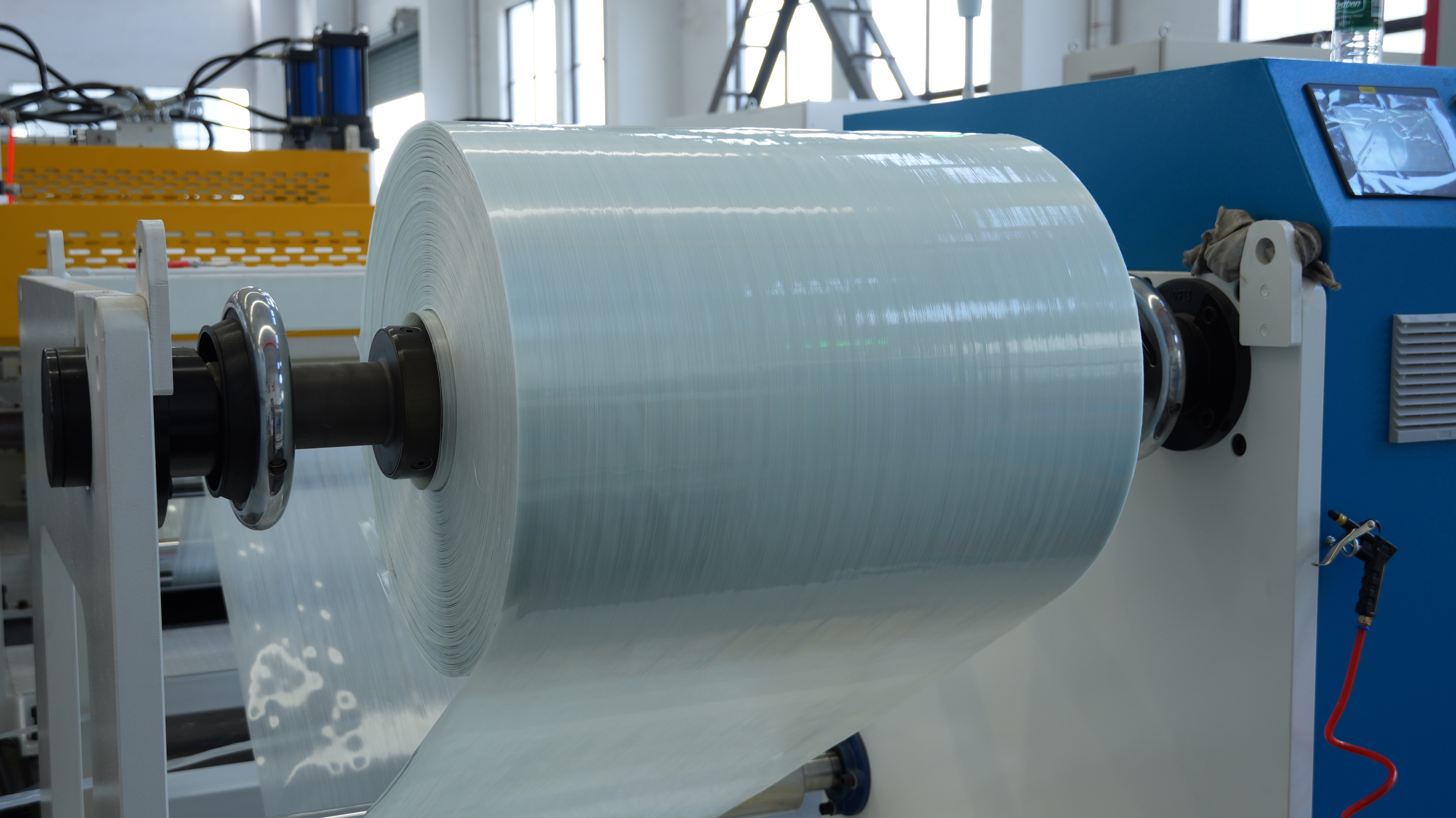
continuous fiberglass reinforced thermoplastic ud tape

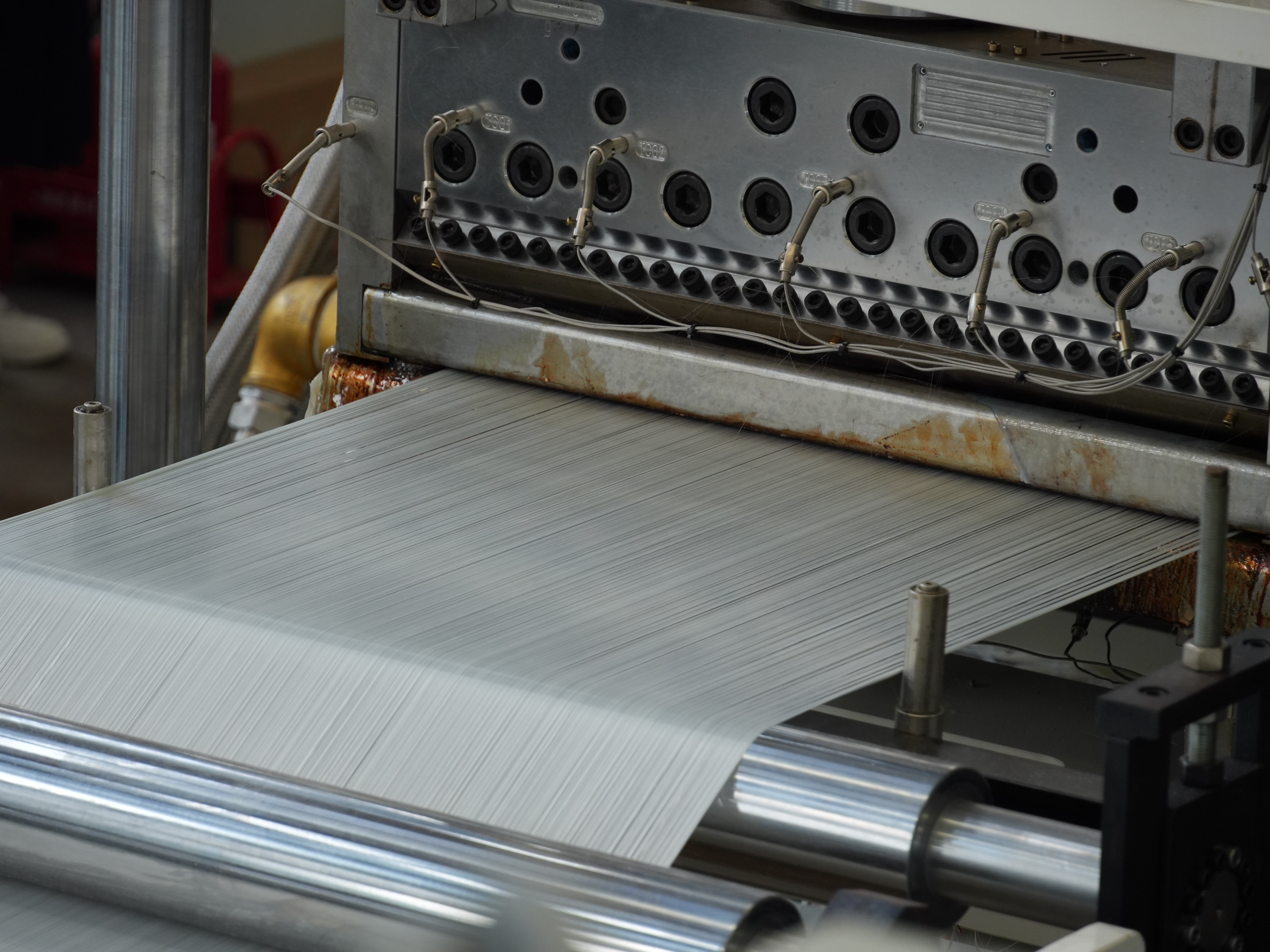
Fiber impregnation
