= Technora =

Aromatic polyamide synthetic fibre

Technora is an aramid that is useful for a variety of applications that require high strength or chemical resistance. It is a brand name of the company Teijin Aramid.

Technora was used on January 25, 2004 to suspend the NASA Mars rover Opportunity from its parachute during descent.

It was also later used by NASA as one of the materials, combined with nylon and Kevlar, making up the parachute that was used to perform a braking manoeuvre during atmospheric entry of the rover Perseverance that landed on Mars on February 18, 2021.

== Production ==
Technora is produced by condensation polymerization of terephthaloyl chloride (TCl) with a mixture of p-phenylenediamine (PPD) and 3,4'-diaminodiphenylether (3,4'-ODA). The polymer is closely related to Teijin Aramids's Twaron or DuPont's Kevlar. Technora is derived from two different diamines, 3,4'-ODA and PPD, whereas Twaron is derived from PPD alone. Because only one amide solvent is used in this very straightforward procedure, spinning can be completed immediately after polymer synthesis.

== Physical properties ==
Technora has a better strength to weight ratio than steel. Technora also has fire resistant properties which can be beneficial.

== See also ==
- Vectran
