= Innegra S =

Brand name of a synthetic polymer yarn

Innegra S is the brandname of Innegra Technologies LLC for a polyolefin (highly oriented; 90+% polypropylene).

== History ==
Work on Innegra began in 2004. A pilot production line was opened in Greer, SC in June 2006

On July 11, 2006 the US Patent Office issued Innegrity LLC a patent entitled “Melt-spun polyolefin multifilament yarn formation processes and yarns formed therefrom".

== Production ==
Innegra S is produced in several sizes noted by their denier.

== Weaving ==
Innegra S yarn is woven by a number of third party weavers. Innegra S can be woven alone, with carbon, fiberglass or other fibers to produce a hybrid fabric for the composites industry.

== Applications ==
- Composites:
  - sports & recreation – hockey sticks, tennis rackets, etc
  - kayaks, stand up paddle boards, surf boards
  - fiber reinforced concrete
- Automotive:
  - Formula One
- Marine
  - sail cloth
  - boat hull material
  - kayak
- Protective Gear Ballistics:
  - protective clothing and helmets
  - fabrics
  - body armor
  - helmet

== See also ==
- Aramid
- Fibers
- Nylon
- Personal protective equipment
- Textile
- Ballistics
