= Vectran =

Aromatic polyester fiber

- Except where otherwise noted, data are given for materials in their standard state (at 25 °C [77 °F], 100 kPa). Infobox references

Vectran is a manufactured fiber, spun from a liquid-crystal polymer (LCP) created by Celanese Corporation and now manufactured by Kuraray. Chemically it is an aromatic polyester produced by the polycondensation of 4-hydroxybenzoic acid and 6-hydroxynaphthalene-2-carboxylic acid.

== Properties ==
=== Advantages ===
Vectran's golden fibers are noted for their thermal stability at high temperatures, high strength and modulus, low creep, and good chemical stability. They are moisture-resistant and generally stable in hostile environments. Polyester coating is often used around a Vectran core; polyurethane coating can improve abrasion resistance and act as a water barrier. Vectran has a melting point of 330 °C, with progressive strength loss from 220 °C.

=== Disadvantages ===
Although the tensile strength is similar to that of Kevlar, Vectran tends to experience tensile fractures when exposed to significant stress. The wispy, hair-like fibers tend to fray, to easily acquire dirt, and to readily entangle in hook-and-loop fasteners, from which they must sometimes then be cut or (when possible) torn. If used without protective coatings, Vectran has low resistance to UV degradation and should not be used long-term in outdoor environments.

== Usage ==
Vectran fibers are used as reinforcing (matrix) fibers for ropes, electrical cables, sailcloth, and advanced composite materials, professional bike tires, and in electronics applications. It is used as one of the layers in the softgoods structure of NASA's Extravehicular Mobility Unit (spacesuit) designed and manufactured by ILC Dover and was the fabric used for all of the airbag landings on Mars: Mars Pathfinder in 1997 and on the twin Mars Exploration Rovers Spirit and Opportunity missions in 2004, also designed and manufactured by ILC Dover . The material was used again on NASA's 2011 Mars Science Laboratory in the bridle cables.

Vectran is a key component of a line of inflatable spacecraft developed by Bigelow Aerospace, not only on two stations which are in orbit but also the Bigelow Expandable Activity Module which NASA is testing for its radiation shielding and thermal control capabilities.

The United States Department of Homeland Security is sponsoring development of an inflatable plug made of Vectran to prevent flooding in New York City Subway tunnels and for other tunnels in New York City, as it is strong but relatively inexpensive, and not edible for rats. Vectran fiber is also used in manufacturing badminton strings such as Yonex BG-85 and BG-80. Vectran is also used in the manufacturing of Carlton Vapour Trail badminton rackets.

Vectran is used as a puncture protection layer in Continental Bicycle tyres such as the Grand Prix 5000, Competition tubular (single layer) and Grand Prix 4 season (two layers). Vectran does not increase rolling resistance or downgrade casing performance.

== Production ==
Kuraray Co., Ltd., in Japan, began manufacturing Vectran in 1990. As of June 2007, Kuraray has owned 100% of the worldwide Vectran production since 2005 when they acquired the Vectran business from Celanese Advanced Materials Inc. (CAMI), based in South Carolina, U.S.

The total capacity of Vectran expanded from about 600 tons/yr in 2007 to 1000 tons/yr in 2008.

== See also ==
- Aramid
- Twaron
- Carbon fiber
- Vectra
