= Aramid =

Class of synthetic fiber related to nylon

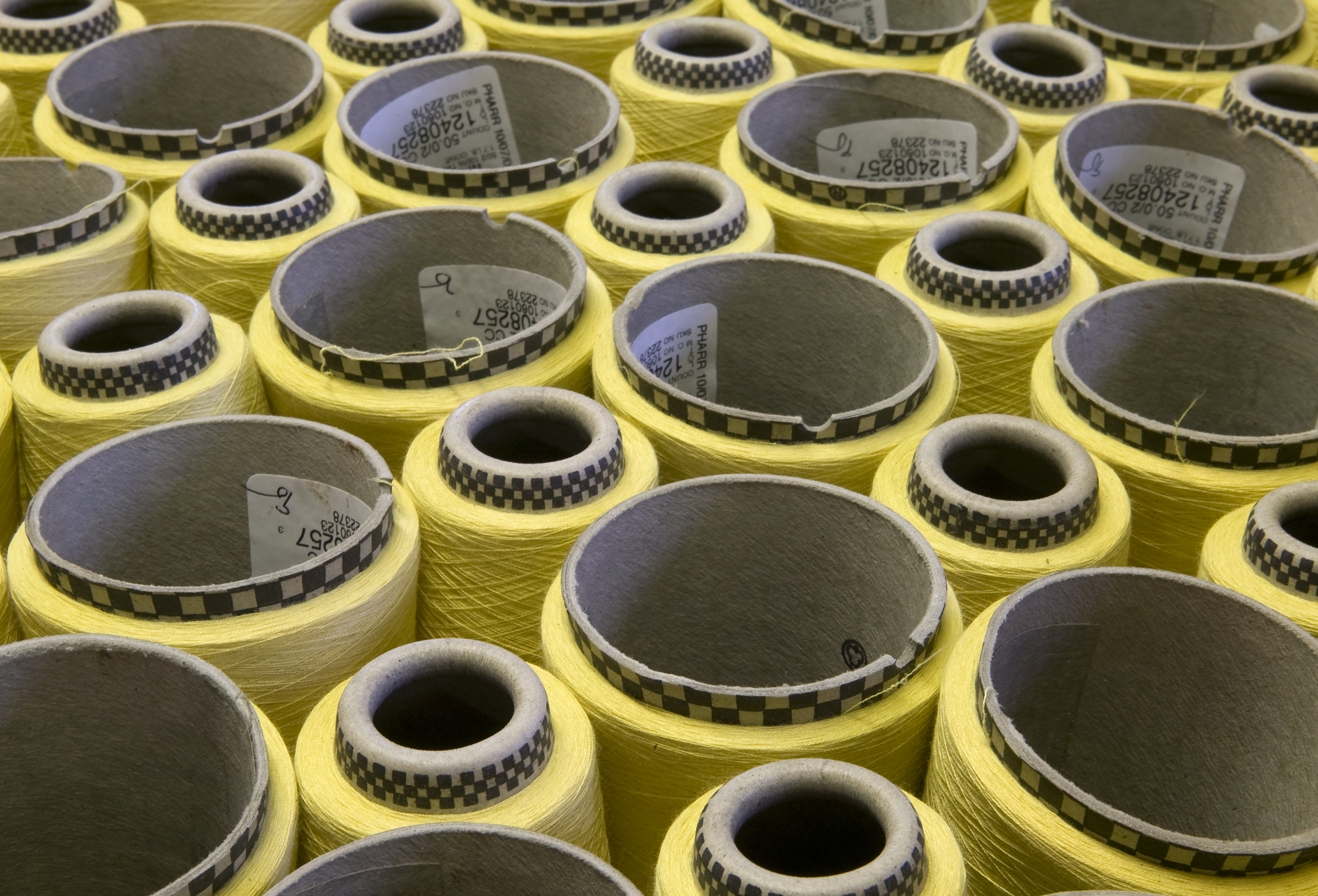
Spools of aramid yarn destined for body armor

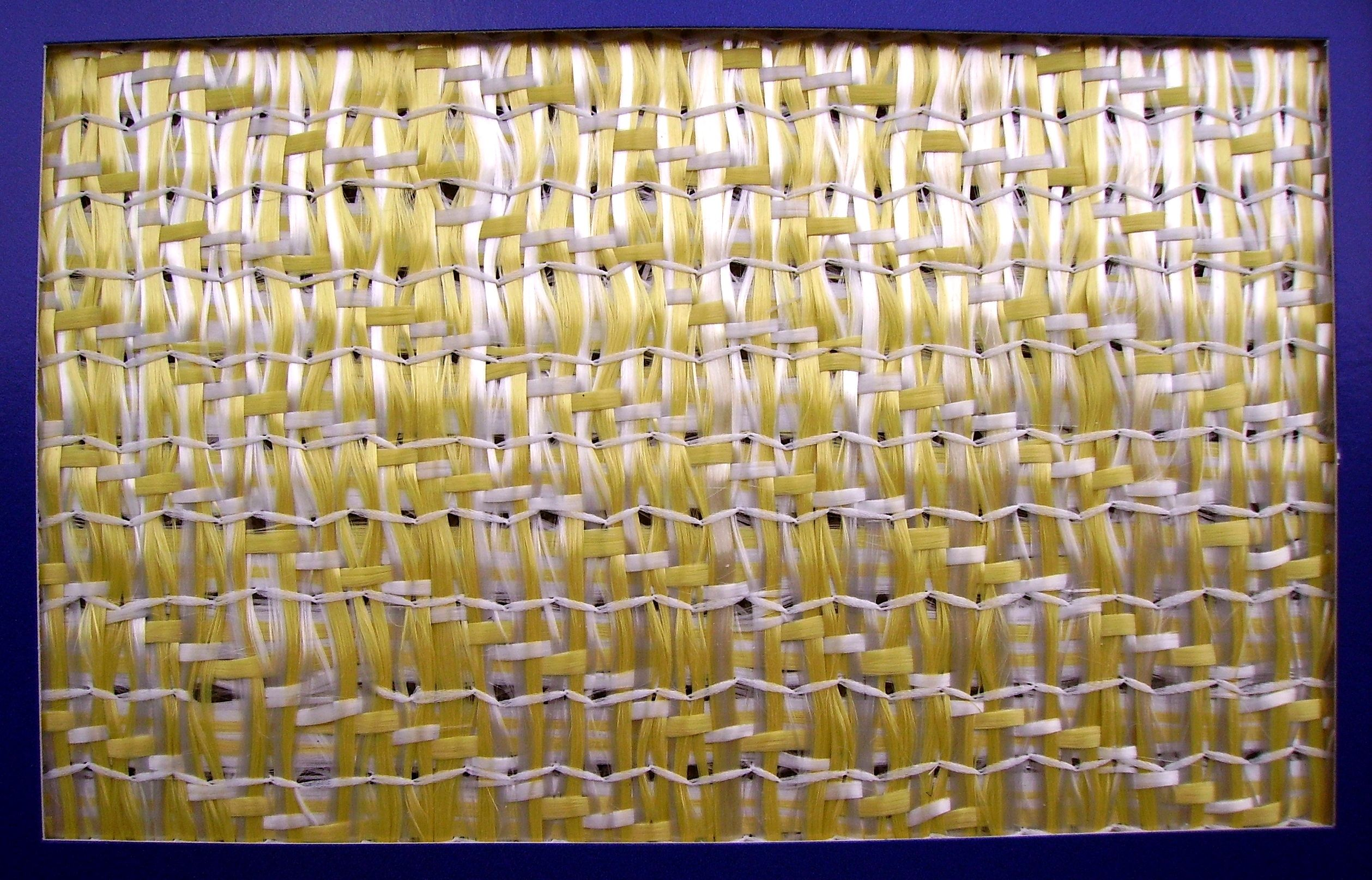
Fiberglass–aramid hybrid cloth

Aramid, or aromatic polyamide fibers are a class of strong, heat-resistant, synthetic fibers, commonly used in aerospace and military applications - e.g., ballistic-rated body armor fabric and ballistic composites, marine cordage and hull reinforcement - as a substitute for asbestos, and in lightweight consumer items, such as phone cases and tennis rackets.

Individual amide molecules forming the aramid chain polymerise in the direction of the fiber axis, lending greater structural integrity to the resulting fiber. This is due to the higher proportion of chemical bonds which contribute to the physical strength and thermal resistance (melting point >500 °C (932 °F)) versus other synthetic fibres, such as nylon.

Notable brands of aramid fiber include Kevlar, Nomex, and Twaron.

== Terminology and chemical structure ==
Structure of Twaron and Kevlar. The aromatic rings appear as hexagons. The rings are attached alternately to either two NH groups or two CO groups. The attachment points on each ring are diametrically opposite each other, a characteristic of the structure called para-aramid.

The term aramid is shortened from aromatic polyamide. It was introduced in 1972, accepted in 1974 by the Federal Trade Commission of the USA as the name of a generic category of fiber distinct from nylon, and adopted by the International Organization for Standardization in 1977.

Aromatic in the longer name refers to the presence of aromatic rings of six carbon atoms. In aramids these rings are connected via amide linkages each comprising a CO group attached to an NH group.

In order to meet the FTC definition of an aramid, at least 85% of these linkages must be attached to two aromatic rings. Below 85%, the material is instead classed as nylon.

=== Para-aramids and meta-aramids ===
Aramids are divided into two main types according to where the linkages attach to the rings. Numbering the carbon atoms sequentially around a ring, para-aramids have the linkages attached at positions 1 and 4, while meta-aramids have them at positions 1 and 3. That is, the attachment points are diametrically opposite each other in para-aramids, and two atoms apart in meta-aramids. The illustration thus shows a para-aramid.

== History ==
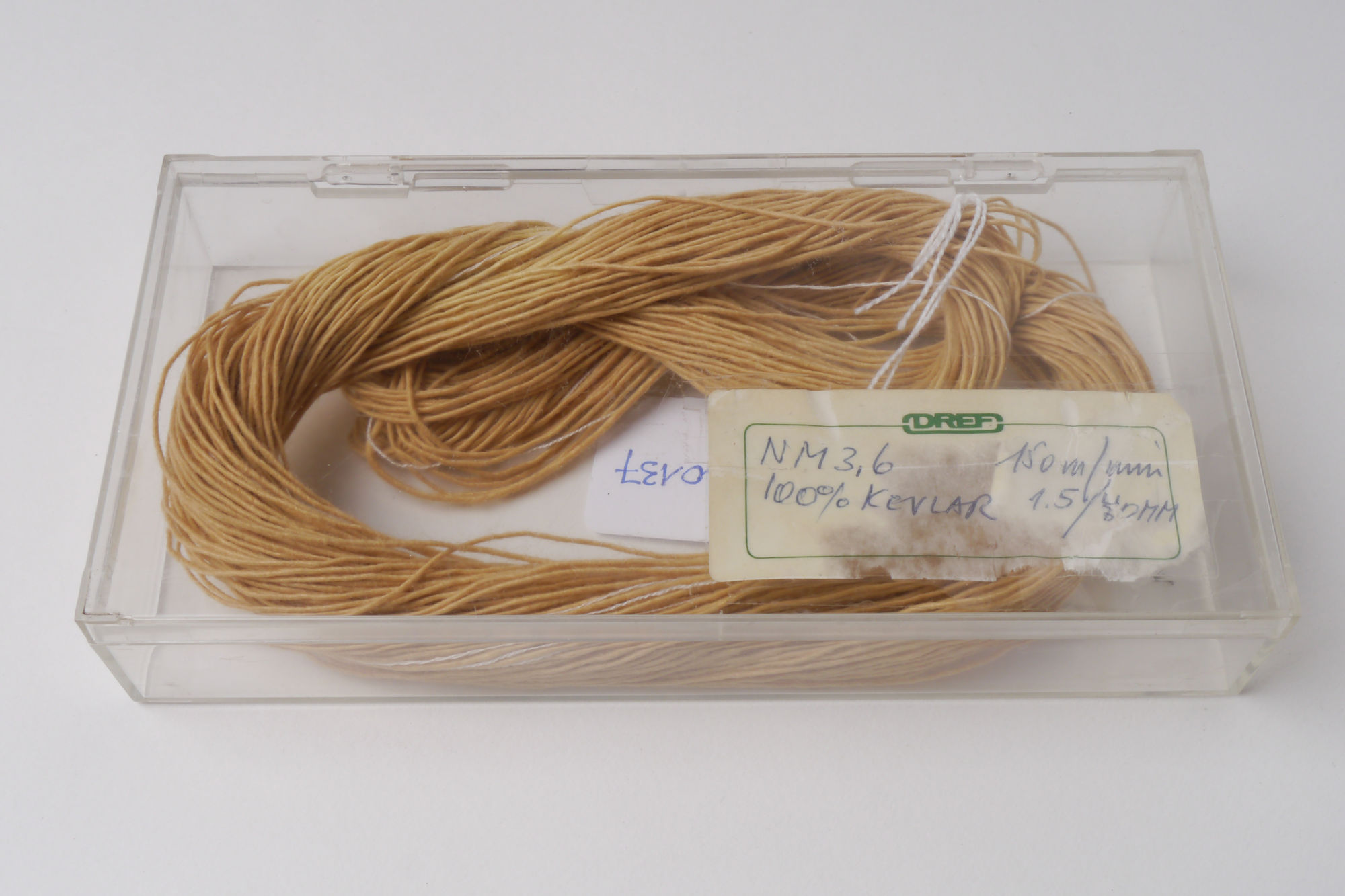
Kevlar brand aramid rope

Aromatic polyamides were first introduced in commercial applications in the early 1960s, with a meta-aramid fiber produced by DuPont as HT-1 and then under the trade name Nomex. This fiber, which handles similarly to normal textile apparel fibers, is characterized by its excellent resistance to heat, as it neither melts nor ignites in normal levels of oxygen. It is used extensively in the production of protective apparel, air filtration, thermal and electrical insulation, and as a substitute for asbestos.

Meta-aramids are also produced in the Netherlands and Japan by Teijin Aramid under the trade name Teijinconex, and by Toray under the trade name Arawin, in China by Yantai Tayho under the trade name New Star and by SRO Group under the trade name X-Fiper, and a variant of meta-aramid in France by Kermel under the trade name Kermel.

Based on earlier research by Monsanto Company and Bayer, para-aramid fiber with much higher tenacity and elastic modulus was also developed in the 1960s and 1970s by DuPont and AkzoNobel, both profiting from their knowledge of rayon, polyester and nylon processing. In 1973, DuPont was the first company to introduce a para-aramid fiber, calling it Kevlar; this remains one of the best-known para-aramids or aramids.

In 1978, Akzo introduced a similar fiber with roughly the same chemical structure calling it Twaron. Due to earlier patents on the production process, Akzo and DuPont engaged in a patent dispute in the 1980s. Twaron subsequently came under the ownership of the Teijin Aramid Company. In 2011, Yantai Tayho introduced similar fiber which is called Taparan in China (see Production).

Para-aramids are used in many high-tech applications, such as aerospace and military applications, for "bullet-proof" body armor fabric.

Both meta-aramid and para-aramid fiber can be used to make aramid paper. Aramid paper is used as electrical insulation materials and construction materials to make honeycomb core. Dupont made aramid paper during the 1960s, calling it Nomex paper. Yantai Metastar Special Paper introduced an aramid paper in 2007, which is called metastar paper. Both Dupont and Yantai Metastar make meta-aramid and para-aramid paper.

== Health ==
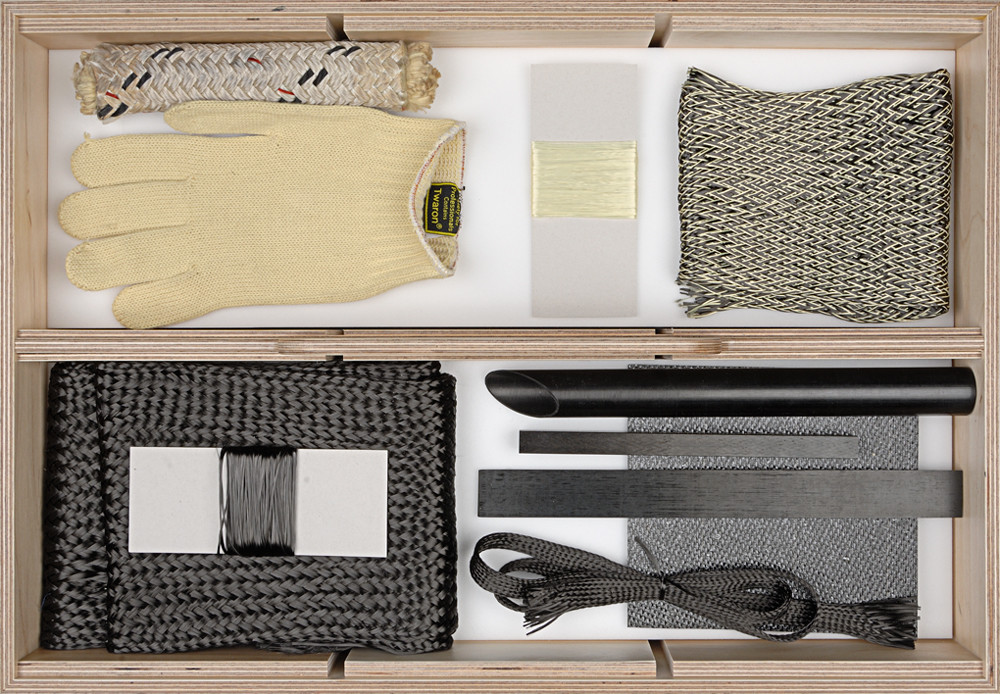
Display of aramid and carbon fiber products at the Textielmuseum in Tilburg. Clockwise from top right: combined aramid–carbon fiber braided textile, various carbon-fiber-reinforced composites, carbon yarn and woven textile, aramid Twaron glove, braided polyester rope with aramid core, aramid yarn.

During the 1990s, an in vitro test of aramid fibers showed they exhibited "many of the same effects on epithelial cells as did asbestos, including increased radiolabeled nucleotide incorporation into DNA and induction of ODC (ornithine decarboxylase) enzyme activity", raising the possibility of carcinogenic implications. However, in 2009, it was shown that inhaled aramid fibrils are shortened and quickly cleared from the body and pose little risk. A declaration of interest correction was later provided by the author of the study stating that "This review was commissioned and funded by DuPont and Teijin Aramid, but the author alone was responsible for the content and writing of the paper."

== Production ==
Aramid process diagram

World capacity of para-aramid production was estimated at 41,000 t (40,000 long tons; 45,000 short tons) per year in 2002 and increases each year by 5–10%. In 2007 this means a total production capacity of around 55,000 tonnes per year.

=== Polymer preparation ===
Aramids are generally prepared by the reaction between an amine group and a carboxylic acid halide group. Simple AB homopolymers have the connectivity −(NH−C_{6}H_{4}−CO)_{n}−.

Well-known aramid polymers such as Kevlar, Twaron, Nomex, New Star, and Teijinconex are prepared from diamine and diacid (or equivalent) precursors. These polymers can be further classified according to the linkages on the aromatic subunits. Nomex, Teijinconex, and New Star contain predominantly the meta-linkage. They are called poly-metaphenylene isophthalamides (MPIAs). By contrast, Kevlar and Twaron both feature para-linkages. They are called p-phenylene terephthalamides (PPTAs). PPTA is a product of p-phenylene diamine (PPD) and terephthaloyl dichloride (TDC or TCl).

Production of PPTA relies on a cosolvent with an ionic component (calcium chloride, CaCl_{2}) to occupy the hydrogen bonds of the amide groups, and an organic component (N-methyl pyrrolidone, NMP) to dissolve the aromatic polymer. This process was invented by Leo Vollbracht at Akzo. Apart from the carcinogenic HMPT, still no practical alternative of dissolving the polymer is known. The use of the NMP/CaCl_{2} system led to an extended patent dispute between Akzo and DuPont.

=== Spinning ===
After production of the polymer, the aramid fiber is produced by spinning the dissolved polymer to a solid fiber from a liquid chemical blend. Polymer solvent for spinning PPTA is generally 100% anhydrous sulfuric acid (H_{2}SO_{4}).

=== Appearances ===
- Fiber
- Chopped fiber
- Powder
- Pulp

== Other types of aramids ==
Besides meta-aramids like Nomex, other variations belong to the aramid fiber range. These are mainly of the copolyamide type, best known under the brand name Technora, as developed by Teijin and introduced in 1976. The manufacturing process of Technora reacts PPD and 3,4'-diaminodiphenylether (3,4'-ODA) with terephthaloyl chloride (TCl). This relatively simple process uses only one amide solvent, and therefore spinning can be done directly after the polymer production.

== Aramid fiber characteristics ==
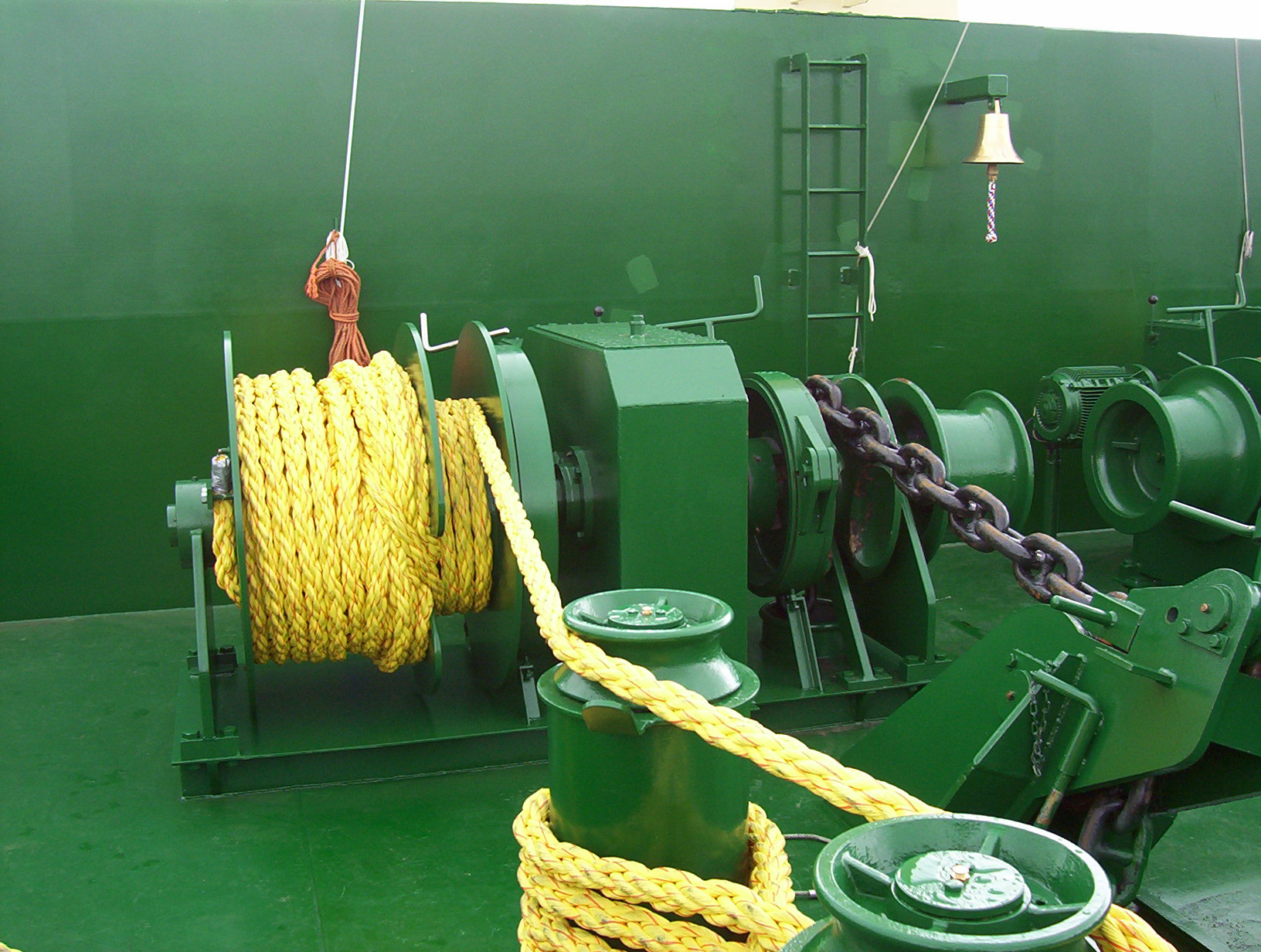
Aramid anchor rope used on board the MV Bornholm in the port of Delfzijl, June 2006

Aramids share a high degree of orientation with other fibers such as ultra-high-molecular-weight polyethylene, a characteristic that dominates their properties.

=== General ===
- good resistance to abrasion
- good resistance to organic solvents
- nonconductive
- very high melting point (>500 °C (932 °F))
- low flammability
- good fabric integrity at elevated temperatures
- sensitive to acids and salts
- sensitive to ultraviolet radiation
- prone to electrostatic charge build-up unless finished

=== Para-aramids ===
- para-aramid fibers, such as Kevlar and Twaron, provide outstanding strength-to-weight properties
- high chord modulus
- high tenacity
- low creep
- low elongation at break (~3.5%)
- difficult to dye – usually solution-dyed

== Uses ==
- flame-resistant clothing
- heat-protective clothing and helmets
- body armor, competing with polyethylene-based fiber products such as Dyneema and Spectra
- composite materials
- asbestos replacement (e.g. brake linings)
- hot air filtration fabrics
- tires, newly as Sulfron (sulfur-modified Twaron)
- mechanical rubber goods reinforcement
- ropes and cables
- V-belts (automotive, machinery, equipment, and more)
- wicks for fire dancing
- optical fiber cable systems
- sail cloth (not necessarily racing boat sails)
- sporting goods
- drumheads
- wind instrument reeds, such as the Fibracell brand
- loudspeaker diaphragms
- boathull material
- fiber-reinforced concrete
- reinforced thermoplastic pipes
- tennis strings, e.g. by Ashaway and Prince tennis companies
- hockey sticks (normally in composition with such materials as wood and carbon)
- snowboards
- jet engine enclosures
- fishing reel drag systems
- asphalt reinforcement
- prusiks for rock climbers (which slide along the main rope and can otherwise melt due to friction).
- snowboard core reinforcement
- mobile phone cases
- model rocket shock cords and parachute protectors

== See also ==
Para-aramid

- Kevlar
- Technora
- Twaron
- Heracron

Meta-aramid

- Nomex
- Teijinconex

Others

- Innegra S
- Nylon
- Textile
- Ultra-high-molecular-weight polyethylene
- Vectran
