= Twaron =

Trademark of Teijin Aramid for high-strength para-aramid fiber

Twaron (a brand name of Teijin Aramid) is a para-aramid, high-performance yarn. It is a heat-resistant fibre, helps in ballistic protection and cut protection. Twaron was developed in the early 1970s by the Dutch company Akzo Nobel's division Enka BV, later Akzo Industrial Fibers. The research name of the para-aramid fibre was originally Fiber X, but it was soon called Arenka. Although the Dutch para-aramid fiber was developed only a short time after DuPont's Kevlar, the introduction of Twaron as a commercial product came much later than Kevlar due to financial problems at the Akzo company in the 1970s. As of 2000, Twaron had become a global material and had been integrated into the global markets. Twaron has been around for over 30 years.

== History ==
This is a chronology of the development of Twaron:

- In 1960s a research program starts for "Fiber X."
- In 1972 the ENKA Research laboratory develops a para-aramid called Arenka.
- In 1973 Akzo decides to use sulfuric acid (H_{2}SO_{4}) as a solvent for spinning.
- In 1974 New process route was found at Akzo Research laboratory, using N-methylpyrrolidone (NMP) with a co-solvent (auxiliary solvent) with an ionic component (Calcium Chloride (CaCl_{2}) to occupy the hydrogen bonds of the amide groups in order to dissolve the aromatic polymer.
- In 1976 a pilot plant is built.
- In 1977 first production starts.
- In 1984 the product is renamed Twaron.
- In 1986 commercial production is started at five locations and nine plants.
- In 1987 Twaron is introduced as a commercial product.
- In 1989 the aramid business of Akzo becomes an independent Business Unit called Twaron BV.
- Since 2000 Twaron BV has been owned by the Teijin Group, now called Teijin Twaron BV and based in Arnhem, Netherlands. The main production facilities for Twaron are in Emmen and Delfzijl.
- In 2007 Teijin Twaron expands for the fourth time in six years and also changes its name into Teijin Aramid.

== Production ==
=== Polymer preparation ===
Twaron is a p-phenylene terephthalamide (PpPTA), the simplest form of the AABB para polyaramide. PpPTA is a product of p-phenylene diamine (PPD) and terephthaloyl dichloride (TDC).

At the time only 30.000 kg p-phenylene diamine (PPD) per year was available world wide. The AKZO Research Laboratory in Hengelo, researcher Dr J. de Graaf, created a process to have the yearly needed 30.000.000 kg PPD per year. At first the process created a bit of carcinogens, but this was resolved by adding methyl methacrylaat (MMC) when diazotisating Aminobenzeen.

To dissolve the aromatic polymer Twaron used a co-solvent of N-methyl pyrrolidone (NMP) and an ionic component (calcium chloride CaCl_{2}) to occupy the hydrogen bonds of the amide groups. The invention of this specific process was done in 1974 at AKZO Research Laboratory in Arnhem by a team consisting of Leo Vollbracht, Teun Veerman (assistant of Leo Vollbracht) and Wim Engelhard (trainee, who actually discovered NMP as the appropriate solvent to keep the growing polymer as long as possible in solution; he also discovered that high speed mixing of PPD and TDC was necessary to obtain a sufficiently long polymer chains). The patent of the newly discovered process route led to a patent war between AKZO (Fibre X) and DuPont (Fibre B) as Dupont initially used the carcinogenic HMPT (hexamethylphosphoramide). Despite heavy research DuPont now also applies the AKZO patent for their Kevlar process and use the less hazardous NMP.

=== Spinning ===
After the production of the Twaron polymer in Delfzijl, the polymer is brought to Emmen, where fibres are produced by spinning the dissolved polymer into a solid fibre from a liquid chemical blend. Polymer solvent for spinning PPTA is generally 100% anhydrous (water free) sulfuric acid (H_{2}SO_{4}). The polymer is dissolved by mixing frozen sulfuric acid in powder form with the polymer in powder form and gently heating the mixture. This process, which differs from the more difficult DuPont process, was invented by Henri Lammers and patented by AKZO.

== Use ==
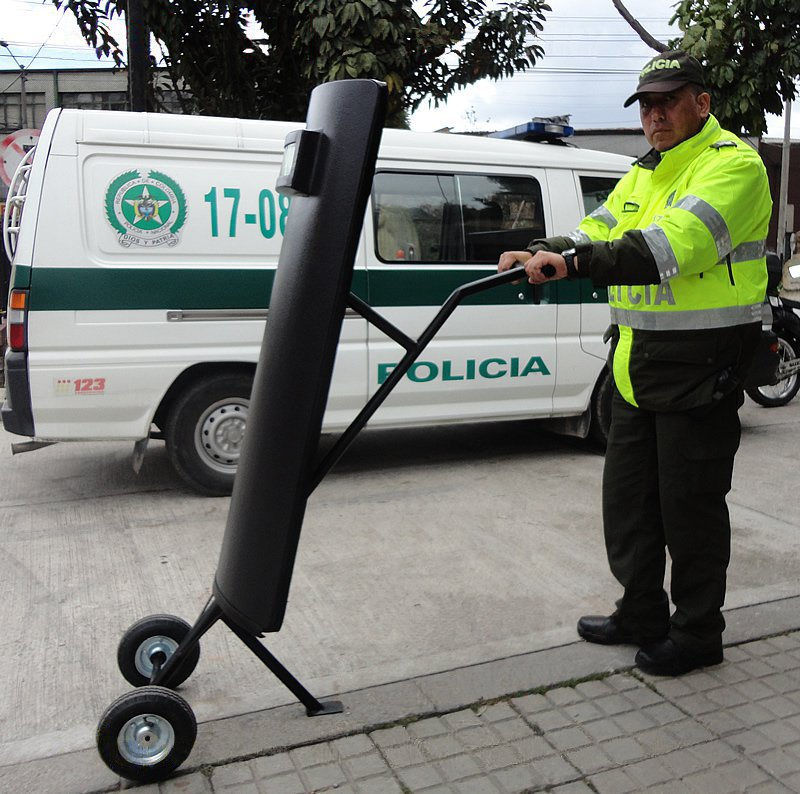
Rifle protection police shield used by the National Police of Colombia. Stops 7.62 mm and 5.56 mm caliber rounds. Made from light ceramics and Twaron.

Twaron is a para-aramid and has automotive, construction, sports, aerospace, and military applications, e.g., in modern body armor, fabric, and as an asbestos substitute.

Protective gear (heat resistant / ballistics)
flame-resistant clothing, protective clothing and helmets, cut-fast or heat-hardy gloves, sporting goods, textiles, ballistic vests
Composites
composite materials, technical paper, asbestos replacement, hot air filtration, sailcloth, speaker woofers, boat hull material, fiber reinforced concrete, drumheads
Automotive
brake pads, turbo hoses, V-belts and Timing belts, tires that incorporate Sulfron (sulfur modified Twaron), mechanical rubber goods reinforcement
Linear tension
optical fiber cables (OFC), ropes, wire ropes, electrical cables, umbilical cables, electrical mechanical cable (EMC), reinforced thermoplastic pipes
Yacht construction
on monohulls and catamarans (such as the Catana 581), the glass fibre hull may have an inner skin of Twaron aramid fabric laminated over the core to increase stiffness and impact resistance.

== See also ==
- Fibers
- Kégresse track
- Nylon
- Technora
- Vectran
