= Poly(2,6-diphenylphenylene oxide) =

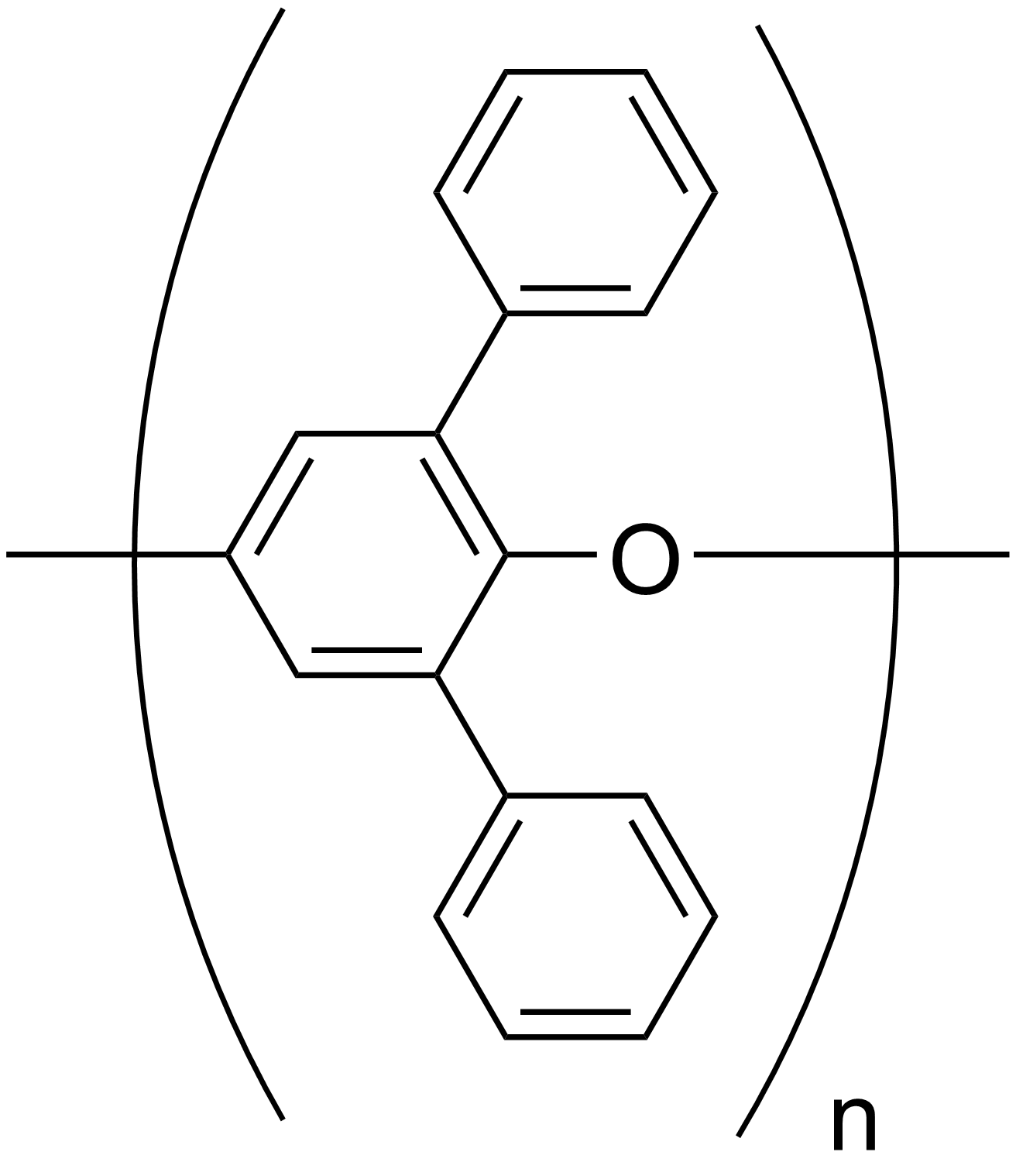
- Poly(2,6-diphenylphenylene oxide)

Names
- IUPAC name poly(2,6-diphenylphenylene oxide), poly(oxy -2,6-diphenyl-1,4-phenylene)
- Other names poly(oxy[1,1′:3′,1′′-terphenyl]-2′,5′-diyl), poly(2,6-diphenylphenol), poly(2,6-diphenyl-p-phenylene oxide)

Identifiers
| CAS Number | 24938-68-9 |
| ChemSpider | none |
| ECHA InfoCard | 100.209.694 |
| CompTox Dashboard (EPA) | DTXSID30947818 |

Properties
| Chemical formula | (C_{18}H_{12}O)_{x} |
| Density | 0.25 g/cm^{3}, 0.55 g/ cm^{3} (23% graphitised) |
| Specific Surface Area | 35 m^{2} /g |
| Pore volume | 2.4 cm^{3}/g |
| Average Pore Size | 200 nm |
- Except where otherwise noted, data are given for materials in their standard state (at 25 °C [77 °F], 100 kPa). verify (what is ?) Infobox references

Poly(2,6-diphenyl-p-phenylene oxide) (PPPO) is a porous polymer resin based on oxidative polymerisation of 2,6-diphenylphenol. It is mostly known by its trademark Tenax.

== Properties ==
Poly(2,6-diphenylphenylene oxide) is a low bleeding material with a low level of impurities, and has a high thermal stability (up to 350 °C). Before use poly(2,6-diphenylphenylene oxide) should be thermally conditioned with a high purity gas at elevated temperatures to remove any residual components. During conditioning or thermal desorption the presence of oxygen should be avoided. Poly(2,6-diphenylphenylene oxide) reacts with oxidising agents such as chlorine, ozone, nitrogen oxides and sulfur oxides forming acetophenone, benzaldehyde and phenol. Therefore, control of blanks is essential and storage time of samples on poly(2,6-diphenylphenylene oxide) is less than a month. Pre-filters based on sodium thiosulphate or Teflon may be appropriate to use. The breakthrough volumes are low for very volatile substances. This problem is partly solved by graphitised poly(2,6-diphenylphenylene oxide). Although the polymer has a low affinity for water, high humidity in air may lower the breakthrough volumes of substances.

== Use ==
Poly(2,6-diphenylphenylene oxide) is used for trapping of volatiles and semi-volatiles from air such as environmental air and human breath, and for personal exposure monitoring. It is also used for determining the emission of chemical substances from plants, soil and commercial products. Volatile substances in liquid or solid matrices can be made available by the purge and trap technique. The polymer is of particularly used for concentration of high boiling compounds such as alcohols, polyethylene glycols, diols, phenols, monoamines and diamines, ethanolamines, amides, aldehydes, ketones and chlorinated aromatics.

Poly(2,6-diphenylphenylene oxide) is used as food simulant for testing the release of chemical substances from food contact materials into food.

== Trademarks ==
Tenax is a registered trademark of Buchem B.V.

- Tenax GC (replaced by Tenax TA)
- Tenax TA (mesh 20-35, 35-60, 60-80, 80-100, 100-200)
- Tenax GR: 23% graphite (mesh 20-35, 35-60, 60-80, 80-100)
