= Teijin Aramid =

Dutch manufacturer of aramid fibers

Teijin Aramid BV
- Formerly: Teijin Twaron BV (2000–2007); Twaron BV (1989–2000)
- Company type: Industrial fiber producer
- Industry: Chemicals - Fibers
- Founded: 1983 by Akzo Nobel
- Headquarters: The Netherlands, Arnhem
- Number of locations: 17
- Key people: Taiichi Machida - CEO
- Number of employees: 1,750 (2017)
- Parent: Teijin Ltd
- Website: www.teijinaramid.com

Teijin Aramid, formerly known as Teijin Twaron, is a company in The Netherlands that produces various high-strength fibers for industrial purposes, most notably their para-aramid, Twaron. Twaron finds applications in numerous markets, such as automotive (tires, hoses, belts), aerospace, civil engineering, construction, leisure goods (e.g. boats), protective clothing (bullet-, fire- and cut-resistant clothing), optical fiber cables, friction and sealing materials and more. The company has been part of the Japanese Teijin Group since 2000, prior to this they were a division of Akzo Nobel, division Industrial Fibers. Next to Twaron, the company markets Technora, Teijinconex as well.

== History ==
Twaron is a heat-resistant and strong synthetic fiber, developed in early 1970s by the Dutch company AKZO, division Enka, later Akzo Nobel Industrial Fibers. The research name of the aramid was originally Fiber X, but soon called Arenka.

In 1973, Akzo decided to use sulphuric acid (H_{2}SO_{4}) as a solvent for spinning.

In 1976, a pilot plant was built.

In 1982, the name Twaron was introduced.

In 1985, commercial production was started on 3 locations and 9 plants.

In 1989, the aramid business of AKZO became an independent Business Unit called Twaron BV.

In 1995, the capacity was 11.000 tons/yr

Since 2000, Twaron BV is owned by the Teijin Group and now called Teijin Twaron BV. Teijin Twaron is based in Arnhem, The Netherlands and main production facilities for Twaron are in Emmen and Delfzijl.

In 2003, a major capacity increase to 18.500 tons/yr was completed.

In 2006, additional process improvements gave 24.000 tons/yr capacity.

In 2007, the name of Teijin Twaron BV was changed to Teijin Aramid BV.

Teijin projects an 8- to 10-percent increase in the worldwide aramid fibers market in future years, and is adding another 5- to 10-percent increase in capacity in 2007.

On July 13, 2017, Teijin Aramid announced it is going to expand its aramid production capacity for its Twaron super fiber. It will invest in new spinning technology at the Twaron facility in Emmen, the Netherlands, starting up in the first quarter of 2019.

On December 20, 2017, Teijin Aramid announced its second intention to increase the production capacity for its Twaron super fiber by more than 25%. This additional capacity will become available within the next five years. With this capacity expansion, Teijin Aramid will be able to meet future market demand and provide its customers with the material they need to excel in their markets. The total extra capacity is planned to be fully available in the year 2022.
