= List of equipment of the Republic of Korea Army =

This is a comprehensive list of all currently used South Korean Army military equipment.

== Individual gear ==
Uniform
Model	Image	Type	Notes
Granite B		Digital camouflage-pattern	Standard issue. Referred to as "Digital (디지털)" in Korean.
ROKPAT		Digital camouflage-pattern	Used by Republic of Korea Army Special Warfare Command
Woodland		Woodland	Old standard issue. Used during training exercises. Referred to as "Tonghab (통합)" in Korean, meaning "Unified". It is colloquially referred to as "Frog (개구리)". While similar to US Woodland, it uses a different color palette.
Arid Woodland		Woodland	Old standard camouflage pattern for Zaytun Division, it is Tonghap in arid version.
Dessert Battle Dress Uniform "Chocolate Chip"		Woodland	The first arid camouflage used by the Army during the Iraq War and in the War in Afghanistan. Replaced with newest arid camouflage.
Helmet
Model	Image	Type	Note
MP Helmet			Used by the Army Military Police, Honor Guards only. No official designation, the helmets look alike to M1 helmets, but constructed from plastic and one-piece.
M80		Combat Helmet	Primarily training and reserve. Similar to a M1 helmet, but constructed from layered fiberglass and one-piece.
KHB-2000		Combat Helmet	Standard issue. Exists in 2 point and 4 point harness variants.
KHB Type III KCI-105		Combat Helmet	Current standard issue, alongside KHB-2000.
FAST		Combat Helmet	Used by Special Forces
KH-80A1 CVCH		Crewman Helmet	Standard issue Crewman Helmet for Main battle tank and Armored Fighting Vehicle Crewman.
Body Armor
Model	Image	Type	Note
Multipurpose Bulletproof Vest		Bulletproof vest	Large amount.
Type 2 Combat Bulletproof Vest		Bulletproof vest	Unknown
Type 3 Combat Vest		Bulletproof vest	Issued by some unit and Special Force.
KFLC		Load-bearing vest	Large amount
PASGT-style		Bulletproof vest	Phased out.

== Small arms ==
Model	Manufacturer	Image	Origin	Type	Caliber	Notes
Handguns
K5	Daewoo Precision Industries		South Korea	Pistol	9×19mm NATO	Standard-issue sidearm
Jericho 941FL	Israel Weapon Industries		Israel	Pistol	9×19mm NATO	Used by the Army Military Police Special Duty Team Being replaced by K5
Beretta 92	Fabbrica d'Armi Pietro Beretta		Italy	Pistol	9×19mm NATO	Beretta 92SB and 92F Used by UNPKO troops in Lebanon, and special operations
Glock	Glock Ges.m.b.H.		Austria	Pistol	9×19mm NATO	Used by Republic of Korea Army Special Warfare Command
S&W Model 10	Smith & Wesson		United States	Revolver	.38 Special	2-inch snub-nosed versions are given to high-ranking officers Also used by the Army Military Police Special Duty Team
M1911A1	Colt Manufacturing Company		United States	Pistol	.45 ACP	Mostly replaced by K5, limited usage
Submachine guns
K7	Daewoo Precision Industries		South Korea	Silenced submachine gun	9×19mm NATO	Used by Republic of Korea Army Special Warfare Command
H&K MP5	Heckler & Koch		Germany	Submachine gun	9×19mm NATO	MP5A5, MP5SD6, MP5K models Used by the 707th Special Mission Group
IWI X95 9mm SMG	Israel Weapon Industries		Israel	Submachine gun	9×19mm NATO	Adopted as an anti-terror submachine gun in 2023 Used by the ROK Special Warfare Command
PPSh-41	—		Soviet Union	Submachine gun	7.62×25mm Tokarev	Used for "aggressor" training and secret agent training
Assault rifles, carbines & battle rifles
K1A	Daewoo Precision Industries		South Korea	Carbine	5.56×45mm NATO	Standard-issue carbine; will be partially replaced by the K13/K17. Most K1A will be retrofitted to the K1AC1 variant featuring a fixed stock.
K2	Daewoo Precision Industries		South Korea	Assault rifle	5.56×45mm NATO	Standard-issue assault rifle; being partially replaced by the K2C1
K2C1	SNT Motiv		South Korea	Assault rifle	5.56×45mm NATO	Standard-issue assault rifle
K13	SNT Motiv		South Korea	Assault rifle	5.56×45mm NATO	Designation for STC16 carbine; to partially replace the K1A
K17	SNT Motiv		South Korea	Assault rifle	5.56×45mm NATO	New designation for K13 carbine, officially; to replace the K1A
FN SCAR-L	FN Herstal		Belgium	Assault rifle	5.56×45mm NATO	Used by the 707th Special Mission Group
KAC SR-16	Knight's Armament Company		United States	Assault rifle	5.56×45mm NATO	Adopted in 2022. Used by the 707th Special Mission Group.
M16A1	Daewoo Precision Industries		United States	Assault rifle	5.56×45mm NATO	1,039,599 produced under license Used by reserve forces, and used in the 39th infantry division.
AK-74	—		Soviet Union Russia	Assault rifle	5.45×39mm	Used for "aggressor" training and secret agent training
AK-47	—		Soviet Union	Assault rifle	7.62×39mm	Used for "aggressor" training and secret agent training
Type 58	Factory 61/65		North Korea	Assault rifle	7.62×39mm	Used for "aggressor" training and secret agent training
Precision rifles
K14	SNT Motiv		South Korea	Sniper rifle	7.62×51mm NATO	Standard-issue sniper rifle
SSG 69	Steyr Arms		Austria	Sniper rifle	7.62×51mm NATO	Used by special forces Being replaced by K14
AWSM	Accuracy International		United Kingdom	Sniper rifle	.338 Lapua Magnum	Used by the 707th Special Mission Group
Barrett MRAD	Barrett Firearms Manufacturing		United States	Sniper rifle	.338 Lapua Magnum	Used by the 707th Special Mission Group
Barrett M82	Barrett Firearms Manufacturing		United States	Anti-materiel rifle	.50 BMG	Used by the 707th Special Mission Group
Machine guns
K15	SNT Motiv		South Korea	Light machine gun	5.56×45mm NATO	Standard-issue squad automatic weapon. Replacing the Daewoo Precision Industries K3
K16	SNT Motiv		South Korea	General-purpose machine gun	7.62×51mm NATO	Current Standard-issue GPMG. Planned to replace the M60 machine gun
K3	Daewoo Precision Industries		South Korea	Light machine gun	5.56×45mm NATO	Formerly standard-issue squad automatic weapon
M60	Daewoo Precision Industries		United States; South Korea	General-purpose machine gun	7.62×51mm NATO	M60, M60D and M60E2 Produced under license; being replaced by the K16
K6 machine gun	SNT Dynamics		South Korea	Heavy machine gun	12.7×99mm NATO	Browning M2HB with additional modification. K6 and M2 parts are not interchangeable.
Battle Rifles
M1 Garand	—		United States	Battle rifle	.30-06 Springfield	For ceremonial use
M14 rifle	—		United States	Battle rifle	7.62×51mm NATO	For ceremonial use
Grenades and grenade launchers
K4	Daewoo Precision Industries		South Korea	Automatic grenade launcher	40×53mm HV	Standard-issue automatic grenade launcher
K201	Daewoo Precision Industries		South Korea	Grenade launcher	40×46mm LV	Standard-issue under-barrel grenade launcher; fitted on K2 rifles
M203	—		United States	Grenade launcher	40×46mm LV	Being replaced by the K201
K400	Hanwha	—	South Korea	Hand grenade	60mm	Former (1975~1994) standard issue hand grenade 450 g K401 practice grenade with similar shape and weight as the K400.
K413	Hanwha	—	South Korea	Hand grenade	55mm	Standard issue hand grenade (1994~); 260 g K479 practice grenade with similar shape and weight as the K413.
Unguided anti-tank weapons and anti-structure
M72 LAW	—		United States; Norway	Disposable, man-portable rocket launcher	72 mm	Now on reserve army not in FEBA area
KM67	Hyundai WIA		United States; South Korea	Man-portable recoilless rifle	90 mm	Produced under license by Hyundai WIA
KM40A2	Hyundai WIA		United States; South Korea	Recoilless rifle	106 mm	Produced under license by Hyundai WIA
Panzerfaust 3	Poongsan Corporation		Germany; South Korea	Reusable Man-portable rocket launcher	110 mm	Produced under license by Poongsan
Guided anti-tank weapons
9K115-1 Metis-M	Tula Machinery Design Bureau (Tula KBP) – Tulsky Oruzheiny Zavod		Russia	Man-portable SACLOS ATGM	94 mm	Given by Russia as a partial payment of debts incurred during the Soviet era; SACLOS sighting device and 12,000 missiles were domestically produced by LG Corporation. 226 fire units received
Hyungung AT-1K Raybolt	LIG Nex1		South Korea	Man-portable fire-and-forget missile	150 mm	
BGM-71 TOW	Hughes Aircraft Company		United States	Wire guided ATGM	152 mm	Fire unit reusable, tube disposable
TAipers	LIG Nex1 Hanwha		South Korea	Fire-and-forget missile	—	Successor of the BGM-71 TOW from 2024, to equip LAH attack helicopters
Accessory
CornerShot	Corner Shot Holdings		Israel	Pistol corner shooter adapter	—	Used by special forces

== Tanks ==
*The list includes equipment used by both the ROK Army and ROK Marine Corps.

The ROK Army operates 2,200 Tanks as of 2025.

Vehicle	Image	Origin	Type	In service	Manufacturer	Notes
K1/K1E2		South Korea	Main battle tank	1,027	Hyundai Rotem	Produced from 1985 to 1998. All K1 are being upgraded to the K1E1 standard (equivalent to K1A2), completion expected in 2026. A further upgrade to the standard K1E2 is expected to take place from 2024.
K1A2		South Korea	Main battle tank	484	Hyundai Rotem	Produced from 1999 to 2010. All K1A1s will be upgraded to the K1A2 model. Upgrades are expected to be completed by 2022.
K2 Black Panther		South Korea	Main battle tank	260 in service 150 more planned	Hyundai Rotem	Produced from 2013. Initial mass production has been under way since the end of 2013.: Batch 1: 100 K2 with MTU MT883 Ka-501 engine and Renk HSWL 295 TM transmission.; Batch 2: 106 K2 with HD Hyundai Infracore DV27K engine and Renk HSWL 295 TM transmission.; Batch 3: 54 K2 with HD Hyundai Infracore DV27K engine and SNT Dynamics EST15K transmission.; Sold to Poland: 10 K2 of Batch 3, Batch 4: 150 K2 on order with HD Hyundai Infracore DV27K engine and SNT Dynamics EST15K transmission, to be delivered after the supply of the Polish Army.
T-62 "Tiran-6"		USSR; Israel	Main battle tank	17	—	Used for "aggressor" training. Their presence was considered classified but released to the public after the army's invitation events.
T-72M1		USSR	Main battle tank	5 3	Uralvagonzavod	Used for "aggressor" training. Their presence was considered classified but released to the public after the army's invitation events.
T-80U T-80UK		USSR; Russia	Main battle tank	33 T-80U 2 T-80UK	Omsktransmash	Used for "aggressor" training. T-80U delivered between 1995 and 1997. 2 T-80UK delivered in 2005. These tanks were transferred as a partial payment of debts incurred during the Soviet era.

== Armored fighting vehicles ==
The ROK Army operates 2,700 armored vehicles as of 2014 (this figure does not include wheeled armored personnel carriers).

=== Tracked ===
Vehicle	Image	Origin	Type	In service	Manufacturer/Produced	Notes
K200/A1		South Korea	Armored personnel carrier	1,700	Doosan/(1985~)	Excludes non-armored personnel carrier variant K200 platforms.
K21		South Korea	Infantry fighting vehicle	More than 466~ (As of 2018)	Doosan/(2009–present)	Additional 120 K21s will be introduced by 2027.
BMP-3		USSR; Russia	Infantry fighting vehicle	33 BMP-3F 37 BMP-3M	Kurganmashzavod	Used for "aggressor" training. Given by Russia in 1996 and 2005 as a partial payment of debts incurred during the Soviet era. In 2016, Moscow was seeking the possibility of their return.
M113 M113K1		United States	Armored personnel carrier	All phased out.	FMC Corporation	Up to 400 in reserve/storage.
Variants of the K200 armored personnel carrier
K216 K221 K255 K277		South Korea	NBC reconnaissance vehicle Smoke generating vehicle Ammunition resupply vehicle Command post vehicle	≈800	Doosan/Late 1980s~	

=== Wheeled ===
Vehicle	Image	Origin	Type	In service	Manufacturer/Produced	Notes
K806 White Tiger		South Korea	6×6 wheeled armored personnel carrier	100	Hyundai Rotem/2016 ~	Evolution of the KW1 Scorpion.
K808 White Tiger		South Korea	8×8 wheeled armored personnel carrier	500	Hyundai Rotem/2016 ~	The ROK Army has selected Hyundai Rotem over the Samsung Techwin and Doosan DST consortium as the preferred bidder for 600 wheeled armored vehicles. To enter service between 2017 and 2023.
K808 White Tiger		South Korea	8×8 command post vehicles (CPVs)	27 (As of 2023)	Hyundai Rotem/2023 ~	600 ordered in 2023, to be delivered between 2023 until 2029.
KM900 / 901 (Fiat 6614)		South Korea; Italy	4×4 wheeled armored personnel carrier	All phased out	Asia Motors/1977~1985	Produced 482 KM900/901 wheeled APCs under license. Some in reserve/storage.
Barracuda (TM-170)		South Korea; West Germany	4×4 wheeled armored personnel carrier	10	Doosan DST	Being used by United Nations peacekeepers.
MaxxPro		United States	4×4 MRAP	10	International Truck	Used by the Korean special forces in Afghanistan.
K151 Raycolt		South Korea	4×4 armored car	> 2,000	Kia Motors	

== Engineering vehicles ==
Vehicle	Image	Origin	Type	In service	Manufacturer	Notes
K1 AVLB		South Korea	Armored vehicle launched bridge	70	Hyundai Mobis	Based on the MBT K1 chassis.
K1 ARV		South Korea	Armored recovery vehicle	150	Hyundai Mobis	Based on the MBT K1 chassis. More in production.
K600 CEV		South Korea	Combat engineering vehicle		Hyundai Rotem	Based on the MBT K1 chassis.
K288		South Korea	Armored recovery vehicle		Doosan DST	Based on the APC K200 chassis.
K21 ARV		South Korea	Armored recovery vehicle		Doosan DST	Based on the IFV K21 chassis.
KM9 ACE		United States; South Korea	Armored combat earthmover	207	Samsung Techwin	These were made under licence in South Korea by Samsung Techwin.
M3K Amphibious Rig		Germany; South Korea	Amphibious bridging vehicle		Hanwha Aerospace	110 ordered in 2021 delivered from 2024 to 2027 Produced under license by Hanwha Aerospace.
Keiler		Germany	Mine clearing vehicle	1	Rheinmetall Landsysteme	Based on a modified M48 chassis.
Rhino		Germany	Mine clearing vehicle	3	Rheinmetall Landsysteme	
Mine Breaker 2000		Germany	Mine clearing vehicle	1	Rheinmetall Landsysteme	
Aardvark Mk4		United Kingdom	Mine clearing vehicle	2	Aardvark Clear Mine Ltd.	

== Logistics and utility vehicles ==
Vehicle	Image	Origin	Type	Payload	Quantity	Manufacturer	Notes
Variants of the K131
K131 K132 K133 KM422 KM424 KM426	K131	South Korea	4x4 utility vehicle Bulletproof utility vehicle NBC reconnaissance Tow missile launcher carrier 106mm recoilless rifle carrier 40 mm grenade launcher	1/4 ton (off-road)	7,866	Kia Motors	
Variants of the K311
K311 K301 K312 K313 K314 K315 K316 K317 K318 K319 Box car		South Korea	4x4 utility vehicle Combat food supply Ambulance Shop van Signals vehicle Secret code NBC reconnaissance Biological reconnaissance Smoke generating vehicle Bulletproof FDC, UAV, communication	1 1/4 ton (off-road)	13,170	Kia Motors	
Variants of the K511
K511 K512 K513 K514 K515 K516 K517 K518 K519 K606 Box car		South Korea	6x6 cargo truck Shop van Fuel tanker Fire direction center vehicle Water tanker secret code long bed Bulletproof cargo combat food supply hydraulic crane UAV, communication, PX	2 1/2 ton (off-road)	18,972	Kia Motors	
Variants of the K711
K711 K712 K713 K714 K715 K716 K717 K718 K719 K720 K721 Box car		South Korea	6x6 cargo truck Wrecker Dump truck K136 Kooryoung Tractor Expandable van Spare parts van Floating bridge Ribbon bridge Long bed cargo decontamination Radar, water filter, etc.	5 ton (off-road)	10,563	Kia Motors	

Vehicle	Image	Origin	Type	Payload	Quantity	Manufacturer	Notes
K912		South Korea	8x8 wrecker			Kia Motors	KM1001 Wrecker for disposal of large & modernized equipment exceeding operating capacity of the KM502 (K711 variant) Wrecker
K915		South Korea	8x8 tractor	60 ~ 100 ton		Kia Motors	KM1002 Tractor for transportation of large-heavy equipment such as tanks and armored vehicles
K917		South Korea	8x8 cargo truck	15 ton		Kia Motors	
Hyundai Trago		South Korea	6x4 tractor	100 ton		Hyundai Motors	Military-equipped civilian vehicles
HEMTT A4		United States	MLRS resupply		58	Oshkosh Corp.	
Unimog		Germany	Snowplow vehicle		34	Mercedes-Benz	
K532 K533 K534		Sweden; South Korea	Mortar carrier Electronic warfare Signals vehicle		≈500	Kia Motors	The Hagglunds BV206 was built in Korea under license by Kia Motors.

The RoK Army operates 9,096 civil vehicles ranging from sedans to buses, forklifts, excavators, and graders.

== Communication equipment ==
Equipment	Image	Origin	Type	Manufacturer	Frequency	Notes
PRC-85K		South Korea	Walkie-talkie	LIG Nex1 (formerly LG Precision)	VHF/FM	Slowly being retired
PRC-96K		South Korea	Walkie-talkie	LIG Nex1 (formerly LG Precision)	VHF/FM	Standard-issue
PRC-77K		United States; South Korea	Portable transceiver	LIG Nex1 (formerly LG Precision)	VHF/FM	Produced under license. Mainly used by the Republic of Korea Reserve Forces
PRC-999K		South Korea	Portable transceiver	LIG Nex1 (formerly LG Precision)	VHF/FM	Standard-issue
ARC-900K		South Korea	Aircraft transceiver	LIG Nex1 (formerly LG Precision)	VHF/FM	
KTA-312		United States; South Korea	Field telephone		corded	Produced under license; slowly being retired
TA-512K		South Korea	Field telephone		corded	Standard-issue
AN/PRC-950K		South Korea	Portable transceiver	Huneed	HF/AM	
AN/VRC-950K		South Korea	Vehicle transceiver	Huneed	HF/AM	
VRC-946K		South Korea	Vehicle transceiver (jeep)	Huneed	VHF/FM	
VRC-947K		South Korea	Vehicle transceiver (truck)	Huneed	VHF/FM	
VRC-949K		South Korea	Vehicle transceiver (tank)	Huneed	VHF/FM	
VRC-964K		South Korea	Vehicle transceiver (armored vehicle)	Huneed	VHF/FM	
KAN/GRC-512(V)		South Korea	Multi-channel radio	Huneed	UHF	
SPIDER		South Korea	2nd generation tactical communication system	Samsung Electronics		The SPIDER system can transmit only still images and voice data.
TICN		South Korea	3rd generation tactical communication system	Samsung Thales, LIG Nex1 and Huneed consortium		
TMMR		South Korea	Tactical multiband multirole radio	LIG Nex1 (formerly LG Precision)	HF/VHF/UHF	
PRC-821K		South Korea	Tactical satellite (TACSAT) radio	Samsung Thales	Satellite	
TSC-791K		South Korea	Mobile and tactical military satellite communication system	LIG Nex1 (formerly LG Precision)	Satellite	

== Radar systems ==
Model	Origin	Type	Manufacturer	Deployment	Quantity	Notes
Low Altitude Surveillance Radars
TPS-830K	South Korea	Mobile short range air search radar	LIG Nex1 (formerly LG Precision)	1994~	54	Use supports KM167A3 Vulcan, K263A1 Chungung and Oerlikon GDF
FPS-303K	South Korea	Medium range air search radar	LIG Nex1 (formerly LG Precision)	2014~16		3D AESA radar connected to early warning and command & control systems, which enhances the ability to detect and track targets at low altitudes
High Altitude Surveillance Radars
TPS-880K	South Korea	Local air defense radar	LIG Nex1 (formerly LG Precision)	2018~		3D AESA radar that performs high and low-altitude surveillance and detects unmanned aerial vehicles and combat aircraft
Artillery/Rocket-Locating Radars
TPQ-74K Sky mirror	South Korea	Counter-battery AESA radar	LIG Nex1 (formerly LG Precision)	2018~	~20	The new TPQ-74K has 30~40% greater detection radius and continuous operating time than the existing Korean-licensed Swedish ARTHUR-K radar systems. Arthur-K has effective detection range of 40 km, while the new system has range of over 60 km. It can also operate continuously for eight hours, compared to Arthur-K's 6 hours. Merely two radars will allow undisturbed operation for 365 days.
AN/TPQ-36 Firefinder	United States	Counter-battery radar	Raytheon	1996	10	
AN/TPQ-37 Firefinder	United States	Counter-battery radar	Raytheon	1996	5	
Saab ARTHUR-K	Sweden; South Korea	Counter-battery radar	LIG Nex1 (formerly LG Precision)	2009~	8	The ARTHUR-K was built in Korea under license by LIG Nex1.

== Optics and night sight systems ==
Model	Origin	Type	Manufacturer	Deployment	Notes
KM-20	South Korea	8x30 military binocular	EO system (formerly Korea Optech)	1995	Standard-issue
PVS-98K	South Korea	Day and night sight	EO system (formerly Korea Optech)	1998	Standard-issue
PVS-01K	South Korea	Thermal weapon sight	EO system (formerly Korea Optech)	2001	Standard-issue
PVS-02K	South Korea	Night weapon sight	EO system (formerly Korea Optech)	2002	Standard-issue
PVS-04K	South Korea	Night monocular scope	EO system (formerly Korea Optech)	2004	Standard-issue
PVS-05K	South Korea	Day and night sight	EO system (formerly Korea Optech)	2005	Standard-issue
PVS-11K	South Korea	Day and night sight	EO system (formerly Korea Optech)	2011	Standard-issue
DCL-120	South Korea	Dot sight	Dong In optical		Limited issue
TAS-970K	South Korea	Thermal observation device	Samsung thales	1997	Standard-issue
TAS-815K	South Korea	Thermal observation device	Samsung thales	2011	Standard-issue

== Artillery ==
The ROK Army operates 11,300 Towed Howitzer's, Self Propelled Howitzer's & Multiple Rocket launchers as of 2025. (This figure does not include mortars).

=== Mortars ===
Mortars	Origin	Type	In service	Manufacturer/Produced	Range	Notes
M-19	United States	60 mm mortar			1,800 m	Kept in reserve/storage
KM-19	United States; South Korea	60 mm mortar		Kia Machine Tool (now Hyundai WIA)/1970s	1,800 m	Made under license
K-181	South Korea	60 mm mortar	2,100	Kia Machine Tool (now Hyundai WIA)/since 1985	3,590 m	
M29	United States	81 mm mortar			4,600 m	Kept in reserve/storage
KM29A1	United States; South Korea	81 mm mortar		Kia Machine Tool (now Hyundai WIA)/1970s	4,600 m	Made under license
KM-187	South Korea	81 mm mortar		Kia Machine Tool (now Hyundai WIA)/since 1996	6,300 m	
KMS114	South Korea	81 mm mortar		Kia Machine Tool (now Hyundai WIA)/since 2021	6,300 m	
KM30	United States; South Korea	107 mm (4.2 in)	1,840	Kia Machine Tool (now Hyundai WIA)/since 1980	5,650 m	Made under license. Will be replaced by the 120 mm mortar
XKM-120	South Korea	120 mm mortar		Kia Machine Tool (now Hyundai WIA)	8,000 m	120 mm self-propelled mortar system that features a computerised fire control system (FCS) and a semi-automatic loading system

=== Towed Artillery (5,800) ===
Howitzer	Images	Origin	Type	In service	Manufacturer/Produced	Range	Notes
M2/M2A1/M3/M101 KM101A1		United States United States; South Korea	105mm towed howitzer	3,000	Rock Island Arsenal/(1941~1953) Kia Machine Tool (now Hyundai WIA)/(1970s)	HE 11.3 km	In reserve/storage Made under license.
M114		United States	155mm towed howitzer	1,400	Rock Island Arsenal/(1941~1953)	HE 14.6 km RAP 19 km	Mainly used by the Republic of Korea Reserve Forces.
KH179		South Korea	155mm towed howitzer	1,400	Kia Machine Tool (now Hyundai WIA)/(since 1983)	HE 22 km RAP 30 km	

=== Self Propelled Artillery ===
Equipment	Images	Origin	Type	In service	Manufacturer/Produced	Notes
K55/K55A1		United States; South Korea	155mm self-propelled howitzer	1,040	Samsung Techwin/(1985~1997)	M109A2 built under license by Samsung Techwin. All K55s have been upgraded to K55A1. Will eventually be replaced by the K9 Thunder.
K9/A1 Thunder		South Korea	155mm self-propelled howitzer	1,240	Samsung Techwin/1999~	Around 1,000 more planned. (complete upgrade of K9A1 to K9A2 by 2027).
K105A1		South Korea	105mm wheeled self-propelled howitzer	200	Samsung Techwin/2017~	Initially called the EVO-105; M101 howitzer mounted on a truck.
Self-propelled mortar
K281A1		South Korea	81mm self-propelled mortar		Doosan	K200 self-propelled mortar variant.
K242A1		South Korea	107mm self-propelled mortar		Doosan	K200 self-propelled mortar variant. To be replaced by the 120mm automatic loading mortar
K532 (Bandvagn 206)		Sweden; South Korea	107mm self-propelled mortar		Kia Motors/1994~	Made under license.
Derivatives
K56 ARV		South Korea	Ammunition resupply vehicle	(700 planned)	Samsung Techwin/2013~	Based on the K55 chassis.
K10 ARV		South Korea	Ammunition resupply vehicle	450	Samsung Techwin/2006~	Based on the K9 chassis.
K77 FDCV		South Korea	Fire direction center vehicle		Samsung Techwin/1990s?	Based on the K55 chassis.

=== Rocket Artillery ===
Artillery	Origin	Image	Type	Version	Manufacturer/Deployment	Maximum range	Launch vehicle	Quantity (rocket)	Notes
K136/A1 Kooryoung	South Korea		Multiple rocket launcher	K-30 (130 mm) K-33 (131 mm)	Hanwha/1981~1987 Hanwha/1987~90s	23 km 36 km	40	140,000 340,000	
M270	United States; South Korea		Multiple rocket launcher	227 mm M270 227 mm M270A1	Lockheed Martin/1998 Lockheed Martin/2008	32 km 45.5 km	48 10	27,684	Hanwha obtained the license to locally produce the 227mm M270 series rockets.
K239 Chunmoo	South Korea		Multiple rocket launcher	239 mm K-MLRS	Hanwha/2015	80 km	367	-	One vehicle can fit 130 mm and 239 mm rockets at once; can also fire 227 mm rockets for M270 compatibility; to replace the K136.

== Air defense ==
The Republic of Korea Air Force (ROKAF) additionally operates MIM-23 Hawk, MIM-104 Patriot and KM-SAM SAMs.

Name	Images	Origin	Type	In service	Deployment	Notes
Towed anti-aircraft gun
KM167A3 Vulcan		United States; South Korea	20mm towed vulcan	≈1,000	1970s ~ 1980s	Built in Korea under license by S&T Dynamics.
Oerlikon 35 mm(GDF-003)		Switzerland; South Korea	35 mm towed anti-aircraft gun	36	1975	Uses Skyguard system, two guns linked to one radar.
Self-propelled anti-aircraft guns
K263A1		South Korea	20mm self-propelled vulcan	200		K200 self-propelled AAA variant.
K30 Biho		South Korea	30mm self-propelled anti-aircraft gun	176		
Self-propelled surface-to-air missile system
K-SAM Chunma		France; South Korea	Short-range self-propelled SAM	120		Crotale NG system in indigenous design by LIG Nex1.
Man-portable air-defense systems
Javelin		United Kingdom	Man-portable air defense system	100 launchers 1,500 missiles	1987	
Mistral		France	Man-portable air defense system	406 launchers 2,760 missiles	1991~1997	
SA-16 Igla-1E		Russia	Man-portable air defense system	50 launchers 750 missiles	1996	Given by Russia as a partial payment of debts incurred during the Soviet era.
Shingung (KP-SAM)		South Korea	Man-portable air defense system		2005~	Under delivery; approximately 2,000 missiles will be fielded.
FIM-92 Stinger		United States	Man-portable air defense system	Phased-out		Transferred from the War Reserve Stock for Allies - Korea; kept in reserve/storage.

== Surface-to-surface missile ==
The Republic of Korea Air Force (ROKAF) operates an additional surface-to- surface missiles. ROKAF has modified U.S.-supplied Nike surface-to-air missiles for a surface-to-surface mission.

Missile		Type	Version	Range (ROK MND official)	CEP	Deployment	First seen in public	In service	Notes
Hyunmoo-1	South Korea	Short-range ballistic missile	1A	180 km (United States estimates its range would have been 250 km)		1986	Armed Forces day 1987	Phased-out	200 more in reserve/storage.
Hyunmoo-2	South Korea	Short-range ballistic missile	2A 2B 2C	300 km 500 km 800 km	30–50 m 30~50 m -	2004 2009 2017	2012 2011 -	30	
Hyunmoo-3	South Korea	GLCM	3A 3B 3C 3D	500 km 1,000 km 1,500 km 3,000 km	1 m	2000s 2006 2011 In development	2000s 2009 2013 -		The Republic of Korea Navy (ROKN) also operates Hyunmoo-3 cruise missiles.
ATACMS	United States	Tactical ballistic missile	Block I Block IA	165 km 300 km		2000 2004		111 110	

== Coastal patrol vessel ==
The Army also operates its own patrol vessels.

Watercraft	Origin	Type	Builder	Displacement	In Service	Notes
PBR-15	South Korea	Army patrol boat	Kangnam Corporation	21 tonnes	26	Primary mission is search and reconnaissance operations within 3 miles (5 km) of the Korean coastline.

== Aircraft ==
ROK Army operates a total of (982) Helicopters including (147) Attack Helicopters.

Aircraft		Type	Version	Deployment	Quantity	Notes
Bell 505	United States	Training helicopter		2023~2025	50	
Bell AH-1 Cobra	United States	Attack	AH-1F/S	1977~1991	75	
Boeing AH-64 Apache	United States	Attack	AH-64E Guardian	2016~2017	72	28 on order.
Boeing CH-47 Chinook	United States	Heavy transport	CH-47D CH-47DLR	1988~1998	35	ROKA received a total of 29 CH-47D and 6 CH-47DLR.
Boeing CH-47 Chinook	United States	Heavy transport	CH-47F	2022~2025	20	
KAI KUH-1 Surion	South Korea	Utility transport	KUH-1	2012~	218	245 more on order.
KAI LAH	South Korea	Attack	LAH	2022~	200 on order	Ordered in 2022 delivered from 2022 to 2031.
MD Helicopters MD 500 Defender	United States	Light attack	MD-500 Defender MD-500 TOW Defender	1976~1988	250 50	Built under license by Korean Air Aerospace Division (KAL-ASD).
Messerschmitt MBB Bo 105	West Germany	Light attack	Bo 105CBS	1999~2000	12	Built under license by Korea Aerospace Industries.
Sikorsky UH-60 Black Hawk	United States	Utility transport	UH-60P	1990~1999	200	Built under license by Korean Air Aerospace Division (KAL-ASD). Includes Navy and Air Force aircraft.
Unmanned aerial vehicles
KAI RQ-101 Songgolmae	South Korea	Reconnaissance	RQ-101	2001	4 corps	
IAI Searcher	Israel	Reconnaissance	Searcher II	2005	2 corps	
Elbit Skylark	Israel	Reconnaissance	Skylark II	2009		
Ucon system RemoEye	South Korea	Reconnaissance	Battalion-level(RemoEye 002,006)	2009		Standard-issue.
IAI Heron-1	Israel	Reconnaissance	Heron-1	~2015	0 (3)	On order.
Korean Air KUS-DUAS	South Korea	Reconnaissance	Division-level	2015		
Korean Air KUS-FT	South Korea	RSTA	Company-level	~2016		Two systems per company.

== Auxiliary systems ==
System	Origin	Type	In service	Notes
KM138	United States; South Korea	Minelayer		Built by Samsung Techwin under license.
M58 MICLIC	United States	Mine clearing line charge		
MILES	United States	Training device		Equipped for Korea Combat Training Center.

== Future equipment ==
=== Small arms ===
Model	Manufacturer	Image	Origin	Type	Caliber	Notes
Assault rifles, carbines & battle rifles
K13	SNT Motiv		South Korea	Carbine	5.56×45mm NATO	Formally called STC-16. Planned to replace the K1A as standard-issue carbine. About 1,700 units were delivered and deployed to special forces. However, reports soon emerged of cartridge explosions during live fire exercises.
K17	SNT Motiv		South Korea	Carbine	5.56×45mm NATO	Planned to replace the K1A as standard-issue carbine About 15,000 units will be deliver and deploy to all branches, approximately 1,500 K17s are scheduled to be delivered in 2026, followed by more than 14,000 in 2027
Machine guns
K15	SNT Motiv		South Korea	Light machine gun	5.56×45mm NATO	Future standard-issue squad automatic weapon
K16	SNT Motiv		South Korea	General-purpose machine gun	7.62×51mm NATO	Formerly S&T Motiv K12. Replacing the M60

=== Logistics ===
Vehicle	Origin	Type	Payload	Quantity	Manufacturer	Notes
Kia 4×4 truck "Medium Standard Vehicle"	South Korea	Tactical transport truck	2.5 tonnes	7,000	Kia Motors	
Kia 6×6 truck "5-tonne Bulletproof Kit Vehicle"	South Korea	Armoured truck	5 tonnes	3,400	Kia Motors	
