= Samyang Comtech =

South Korean defence company

Samyang Comtech Co., Ltd.
- Native name: 주식회사 삼양컴텍
- Formerly: Oriental Industry (1962–2006)
- Type: Public
- Traded as: KRX: 484590
- Industry: Defense
- Founded: 22 December 1962; 63 years ago
- Headquarters: 16, Banpo-daero 27-gil, Seocho-gu, Seoul, South Korea
- Area served: Worldwide
- Key people: Kim Jong-il (CEO)
- Products: Aircraft parts; Body armor; Ceramic bulletproof plates; Composite armor for military vehicles; Composite components
- Revenue: ▲ ₩154.6 billion (2025)
- Operating income: ▲ ₩26.6 billion (2025)
- Net income: ▲ ₩22.7 billion (2025)
- Total assets: ▲ ₩239.7 billion (2025)
- Total equity: ▲ ₩156.5 billion (2025)
- Owner: Zeo Holdings (44.69%); Employee stock ownership (1.27%)
- Number of employees: 511 (December, 2024)
- Parent: Samyang Chemical Industry
- Website: Official website in English; Official website in Korean

- Samyang Comtech
- Hangul: 삼양컴텍
- Hanja: 三洋複合技術
- RR: Samyang keomtek
- MR: Samyang k'ŏmt'ek

Samyang Comtech Co., Ltd. (Korean: 삼양컴텍) or Samyang Composite Technology is a South Korean ballistic protection solution manufacturer founded in 1962. It was designated as a defense contractor by the South Korean government in 1973 and supplies combat helmets and bulletproof vests for infantry to the Republic of Korea Armed Forces, and also manufactures silicon carbide-based ceramic armors for armored vehicles such as the K1A1, K2 Black Panther and Altay. Most products manufactured by Samyang Comtech are made of Dyneema material, except for military vehicle armors.

== History ==
Samyang Comtech was founded on 22 December 1962 under the name Oriental Industry (Korean: 오리엔탈공업; RR: Oliental Gongeop) and In 1973, the company was designated as a defense contractor by the government.

In 1990, the R&D Laboratory was established for the development of new products, and in May 1997, the first domestic bulletproof helmet and bulletproof vest were developed for the South Korean military.

In June 1998, it began producing Korean Special Armor Plate (KSAP), the first domestic composite armor for main battle tanks developed for the K1A1.

In 2003, it developed KH-B2000, the world's lightest ballistic helmet, weighing 1,115 grams.

In September 2006, the company name was changed from Oriental Industry to Samyang Comtech (Samyang Composite Technology).

In June 2008, it was developed the special armor plate for the K2 Black Panther.

In December 2008, it was designated as a co-developer of a project responsible for transferring KSAP-based armor package technology to develop Turkish Altay MBT.

In 2011, it was developed armor kit for the light tactical vehicle (LTV) and an add-on armor for the wheeled armored vehicle (WAV).

In 2018, it was developed add-on armor for the 30 mm wheeled anti-aircraft guns, command post wheeled armored vehicle, and K239 Chunmoo export versions.

In 2019, it was developed steel ball filing for new 81 mm mortar.

== Business area ==
Samyang Comtech supplies various ballistic protection solutions for the ROK Armed Forces, such as armors for military vehicles, aircraft parts, composite material parts, and ceramic bulletproof plates.

=== Ballistic protection ===
==== Military vehicles ====
- Armor for main battle tank (MBT)
- Armor for infantry fighting vehicle (IFV)
- Add-on armor for KAAV
- Ceramic armor for K21 IFV
- Bulletproof panel for K151 Raycolt light tactical vehicle (LTV)
- Armor for K239 Chunmoo multiple launch rocket system (MLRS)
- Armor for K808/806 White Tiger wheeled armoured vehicle (WAV)
- Armor for K30W Sky Tiger 30 mm anti-aircraft gun vehicle (AAGV)
- Armor kit for KAAK
- Armored case for Commander's Panoramic Sight (CPS)

==== Body armors ====
- SAV-I (Special Armor Vest) Fragments body armor for army
- SAV-II Bulletproof body armor for army
- SAV-III Bulletproof body armor for special force
- SAV-IV Bulletproof body armor for riot police
- SAV-V Bulletproof body armor for police
- SAV-VI Floating body armor for navy
- SAV-VII Concealable body armor for civilian and VIP
- Anti-stab vest
- Nylon-based Bangtan Helmet. Export designation SBH-I (Special Ballistic Helmet)
- SBH-II Aramid (Kevlar, Twaron) helmet
- KH-B2000 (SBH-III) Ultra-high molecular weight polyethylene (UHMW PE) helmet
- SAP-I (Special Armor Plate) UHMW PE (Dyneema, Spectra) armor plate
- SAP-II Hybrid armor plate
- SAP-III Hybrid armor plate

==== Naval vessels ====
- Protection panel for naval vessel

=== Aircraft parts ===
- Soundproof panel assembly
- Protection panel assembly
- Gunner seat and troop seat
- Protection panel for FCS
- Exhaust stack for helicopter
- Fuel tank for fixed-wing aircraft
- Fuel tank for helicopter

=== Composite components ===
- Protection cover for POD radome
- IFF system
- Pole and spreader for mobile camouflage net system (MCNS)
- Fuel tank for MBT
- Protection cover for K-SAM Pegasus
- Steel ball filing
- Protection cover for electro-optical targeting system (EOTS)
- Detonator part
- Fuse part for K414 fragmentation grenade
- Fuse assembly for KM201A smoke grenade
- Antenna reflector panel

=== Ceramic bulletproof plates ===
- Oxide ceramic (Aluminium oxide, Aluminium oxide-Silicon dioxide) plates for body armor and vehicle armor
- Non oxide ceramic (Silicon carbide) plates for main battle tank and armored vehicle

== Corporate governance ==
=== Ownership ===
Major shareholders as of July 2026
Shareholder	Country	Shares	Stake (%)
Zeo Holdings	South Korea	18,415,300	44.69%
Samyang Comtech Employee stock ownership	South Korea	522,000	1.27%

== See also ==
- Defense industry of South Korea
