= KH-B2000 =

South Korean combat helmet

KH-B2000 New Type Bangtan Helmet
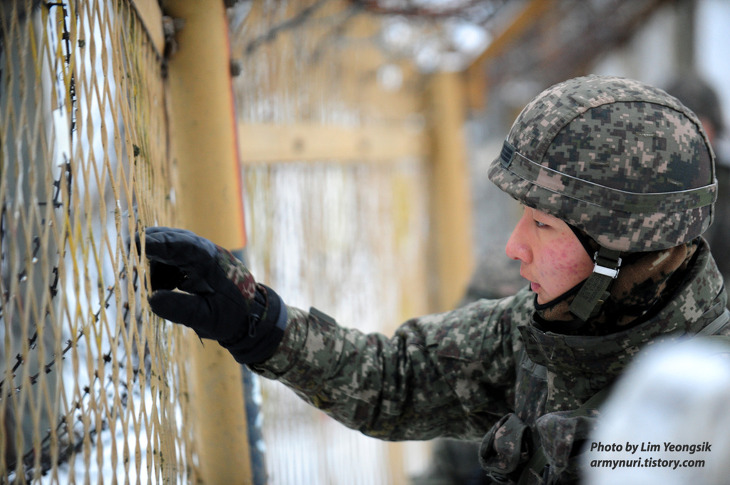
- Republic of Korea Army personnel wearing KH-B2000 helmet
- Type: Combat helmet
- Place of origin: South Korea

Service history
- In service: 2003–present
- Used by: See Users
- Wars: Iraq War; War in Afghanistan; Russo-Ukrainian war

Production history
- Designer: Silver Star Company; Oriental Industry
- Designed: 1997–2003
- Manufacturer: Silver Star Company; Oriental Industry (2003–2006); Samyang Company (2006–2008); Samyang Comtech (2008–present)
- Produced: 2-point strap: 2003–2013; 4-point strap: 2013–present

Specifications
- Weight: 1,150 g

The KH-B2000, originally known as New Type Bangtan Helmet (Korean: 신형 방탄 헬멧; Bangtan is Korean for "anti-ballistic" or "bulletproof"), is a combat helmet developed by South Korea from 1997 to 2003.

Korean media incorrectly named the helmet a Fritz Helmet when it was first released to public in 2003.

== History ==
Production began in 2003, and was first issued to Zaytun Division for the Iraq War in 2004.

The KH-B2000 is currently being gradually withdrawn from active service in combat units and replaced by the KCI-105.

== Development ==
Discussion on the development of the new bulletproof helmet began in 1993 after it was pointed out that Bangtan Helmet, featuring nylon composite material, offers significantly less protection compared to the United States' Personnel Armor System for Ground Troops (PASGT) counterpart.

The helmet is made with ultra-high-molecular-weight polyethylene (UHMWPE), which increased the protection capability by more than two times compared to older Bangtan Helmet while achieving weight of only 1,150 g. The KH-B2000 is also one of the world's lightest infantry ballistic helmets made of composite materials since 2003.

In the 1996 Gangneung submarine infiltration incident showed that Bangtan Helmet was useless against rifle fire; a soldier was shot dead by a helmet penetration shot from .223 Remington (5.56x45mm) fired from the M16 rifle by North Korean infiltrators. Therefore, a development plan was issued in the same year. Eunseong and Oriental Industry (now Samyang Comtech), the manufacturers of Bangtan Helmet, began the development for a new ballistic helmet in 1997.

== Gallery ==
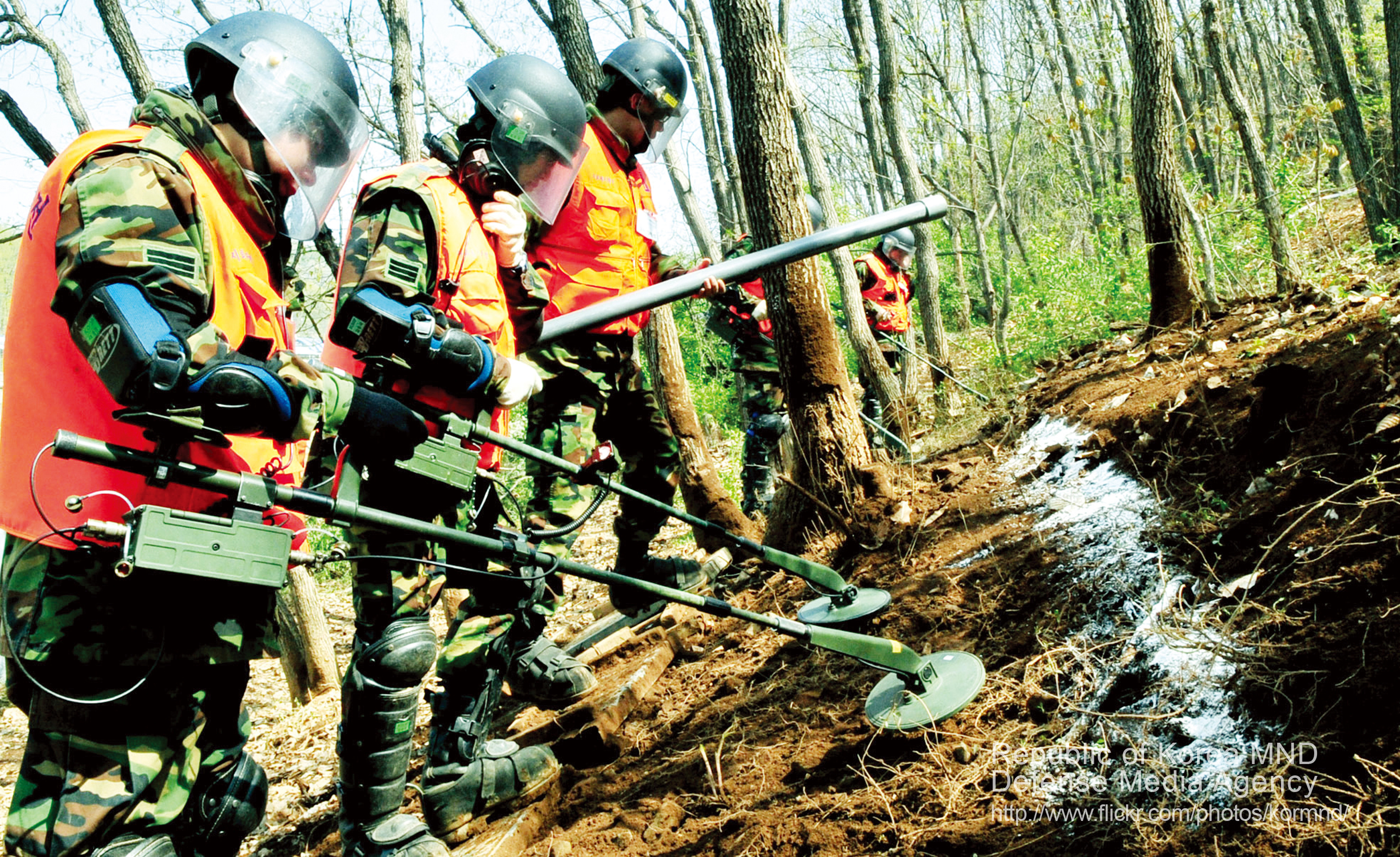
102nd Engineer Battalion of the Army 1st Engineer Brigade of ROKA (then) wearing KHB-2000 combat helmet. Note: Their helmet equipped with visor (wire mesh).

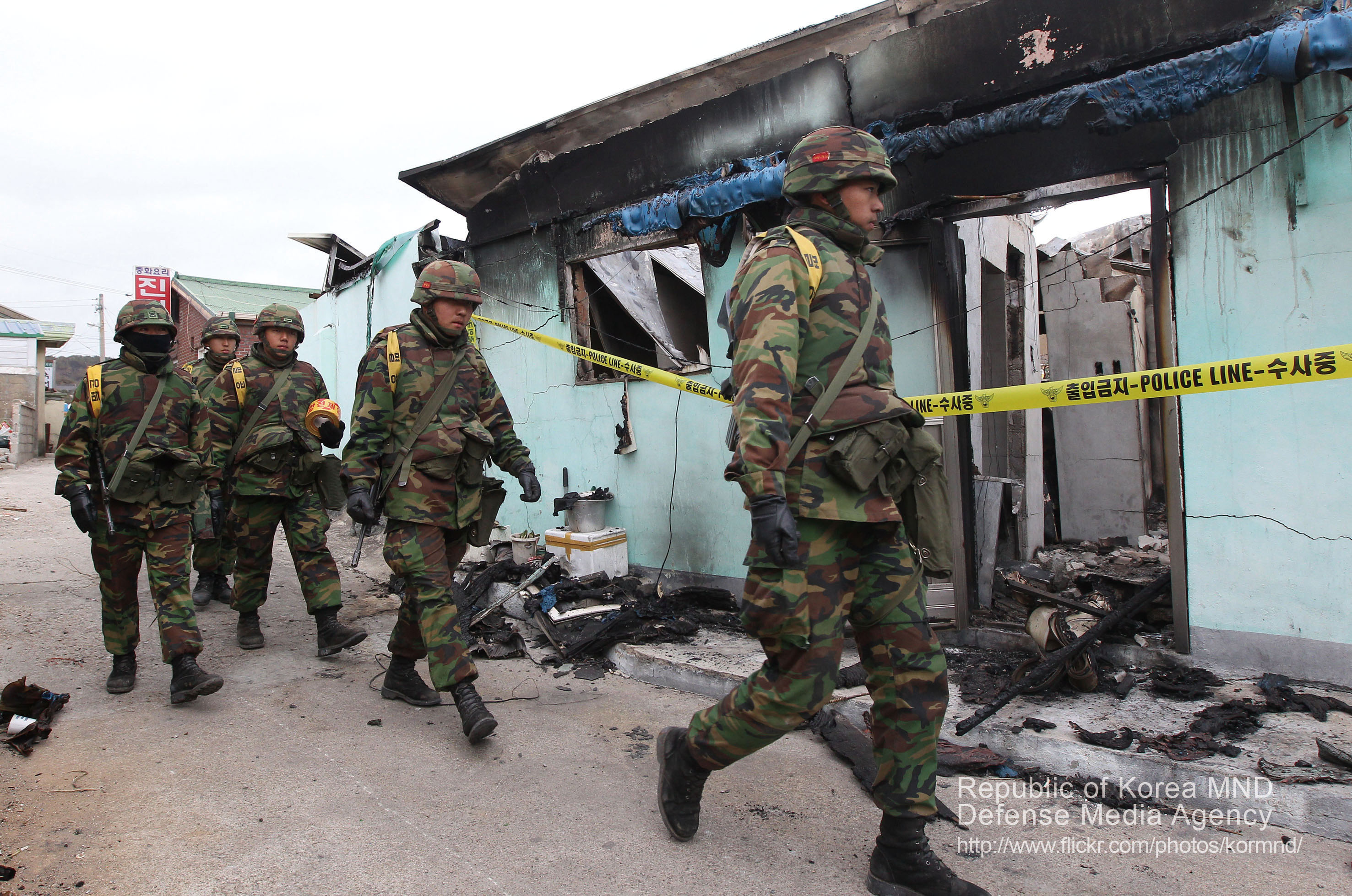
ROK Marine Corps (then) equipped with KHB-2000 combat helmet

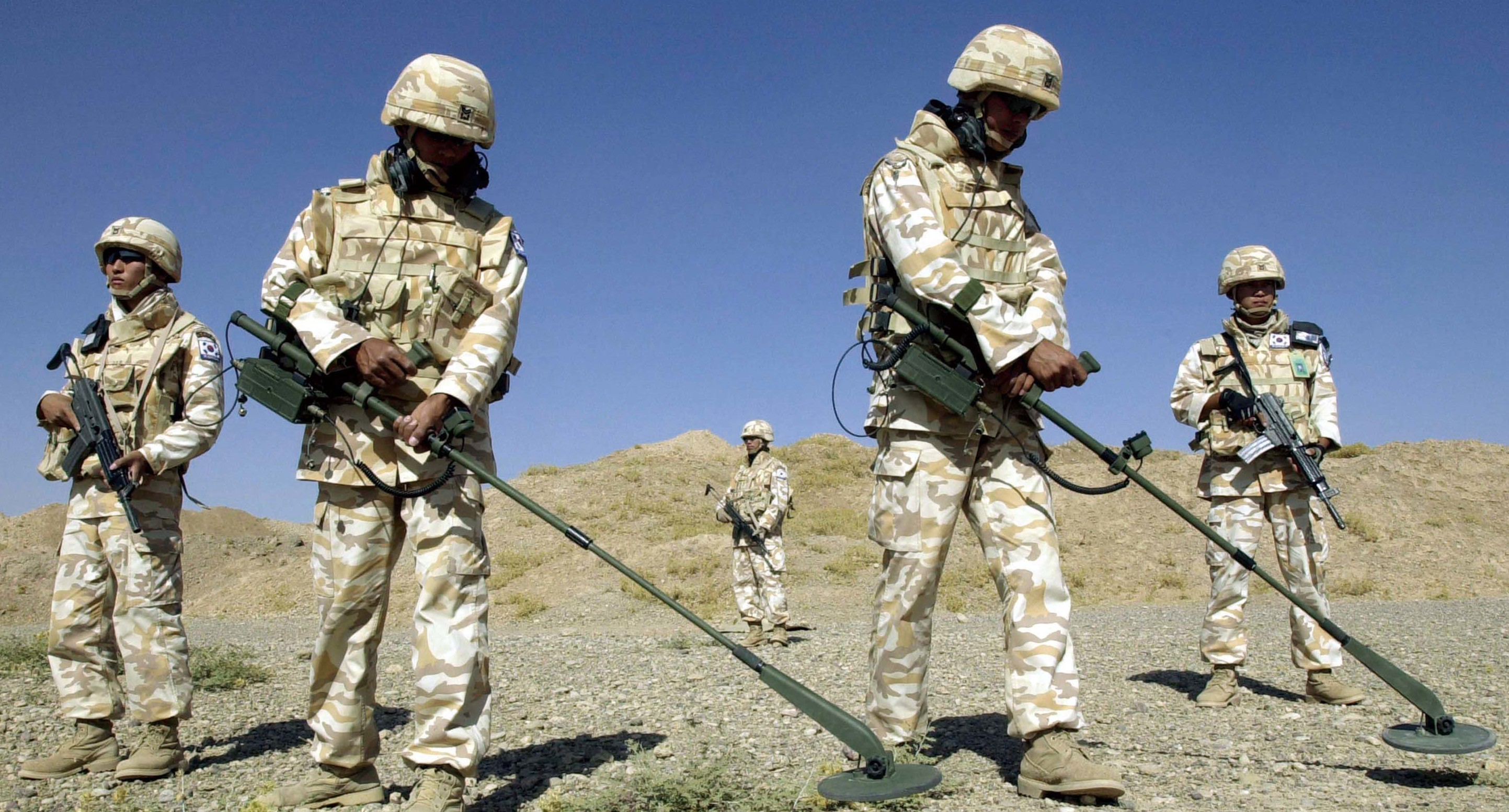
South Korean soldiers wearing KHB-2000 combat helmet in Iraq. 2004

== Users ==
- Ghana: 2,000 in 2004.
- Iraq: 48,000 in 2007 to 2008.
- Kuwait: At least 57 in 2004 and onward.
- Saudi Arabia: 8,500 in 2003.
- Republic of Korea: Standard combat helmet since 2004. Several other troop units began using the KCI-105, a locally made ACH/MICH-based helmet.
- Philippines: Purchased 8,100 units in 2004, distributed between Philippine Army and Philippine Marine Corps. Delivered starting 2005.
- Uganda: Purchased in 2013.
- Ukraine: Included in the South Korean non-lethal supplies package since March 2022.
- United States: 2,000 in 2004.
- Venezuela: 1,800 in 2003.
