= IPX Ultra-high-molecular-weight polyethylene =

Engineered polyethylene compound

IPX 2000 ultra-high-molecular-weight polyethylene (IPX 2000, IPX UHMW, IPX UHMW-PE, IPX-UHMW-PE) is an engineered polyethylene compound developed to maintain many traits of UHMW, while increasing abrasion resistance, UV stability and decreasing friction and thermal expansion. IPX UHMW was developed in the early 2000s by material scientists at Interstate Plastics in Sacramento, CA and was first brought to market in 2005 by Interstate Plastics, under the trademark IPX.

IPX 2000 UHMW is naturally red in color, and not approved for direct food contact like virgin UHMW. IPX maintains a high resistance to corrosive chemicals except oxidizing acids; and offers even lower moisture absorption and a lower coefficient of friction versus UHMW. IPX UHMW is self-lubricating; and is highly resistant to abrasion.

Its coefficient of friction is significantly lower than that of traditional UHMW, and greatly lower than nylon and acetal. While polytetrafluoroethylene (PTFE, Teflon) is normally regarded as having a lower coefficient of friction versus UHMW, IPX UHMW has a comparable coefficient at .09, measuring almost as low as PTFE's coefficient of .07 in a standard ATSM D1894 test.

== Uses and Applications ==
Applications for IPX are the same as UHMW and include gears, springs, plates, bushings and housings. IPX UHMW is not approved for food contact.

=== Industrial ===
Conveyor guide rails, belt scrapers, chain guides, suspension wear plates, rider plates, idler rollers, guide Shoes, wear strips and shoes.

=== Machined Parts ===
Sprockets, wheels, bearings, pinion gears, flanged rollers.
