= K151 Raycolt =

South Korean light military vehicles

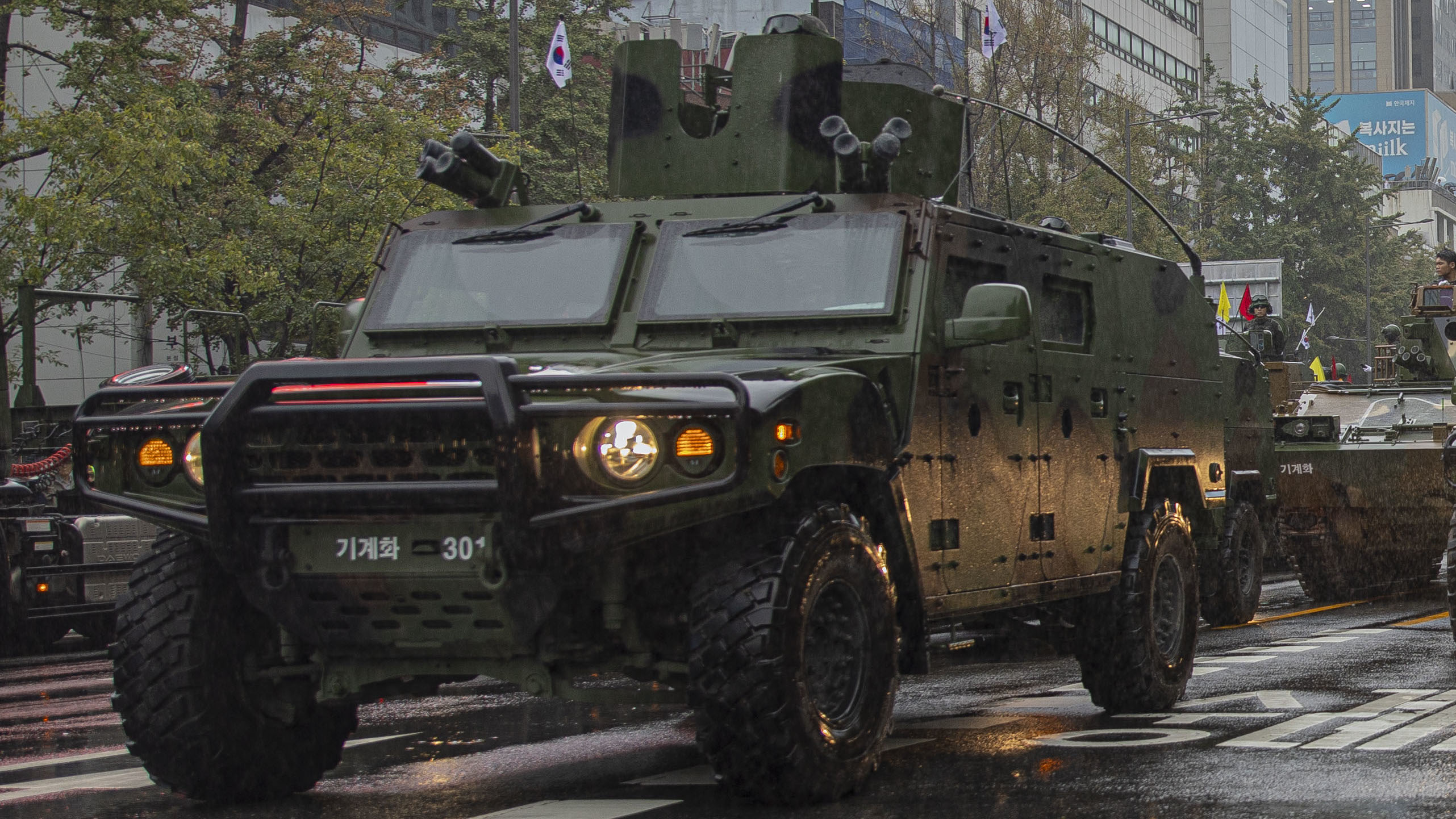
- Republic of Korea Army K153 armored reconnaissance vehicle
- Type: Light utility vehicle Infantry mobility vehicle
- Place of origin: South Korea

Service history
- In service: 2017–present
- Used by: See Operators

Production history
- Designer: Kia Motors
- Designed: 2014
- Manufacturer: Kia Motors
- Unit cost: Standard cabin: ₩100 million Armored cabin: ₩150 million (2018); Export variants: ₩200 million (2023)
- Produced: 2016–present
- Variants: See Variants

Specifications
- Mass: Short wheelbase: 5,700 kilograms (12,600 lb); Long wheelbase: 7,000 kilograms (15,000 lb)
- Length: Short wheelbase: 4,900 millimeters (16.1 ft); Long wheelbase: 5,950 millimeters (19.52 ft)
- Width: 2,195 millimeters (7.201 ft)
- Height: Short wheelbase: 1,980 millimeters (6.50 ft); Long wheelbase: 2,750 millimeters (9.02 ft)
- Crew: 1 (driver), more depending on configuration
- Passengers: 1–7
- Armor: Samyang Comtech Ceramic / Polymer matrix composites (STANAG 4569 level 2–3)
- Main armament: It can be armed with Weapons such as the: AT-1K Raybolt ATGM; K4 grenade launcher K16 machine gun M60 machine gun M240 machine gun Mk 19 grenade launcher WKM-Bm heavy machine gun UKM-2000P machine gun
- Engine: Hyundai S2 D6EB 3.0L V6 diesel 225 hp (168 kW)
- Power/weight: 32.14–39.47 hp/t (23.96–29.43 kW/t)
- Payload capacity: 1,000–3,000 kg (2,200–6,600 lb) depending on configuration
- Transmission: Hyundai Powertech A8TR1 8-speed automatic
- Suspension: 4x4 wheeled
- Ground clearance: 405–410 mm (15.9–16.1 in)
- Fuel capacity: 76 liters (20 U.S. gal)
- Operational range: 560–640 km (350–400 mi)
- Maximum speed: 130 km/h (81 mph)

The K151 Raycolt (Korean: 현마 "Hyeon-ma", Hanja: 現馬) or the Kia Light Tactical Vehicle (KLTV) is a light utility vehicle released by South Korea's Kia Motors. It entered full production in 2016 and entered service with the Republic of Korea Army the following year.

It was originally designed to meet the needs of the South Korean armed forces, and was developed with assistance and funding from the South Korean Ministry of National Defense. It is also eyed as a replacement for the existing fleet of Kia KM420 and KM450 utility vehicles in South Korean military service. In addition to South Korea, the vehicle is operated by Mali and has been used in UN peacekeeping operations in Lebanon and South Sudan.

== History ==
The Kia KLTV was first displayed in the International Defence Exhibition and Conference (IDEX) 2015 held in Abu Dhabi, UAE. After starting production in 2016, about 60 vehicles were deployed to the Republic of Korea Army in January 2017.

The KLTV Weapon Carrier, which is designated K151 in ROK service, was displayed in Asian Defense, Security & Crisis Management Exhibition and Conference (ADAS) 2016 and 2018 in Manila, Philippines, which is a huge market for military vehicles from Kia Motors. Kia announced that two KLTVs were in the Philippines during the ADAS 2018 event for testing.

The KLTV181 Armored Personnel Carrier variant, which is officially called K152 in ROK service, was presented in Defense Expo (DX) Korea 2018. The K151 Weapon Carrier was also displayed at the International Defense Exhibition and Seminar (IDEAS) 2018 in Karachi, Pakistan, as interest from the Pakistani Army on the vehicle was said to be high.

In 2018, the KLTV is being proposed to the Pakistani Army in a partnership effort with the Hajvairy Group during the IDEAS 2018 convention.

As of 2019, the Philippines has received three KLTVs for technical evaluation.

In August 2023, the Polish Ministry of National Defense signed a contract with the Polska Grupa Zbrojeniowa (PGZ SA) and Rosomak SA to acquire Light Reconnaissance Vehicles (LPRs), Polish-made versions of the Raycolt.

In November 2025, Peru established a plant to manufacture K808 and KLTVs under Army Weapons and Ammunition Factory (FAME S.A.C.).

=== Operational history ===
Kia KLTV is currently operated by the armed forces of the Republic of Korea and Mali. The Kia KLTV has been used in UN peacekeeping operations in Lebanon and in South Sudan by South Korea. It is also being used by the Malian Armed Forces for counter-insurgency operation.

== Design ==
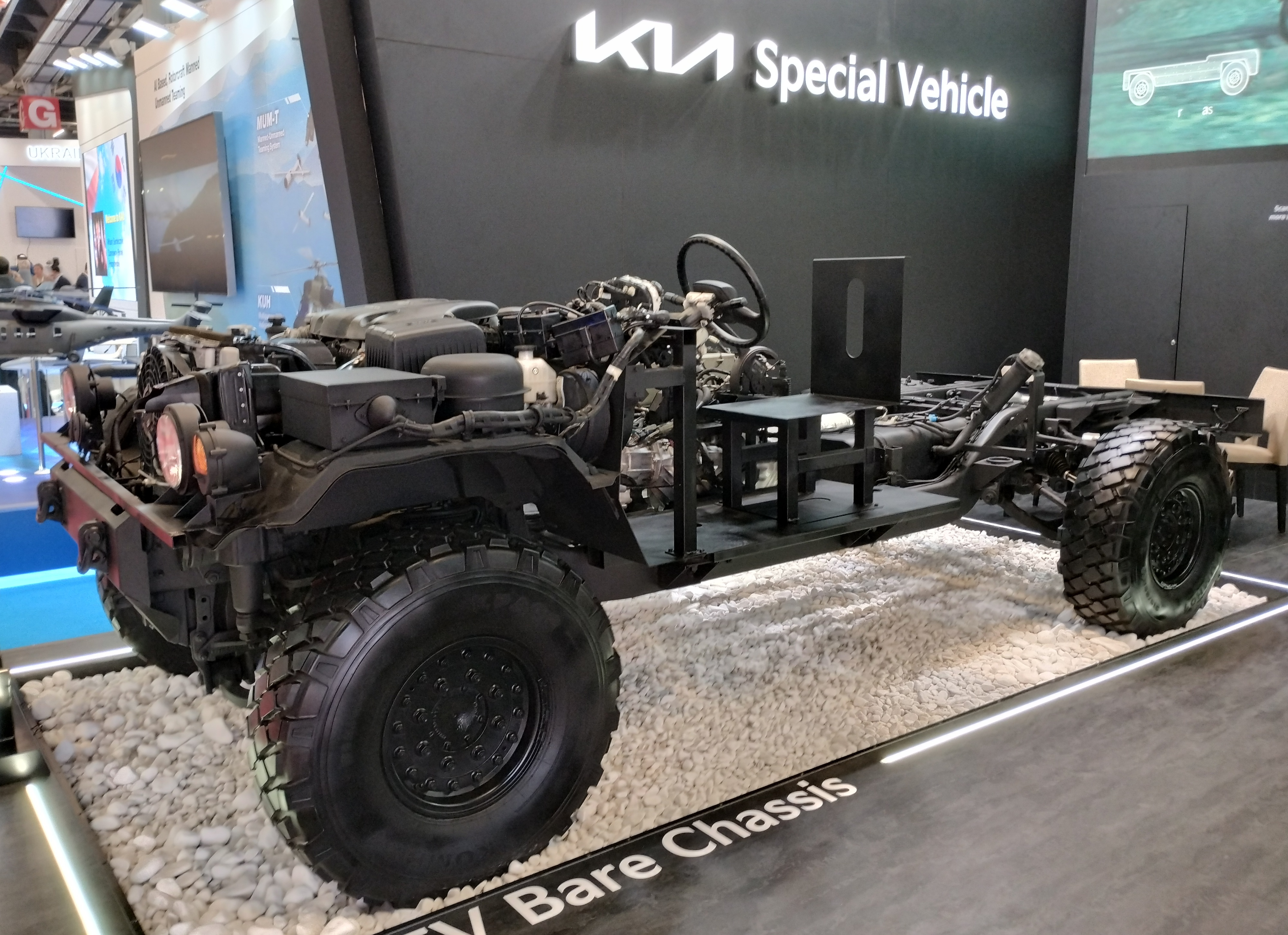
KLTV bare chassis

Compared to previous generation of light utility vehicles developed by Kia, the KLTV was designed combining mobility, survivability, and practicality in mind. It was developed with modularization of its basic chassis and using for various derivative models including standard, long wheel base, armored, and armed variants.

The basic 4-door variant can carry one driver and three passengers, while a single-cab variant is also available. Modular compartments can be used on both single and double cab variants.

Both standard and armored variants are available, with the armored variant having extra protection including bullet-proof windshields and door glass, composite panels and doors, mine-protected flooring, blast-absorbing seats, and gunner protective armor. Samyang Comtech, a South Korean manufacturer of bulletproof ballistic armors, produces KLTV's bulletproof panel.

Weapons can be mounted on the roof opening, including manually operated canopy weapon mounts or remote-controlled weapon systems. Weapon mounts could be for 7.62mm or 12.7mm machine guns, 40mm automatic grenade launchers, or anti-tank missiles.

A 10 kW power generator can be added to provide power for RCWS and other equipment like communication radios and computers, special equipment and other electric-operated optional equipment.

== Models ==
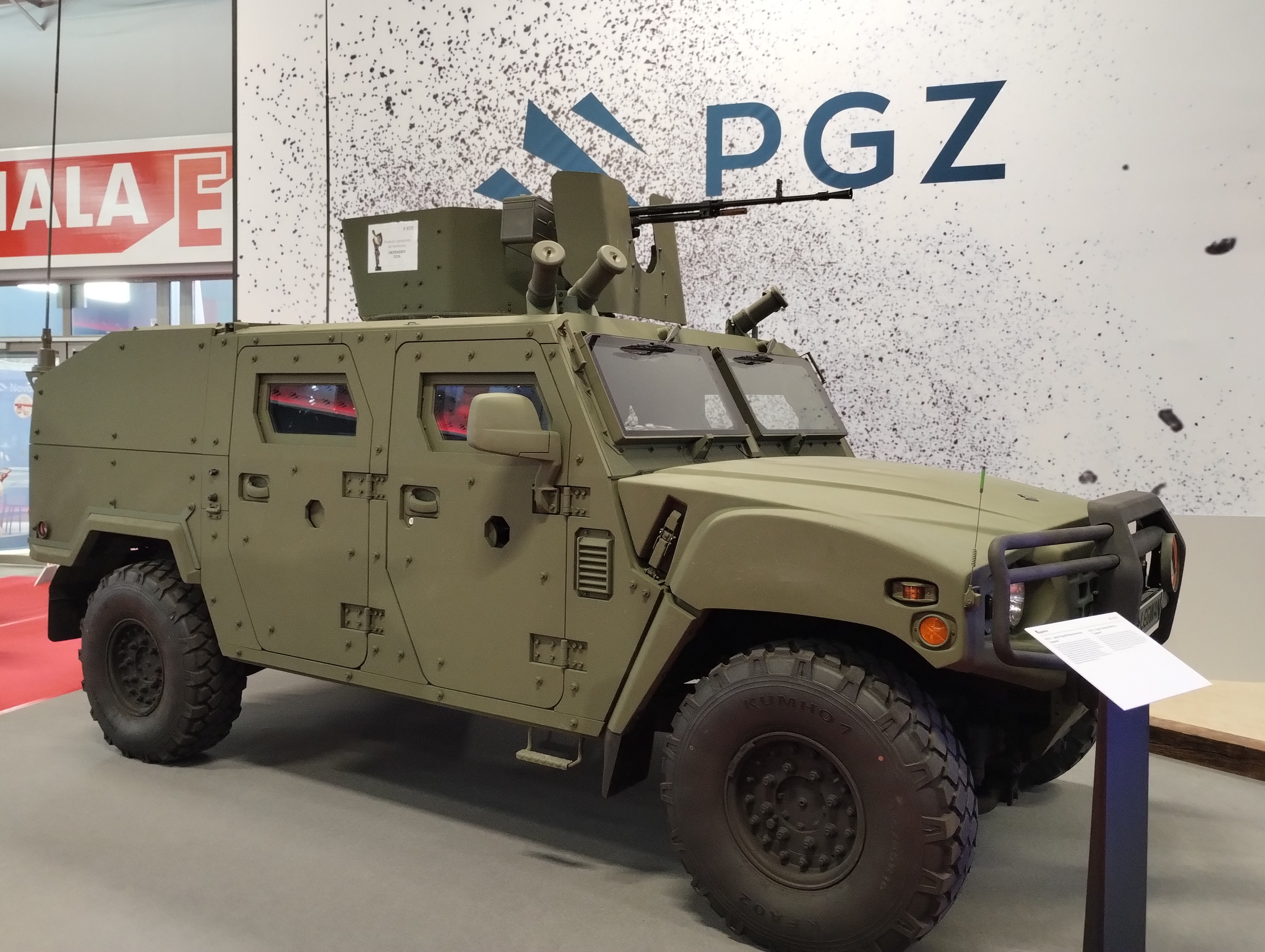
Polish Legwan K153 short wheelbase vehicle

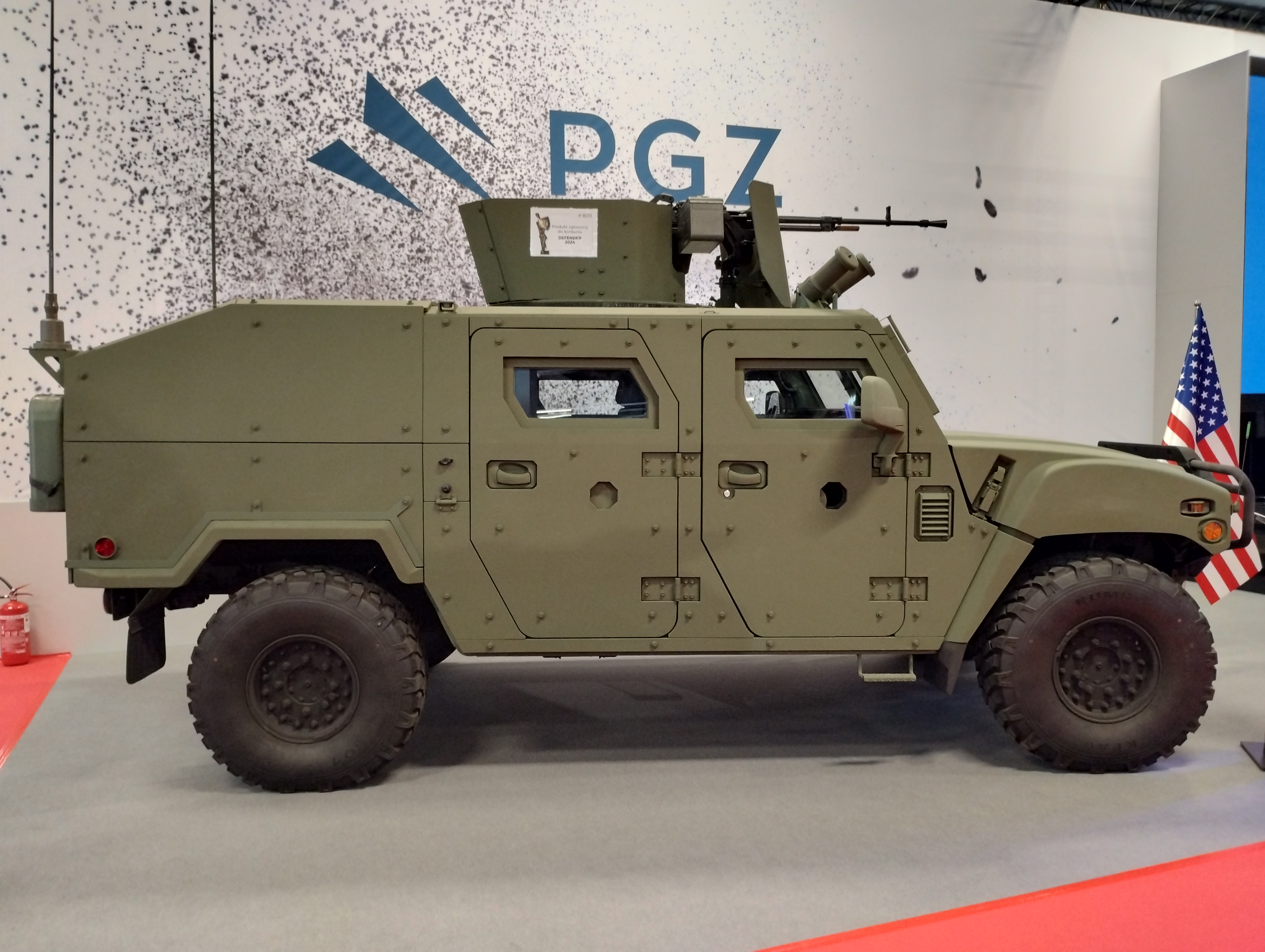
K153 side view

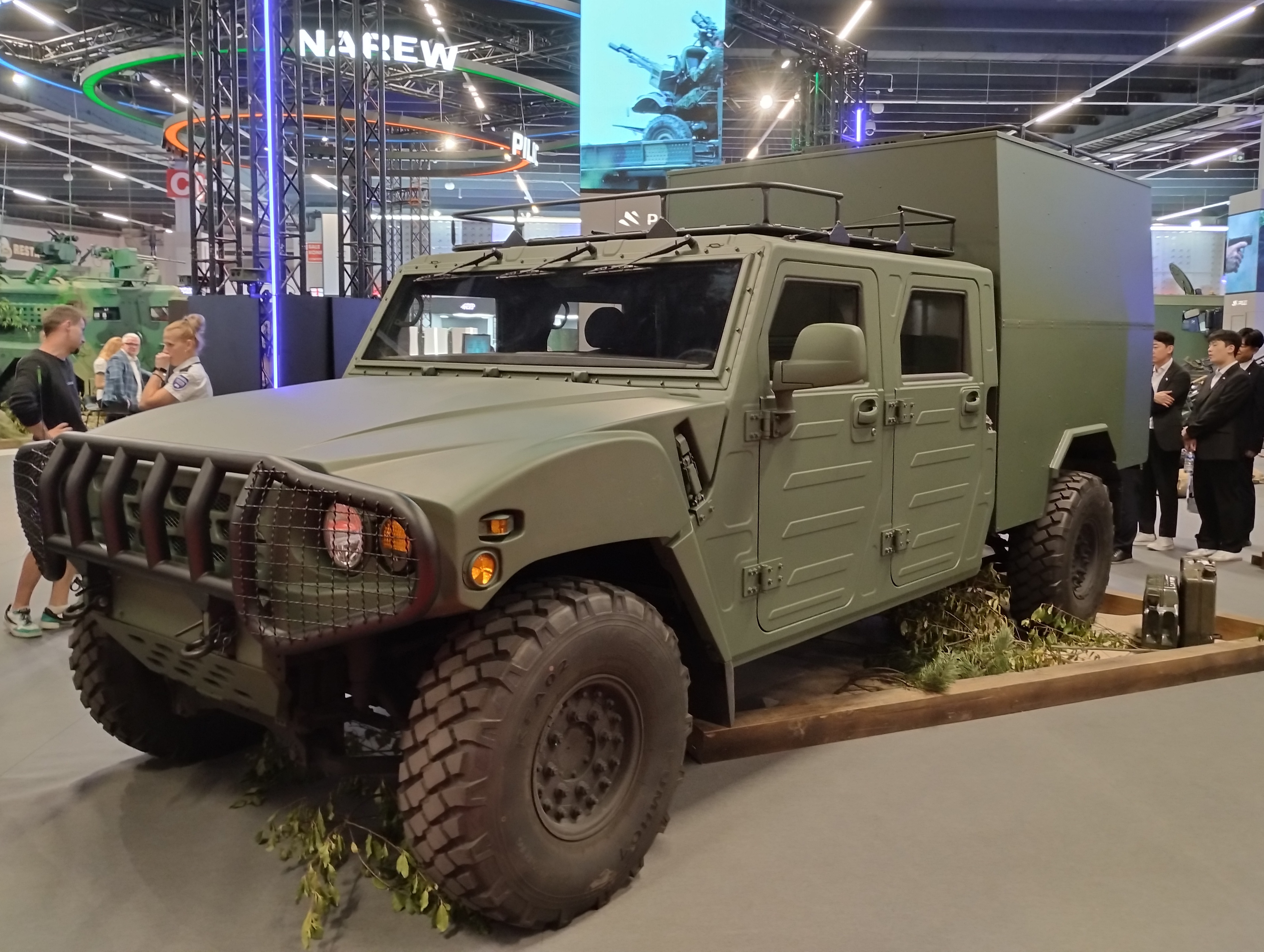
Legwan long wheelbase shelter cargo truck

=== Short wheelbase armored cabin ===
- K151 Armored Command Vehicle (base trim) - A military field vehicle for battalion commanders with an armored cabin and three passenger seats. Export designation KLTV151 (formerly KLTV141)
  - K151C Weapon Carrier - A Manually operated machine gun or anti-tank guided missile (ATGM) launcher mounted vehicle
- K152 Armored Personnel Carrier - A short wheelbase vehicle for troop transport with seven passenger seats. Export designation KLTV181
- K153 Armored Reconnaissance Vehicle - A short wheelbase vehicle for day and night reconnaissance missions with armored cabin. export designation KLTV182
  - K153C Armored Reconnaissance Vehicle - An armored reconnaissance vehicle modified to meet STANAG 4569 level 2 or 3 requirements based on K153.

=== Short wheelbase standard cabin ===
- K154 Artillery Observer Vehicle (base trim) - The vehicle, designated KLTV280 in the export market, was originally designed as a multi-purpose vehicle with seven passenger seats, but was modified for the observation mission of the artillery unit in the Republic of Korea Army.
  - K154C Cargo Truck - A short wheelbase vehicle equipped with a deck for troop and cargo transport. Export designation KLTV223

=== Long wheelbase standard cabin ===
- K351 Shop Van (base trim) - A field shop van with a wide variety of maintenance tools and spare parts. Export designation KLTV204
  - K351C Cab Chassis Truck - A cap chassis truck that can mount various add-on superstructure modules. Export designation KLTV240
    - KLTV243 Cargo Truck - A long wheelbase vehicle equipped with a deck for troop and cargo transport.
    - NBC Reconnaissance Vehicle - A long wheelbase vehicle with nuclear, biological and chemical detection equipment mounted.
    - Shelter Cargo Truck - A long wheelbase vehicle capable of mounting various superstructures, such as communication systems.

== Specifications ==
	K151 (KLTV151)	K152 (KLTV181)	K153 (KLTV182)	K154 (KLTV280)	K154C (KLTV223)	K351 (KLTV204)	K351C (KLTV240)
Vehicle type	Armored command vehicle	Armored personnel carrier	Armored reconnaissance vehicle	Artillery observer vehicle	Cargo truck	Shop van	Cab chassis truck
Seat	1 + 3	1 + 7	1 + 4	1 + 7	1 + 1	1 + 3	
Gross weight	5,700 kg (12,600 lb)					7,000 kg (15,000 lb)	
Overall length	4,900 mm (16.1 ft)				5,250 mm (17.22 ft)	5,950 mm (19.52 ft)	6,000 mm (20 ft)
Overall width	2,195 mm (7.201 ft)						
Overall height	1,980 mm (6.50 ft)	2,320 mm (7.61 ft)			2,550 mm (8.37 ft)	2,750 mm (9.02 ft)	2,550 mm (8.37 ft)
Ground clearance	410 mm (16 in)	405 mm (15.9 in)		410 mm (16 in)		405 mm (15.9 in)	
Payload	1,300 kg (2,900 lb)	1,000 kg (2,200 lb)		1,900 kg (4,200 lb)	2,000 kg (4,400 lb)	1,900 kg (4,200 lb)	3,000 kg (6,600 lb)
Engine power	225 hp (168 kW) / 3,200 rpm						
Engine torque	51 kg⋅m (370 lb⋅ft) / 1,750 rpm						
Maximum speed	130 km/h (81 mph)						
Gradient	60 %						
Turning radius	7.8 m (26 ft)					9.2 m (30 ft)	
Fording depth	760 mm (30 in)						
Cruising range	640 km (400 mi)					560 km (350 mi)	
Option	Turret system Remote controlled weapon station (RCWS); Spare tire and carrier Run-flat tire				None	10 kW generator in powertrain	
Variants	K151C Weapon Carrier	None	K153C Armored Reconnaissance Vehicle	K154C Cargo Truck	None	K351C Cab Chassis Truck	KLTV243 Cargo Truck

== Operators ==
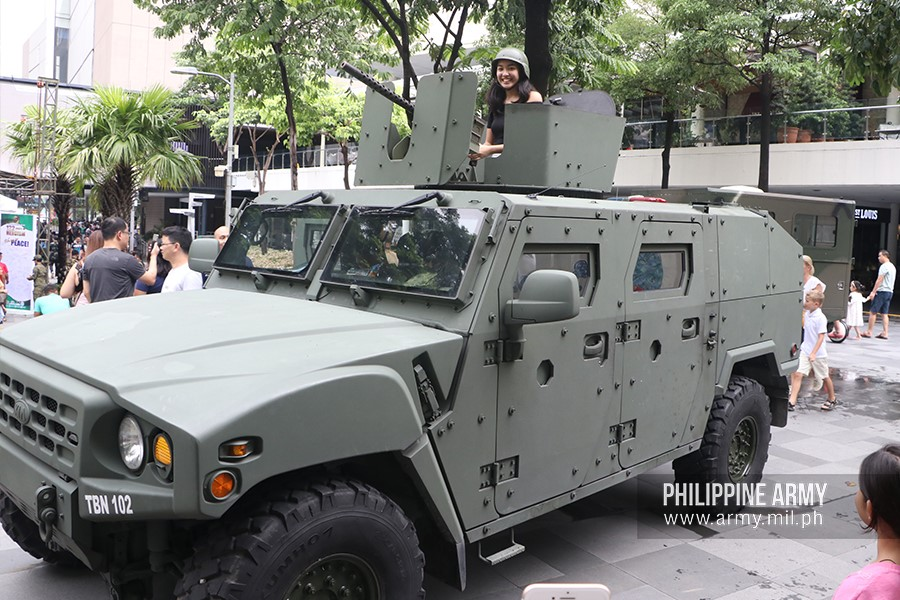
K153 Armored reconnaissance vehicle of the Philippine Army at a public display in 2019.

=== Current operators ===
- Chile – 20 units acquired, KLTV181 version acquired in December 2022 for the Chilean Marine Corps.
- Malaysia - 17 units for Malaysian Army.
- Mali – Malian military began receiving Kia KLTVs in 2017 for use by FORSAT forces.
- Nigeria – Nigerian army began receiving Kia KLTVs in 2020. At least one KLTV was spotted brand new with the factory sticker on the windscreen.
- Peru – 10 units were built and subsequently delivered to the army. Production of more units is expected; it is believed that they could manufacture around 200 to 300 units by 2026.
- Philippines
  - Philippine Army- 3 units delivered in 2018.
  - Philippine Marine Corps - 1 unit delivered in 2018.
  - Philippine Air Force - 9 units of K152 Raycolt delivered in 2026.
- Poland – 400 ordered for Polish Land Forces, 1 ordered for Polish Border Guard. To be assembled in Poland as Legwan.
- South Korea – KLTV began entering service in 2016.
- Turkmenistan – State Border Service of Turkmenistan operates at least dozen KLTV.

=== Non-State Actors ===
- ISIL – One of the KLTVs shipped to the Nigerian Army was captured by Islamic State - West Africa Province in December 2020.
