= K17 =

K17 may refer to:

- K-17 (Kansas highway), former
- HMS K17, a K-class submarine of the Royal Navy
- Kaman K-17, an American experimental helicopter
- Keratin 17
- Symphony No. 2 (Mozart), once attributed to Wolfgang Amadeus Mozart
