= Bangtan Helmet =

South Korean combat helmet

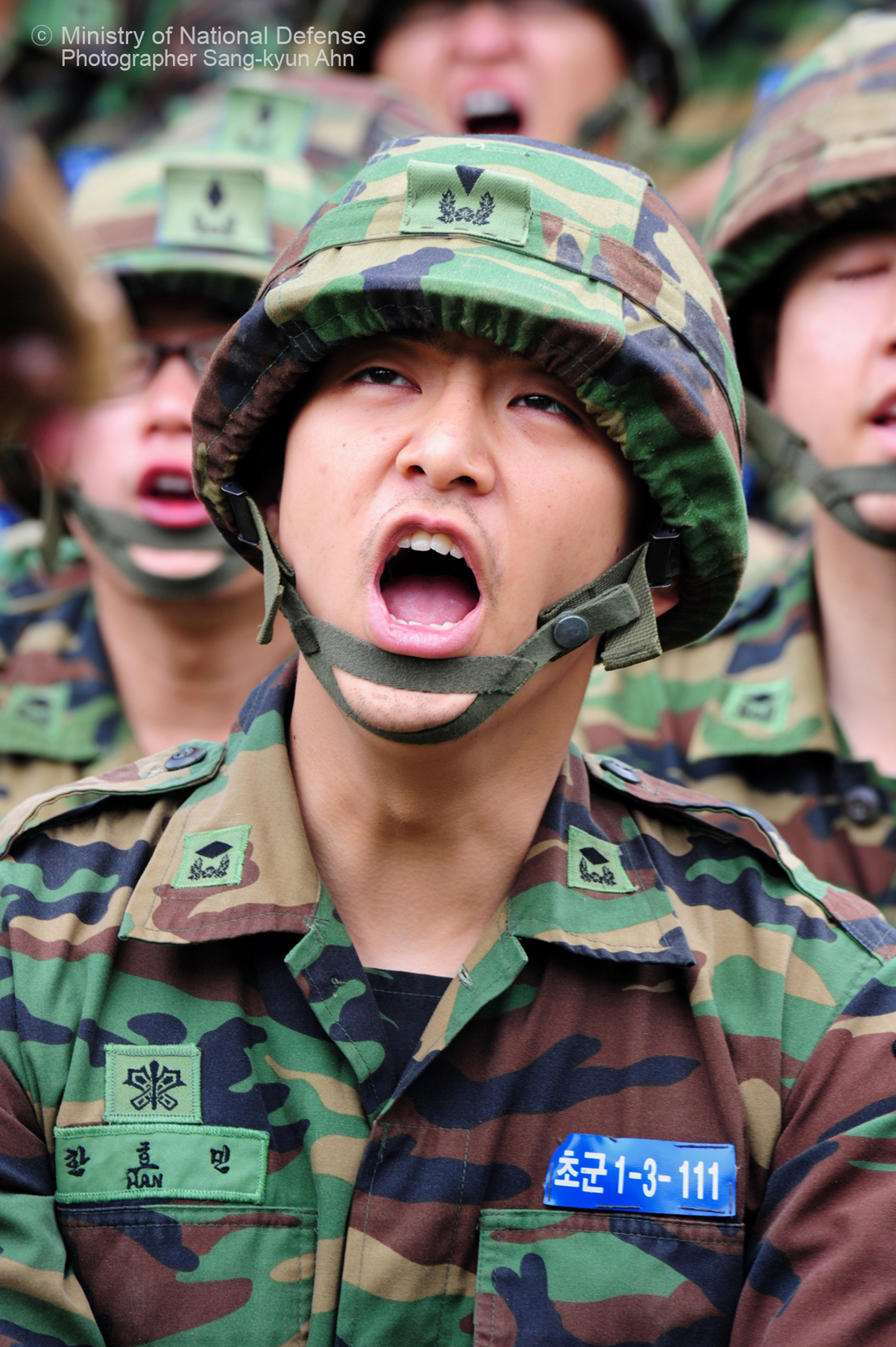
- South Korean soldier wearing Bangtan helmet
- Type: Combat helmet
- Place of origin: South Korea

Service history
- In service: 1971–present
- Used by: See Users
- Wars: Iran–Iraq War; Persian Gulf War; War in Afghanistan; Iraq War

Production history
- Designer: Han Pil-sun
- Designed: 1971
- Manufacturer: Oriental Industry; Silver Star Company Farhat Trading Company (copy); H.H. Didizian (copy)
- Variants: M80, M90

Specifications
- Weight: 950 g

The Bangtan Helmet (Korean: 방탄 헬멧; Bangtan is Korean for "anti-ballistic" or "bulletproof") is a combat helmet developed by South Korea in 1971. Despite the name, the helmet was not designed to withstand against direct hitting bullets but to protect against heavy objects and bomb shrapnel–a standard for 1970s military world wide; though, it was one of the earliest military helmets that applied non-metal composite material to reduce the weight while increasing the protection. The name was given as a commemorate for being superior than the M1 helmet. The helmet configuration is based on the latest version of the M1.

Since the introduction of the New Type Bangtan Helmet (신형 방탄 헬멧), later known as KH-B2000, in 2003, the name gradually changed to Old Type Bangtan Helmet (구형 방탄 헬멧), and the helmet is phasing out from active service since 2004. There is no official model number given to the helmet, but the Ministry of Defense sometimes calls it a "nylon helmet", named after a material of the helmet.

The helmet is also known as the M76 by collectors.

== Development ==
In March 1971, an officer from the Joint Chiefs of Staff delivered an envelope marked with "emergency" to Dr. Han Pil-sun (한필순), one of the engineers of the Agency for Defense Development. When Dr. Han opened the envelope, there was a three-page pamphlet about the Orlite Israeli bulletproof helmet delivered from a military attaché in Israel. The helmet was tested by American weapons experiment company HP White Laboratory, and it was proven as equally protective as an American M1 helmet.

"If Israel can, so can we", Dr. Han believed, and borrowed 200 thousand KRW, which was five times his monthly wage, from his wife for his personal project that was not requested nor funded by the government. His team analyzed the pamphlet and related documents, and found that nylon was used as bulletproof material. Then Kim Eun-yeong (김은영), the head of chemical research department of KIST taught them adhesive materials and nylon processing techniques.

In early June, during the 1000th protection test–dropping 10 kg iron object with bullet-sized pointy end on the helmet from 1.3 m height–the team found that 7 layers of thick nylon and synthetic resin, which are compressed to remove air and extra liquid state synthetic resin, then solidified by heat treatment, has equal protection compared to M1 helmet while 8 layers provides better protection. Since Dr. Han lacked funding, he made a prototype with only 3 layers. When Song Heung-bin (송흥빈), the Director of Defense Industry of the Ministry of Defense, who had a huge influence in decision making of the budget, visited the ADD, he directed tests such as hitting the helmet with a sledgehammer and running over the helmet with a military Jeep and a 2½ ton military truck; the helmet survived without damage.

Upon hearing the news, O Won-cheol (오원철), the Second Senior Secretary for Economic Affairs, summoned Dr. Han to bring a sledgehammer and the helmet to the Blue House, which the sledgehammer caused trouble for Dr. Han during the security check. At the Blue House, O called a bulky security service and gave him the sledgehammer to slam the helmet with full strength, which made a dent on the helmet that even truck failed to do. Dr. Han initially thought he failed, but the helmet recovered its original shape after 1 minute. Impressed by the test, O authorized the budget to produce 300 samples.

The helmet was named Bangtan Helmet after easily passing the U.S. standard test. The Secretary O again tested the 8 layer helmet with military Jeep and sledgehammer; this time the helmet survived impact, and received a scratch on the paint. The technology was transferred to Oriental Industries (plastic manufacturer) and Silstar (fish rod manufacturer). And soon began the mass production.

The helmet had other advantages such as lesser weight (0.9 kg) compared to M1 (1.5 kg), heat resistance in summer and cold resistance in winter, and roomy inner space. Despite the helmet was originally prioritized for the Republic of Korea Reserve Forces, Korean senior officers began wearing the helmet, and the usage was expanded to American senior officers in Korea. Later, the commander of the USFK sent a box of Bangtan Helmet to the United States for research purpose. The helmet became the standard combat helmet of the Republic of Korea Armed Forces in 1976.

== Service history ==
=== South Korea ===
First introduced into service with the Republic of Korea Reserve Forces in 1971 and the Republic of Korea Armed Forces in 1976, the Bangtan Helmet has been used in every war South Korea has participated in, including the Gulf War, early phases of the War in Afghanistan and the Iraq War.

=== Iraq ===
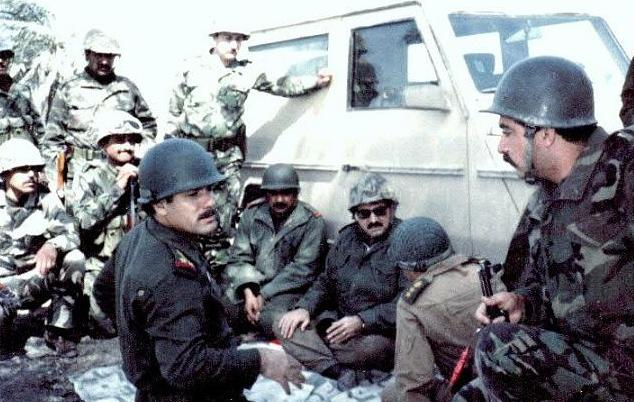
Iraqi officers during Operation Al-Fajr-8, 1986. All wearing Bangtan Helmets

South Korea supplied millions of Bangtan Helmet to Iraq since late 1970s. These exported Bangtan Helmets are commonly known as the M80 by collectors. According to source, Type 1 is the only Korean produced original while copies were made by Farhat Trading Company in Jordan (Type 2) and H.H. Didizian in the United Arab Emirates (Type 3~7). (Note: The source wrongly claimed H.H. Didizian as a South Korean company since no such company existed. According to available sources, the company is located in the United Arab Emirates.) Before the 1980s, the Iraqi Armed Forces had used various steel helmets which were mostly of Soviet origin. These included Soviet SSH40 and SSH68 helmets and Polish M50 patterns. During the early 1980s the M80 helmet began to replace these patterns. They were used in the Iran–Iraq War, the Persian Gulf War, and the Iraq War.

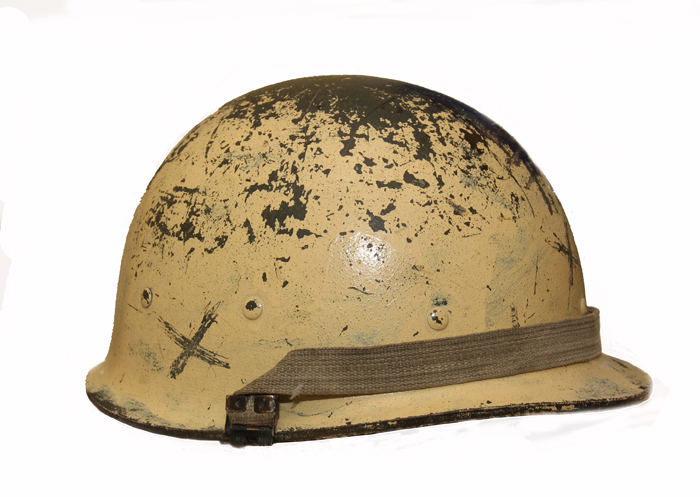
An unknown type of Iraqi M80 Helmet

In 1990 an Iraqi-made version of this helmet, the M90, which is usually fitted with a distinctive rubber rim, appeared which was of inferior quality construction. These later helmets are prone to splitting at the edges and have a protective rubber rim. The post 1990 helmets were supplied in desert tan colour only. Both types of helmet can be found with a variety of Arabic and military unit markings, and are sometimes painted white with red markings for the Iraqi Military Police. Iraqi helmets were abandoned in large numbers on the battlefields of Iraq and Kuwait and proved to be popular souvenirs with western soldiers returning home from the Persian Gulf. Both types of helmet are still in limited service with the Iraqi Security Forces, but are being replaced by the American PASGT helmet.

== Gallery ==
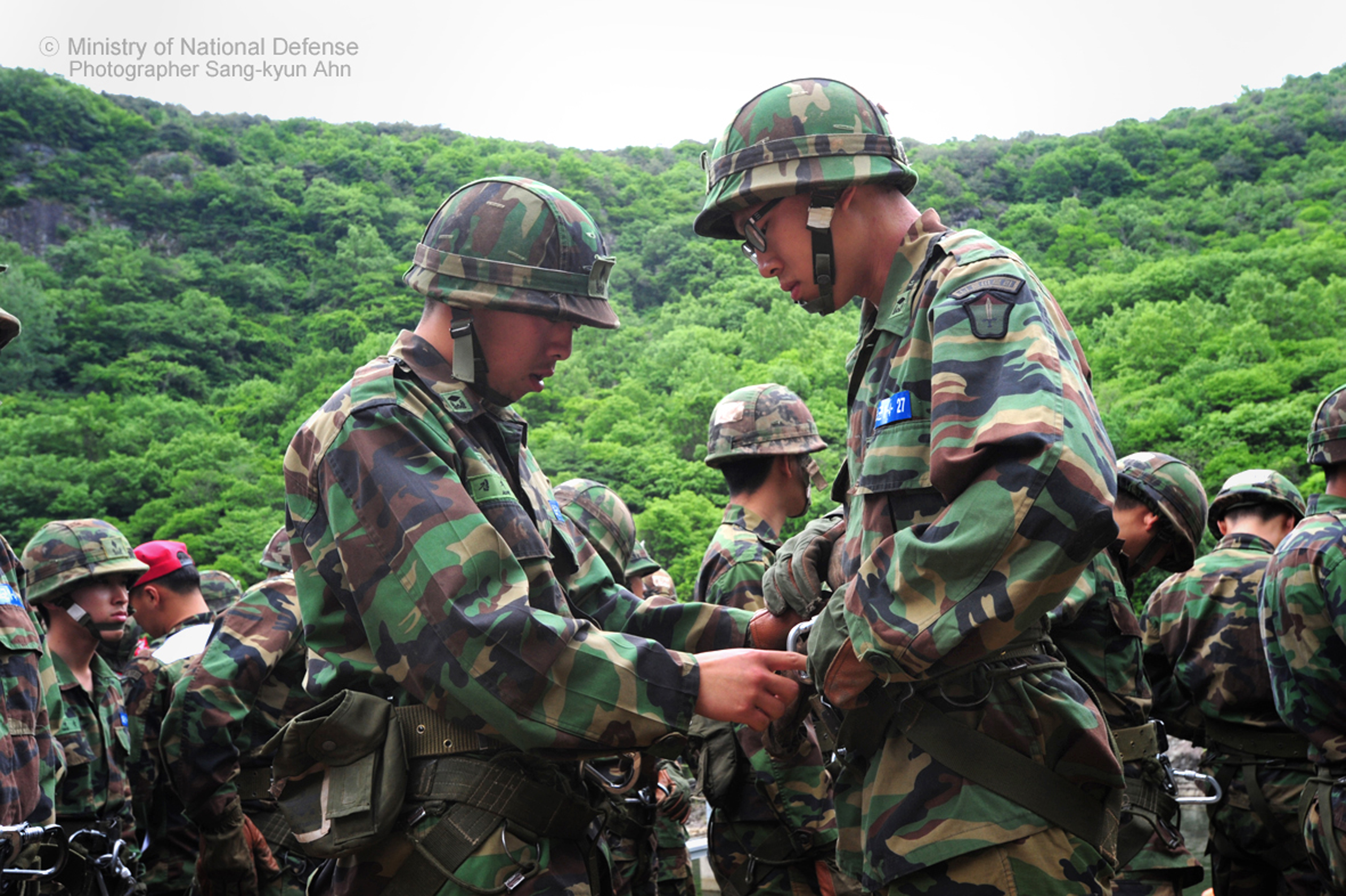
South Korean soldiers (then) wearing Bangtan combat helmet.

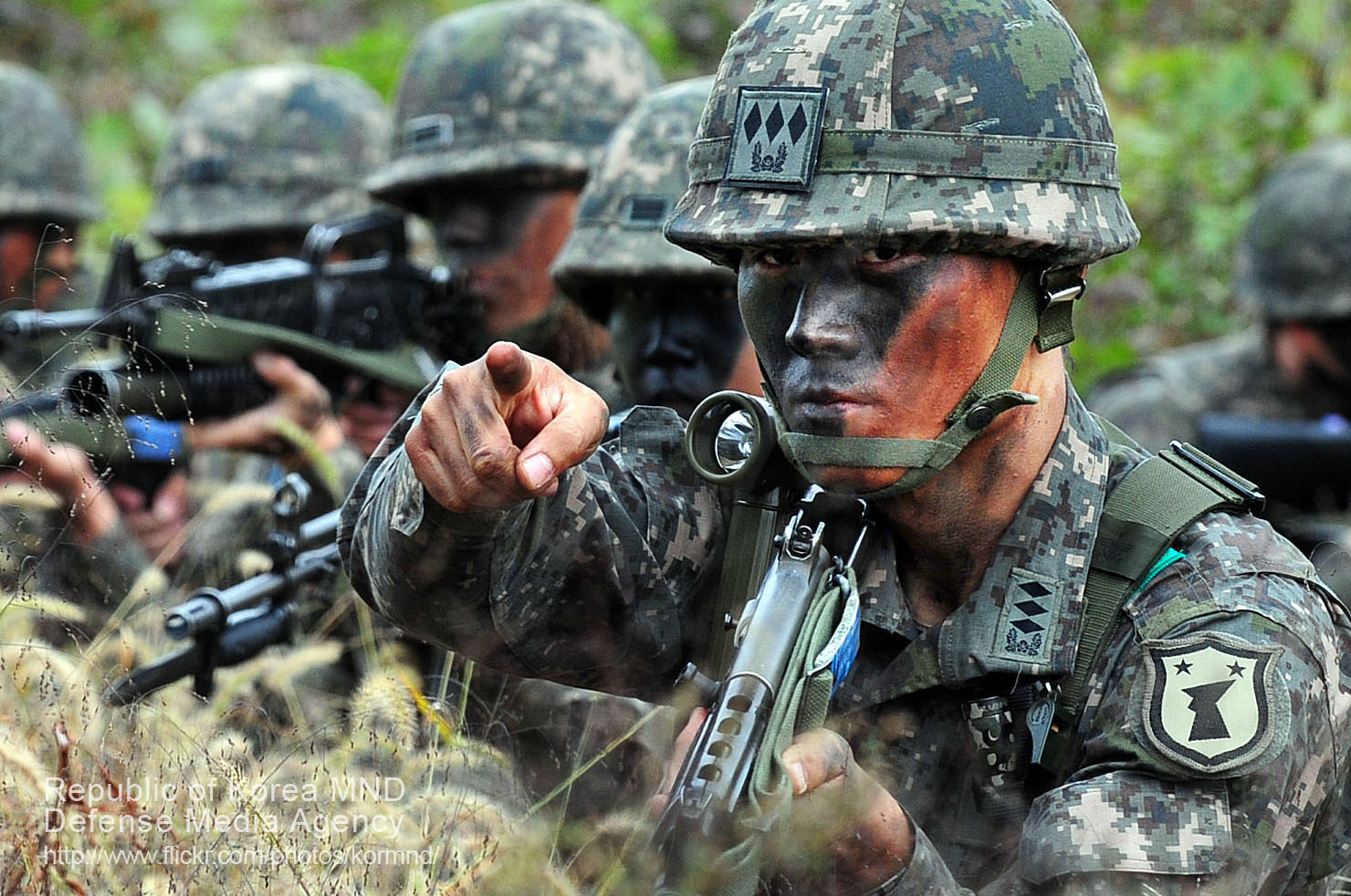
South Korean soldiers (now) wearing Bangtan combat helmet during live-fire exercise

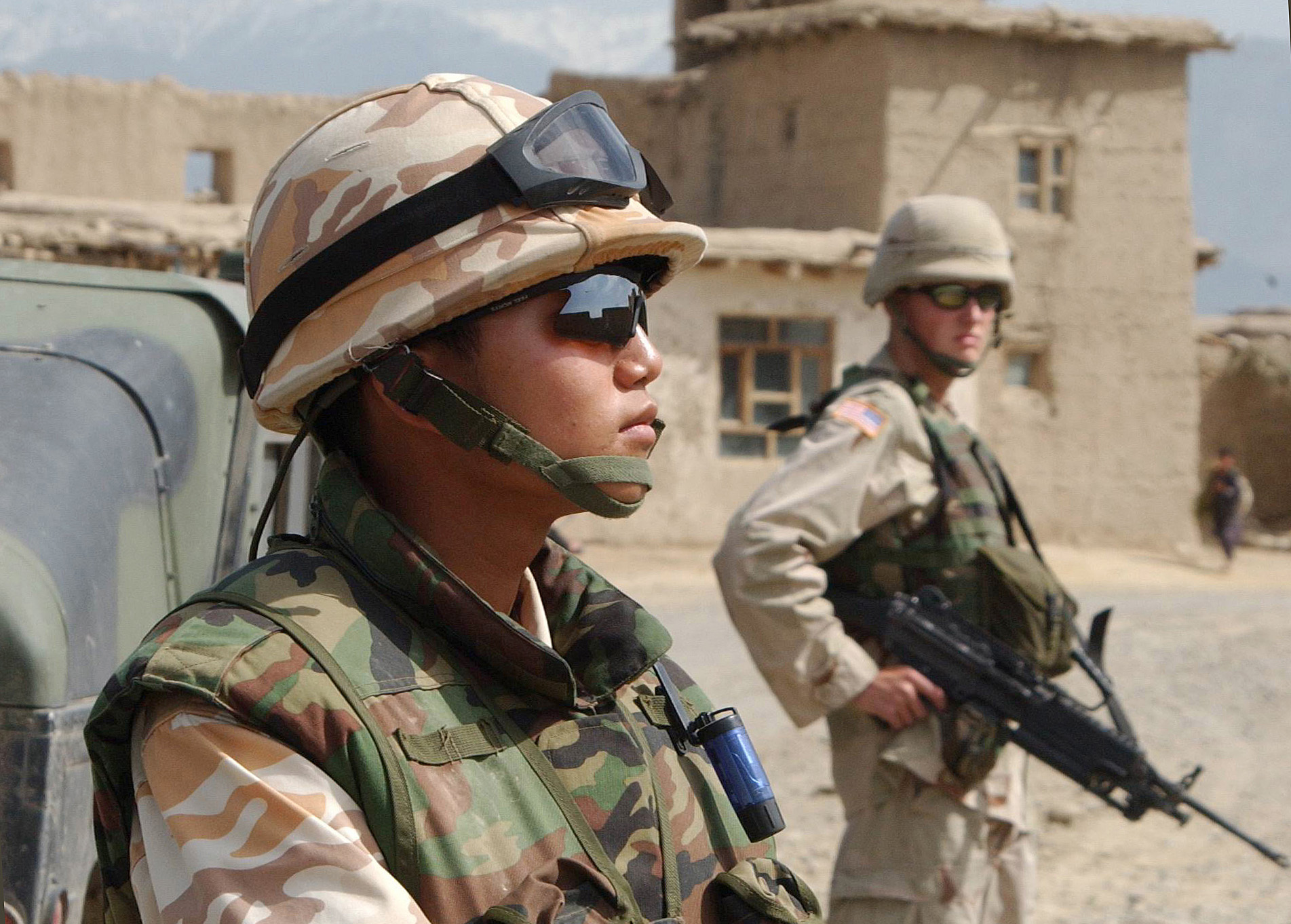
South Korean soldier in overseas wearing Bangtan Helmet

== Users ==
- Chile
- Hong Kong: Produced copy for export.
- Indonesia
- Iraq: Uses the original and copies.
- Jordan: Produced copy.
- Lebanon
- Malaysia: Produced copy from 1980s until 1990s.
- Mexico
- Singapore
- Republic of Korea: Supplied to the Reserve Forces since 1971. Became the standard helmet of the Armed Forces in 1976. Replacement began in 2004 with the KH-B2000, and it is still ongoing with newer models. Currently in use by non-combat units.
- United Arab Emirates: Produced copy.
- United States: Limited service in the USFK.
- Uruguay
- Venezuela

== See also ==
- M1 helmet - Basis for Bangtan Helmet
- OR-201 (A similar helmet that inspired the Bangtan)
