= Dyneema Composite Fabric =

Non-woven fabric

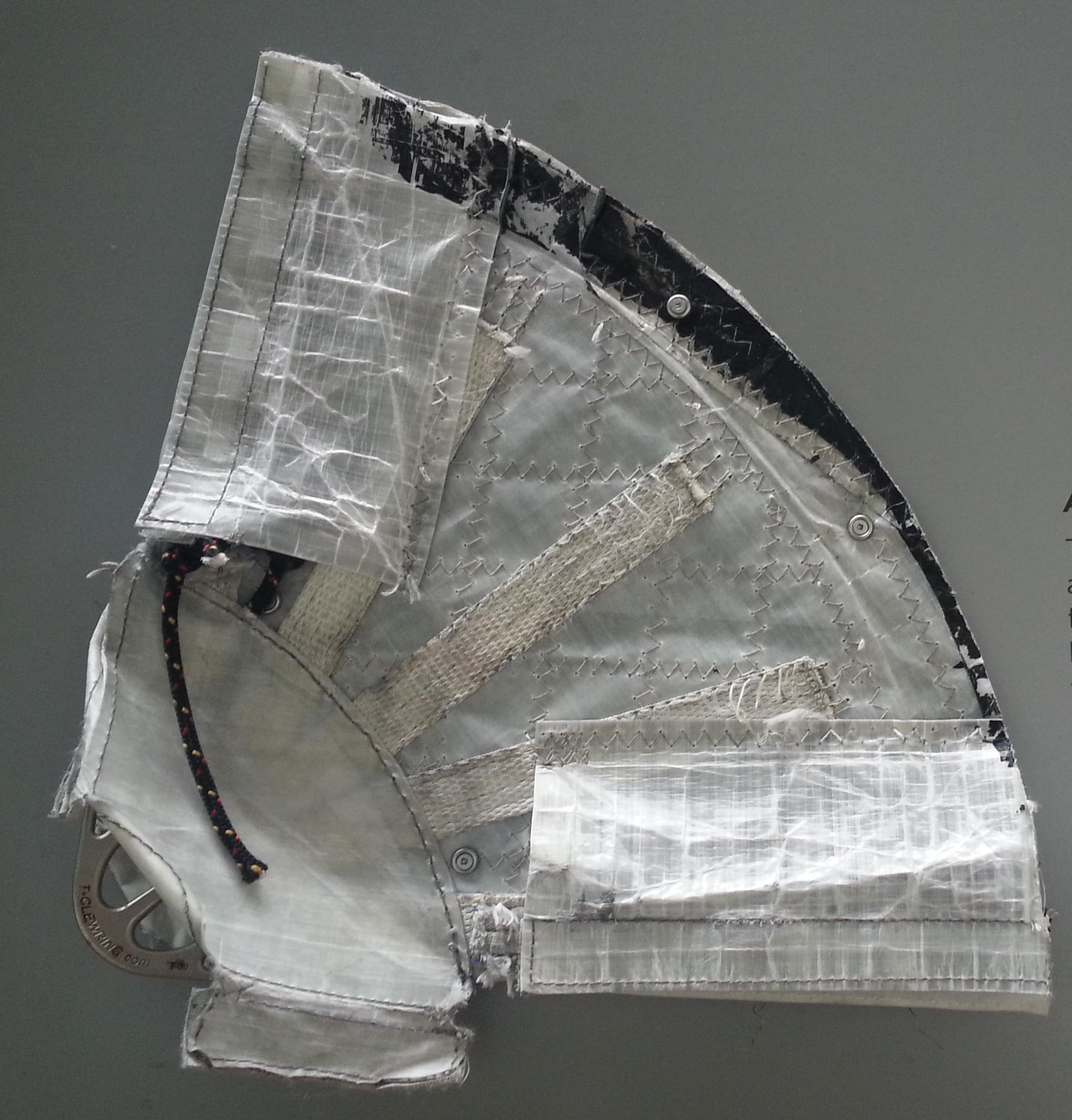
The clew (lower rear corner) of the gennaker sail of an AC45 class racing catamaran, made of Cuben Fiber with nylon strips

Dyneema Composite Fabric (DCF), also known as Cuben Fiber (CTF3), is a high-performance non-woven composite material used in high-strength, low-weight applications. It is constructed from a thin sheet of ultra-high-molecular-weight polyethylene (UHMWPE, "Dyneema") laminated between two sheets of polyester.

It is used in various applications that call for a fabric with high tensile strength, but where low weight is desirable, such as sails and ultralight backpacking equipment.

The material was developed by the Cuben Fiber and Cubic Tech Corporations in the 1990s. In 2015, Cubic Tech was acquired by DSM, their supplier for the UHMWPE fiber. The product was subsequently renamed "Dyneema Composite Fabric" ("DCF"), a generic brand name DSM uses for all of their composite products which incorporate UHMWPE.

== History ==
The name Cuben Fiber was coined by the press in reference to America³ (pronounced America Cubed), the winner of the 1992 America's Cup. During the 1992 Cup, that yacht reportedly used sails made from precursors to the currently available commercial product. In late 2007, the Cuben Fiber Corporation was acquired by North Sails. North Sails said they would continue to supply the materials to competitors when available. Cubic Tech Corporation has the exclusive rights to develop and sell "Cuben Fiber" laminates for all non-sailing applications. On 13 May 2015, a news release from Heerlen, Netherlands announced that Cubic Tech Corporation had been bought out by Dyneema, a subsidiary of DSM, officially known as Koninklijke Dsm Nv. Additional details about the buyout and the future of Cubic Tech Corp were revealed in an online Q&A with DSM. On 20 April 2022, a news release from Avient Corporation announced that they were purchasing the DSM Protective Materials business (including the Dyneema® brand).

== Production ==
Dyneema Composite Fabric is a laminated fabric constructed from ultra high molecular weight polyethylene (UHMWPE) fiber monofilaments and polyester, polyvinyl fluoride, etc. films. Cuben fiber is sometimes confused with carbon fiber, one of the many fibers used as a reinforcement in some Cuben Fiber laminates. Cubic Tech Corporation's ultra-high performance flexible laminates were re-branded from Cuben Fiber to CTF3 in 2009. Cubic Tech Corp produces CTF3 with a wide variety of fibers such as Vectran, carbon, Kevlar, etc. In August 2013 it was announced that Cubic Tech Corp. had produced a version of their waterproof breathable fabric which utilizes the GE eVent fabric.

== Application ==
The material is used in yachting, performance sailing, windsurfing, inflatables, airship hulls, medical applications and increasingly in ultralight backpacking equipment, such as tents and backpacks. It is also used to make wallets. Similar to sails made from traditional woven sail cloth, Dyneema Composite Fabric sails are constructed from panels that are bonded and sewn together, as opposed to three-dimensional laminated (3DL) sails that are laminated over a mold. The material is reportedly more durable than laminated sails of comparable strength while being lighter in weight. UHMWPE has excellent resistance to ultraviolet light and is less prone to disintegrate from repeated flexing than either Kevlar or carbon fiber.

== See also ==
- Silnylon
