= PRC-999K =

Combat Net Radio (CNR) currently used by South Korea Army

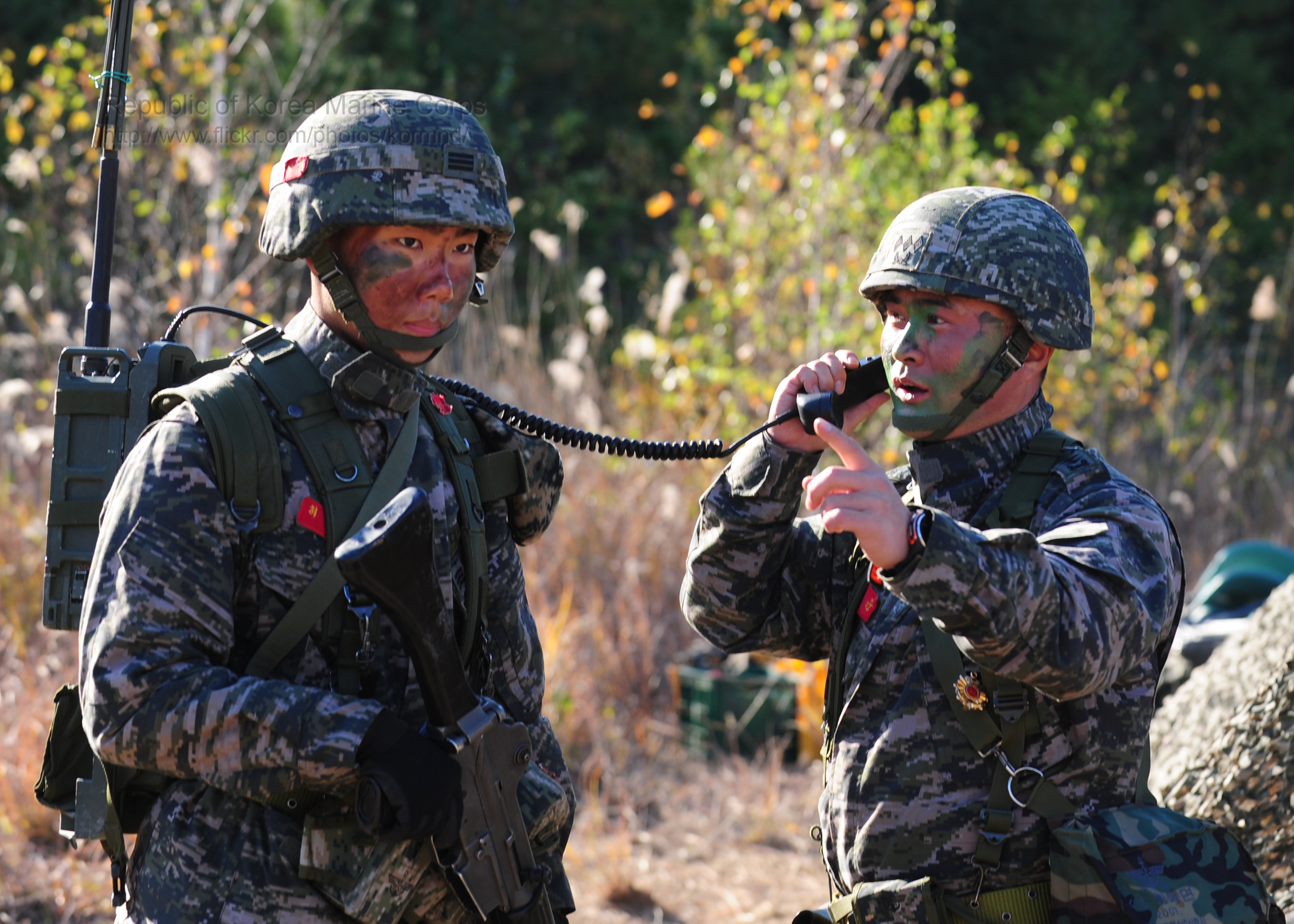
Network configuration training of Rep. of Korea Marine Corps 1st Division

The PRC-999K is a portable radio transceiver of the Republic of Korea Army. It is usually used by Companies & Battalions. It is developed and built by LIG Nex1. Formally, PRC-999K is the name of all equipment in the portable transceiver set. This set costs almost 8 million won (US$ 7,077.18) and weighs around 15 kg (using a Nickel–cadmium battery). The PRC-999K (RT-314K) variant is loaded with Electronic counter-countermeasure Modules.

The PRC-999K uses an FM/VHF Band. It uses data or voice transmission via settle frequency or CDMA (Hopping). Its frequency is over the civil radio FM band, so it is possible that jamming or being heard on civilian radios can occur. It has an output of 5, 10, or 20W.

In addition, the PRC-999K is capable of accessing other communication networks and intercepting transmissions, and can also be used to operate radio from a distance using remote functions. A light sensor is attached to the radio, which automatically adjusts the brightness of the liquid on the radio screen. In addition to a radio self-inspection function, the ECCM module for electronic warfare is also equipped, and the radio can be adjusted remotely by using a controller and cable. The PRC-999K also comes with an erasing function to remove all information from the radio.

== Additional parts ==
- Remote Control to PRC-999K (Using wire)
- Random Number injector (Military secret II level product)
