= Ultra-high-molecular-weight polyethylene =

Very long-chain polyethylene with high impact strength

Ultra-high-molecular-weight polyethylene (UHMWPE, UHMW) is a subset of the thermoplastic polyethylene. Also known as high-modulus polyethylene (HMPE), it has extremely long chains, with a molecular mass typically between 2 and 6 million daltons. The longer chain serves to transfer load more effectively to the polymer backbone by strengthening intermolecular interactions. This results in a very tough material, with the highest impact strength of any thermoplastic presently made.

UHMWPE is odorless, tasteless, and nontoxic. It embodies all the characteristics of high-density polyethylene (HDPE), i.e., being resistant to acids, alkalis, and many corrosive chemicals except some oxidizing acids. It has extremely low moisture absorption and a very low coefficient of friction; is self-lubricating (see boundary lubrication); and is highly resistant to abrasion. Its coefficient of friction is significantly lower than that of nylon and acetal and is comparable to that of polytetrafluoroethylene (PTFE, Teflon), but UHMWPE has better abrasion resistance than PTFE.

== Development ==
Polymerization of UHMWPE was commercialized in the 1950s by Ruhrchemie AG, which has changed names over the years. Today UHMWPE powder materials, which may be directly molded into a product's final shape, are produced by Braskem, Teijin (Endumax), Celanese, and Mitsui. Processed UHMWPE is available commercially either as fibers or in consolidated form, such as sheets or rods. Because of its resistance to wear and impact, UHMWPE continues to find increasing industrial applications, including the automotive and bottling sectors. Since the 1960s, UHMWPE has also been the material of choice for total joint arthroplasty in orthopedic and spine implants.

UHMWPE fibers branded as Dyneema, commercialized in the late 1970s by the Dutch chemical company DSM, and as Spectra, commercialized by Honeywell (then AlliedSignal), are widely used in ballistic protection, defense applications, and increasingly in medical devices, protective motorcycling gear, sailing, hiking equipment, climbing, and many other industries.

== Structure and properties ==
Structure of UHMWPE, with n greater than 100,000

UHMWPE is a type of polyethylene. It is made up of extremely long chains of polyethylene, which all align in the same direction. It derives its strength largely from the length of each individual molecule (chain). Van der Waals forces between the molecules are relatively weak for each atom of overlap between the molecules, but because the molecules are very long, large overlaps can exist, adding up to the ability to carry larger shear forces from molecule to molecule.

When formed into fibers, the polymer chains can attain a parallel orientation greater than 95% and a level of crystallinity from 39% to 75%. In contrast, aramid derives its strength from strong bonding between relatively short molecules.

Its heat resistance is poorer than other high-strength fibers. Its melting point onset is 127.7 °C (261.9 °F), and, according to DSM, it is not advisable to use UHMWPE fibres at temperatures exceeding 90 °C (194 °F) for long periods of time. It becomes brittle at temperatures below −150 °C (−238 °F).

The simple structure of the molecule also gives rise to surface and chemical properties that are rare in high-performance polymers. For example, the polar groups in most polymers easily bond to water. Because olefins have no such groups, UHMWPE does not absorb water readily, nor does it wet easily, which makes bonding it to other polymers difficult. For the same reasons, skin does not interact with it strongly, making the UHMWPE fiber surface feel slippery. In a similar manner, aromatic polymers are often susceptible to aromatic solvents due to aromatic stacking interactions, an effect aliphatic polymers like UHMWPE are immune to. Since UHMWPE does not contain chemical groups (such as esters, amides, or hydroxylic groups) that are susceptible to attack from aggressive agents, it is very resistant to water, moisture, most chemicals, UV radiation, and micro-organisms.

Under tensile load, UHMWPE will deform continually as long as the stress is present—an effect called creep.

When UHMWPE is annealed, the material is heated to between 135 and 138 °C (275 and 280 °F) in an oven or a liquid bath of silicone oil or glycerine. The material is then cooled down to 65 °C (149 °F) at a rate of 5 °C/h (9 °F/h) or less. Finally, the material is wrapped in an insulating blanket for 24 hours to bring to room temperature.

UHMWPE is considered a relatively low-modulus material, with tensile strength and hardness values lower than those of many other high-performance polymers. Typical tensile yield strength values range from 19.3 to 23 MPa (2,800 to 3,340 psi). The Shore D hardness is approximately 60 to 65, which is slightly lower than that of high-density polyethylene (HDPE). Despite its lower modulus, the extremely long polymer chains and high molecular weight give UHMWPE exceptional toughness and impact resistance.

UHMWPE exhibits the highest impact strength of any thermoplastic, and in standard notched Izod tests specimens often do not break (values > 1,070 J/m (240 ft⋅lb/ft)). Its elongation at break can reach 250%–450%, and its lower chain-packing efficiency gives a density of about 0.93–0.94 g/cm^{3} (0.54–0.54 oz/cu in), a little lower than that of HDPE.

== Production ==
UHMWPE is produced by polymerization of ethylene. Many kinds of polyethylene can be prepared but the UHMW variety requires very active catalysts and high pressures of ethylene. Catalysis is effected by coordination polymerization, which involves metallocene (Kaminsky catalysts) or Ziegler-Natta catalysts.

The resulting UHMWPE molecules typically have 100,000 to 250,000 monomer units per molecule each compared to HDPE's 700 to 1,800 monomers.

UHMWPE is processed variously by compression moulding, ram extrusion, gel spinning, and sintering. Several European companies began compression molding UHMWPE in the early 1960s. Gel-spinning arrived much later and was intended for different applications. The two major producers of UHMWPE yarns via gel spinning are Honeywell and DSM. There are also several Chinese based manufacturers for UHMWPE yarn.

There are two major routes for gel spinning UHMWPE. In both routes, a precisely heated gel is created. In one route the gel is made from a mixture of UHMWPE powder and oil. In the other route, the powder is mixed with decalin. Both routes use very low concentrations of UHMWPE in the suspension (~5%).

The suspension is extruded through a spinneret. The extrudate is drawn through the air.

In the case where decalin is used, the decalin is left to evaporate from the yarn. When producing at industrial levels, this decalin can be recovered and recycled.

When oil is used to suspend UHMWPE, the oil extracted with a solvent (typically hexane or dichloromethane which does not affect the UHMWPE, and then dried removing the solvent. Again at large scales these hazardous solvents can be captured.

It has been reported that for every kilogram of UHMWPE yarn that is manufactured, 20 kg (44 lb) of oil is required. Furthermore, the removal of this oil requires between 100–200 kg (220–440 lb) of hexane.

Following the decalin or oil removal process, the partially orientated yarn is transported through heated ovens to draw the yarn. At industrial scale, these ovens can be over 200 metres (660 ft) long. This aligns the crystal structure of the UHMWPE and enables the yarn to reach very high tensile strengths.

The end-result is a fiber with a high degree of molecular orientation, and therefore exceptional tensile strength. Gel spinning depends on isolating individual chain molecules in the solvent so that intermolecular entanglements are minimal. Entanglements make chain orientation more difficult, and lower the strength of the final product.

Recently, an alternative route for manufacturing UHMWPE yarn has been developed utilising supercritical carbon dioxide. This new route has been shown to be much more environmentally friendly than the conventional route. Specifically, the use of carbon dioxide as a solvent has been reported to reduce the carbon footprint of the manufacturing route by more than 50%. The use of supercritical carbon dioxide as a solvent enables the mineral oil to be recovered from the partially oriented yarn and recycled. Additionally, it eliminates the need for any hexane, dichloromethane or decalin use within the manufacturing process.

The company behind this new development (Fibre Extrusion Technology Ltd.) recently won a TechTextil 2026 Innovation Award for new technology.

== Applications ==
=== Fiber ===
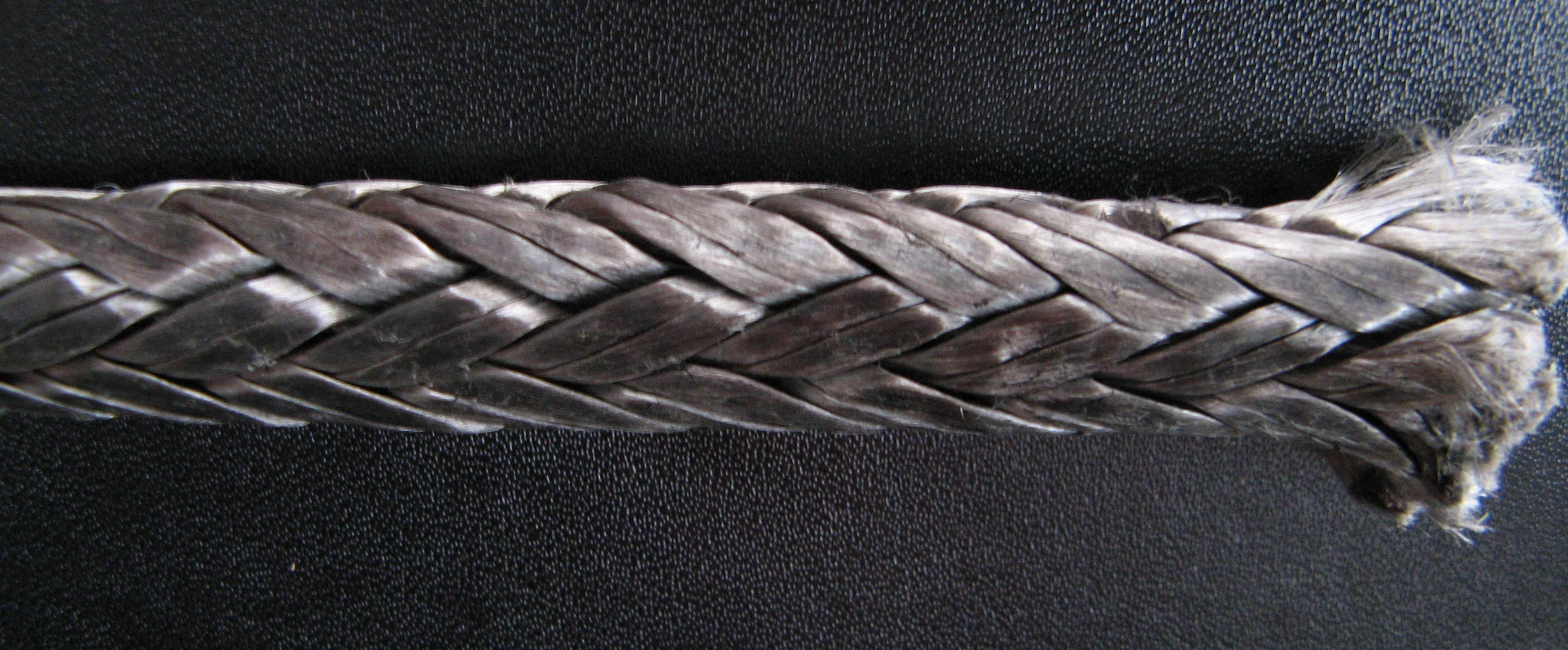
LIROS Dyneema hollow

Dyneema, Spectra, and Cortex are brands of lightweight high-strength oriented-strand gels spun through a spinneret. They have yield strengths as high as 2.4 GPa (350,000 psi) and density as low as 0.97 g/cm^{3} (0.56 oz/cu in) (for Dyneema SK75). High-strength steels have comparable yield strengths, and low-carbon steels have yield strengths much lower (around 0.5 GPa (73,000 psi)). Since steel has a specific gravity of roughly 7.8, these materials have strength-to-weight ratios eight times those of high-strength steels. Strength-to-weight ratios for UHMWPE are about 40% higher than for aramid. The high qualities of UHMWPE filament were discovered by Albert Pennings in 1968, but commercially viable products were made available by DSM in 1990 and Southern Ropes soon after.

Derivatives of UHMWPE yarn are used in composite plates in armor, in particular, personal armor and on occasion as vehicle armor. Civil applications containing UHMWPE fibers are cut-resistant gloves, tear-resistant pantyhose, bow strings, climbing equipment, automotive winching, fishing line, spear lines for spearguns, high-performance sails, suspension lines on sport parachutes and paragliders, rigging in yachting, kites, and kite lines for kite sports.

For personal armor, the fibers are, in general, aligned and bonded into sheets, which are then layered at various angles to give the resulting composite material strength in all directions. Recently developed additions to the US military's Interceptor body armor, designed to offer arm and leg protection, are said to utilize a form of UHMWPE fabric. A multitude of UHMWPE woven fabrics are available in the market and are used as shoe liners, pantyhose, fencing clothing, stab-resistant vests, and composite liners for vehicles.

The use of UHMWPE rope for automotive winching offers several advantages over the more common steel wire rope. The key reason for changing to UHMWPE rope is improved safety. The lower mass of UHMWPE rope, coupled with significantly lower elongation at breaking, carries far less energy than steel or nylon, which leads to almost no snap-back. UHMWPE rope does not develop kinks that can cause weak spots, and any frayed areas that may develop along the surface of the rope cannot pierce the skin like broken steel wire strands can. UHMWPE rope is less dense than water, making water recoveries easier as the recovery cable is easier to locate than wire rope. The bright colours available also aid with visibility should the rope become submerged or dirty. Another advantage in automotive applications is the reduced weight of UHMWPE rope over steel cables. A typical 11 mm (0.43 in) UHMWPE rope of 30 m (98 ft) can weigh around 2 kg (4.4 lb), the equivalent steel wire rope would weigh around 13 kg (29 lb). One notable drawback of UHMWPE rope is its susceptibility to UV damage, so many users will fit winch covers in order to protect the cable when not in use. It is also vulnerable to heat damage from contact with hot components.

Spun UHMWPE fibers excel as fishing line, as they have less stretch, are more abrasion-resistant, and are thinner than the equivalent monofilament line.

In climbing, cord and webbing made of combinations of UHMWPE and nylon yarn have gained popularity for their low weight and bulk. They exhibit very low elasticity compared to their nylon counterparts, which translates to low toughness. The fiber's very high lubricity causes poor knot-holding ability, and it is mostly used in pre-sewn 'slings' (loops of webbing)—relying on knots to join sections of UHMWPE is generally not recommended, and if necessary it is recommended to use the triple fisherman's knot rather than the traditional double fisherman's knot.

Ships' hawsers and cables made from the fiber (0.97 specific gravity) float on sea water. "Spectra wires" as they are called in the towing boat community are commonly used for face wires as a lighter alternative to steel wires.

It is used in skis and snowboards, often in combination with carbon fiber, reinforcing the fiberglass composite material, adding stiffness and improving its flex characteristics. The UHMWPE is often used as the base layer, which contacts the snow, and includes abrasives to absorb and retain wax.

It is also used in lifting applications, for manufacturing low weight, and heavy duty lifting slings. Due to its extreme abrasion resistance it is also used as an excellent corner protection for synthetic lifting slings.

High-performance lines (such as backstays) for sailing and parasailing are made of UHMWPE, due to their low stretch, high strength, and low weight. Similarly, UHMWPE is often used for winch-launching gliders from the ground, as, in comparison with steel cable, its superior abrasion resistance results in less wear when running along the ground and into the winch, increasing the time between failures. The lower weight on the mile-long cables used also results in higher winch launches.

UHMWPE was used for the 30 km (19 mi) long, 0.6 mm (0.024 in) thick space tether in the ESA/Russian Young Engineers' Satellite 2 of September, 2007.

Dyneema composite fabric (DCF) is a laminated material consisting of a grid of Dyneema threads sandwiched between two thin transparent polyester membranes. This material is very strong for its weight, and was originally developed for use in racing yacht sails under the name 'Cuben Fiber'. More recently it has found new applications, most notably in the manufacture of lightweight and ultralight camping and backpacking equipment such as tents, backpacks, and bear-proof food bags.

In archery, UHMWPE is widely used as a material for bowstrings because of its low creep and stretch compared to, for example, Dacron (PET). Besides pure UHMWPE fibers, most manufacturers use blends to further reduce the creep and stretch of the material. In these blends, the UHMWPE fibers are blended with, for example, Vectran.

In skydiving, UHMWPE is one of the most common materials used for suspension lines, largely supplanting the earlier-used Dacron, being lighter and less bulky. UHMWPE has excellent strength and wear-resistance, but is not dimensionally stable (i.e. shrinks) when exposed to heat, which leads to gradual and uneven shrinkage of different lines as they are subject to differing amounts of friction during canopy deployment, necessitating periodic line replacement. It is also almost completely inelastic, which can exacerbate the opening shock. For that reason, Dacron lines continue to be used in student and some tandem systems, where the added bulk is less of a concern than the potential for an injurious opening. In turn, in high-performance parachutes used for swooping, UHMWPE is replaced with Vectran and HMA (high-modulus aramid), which are even thinner and dimensionally stable, but exhibit greater wear and require much more frequent maintenance to prevent catastrophic failure. UHMWPE are also used for reserve parachute closing loops when used with automatic activation devices, where their extremely low coefficient of friction is critical for proper operation in the event of cutter activation.

=== Medical ===
UHMWPE has a clinical history as a biomaterial for use in hip, knee, and (since the 1980s), for spine implants. An online repository of information and review articles related to medical grade UHMWPE, known as the UHMWPE Lexicon, was started online in 2000.

Joint replacement components have historically been made from "GUR" resins. These powder materials are produced by Ticona, typically converted into semi-forms by companies such as Quadrant and Orthoplastics, and then machined into implant components and sterilized by device manufacturers.

UHMWPE was first used clinically in 1962 by Sir John Charnley and emerged as the dominant bearing material for total hip and knee replacements in the 1970s. Throughout its history, there were unsuccessful attempts to modify UHMWPE to improve its clinical performance until the development of highly cross-linked UHMWPE in the late 1990s.

One unsuccessful attempt to modify UHMWPE was by blending the powder with carbon fibers. This reinforced UHMWPE was released clinically as "Poly Two" by Zimmer in the 1970s. The carbon fibers had poor compatibility with the UHMWPE matrix and its clinical performance was inferior to virgin UHMWPE.

A second attempt to modify UHMWPE was by high-pressure recrystallization. This recrystallized UHMWPE was released clinically as "Hylamer" by DePuy in the late 1980s. When gamma irradiated in air, this material exhibited susceptibility to oxidation, resulting in inferior clinical performance relative to virgin UHMWPE. Today, the poor clinical history of Hylamer is largely attributed to its sterilization method, and there has been a resurgence of interest in studying this material (at least among certain research circles). Hylamer fell out of favor in the United States in the late 1990s with the development of highly cross-linked UHMWPE materials, however negative clinical reports from Europe about Hylamer continue to surface in the literature.

Highly cross-linked UHMWPE materials were clinically introduced in 1998 and have rapidly become the standard of care for total hip replacements, at least in the United States. These new materials are cross-linked with gamma or electron beam radiation (50–105 kGy (5.0–10.5 Mrad)) and then thermally processed to improve their oxidation resistance. Five-year clinical data, from several centers, are now available demonstrating their superiority relative to conventional UHMWPE for total hip replacement. Clinical studies are still underway to investigate the performance of highly cross-linked UHMWPE for knee replacement.

In 2007, manufacturers started incorporating anti-oxidants into UHMWPE for hip and knee arthroplasty bearing surfaces. Vitamin E (a-tocopherol) is the most common anti-oxidant used in radiation-cross-linked UHMWPE for medical applications. The anti-oxidant helps quench free radicals that are introduced during the irradiation process, imparting improved oxidation resistance to the UHMWPE without the need for thermal treatment. Several companies have been selling antioxidant-stabilized joint replacement technologies since 2007, using both synthetic vitamin E as well as hindered phenol-based antioxidants.

Another important medical advancement for UHMWPE in the past decade has been the increase in use of fibers for sutures. Medical-grade fibers for surgical applications are produced by DSM under the "Dyneema Purity" trade name.

=== Manufacturing ===
UHMWPE is used in the manufacturing of PVC (PVC) windows and doors, as it can endure the heat required to soften the PVC-based materials and is used as a form/chamber filler for the various PVC shape profiles in order for those materials to be bent or shaped around a template.

UHMWPE is also used in the manufacture of hydraulic seals and bearings. It is best suited for medium mechanical duties in water, oil hydraulics, pneumatics, and unlubricated applications. It has a good abrasion resistance but is better suited to soft mating surfaces.

=== Wire and cable ===
Fluoropolymer / HMWPE insulation cathodic protection cable is typically made with dual insulation. It features a primary layer of a fluoropolymer such as ethylene-chlorotrifluoroethylene (ECTFE) which is chemically resistant to chlorine, sulfuric acid, and hydrochloric acid. Following the primary layer is an HMWPE insulation layer, which provides pliable strength and allows considerable abuse during installation. The HMWPE jacketing provides mechanical protection as well.

=== Marine infrastructure ===
UHMWPE is used in marine structures as facing of fender systems for berthing structures because of its superior wear resistance, impact resistance, and low friction both in wet and dry conditions.

== See also ==
- Low-density polyethylene (LDPE)
- Medium-density polyethylene (MDPE)
- Twaron
- IPX Ultra-high-molecular-weight polyethylene
