= Ballistic face mask =

Personal armor

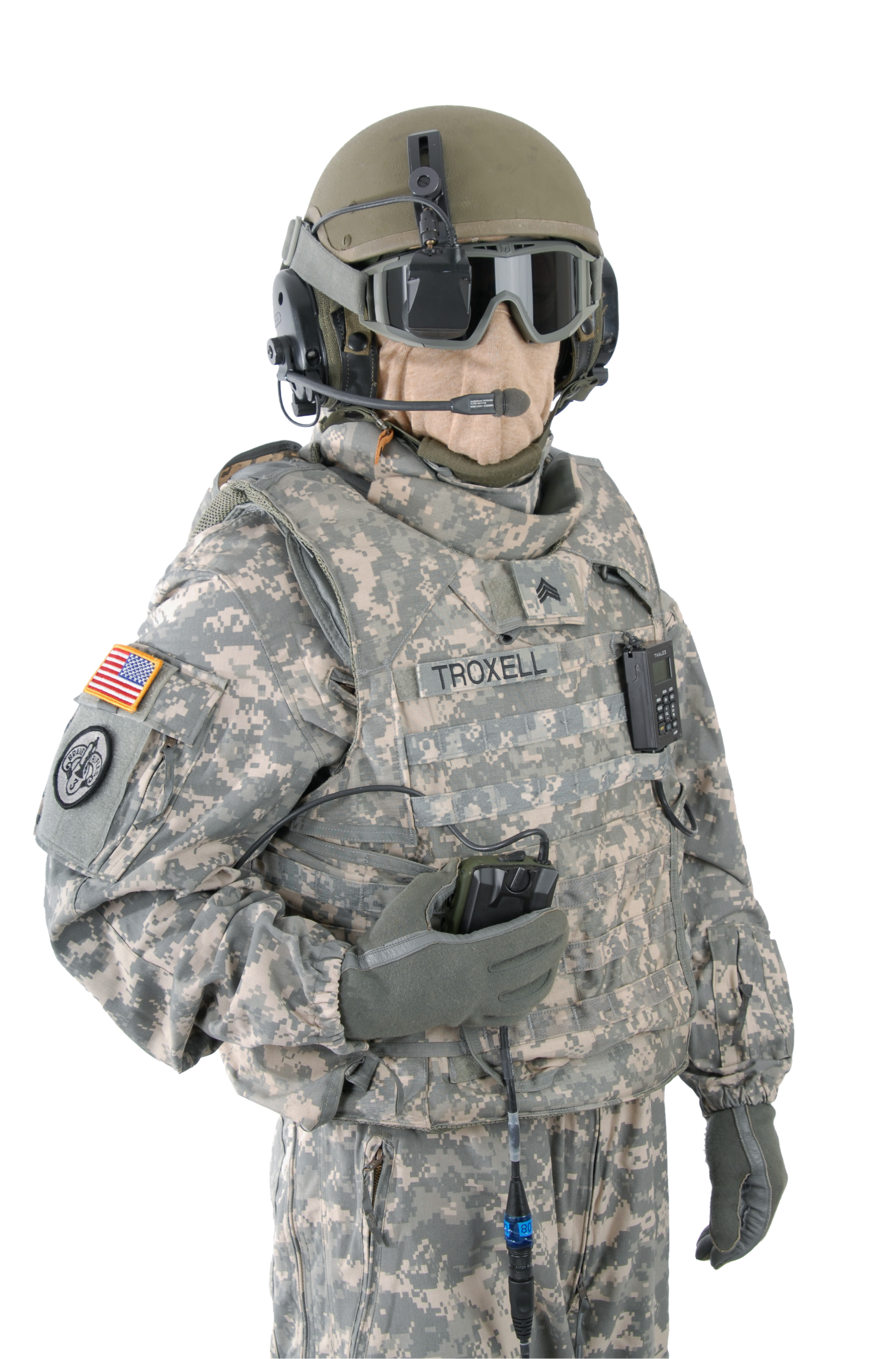
Ballistic face mask as part of the Mounted Soldier System.

A ballistic face mask, also known as facial armor, is a type of personal armor designed to protect the wearer's face from ballistic threats. Ballistic face masks are usually made of Kevlar or other bullet resistant materials and the inside of the mask may be padded for shock absorption, depending on the design.

Due to weight restrictions, protection levels range only up to NIJ Level IIIA, which offers protection from calibers up to .44 Magnum.

== History ==
In its October 2010 issue, Slate reported that while ballistic face masks were sometimes employed by law enforcement officers, they were not seen as worth using by combat soldiers. Brian Palmer further reported they were only capable of protecting the wearer's face from relatively small shrapnel fragments, and from the commonly used shot in shotgun shell intended to be used against birds, or small game. He particularly noted the masks would be useless against a 7.62×39mm bullet from a Kalashnikov rifle. Palmer also noted that the masks obscured a soldier's vision, were heavy, and didn't "breathe", meaning sweat wouldn't evaporate from the soldier's face, and would look unfriendly to the civilian population.

A November 2010 study from the Massachusetts Institute of Technology led by associate professor Raul Radovitzky suggested that equipping combatants with ballistic face shields could reduce traumatic brain injuries from bomb blasts, deflecting the pressure wave of the explosion away from the wearer's head. University of Adelaide neurologist Robert Vink claimed the study corroborated earlier testing on animals, which reached the same conclusions.

In 2012, it was reported that the United States Marine Corps was researching and testing MTek FAST G3A ballistic face shields that could protect troops from 7.62×39mm rounds as well as from shrapnel. They were described as lighter and more compact versions of the face shields used by explosive ordnance disposal personnel. By 2012, the successor model FAST G4 claims to stop a steel-core AK round from 25 feet away. By January 2023, however, the website simply claims to provide protection no less than the Army Advanced Combat Helmet and the Marine Lightweight Helmet, with no reference to rifle rounds.

A military parade in 2011 in Taipei showcased soldiers of the Republic of China Armed Forces special forces wearing ballistic masks as part of their uniform. Photographs of the soldiers taken and published by Japanese news website DDN Japan went viral in 2013.

== See also ==
- Balaclava
- Gas mask
- Goaltender mask
- Combat helmet
