= Personnel Armor System for Ground Troops =

Military equipment

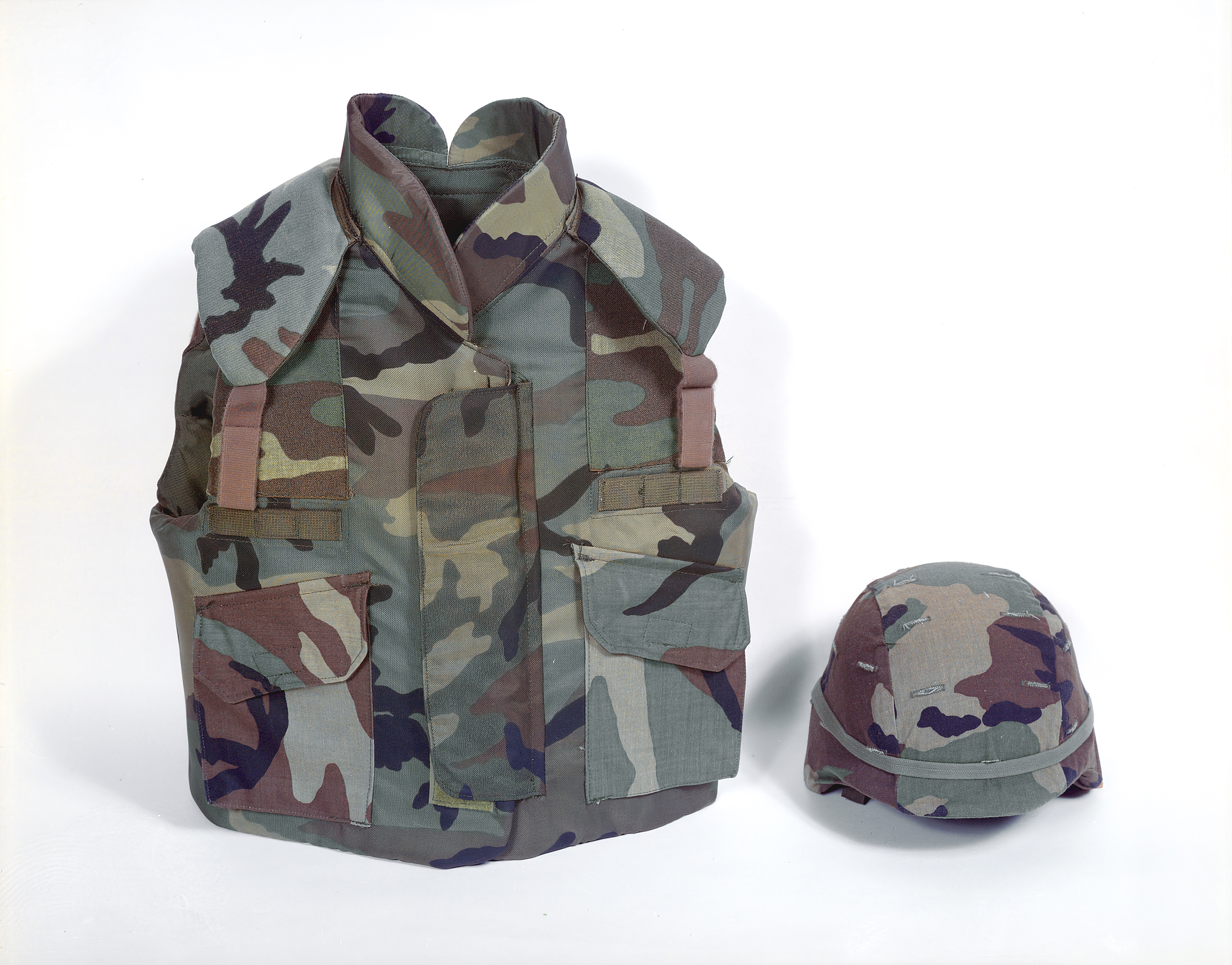
- A PASGT vest and helmet in woodland camouflage.
- Type: Combat helmet and bulletproof vest
- Place of origin: United States

Service history
- In service: 1983–2003 (U.S. Army & Marines) 1983–present (U.S. Navy); 1985–present (other countries)
- Used by: United States Navy; United States Coast Guard; U.S. Army (historical); U.S. Marine Corps (historical); U.S. Air Force (historical); See Users for other foreign military/law enforcement users
- Wars: Invasion of Grenada (first usage); Invasion of Panama; Persian Gulf War; Operation Gothic Serpent; Yugoslav Wars; Global War on Terrorism; War in Afghanistan; Iraq War; Russo-Ukrainian War; 2022 Russo-Ukrainian War

Production history
- Designer: U.S. Army Soldier Systems Center
- Designed: 1975 (vest), 1977 (helmet)
- Manufacturer: Gibraltar Industries (first known helmet/vest manufacturer); Made by numerous manufacturers, such as Isratex, Inc.
- Variants: U.S. Navy Flak Jacket (Mk 1, Mod 0)

Specifications
- Weight: Helmet: 1.41 kg (3.1 lb) to 1.91 kg (4.2 lb) depending on size; Vest: 3.2 kg (7.1 lb) to 4.9 kg (11 lb) depending on size

The Personnel Armor System for Ground Troops (PASGT, pronounced /ˈpæzɡət/ PAZ-gət) is a combat protective ensemble developed in the late 1970s by the United States. Introduced to frontline service in the early 1980s, the system consisted of a helmet and vest, both constructed primarily from Kevlar and was intended to deliver superior ballistic and fragmentation resistance compared to the steel M1 helmet and earlier nylon vests. PASGT was deployed extensively across major conflicts including the Invasion of Grenada and the Gulf War. While largely replaced in the early 2000s by the Interceptor Body Armor, and later by helmet systems like the Lightweight Helmet and Modular Integrated Communications Helmet, the PASGT helmet variant remains in limited service with the United States Navy.

== Name ==
PASGT is an acronym, standing for Personnel Armor System for Ground Troops. When used by itself, PASGT refers to both the vest and helmet together.

In the U.S. military, the PASGT helmet was most commonly known by its wearers as simply the "Kevlar". The nickname has since been adopted for usage with other helmets. The PASGT helmet was also referred to by its wearers in the U.S. military as the "K-pot", similar in name to the colloquial nickname "steel pot" for the steel M1 helmet, which was in widespread U.S. military usage from the 1940s to the 1980s, including the Vietnam War. The PASGT helmet was also, but less commonly, known by its wearers as the "Fritz" helmet for its resemblance to the Stahlhelm, which was the standard helmet used by the German military forces in the First and Second World Wars.

The PASGT vest was colloquially known as the "flak jacket" or "flak vest" by its wearers in the U.S. military, a continuation of the nickname from earlier nylon and fiberglass-based protective vests.

== Helmet ==
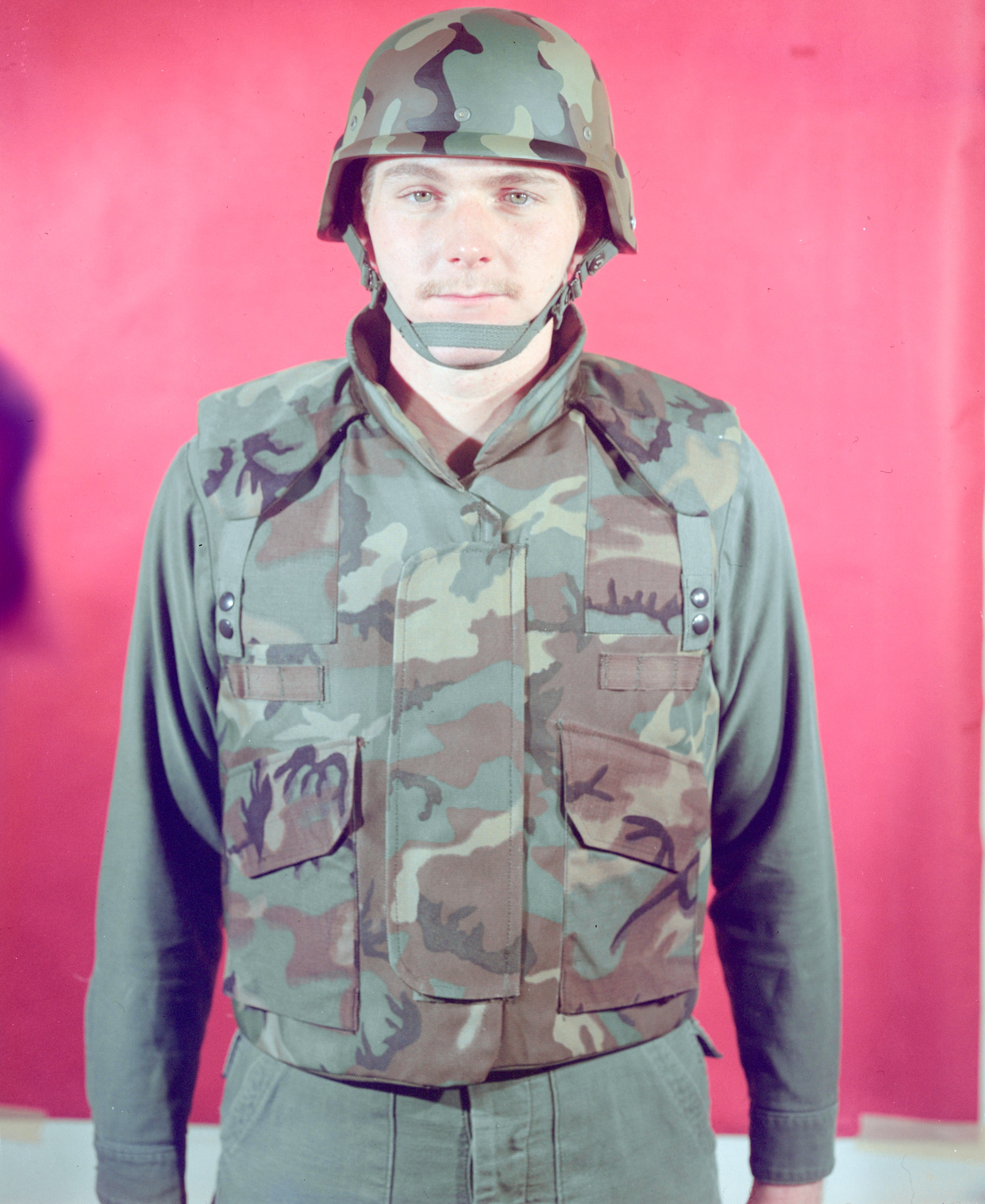
An early prototype variant of the PASGT helmet and vest in the ERDL pattern being worn over fatigues.

The PASGT helmet is a combat helmet first employed by the U.S. military in 1983 and eventually adopted by many other military and law enforcement agencies internationally. The shell is made from 19 layers of Kevlar, a ballistic aramid fabric treated with a phenolic resin system, and is rated at Threat Level IIIA. The helmet offers protection against shrapnel and ballistic threats. It meets the 1800 requirement of MIL-STD-662 E. It weighs from 3.1 lb (1,410 g) (size extra small) to 4.2 lb (1,910 g) (extra large).

=== Overview ===
The PASGT helmet is typically painted olive drab, though other colors such as tan, grey, and black could also be used. Camouflage was available in the form of cloth helmet covers with varying camouflage patterns, such as woodland, six-color desert, and three-color desert. Some PASGT helmets were retrofitted with newer camouflage colors, such as the Universal Camouflage Pattern and MultiCam.

Outside military use, the PASGT helmet has been used by SWAT teams, where it is often painted black. It has also been used by United Nations peacekeepers, where it is often painted United Nations blue with accompanying UN markings.

When worn with a helmet cover, the PASGT helmet is often fitted with an elastic band around it that has two light recharging glow patches (sometimes known as "cat eyes") on the rear, intended to reduce friendly fire incidents. These bands are also used to hold vegetation or small personal items, as with the M1 helmet before it. These bands can have names and blood types printed on them to identify the wearer and their blood type in the event of a casualty. In the U.S. Army, PASGT helmets often featured a patch with the wearer's rank insignia on it stitched onto the front, and/or a second patch showing the symbol of the wearer's unit on the sides. The U.S. Marines wore the Eagle, Globe, and Anchor insignia on the front of the helmet as an iron-on transfer, similar to the one worn by Marines on the breast pocket of the BDU. This practice continued with the adoption of the LWH, but fell out of use and was discontinued because the mounting base for night vision devices covered the emblem, and required a hole in the fabric to attach, defacing the symbol.

=== Development ===
The PASGT helmet was developed by the U.S. Army Soldier Systems Center after the Vietnam War during the mid-to-late 1970s. It completely replaced the steel M1 helmet in U.S. military service by the end of the 1980s. It first saw use in combat in 1983 during Operation Urgent Fury in Grenada, became standard issue for the U.S. military in 1985, and completely replaced the M1 helmet for frontline troops by the end of the decade. Army units stationed in Alaska were the last to receive the helmets, some not getting the PASGT until 1988.

=== Adoption issues and media controversy ===
After the PASGT's first combat appearance in Operation Urgent Fury, concerns surrounding the PASGT helmet's similarities to the German Stahlhelm were raised by the media, with such concerns even reaching congress.

The helmet was criticized as well for the lack of a removable liner, which meant it could no longer be used for cooking, shaving, or washing clothing. Many soldiers saw this as a loss of utility in comparison with the previous M1 helmet.

Lack of familiarity, public perception issues, and general utility concerns led U.S. Marines stationed in Lebanon as a part of the Multinational Force in Lebanon to initially refuse to wear the PASGT helmet until later combat reports from Operation Urgent Fury proved the helmet's vast superiority to the M1 helmet.

=== Accessories ===
Various add-on accessories were developed for the PASGT helmet, including an improved chinstrap to keep the helmet stable when worn by paratroopers conducting airborne operations, as well as a helmet mount assembly to attach night vision goggles, and a riot protection helmet visor mount.

=== Replacement ===
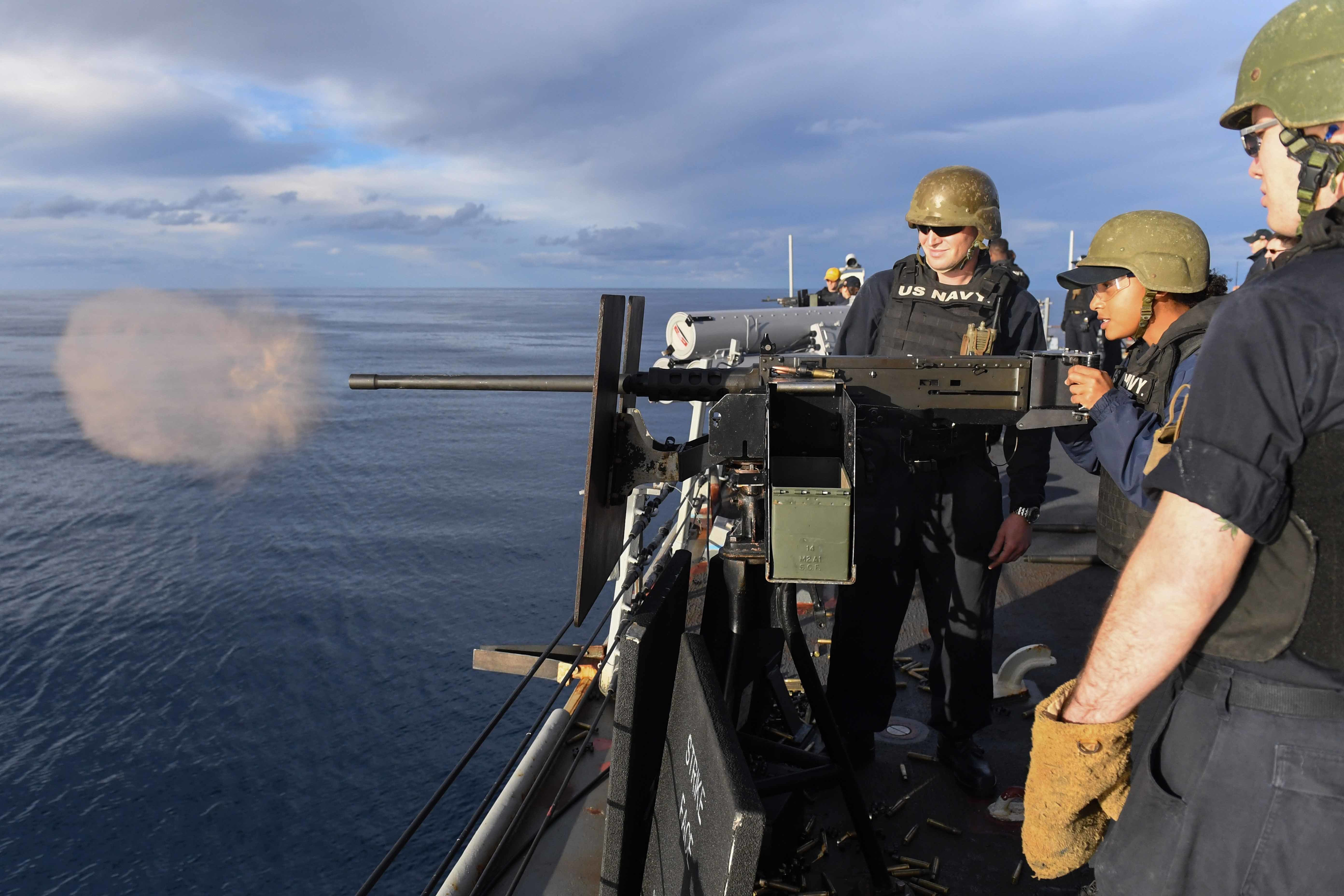
U.S. Navy sailors in January 2017 wearing PASGT helmets

The PASGT helmet was replaced in U.S. military service by the Lightweight Helmet for the U.S. Marine Corps and the Modular Integrated Communications Helmet by the U.S. Army, which was in turn replaced by the Advanced Combat Helmet.

Both were eventually replaced by the Enhanced Combat Helmet (ECH) around 2012 and 2014. The ECH is now in the process of being phased out in favor of the Integrated Head Protection System (IHPS).

The PASGT system is still used by some U.S. allies and still sees some continued limited use in the U.S. military as of 2017, serving as one of the options available for sailors assigned to duty aboard U.S. Navy and Coast Guard vessels.

== Vest ==
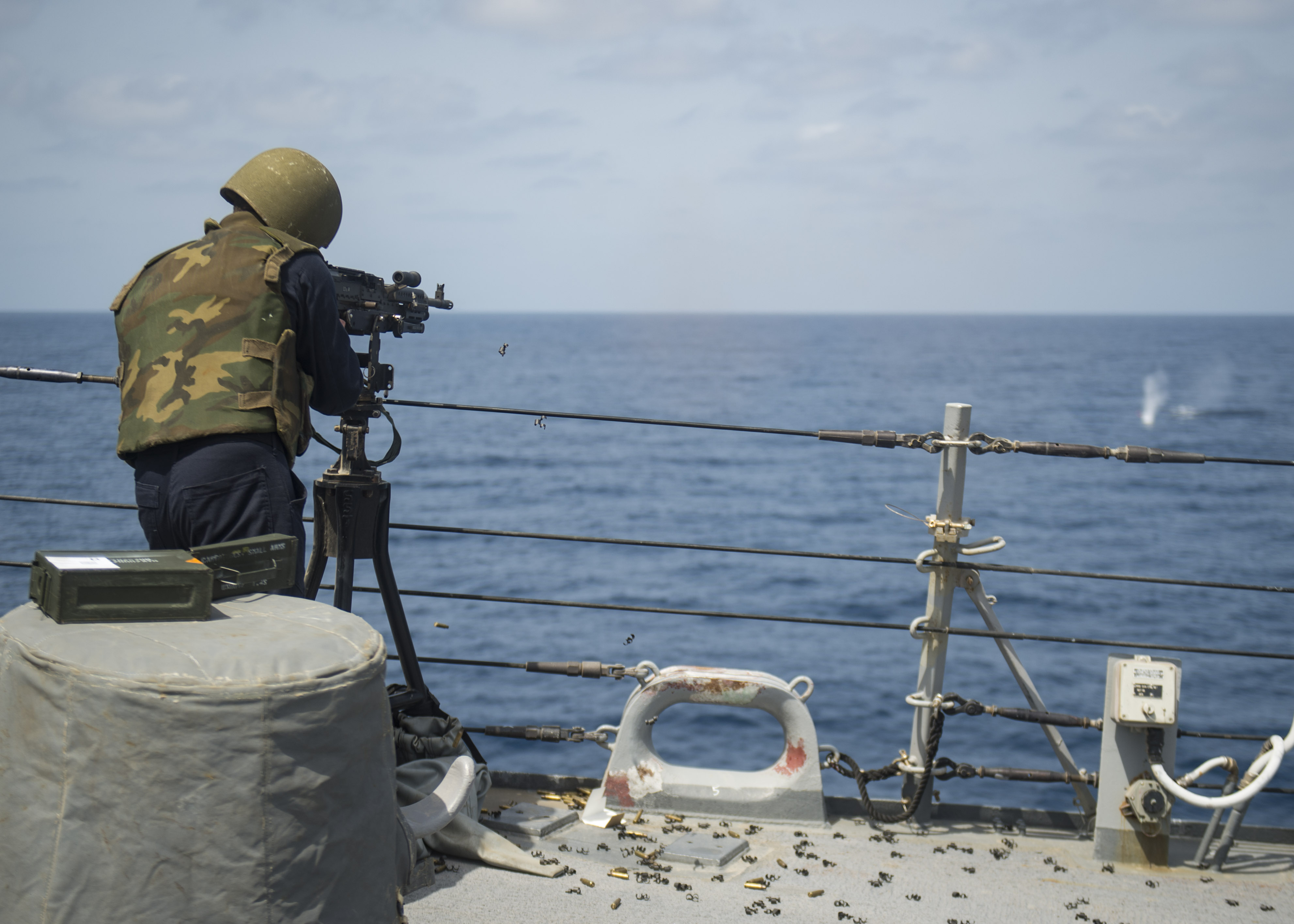
A U.S. Navy sailor in 2016 wearing a PASGT vest. Although it has been discontinued in the rest of the U.S. military, the U.S. Navy was still using the PASGT vest aboard its warships as late as June 2016.

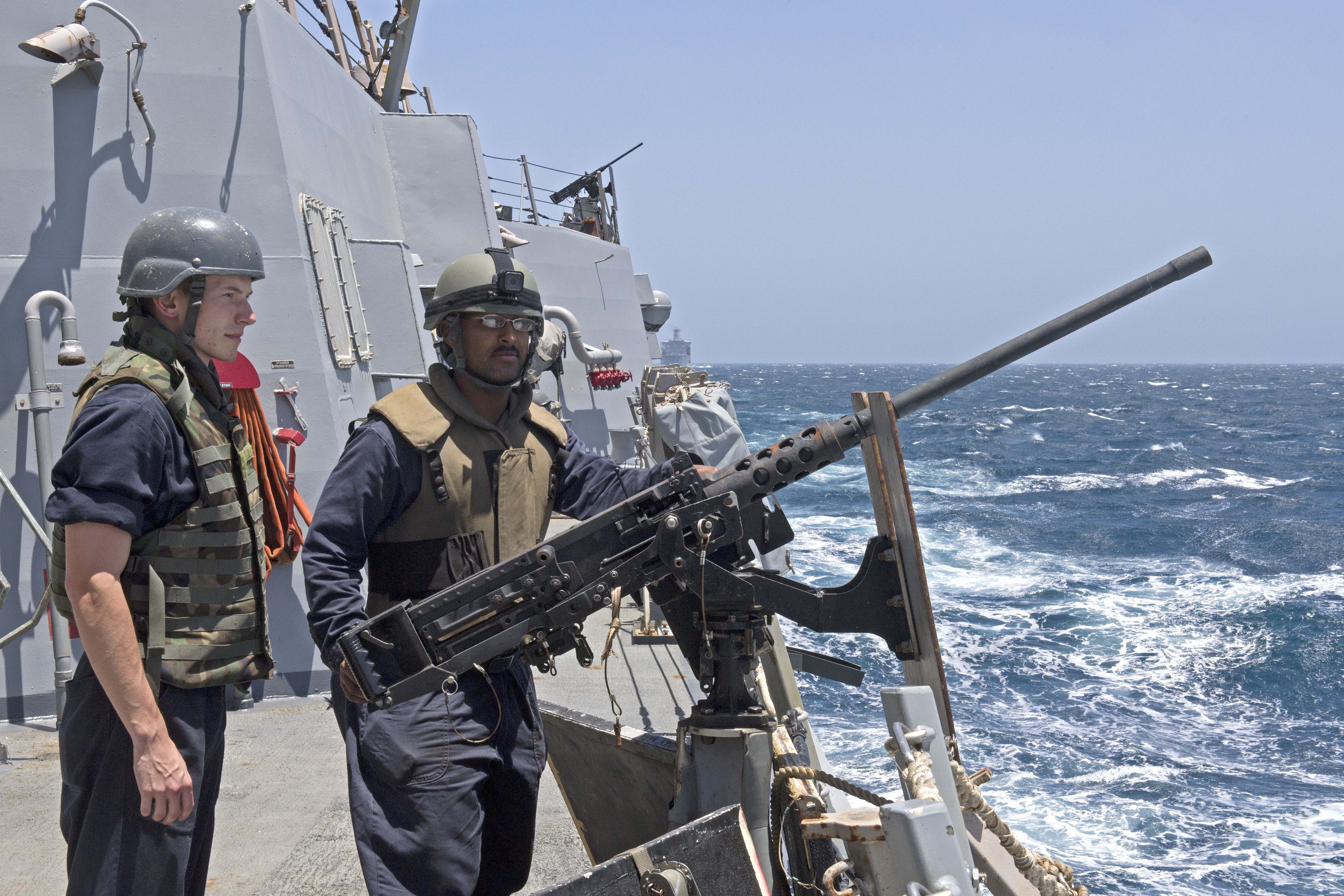
A U.S. Navy sailor in April 2017 wearing the PASGT-derived "U.S. Navy Flak Jacket". Although it is derived from the PASGT and is similar in appearance, the "U.S. Navy Flak Jacket" is actually a different model of vest altogether.

The PASGT vest was the U.S. military's standard upper torso body armor from the mid-1980s up until the early 2000s, when it was replaced by the Outer Tactical Vest of the Interceptor body armor system. The PASGT vest replaced the M-69 Fragmentation Protective Body Armor nylon vest used by the Army, and the M-1955 Fragmentation Protective nylon vest and doron plate vest used by the Marine Corps.

The PASGT vest used Kevlar for the first time in the U.S. military's body armor, unlike the ballistic nylon that was used in the models of body armor that preceded it. While generally incapable of stopping rifle bullets, the PASGT vest provided better protection against shrapnel and reduced the severity of injuries from small arms fire when compared to the M-69 flak vest. Despite its ability to stop pistol rounds, including 9×19mm Parabellum FMJ, the vest was only ever designed or intended to stop fragmentation without injury to the user. The PASGT vest weighs approximately 9 lb (4.1 kg), a small increase over the previous model. Based on testing conducted for the Brass Fetcher Ballistic Testing Company, former ARDEC research engineer John Ervin stated that the PASGT vest is equivalent to NIJ level II or IIA protection: able to stop multiple 124-grain 9×19mm FMJ pistol rounds to its main torso panels (front and back), but susceptible to several closely spaced rounds or shots to the thin neck and shoulder panels. Another independent test, featured in the magazine GunNews, claimed that the PASGT vest could stop .357 Magnum Federal 125 grain JHP, .357 Magnum S&W 158 grain JSP, 9mm Federal 115 grain FMJ, and 9mm +P+ Corbon 115 grain FMJ at a range of 10 yd (9.1 m), though was penetrated by a second closely spaced shot of 9mm Federal FMJ after the first.

=== Appearance ===
The PASGT vest is typically covered with woodland pattern nylon fabric, either the ERDL pattern or U.S. Woodland. A very limited number of vests were made in olive drab, but only woodland versions were issued to U.S. forces. Like the PASGT helmet, camouflage covers were available to be worn atop the vest in various patterns. Early camouflage covers were in DBDU but later came in the DCU pattern.

=== Development ===
The PASGT vest was designed in 1975 and was tested by in the late 1970s before being fielded in the early 1980s.

==== U.S. Navy Flak Jacket ====
In January 2000, the U.S. Navy began using a derivative variant of the PASGT vest known as the "U.S. Navy Flak Jacket Mk 1, Mod 0". This vest was still being used by the U.S. Navy as late as April 2017. The USN Flak Jacket is sage green or brown in color. Although this vest is quite similar in appearance to the PASGT vest, it actually is a different model of vest altogether.

=== Accessories and usage ===
In order to provide protection against high velocity bullets, the PASGT vest was, in 1996, combined with the Interim Small Arms Protective Overvest (ISAPO) pending the adoption of Interceptor body armor. The ISAPO weighed about 16.5 lb (7.5 kg) and consisted of a carrier to hold two protective ceramic plate inserts. A PASGT armor system with overvest weighed more than 25.1 lb (11.4 kg) and was criticized by many U.S. troops as unacceptably cumbersome in combat. The ballistic fill consists of 13 plies of 14 oz (400 g). water repellent treated Aramid (Kevlar 29) fabric. The inner and outer cover, shoulder pads and front closure flap of the vest are water repellent treated 8 oz. ballistic nylon cloth.

While it had been phased out as frontline body armor by the start of the Iraq War in 2003, the PASGT vest saw some limited wear and usage by U.S. military personnel during the early stages of the war, where it was worn behind the frontlines by rear-echelon support personnel and navy sailors such as Seabees. Some U.S. Army soldiers used old PASGT vests as makeshift armor for their vehicles in the absence of actual up-armor kits.

=== Replacement ===
The PASGT vest was succeeded in U.S. military service by the outer tactical vest of the Interceptor body armor system, which was, in turn, partly replaced by the Modular Tactical Vest, Improved Outer Tactical Vest, and Scalable Plate Carrier. However, the PASGT vest still sees some limited use in the U.S. military as of 2016, where it serves as one of many vests for sailors assigned to duty on board U.S. Navy vessels.

== Users ==
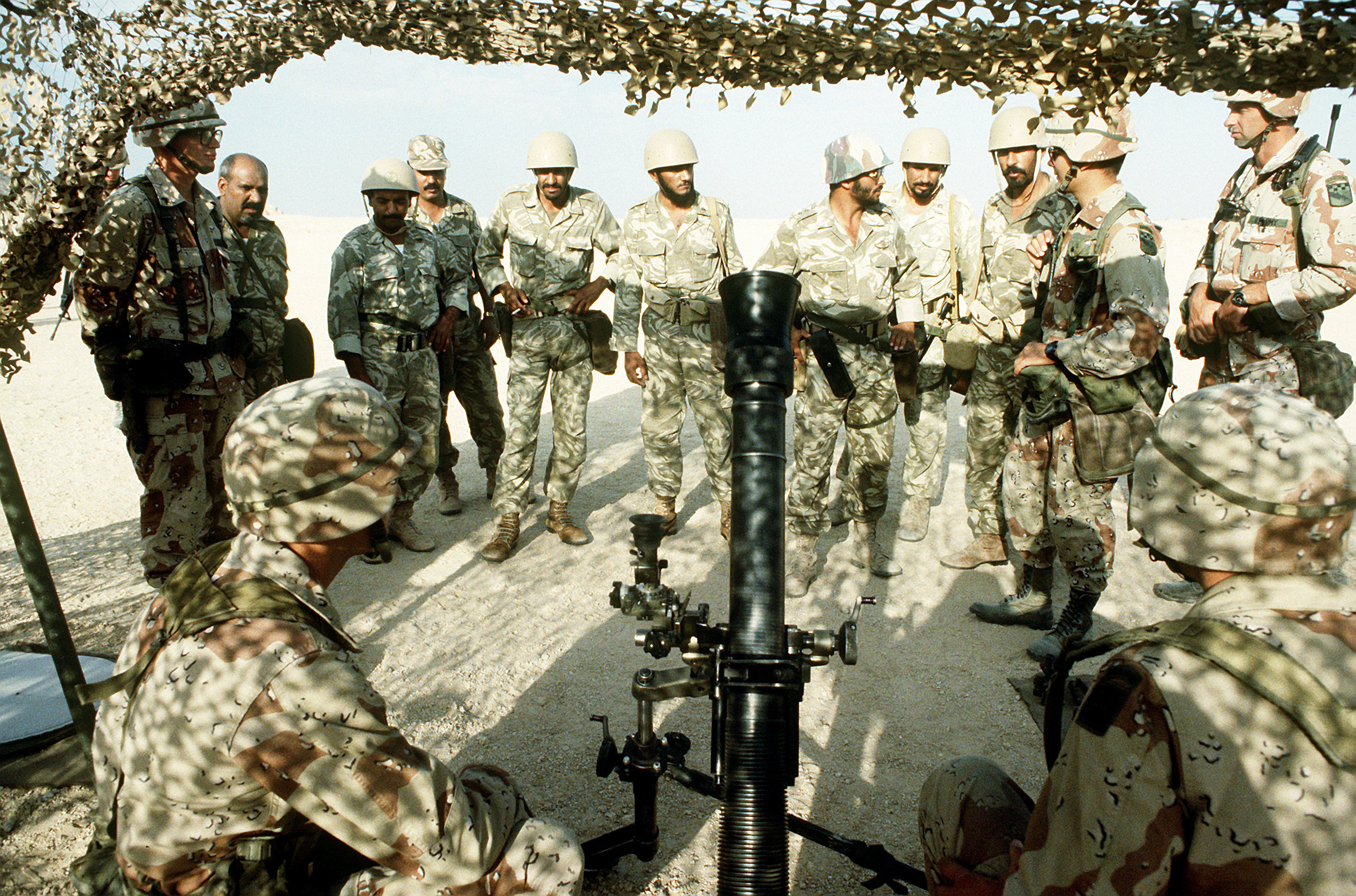
A member of the U.S. Army 1st Battalion, 325th Airborne Infantry Regiment, explaining the M252 mortar to Saudi Arabian national guardsmen; the American soldiers are wearing PASGT helmets.

=== Current ===
- Afghanistan: Uses ArmorSource-made PASGT helmets provided through FMS sales.
- Argentina: Used by the Argentine Army.
- Armenia: New Standard Helmet, used widely since 2023.
- Brazil: Uses both U.S. and Brazilian-made PASGT helmets.
- Bolivia: Adopted by the Bolivian Armed Forces in the 1990s.
- Bosnia and Herzegovina: Both the vest and helmet are used by the Bosnian armed forces.
- Chile: The PASGT helmet has been used by the Chilean Marine Corps from the 1980s to the present. During the 2000s and early 2010s they used it in conjunction with the Interceptor multi-threat body armor system along with the U.S. Woodland camouflage and currently use it with a night sight mount along with the Advanced Combat Helmet and MultiCam camouflage.
- Costa Rica: Used since 1990s by various Costa Rican public security units.
- Dominican Republic: Used by the Dominican military, replacing all M1 helmets.
- Ecuador: Ecuadorian-made PASGT helmets in use by the military.
- El Salvador: Used in El Salvadorian military to replace M1 helmets.
- Estonia: PASGT vests used by reservists.
- Greece: Used by Hellenic Army.
- Haiti: Used by Haitian National Police.
- Hong Kong SAR: PASGT helmets were used by various Hong Kong Police Force units including the Special Duties Unit, Counter Terrorism Response Unit, Emergency Unit and EOD.
- Indonesia: Locally made PASGT helmets, Standard issue for Indonesian Armed Forces and the Indonesian Police. Currently being phased out and replaced by the MICH.
- Iraq: Used by Iraqi commandos operating under Counter-Terrorism Service mandate.
- Israel: Used by the Israeli military, most supplied by the U.S. with some made by Orlite.
- Kazakhstan: PASGT helmet and vest used by Kazakh Ground Forces.
- Lebanon: Standard issue helmet of the Lebanese Armed Forces
- Malaysia: Locally made PASGT helmets were standard issue for Malaysian Armed Forces and General Operations Force. Currently being phased out in favour of Future Assault Shell Technology helmet.
- Mexico: Mexican military uses both American and Mexican-made PASGT helmets.
- Moldova: PASGT helmets and vests have been used since 2000s.
- Nicaragua: PASGT helmets have been used since the 1990s by the Nicaraguan military.
- Pakistan: PASGT helmets and vests locally made, used by Pakistan Armed Forces.
- Philippines: Standard issue for Philippine Army and Philippine Marine Corps.
- Portugal: Used by Portuguese Army.
- Saudi Arabia: Used by Saudi Arabian Army and Saudi Arabian National Guard.
- Slovenia: Used by the Slovenian Special Police Unit (Specialna Enota Policije).
- Taiwan: Taiwanese-made PASGT helmets made for the Taiwanese military.
- Thailand: PASGT Used by Royal Thai Army and Royal Thai Marine Corps Since 1984
- Turkey: PASGT vests were used by Amphibious Marine Brigade.
- United States: PASGT vests were still used by the US Navy aboard its warships as of June 2016. The U.S. Navy also uses a PASGT-derived vest known as the "U.S. Navy Flak Jacket". PASGT helmets are still used by the U.S. Navy aboard its warships as of January 2017.
- Ukraine: Used by Aidar/Donbas Battalions.
- Uruguay: Mostly used by Uruguayan UN peacekeepers. Some are used by the National Police of Uruguay.
- Venezuela: Uses PASGT helmets made in China for the Venezuelan military.
- Vietnam: Uses Vietnamese-made PASGT helmets, as well as imported Israeli ones.

=== Former ===
- Australia: Australian-made M91 variant produced by RBR Armor Systems and American-made helmets used by the Australian Defence Force from the 1990s until 2005. Replaced by the RBH-303-AU Enhanced Combat Helmet.
- Canada: PASGT helmets were first seen trialed by troops during Exercise Reforger 83 but only saw limited adoption by the Canadian Army in the early 1990s to replace the M1 helmet during United Nations peacekeeping activities in the Balkans, Somalia and Rwanda. The PASGT helmets were phased out by the mid 2000s with the adoption of the CG634 in 1997 and full production and acquisition of the helmet for active service. Canadian Forces also used body armour based on the PASGT to replace the older M69 fragmentation vests as early as 1990, seen during the Oka Crisis and would be used till the mid 2000s when it was fully replaced by the CTS Body Armour System from Pacific Safety Products.
- Georgia: PASGT helmets replaced by Delta manufactured combat helmets.
- New Zealand all branches of New Zealand Defence Force. From 2000. Supplied by UNICOR. Identical to the USMC Lightweight helmet. The NZ PASGT was replaced in 2009 with the Australian RBH-303-AU Enhanced Combat Helmet.
- Singapore: PASGT helmets formerly used by the Singapore Armed Forces made by International Scientific Pte Ltd. with some refurbished by All Defense Technology Pte Ltd.
- United States
  - United States Army: Replaced by the Interceptor body armor and Modular Integrated Communications Helmet.
  - U.S. Marine Corps: Replaced by the Lightweight Helmet and Interceptor body armor.
  - Los Angeles Police Department: PASGT helmets were formerly used by the LAPD SWAT.

== PASGT helmet variants and derivatives ==
Name	Origin	Notes
M91 helmet	Australia	Australian PASGT derived helmet made by RBR Armour Systems Pty Ltd. In service with all branches of the Australian Defence Force from the 1990s to 2005. Identical to the American PASGT helmet with the exception of having a 4-point chin strap.
CABAL II	Argentina	Argentine PASGT derived helmet.
Capacete Combate Ballistico	Brazil	Brazilian PASGT derived helmet.
GOLFO	Chile	Chilean PASGT-derived helmet. The helmet is locally made by Baselli Hermanos S.A of kevlar and was introduced in 2000. It is capable of stopping a 9×19mm round at 310 m (1,020 ft).
Gefechtshelm Schuberth B826 helmet	Germany	German military helmet, used primarily by the German Bundeswehr, Swiss Armed Forces, Dutch Army, and the Estonian Defence Forces.
SPECTRA helmet	France	French military helmet, used primarily by the Danish Army, French Army and the Canadian military.
Type 88 helmet	Japan	Japanese military helmet, used by the Japanese Self-Defense Forces and the Japanese Coast Guard.
JK 96a light Light Steel Helmet	China	Chinese military light steel helmet. PASGT-derivative replica helmet, made of light steel and not Kevlar. Used primarily by the People's Liberation Army of the People's Republic of China.
JK 96b Light Steel Helmet	China	Chinese military light steel helmet. PASGT-derivative replica helmet, made of light steel and not Kevlar. Used primarily by the People's Liberation Army of the People's Republic of China.
NDH 2001 helmet	China	Chinese helmet, produced by the China North Industries Corporation. Norinco produces two types of these PASGT-derivative replica helmets, designed towards civilian police usage.
NDH 2006 helmet	China	Chinese helmet, produced by the China North Industries Corporation. Norinco produces two types of these PASGT-derivative replica helmets, designed towards civilian police usage.
OE Tech Tactical helmet	China	Replica helmet only.
ST-4 helmet	Romania	Romanian PASGT derived helmet.
M97 Helmet	Serbia	Serbian PASGT derived helmet.
C-1 Kevlar helmet	Singapore	Used primarily by the Singaporean Armed Forces.
M87 Kevlar helmet	South Africa	South African helmet issued to the SADF. Made by South African Pith Helmet Industries.
Kevlar VestGuard helmet	United Kingdom	The British VestGuard helmet comes in two different variants, the M88 version, and the Kevlar version. Also made by LBA International Ltd.
M88 VestGuard helmet	United Kingdom	The British VestGuard helmet comes in two different variants, the M88 version, and the Kevlar version. Also made by LBA International Ltd.
Advanced Combat Helmet	United States	Used primarily by the United States Army and United States Air Force, although it sees widespread usage throughout the U.S. military and is widely used among civilian law enforcement throughout the United States. The ACH helmet is based upon the design of the Modular Integrated Communications Helmet, offering increased ballistic protection over the MICH helmet on which it is based. The ACH helmet has replaced the PASGT helmet in United States Army usage, and is the successor to the MICH helmet.
Lightweight Helmet	United States	Used primarily by the United States Marine Corps and the United States Navy. Abbreviated to LWH, the Lightweight Helmet is heavily based upon the PASGT helmet design, being nearly identical in appearance, however it offers increased ballistic protection and wearer comfort over the preceding PASGT helmet. The Lightweight Helmet has replaced the PASGT helmet in United States Marine Corps and United States Navy service.
Modular Integrated Communications Helmet	United States	Used primarily by the United States Army and United States Air Force, although it sees widespread usage throughout the U.S. military and is widely used among civilian law enforcement throughout the United States. The Modular Integrated Communications Helmet is the predecessor to the Advanced Combat Helmet, which is an improved design, based upon the design of the MICH helmet.

== See also ==
- HRM tactical vest
- 6B2 ballistic vest, Soviet counterpart vest
- 6B7 helmet Soviet counterpart helmet
- Interceptor multi-threat body armor system, the body armor that succeeded the PASGT vest in U.S. military service
- Headgear of the United States Army
