= BA 9000 =

United States body armor standard

BA 9000 Body Armor Quality Management System Requirements were established by the National Institute of Justice as a quality standard for body armor. It specifies the construction and assembly requirements of personal armor for federal, state, tribal and local law enforcement and corrections agencies; the requirements of BA 9000 are voluntary (but it is recommended by the NIJ).

Though BA 9000 was written to be in compliance with ISO 9001, the NIJ notes that a company being certified as ISO 9001 is not necessarily certified as being BA 9000-compliant. BA 9000 incorporates all of the standards of ISO 9001, but it also:

- Details the procedures body armor manufacturers need to take to communication with the compliance testing program
- Ensures the accountability of armor by mandating a unique identifier for each piece used
- Management of work areas to reduce any adverse effects on the armor
- Specifies that testing must be done at approved facilities; these facilities must be compliant with ISO 17025

While certification to BA 9000 is not mandated or regulatory, its benefits include:

- Reduced Testing – For manufacturers who are BA 9000 certified, testing frequency can be reduced by half.
- Competitive Advantage – Certification to a standard such as BA 9000 is an indicator of a quality product. This is a great advantage in an industry where quality could be the difference between life and death.

Facilities seeking to become a BA 9000 certification body must, in addition to being ISO 17025-certified, submit to yearly office and an overall audit of the management systems in place. The accreditation is normally for a period of four years.
