= JK 96 helmet =

Chinese combat helmet

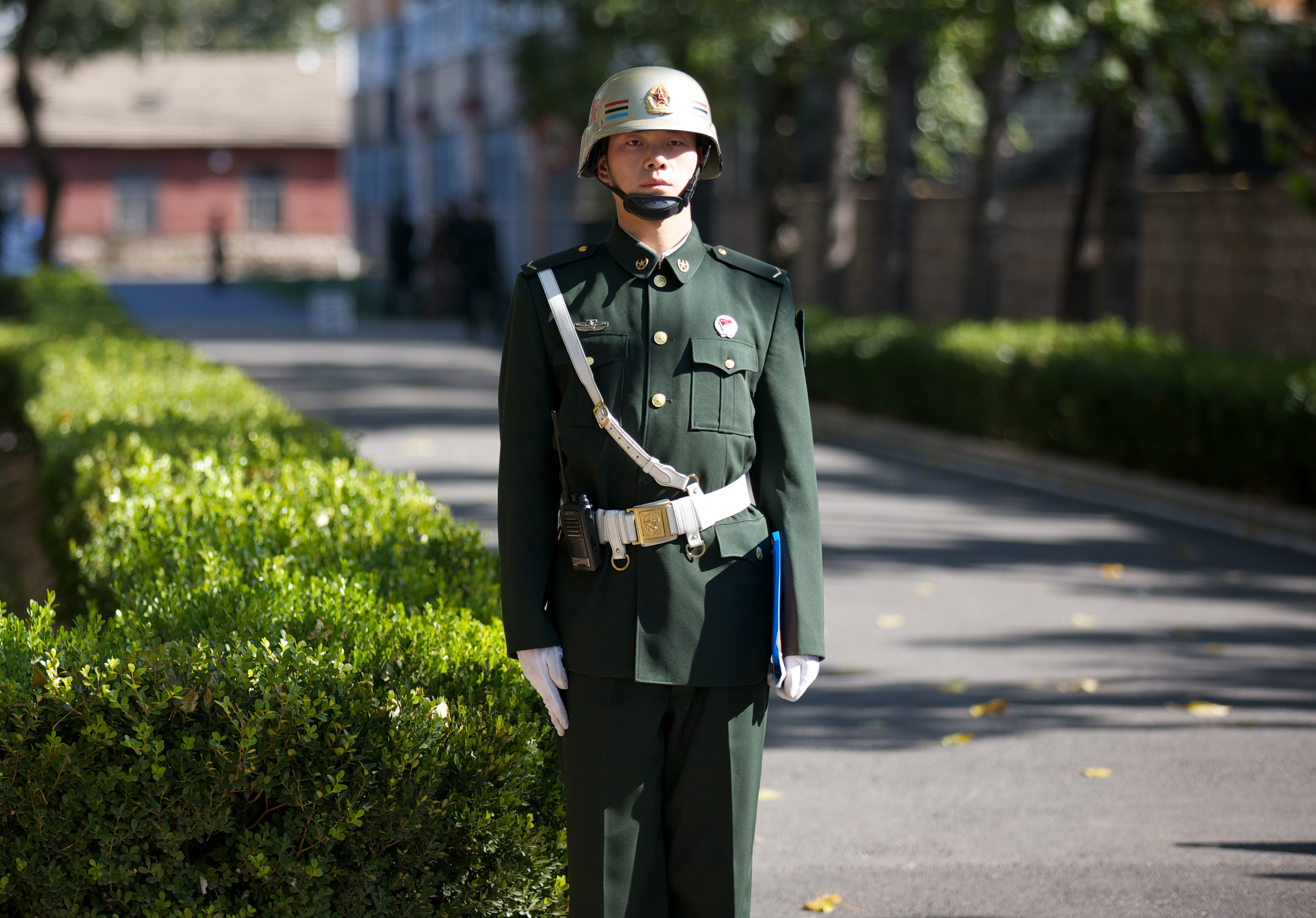
- A PLA guard wearing JK 96B helmet on duty outside the dining facility.
- Type: Combat Helmet
- Place of origin: China

Service history
- In service: 1996-present
- Used by: See Users
- Wars: Syrian Civil War

Production history
- Variants: JK 96; JK 96B

Specifications
- Weight: JK 96 1850g JK 96B 2100g

JK 96 Light Steel Helmet (Chinese: JK96钢盔) is a Chinese copy of the American Personnel Armor System for Ground Troops helmet. The liner is a copy of the American Riddel suspension system. Being manufactured since 1996 for Chinese service only

The Chinese PASGT-style helmet is not made of composite material, but rather from light steel.

The helmet is worn by some elements of the People's Liberation Army and police SWAT teams in China to replace Soviet-era headgear.

The JK 96b is a version of the JK 96a with a different nylon lining.

== Users ==
- China

=== Former ===
- Ba'athist Syria: Imported from China.
