= Mounted Soldier System =

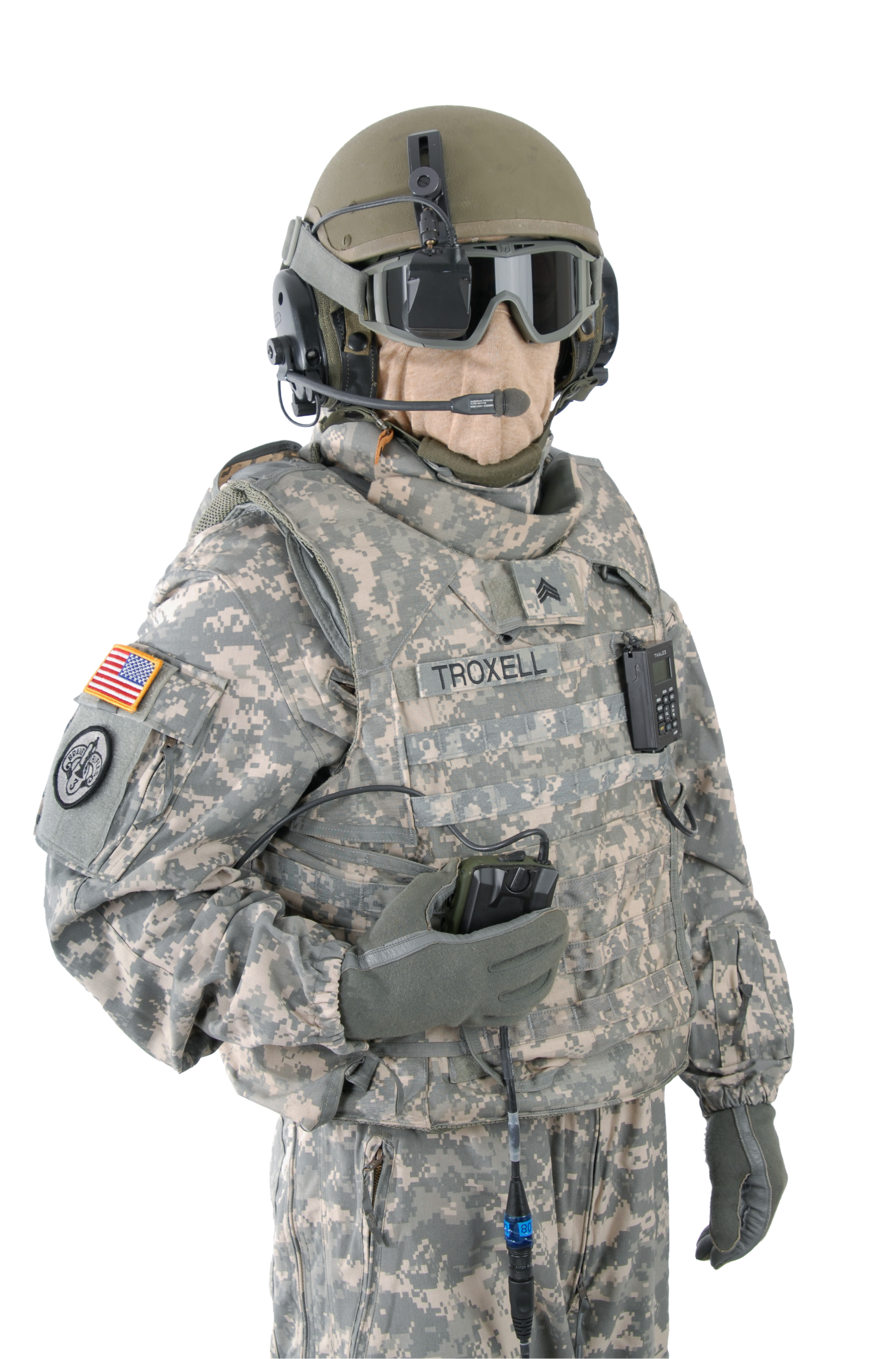
The Mounted Soldier System is standard wear for ground vehicle crew members.

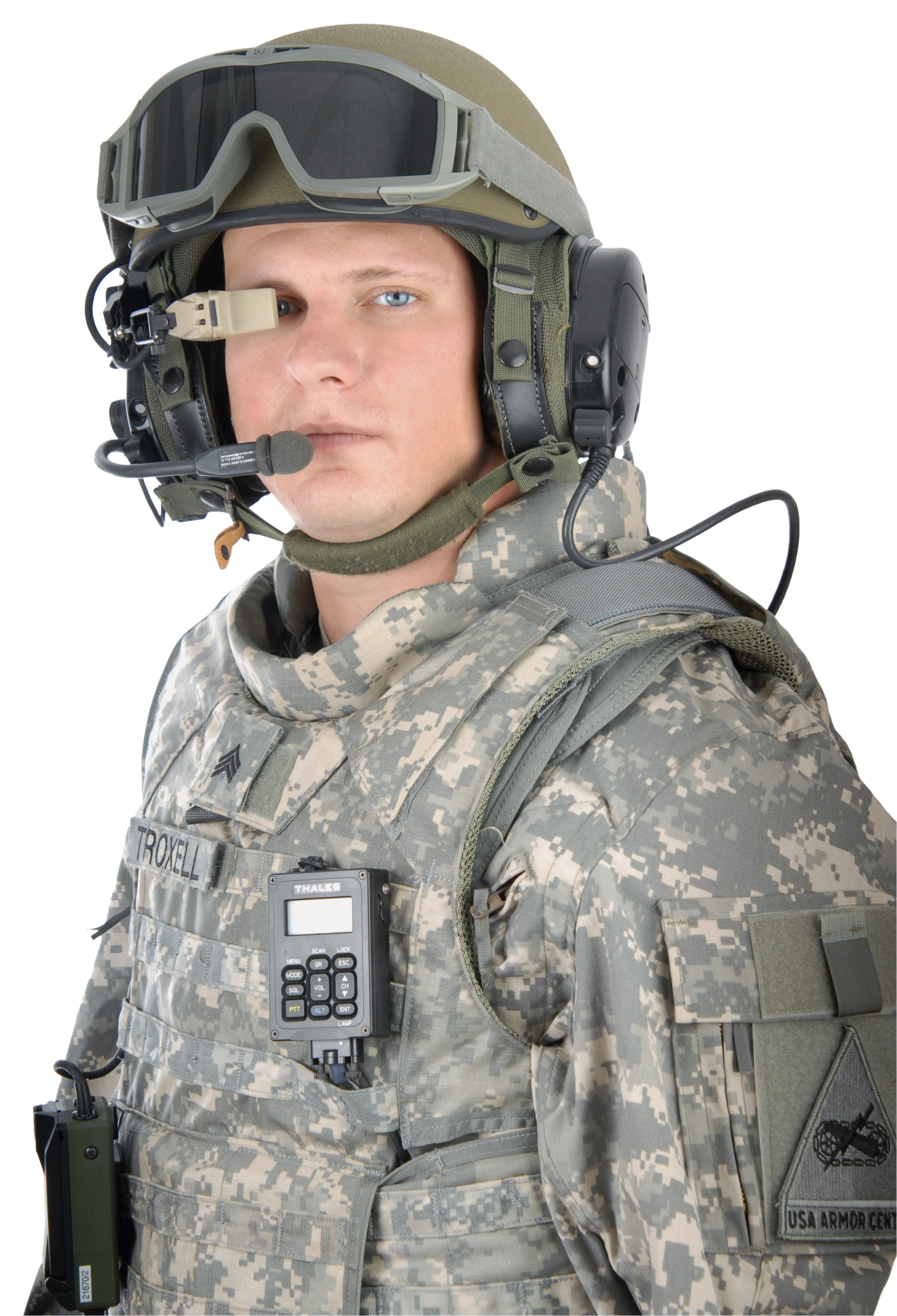
Tank crewman.

The Mounted Soldier System (MSS) or Ground Warrior is a combat vehicle crewman ensemble integrating advanced gear as an effective force multiplier in combat theater.

== Sub-components ==
The MSS consists of a heads-up display, cordless communications, micro-climatic cooling, and force protection items. These subsystems will provide platform commanders and vehicle crew members increased effectiveness on the network-centric battlefield in areas of command and control, situational awareness, communications, and force protection.

=== Helmet-Mounted Display ===
This system shows vehicle situational awareness information and sensors, and can also control video signals from various sources. The integration supports up to four crewmen per platform and up to three SMPTE and two SVGA signals.

=== Cordless Communications ===
The Cordless Communications Capabilities provide the platform's crew with a wireless connection capability to the vehicle's intercom and radios. It allows the crew to communicate by voice over the platform's intercom system when mounted or dismounted within 300 meters of their platform. The system automatically detects when a crewman becomes disconnected from the intercom system and allows the disconnected crewman to continue to have voice communication with the crew and access to the platform's tactical net radios.

=== Microclimate Cooling System ===
The Microclimate Cooling System is integrated into the platform and features a cooling vest worn by the Soldier. This will reduce crewman heat stress and provide increased comfort during operations in hot environments.

=== Soldier Force Protection System ===
Soldier safety is enhanced with the Improved Combat Vehicle Crewman Coverall, flame-resistant moisture wicking undergarments, ballistic and laser eye protection, and flame-resistant hand, face, and foot protection. Soldier effectiveness is improved through enhanced systems engineering and integration of capabilities. Facial protection and improvements to body armor are also being pursued.

== History ==
Integration was first performed to a limited extent to 4th Battalion, 9th Infantry Regiment in Operation Iraqi Freedom. Increment II is in advanced stages of development.

== Sources ==
- This article incorporates work from https://peosoldier.army.mil/FactSheets/PMSWAR/SWAR_MSS_MSS.pdf%5B‍%5D, which is in the public domain as it is a work of the United States Military.
