= HRM tactical vest =

American ballistic vest

High Risk Modular (HRM) tactical vest
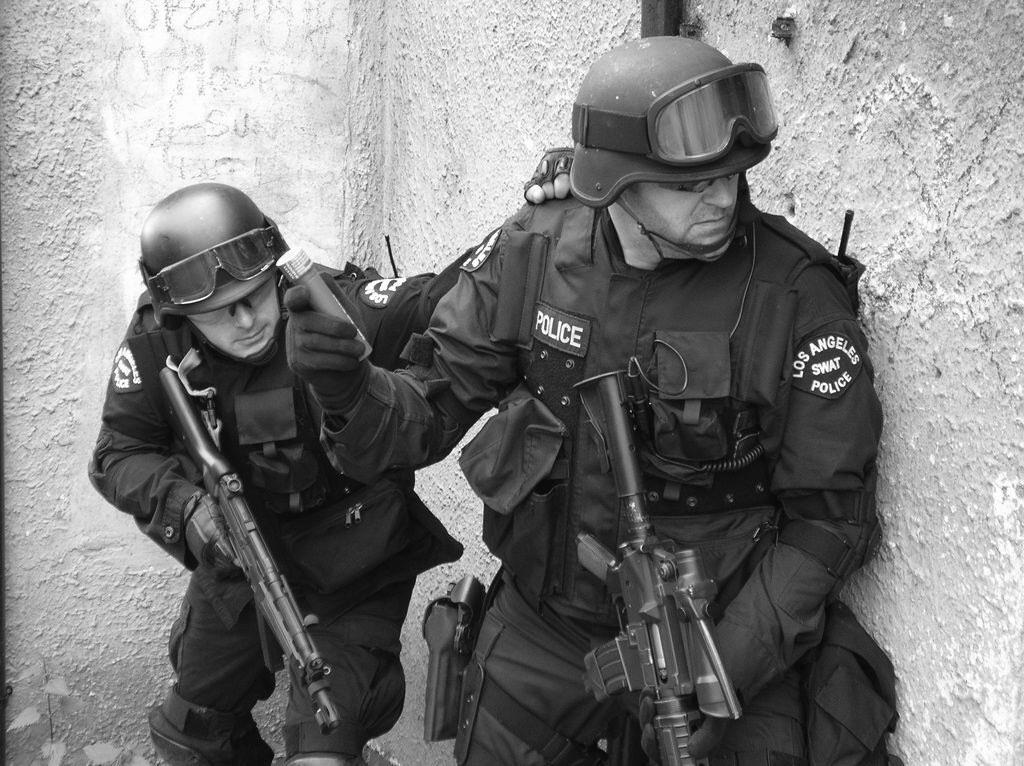
- LAPD SWAT officers wearing HRM vests in the early 2000s
- Type: Body armor
- Place of origin: United States

Service history
- In service: 1984–2011
- Used by: United States Marine Corps; LAPD Metropolitan Division; NYPD Emergency Service Unit; Various SWAT teams and police tactical units
- Wars: War on drugs War on terror

Production history
- Manufacturer: Point Blank Enterprises

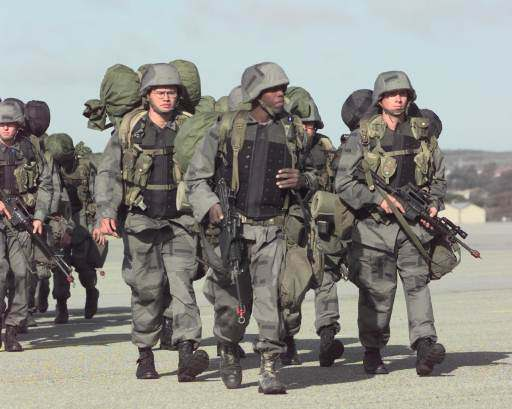
U.S. Marines wearing HRM vests during Operation Urban Warrior in 1999

The High Risk Modular (HRM) tactical vest is an American ballistic vest developed by Point Blank Enterprises and produced between roughly 1984 and 2006. It is constructed from Kevlar and is rated at NIJ Level IIIA.

Per its name, the HRM vest was intended to have a modular design, using Velcro, snap fasteners, and zippers to allow pouches for magazines, grenades, tactical tools, radios, ballistic plates, and other equipment to be mounted to the vest. This differed from early ballistic vests of the era that often had fixed sewn-in pouches and pockets, if any were included to begin with.

== History ==
Production and issuance of the HRM vest ended in the mid-2000s as newer, improved ballistic vests became available to law enforcement customers and it became increasingly clear that, while acceptable against small-caliber threats common in the 1980s and 1990s, the HRM vest was insufficient against higher-caliber threats such as rifles that were becoming more common into the 21st century. Replicas of the HRM vest remain popular in the civilian market, particularly in cosplay, airsoft, costume design, and police memorabilia collecting.

=== Operational Use ===
The HRM vest was used by various police tactical units in North America, including the LAPD Metropolitan Division SWAT and the NYPD Emergency Service Unit among others, as well as the United States Marine Corps. Its frequent use by police, particularly the LAPD SWAT, led to its prominent appearances in productions such as Speed (1994), Heat (1995), and S.W.A.T. (2003), solidifying its cultural influence as an archetypal "SWAT vest" even into the present day.

== Design ==
The HRM vest was similar in design and nature to other vests produced in the late 1990s and early 2000s, including models by the Protective Apparel Corporation of America (PACA; a subsidiary of Point Blank) and Second Chance, which also featured similar modular pouch attachment systems.
