= Land Warrior =

Cancelled US Army program

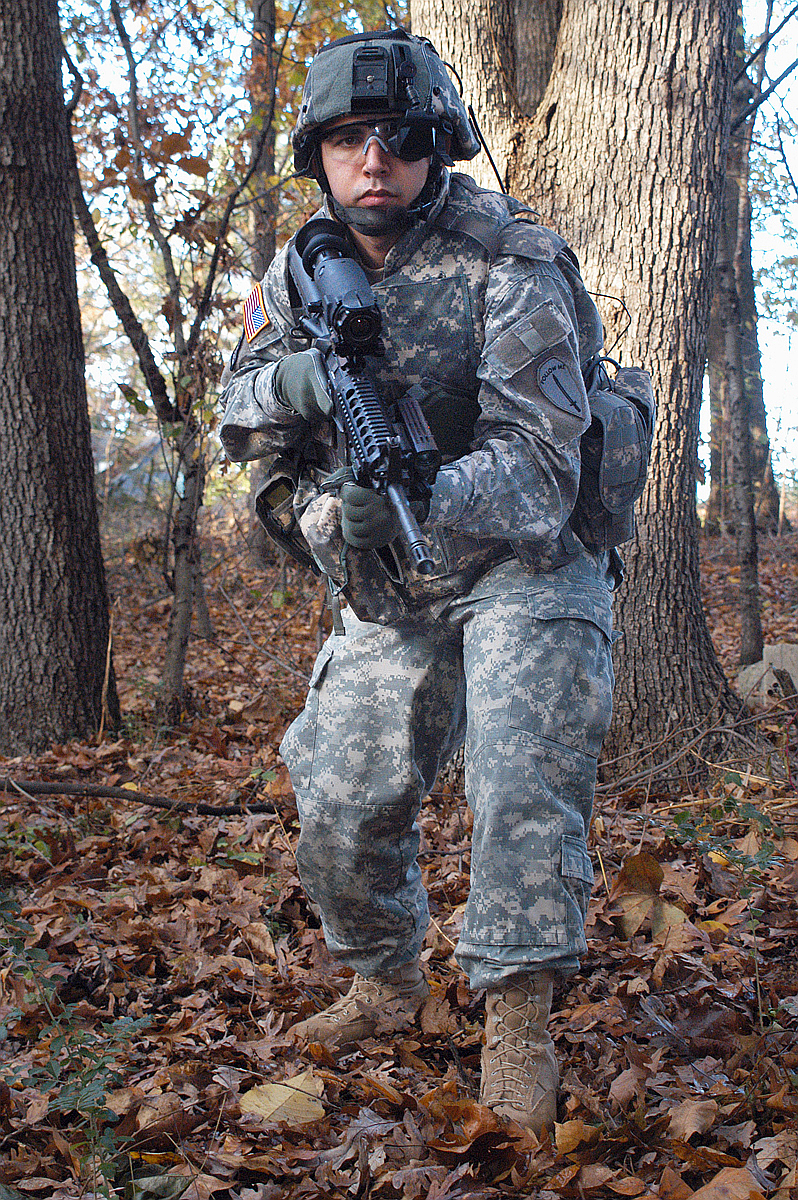
Elements of the Land Warrior system, as showcased by a U.S. Army soldier in 2006.

Land Warrior was a United States Army program, launched in 1989. It officially got its name in 1994, cancelled in 2007 but restarted in 2008. It has used a combination of commercial, off-the-shelf technology (COTS) and current-issue military gear and equipment designed to:

- integrate small arms with high-tech equipment;
- provide communications and command and control at the infantry soldier level;
- look at the individual infantry soldier as a complete unit rather than as a segment of a larger force.

While technology had long been a primary focus of the U.S. Armed Forces, very little of it had actually been adopted by the U.S. Army infantry soldier. With growing concerns of urban warfare and dismounted infantry actions, the U.S. Army recognized the need to upgrade an individual infantryman. The Land Warrior program drew upon many wearable computer concepts, and maximized existing technologies to correct most infantry soldier limitations in the short term.

The SI (Stryker Interoperable) version of the system completed U.S. Army testing as of November 2004. Due to limited resources, and issues with the overall weight of the system, Land Warrior was cancelled by the Army in February 2007, but restarted in July 2007. Despite the initial system's cancellation the 4th Stryker Brigade Combat Team (SBCT) was deployed to Iraq as part of the spring 2007 "surge" of U.S. forces, and used the Land Warrior, on which they had trained for the previous few years.

The systems and technology of the Land Warrior program were to be rolled into the Future Force Warrior program, and the Army has developed the Nett Warrior system to supersede Land Warrior as its next soldier network program.

Internationally, there are several similar development programs, these include IdZ (Germany), FIST (UK), Félin (France), Land 125 (Australia), MARKUS (Sweden), Soldato Futuro (Italy), IMESS (Switzerland), Projekt TYTAN (Poland), FINSAS (India) and ACMS (Singapore), Ratnik (Russia), SARV (Iran).

== History ==
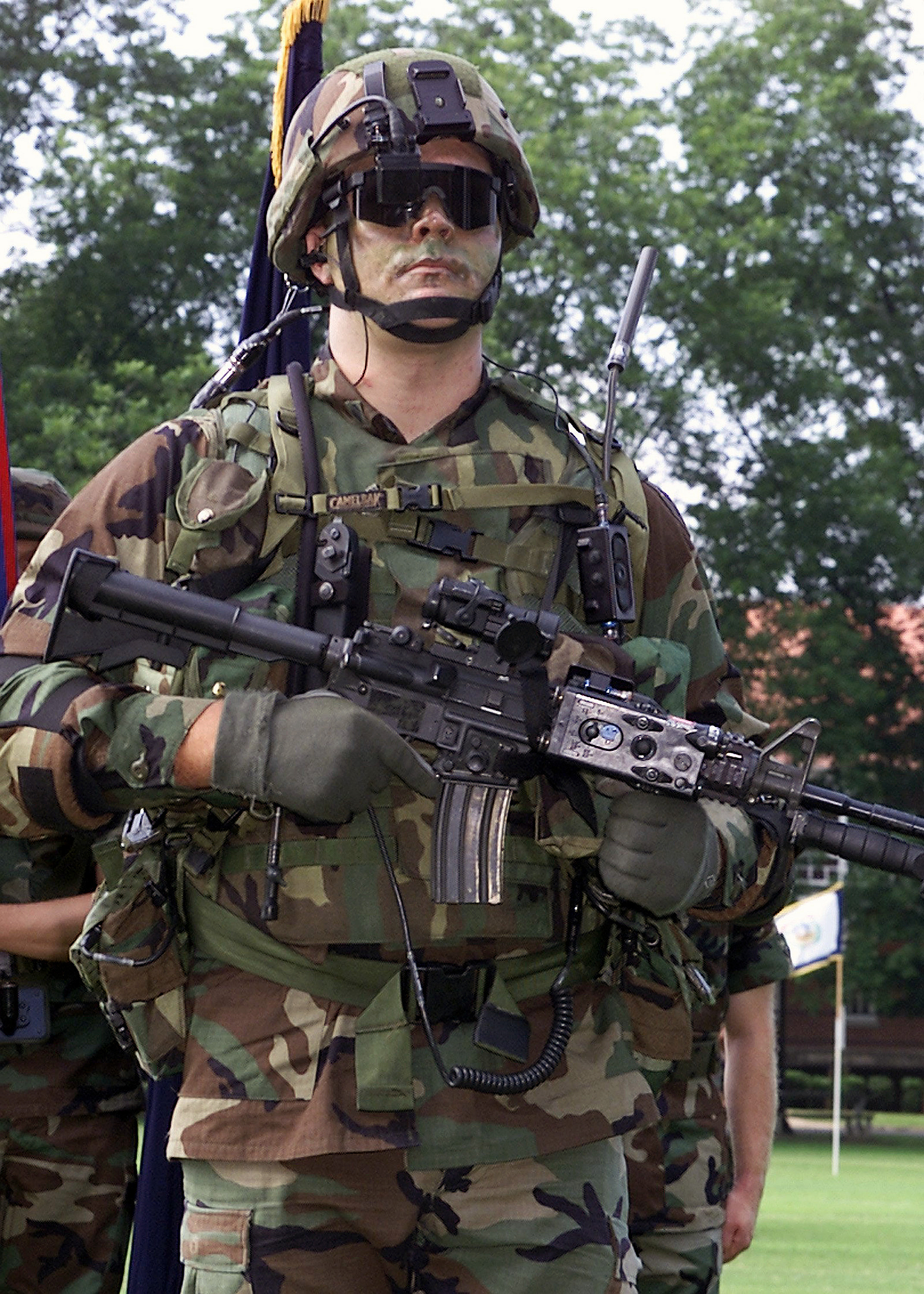
A U.S. Army soldier displays the 21st Century, Land Warrior, Integrated Fighting System at Fort McPherson, Georgia in June 2001. The system consists of a global positioning system, within a computer/radio subsystem.

The original Land Warrior program, under a different name, was undertaken by General Electric in Moorestown, New Jersey in approximately 1989, as a prototype having intent to eventually reduce size and weight in future phases.

The Land Warrior program emerged from the 1992 Soldier Integrated Protective Ensemble (SIPE) Advanced Technology Demonstration (ATD).

In August 1994, the name Land Warrior was adopted when the Commander, Aviation and Troop Command (ATCOM) approved the program. The program's item development was handled by a division of Hughes Aerospace, which was subsequently acquired by Raytheon. (The soldier radio component of Land Warrior was to be supplied by the Integrated Information Systems division of Motorola.)

Early demonstration versions of the LW system used software written in the Ada programming language running on a Unix platform.

In early spring 1996, the Generation II Soldier System Advanced Technology Demonstration (ATD) was merged with the Land Warrior program. In December 1996, the Land Warrior program completed a full-scale early operational experiment at Fort Benning, Georgia. The experiment was a squad-level exercise that employed 10 Land Warrior prototype systems. During the experiment, a series of individual and collective tasks were demonstrated.

The Land Warrior program's operational testing was initially scheduled to begin in the third quarter of fiscal year 1998 (from 1 April to 30 June 1998). Due to equipment problems encountered during developmental testing in April 1998, the program manager for Land Warrior halted further system development pending an overall program review.

Based on the results of the program review performed during fiscal year 1999 (1 October 1998 to 30 September 1999), the Program Manager for the Land Warrior System reduced efforts by halting contractor development of the Land Warrior-unique load carrying equipment and body armor, instead using government off-the-shelf items (i.e., early MOLLE equipment and Interceptor body armor), and, by increasing the system's reliance on contractor off-the-shelf electronics technology.

In January 1999, under the direction of Bruce D. Jette, an attempt was made to reduce development costs and accelerate the program, and the development work was transitioned to a multi-company team that had been organized by Exponent, Inc. (NASDAQ: EXPO), an engineering firm with headquarters in Silicon Valley.

An intensive redesign of the system ensued, and both the embedded firmware and the application software were rewritten from scratch. Many of the COTS hardware components were purchased (literally "off the shelf") at Fry's Electronics, a Silicon Valley–based retail chain. Approximately 100 proof-of-concept Land Warrior units were built and successfully demonstrated in September 2000 by a U.S. Army platoon that was air-dropped into a large war-fighting exercise at Fort Polk, Louisiana.

These initial prototype units, designated Land Warrior v0.6, were built around a PC/104 computer platform running Microsoft Windows. The system used the CAN-bus protocol on the wired PAN (personal area network). The communications subsystem was built using Windows CE running on a StrongARM platform, and the wireless network protocol was IEEE 802.11. During the Fort Polk exercise, preliminary interoperability with traditional military radio networks was also demonstrated for LW v0.6, using a two-way, SINCGARS-compatible gateway radio.

The success of the Fort Polk exercise reinvigorated the program, and further funding was allocated for the next phase of LW development. A "Land Warrior Consortium" was formed by several of the contracting firms, with the goal of designing and building the first field-able LW system, designated LW v1.0, later LW-IC (Land Warrior – Initial Capability). The basic Windows and WinCE platforms were retained, and a new hybrid PAN was designed, which drew upon both USB and FireWire protocols. A modified version of the IEEE 802.11 protocol was adopted, which added various enhancements for COMSEC and information security, mobile ad hoc network capabilities, and support for multi-hop packet routing.

In 2003, a variant of the LW-IC system was developed to incorporate features of the CombatID System (CIDS) – a form of IFF (identification friend or foe) that is designed to reduce the potential for friendly fire incidents. This version, designated LW-CIDS, was successfully demonstrated in interoperational tests with several other CIDS-equipped units at Moffett Field, California.

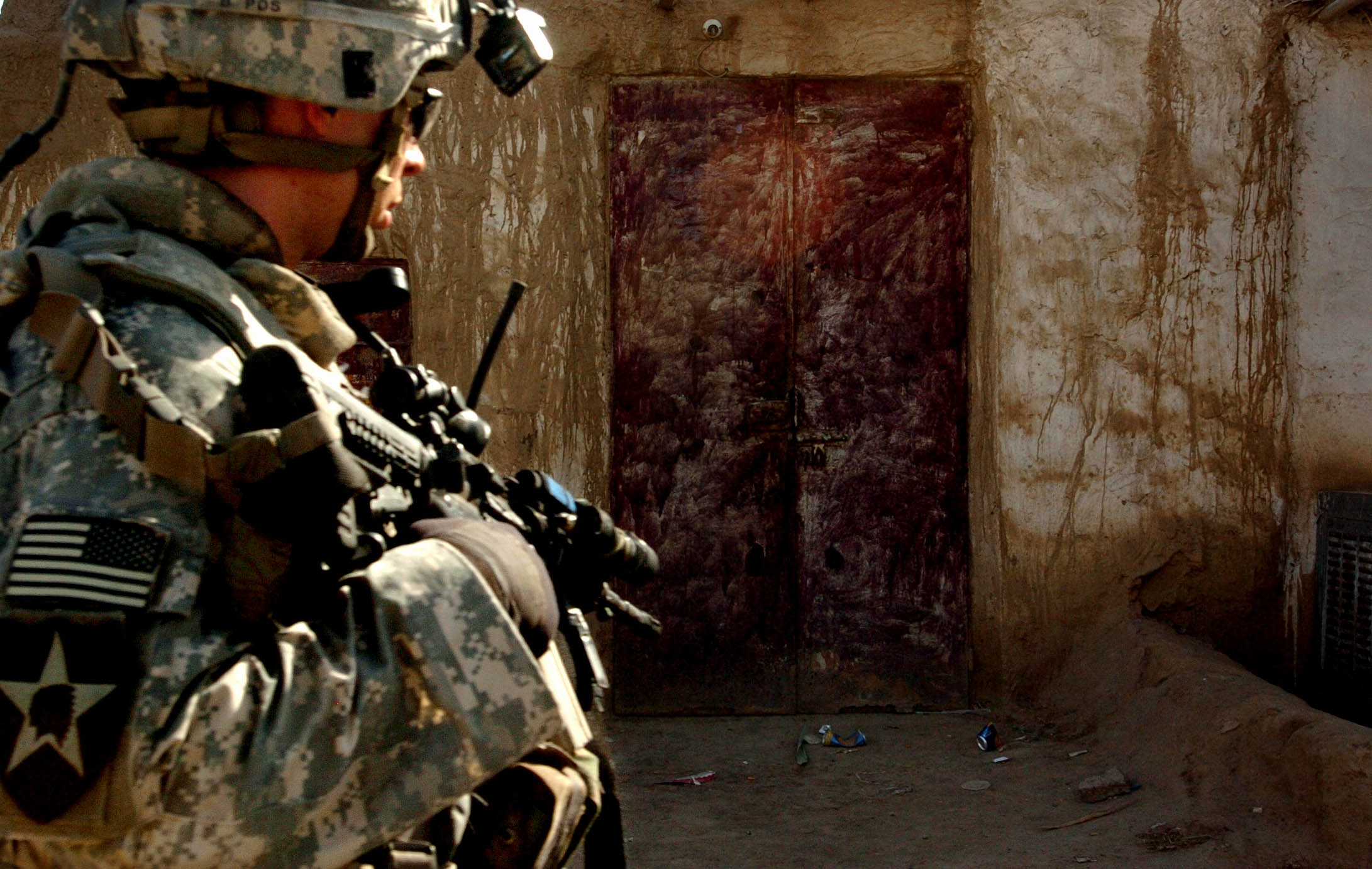
Land Warrior in use by a U.S. Army soldier from 4th Battalion, 9th Infantry in Iraq in July 2007.

As the Land Warrior program matured, it became clear that its successful deployment would hinge significantly upon the key factor of batteries. The need to continuously resupply (or recharge) LW batteries was proving to be a major logistical challenge. This was one of the driving factors behind the decision to move away from an earlier plan to initially equip airborne Army units, as in the Fort Polk exercise, and to focus instead upon those using Stryker ground vehicle systems. This latter approach would enable more LW batteries to be distributed and/or recharged as needed.

The contract for development of the Land Warrior – Stryker Interoperable (LW-SI) version of the system was awarded in 2003 to an industry team that was led by General Dynamics and included most of the existing Land Warrior Consortium companies. At about the same time, further development of the existing LW-IC system was halted and the manufacturing plans for it were shelved indefinitely. The Land Warrior Consortium was formally disbanded and work got under way on the newly focused LW-SI program.

In September 2006, the 4th Battalion, 9th Infantry Regiment trained with and evaluated the LW-SI system. The system successfully completed the assessment, which was based on Joint Capabilities Integration and Development System (JCIDS) guidance, and received testimonials from the unit. However, funding for further system development under the Land Warrior program was suspended in February 2007, and after a final contract to General Dynamics in 2009, further contracts for LW were not renewed. A decision was made in 2011 to continue some portions of the program under new initiatives; though these would eventually became defunct due to private industry developments (notably from Crye Precision) replicating much of the technology, and ultimately most component programs were cancelled.

== Description ==
The three priority objectives of Land Warrior were:

- Improving the lethality of an individual soldier
- Increasing the survivability of a soldier
- Providing full command, communications, and control to a soldier

Land Warrior had seven main subsystems:

- Weapon
- Integrated helmet assembly
- Protective clothing and equipment
- Computer
- Navigation
- Radio
- Software system

Later features of the Land Warrior system included:

- providing dismounted soldier combat identification for en route situational awareness and power recharge to reduce 'friendly fire' incidents
- Commander's Digital Assistant leader planning tool
- weight and power reduction
- scalability and tailorability for operational missions

=== Weapon ===
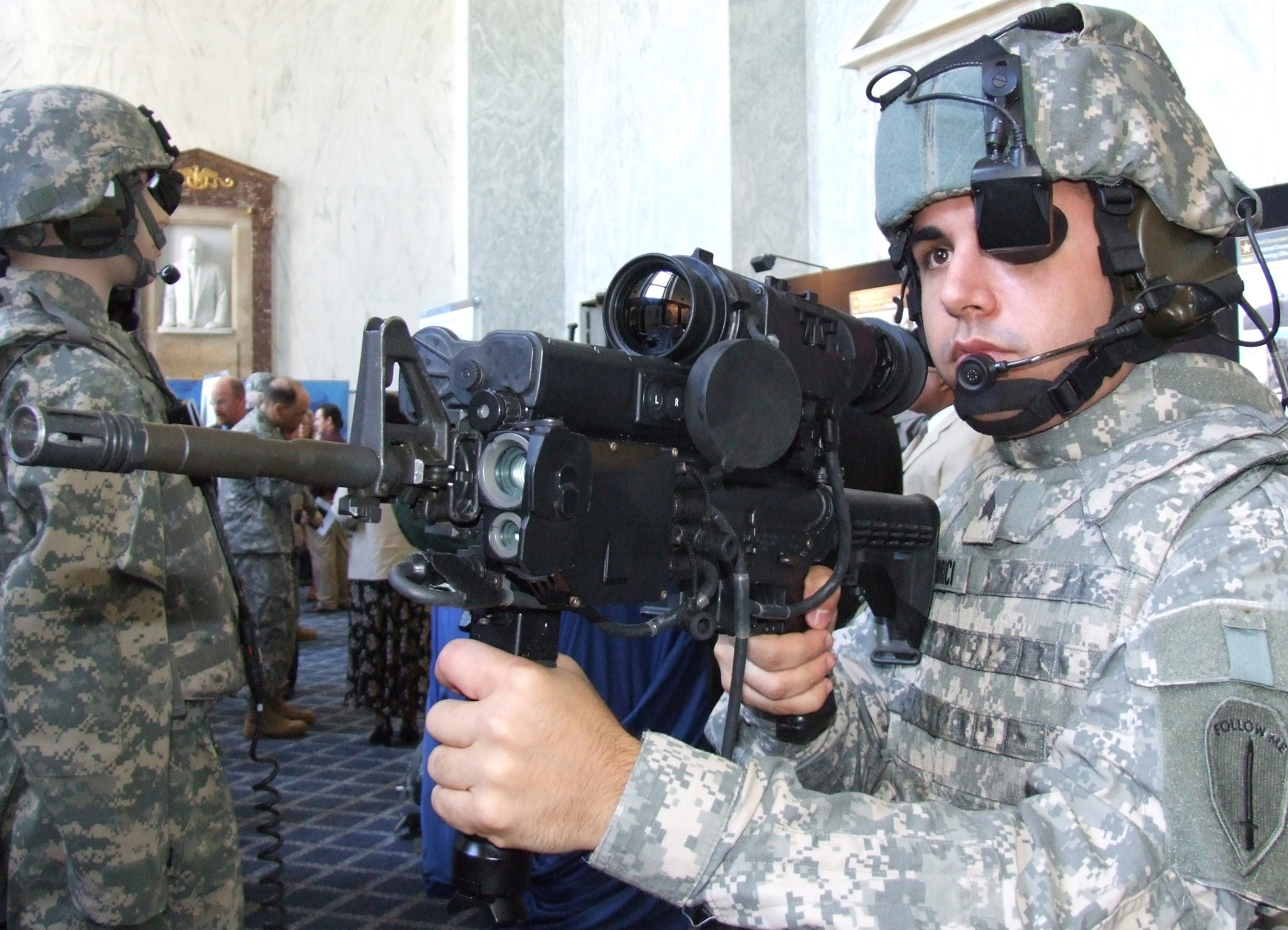
A U.S. Army soldier showcases Land Warrior at the Rayburn House Office Building in Washington, D.C. in June 2007.

The original system was built around the M16 rifle or M4 carbine, both with modular rail mounts to allow customization as needed for each mission. It included the weapon itself, plus components such as a daylight video sight, thermal weapons sight and MFL (Multi-Function Laser). The MFL provided range and direction information, as well as IR, visible, and MILES lasers, while the cameras provided a video feed and thermographic capabilities, plus allowing a soldier to shoot around corners or behind cover without actually exposing himself to enemy fire.

=== Helmet ===
The Helmet Subsystem (HSS) combined a lightweight advanced helmet with a microphone and headset, computer and OLED display that provided various information from digital maps and troop locations down to his weapon-mounted video camera. Combined with the aiming lasers, it would have allowed the soldier to aim (and fire) around corners.

=== Computer ===
The Computer Subsystem (CSS) provided the processing power and storage capacity for the system. The CSS is based around an ARM core processor. Prior to the project's cancellation (when project funds were moved to Hurricane Katrina relief) the computer used was Techsol's Ethernet Audio Interface board, powered by an s3c2410a processor from Samsung Semiconductor, featuring an ARM-920T core running at up to 200 MHz. The board included a low-power Ethernet interface using the cs8900a from Cirrus Logic, an audio interface using the internal IIS audio interface of the Samsung chip connected to an AKM integrated Audio Codec and Amplifier, a GPS receiver from Motorola, and using GPIOs for the push-buttons used for volume up/down, and also channel up/down. With a wide-voltage-range input power-supply, the entire wearable computer board was 2/3 the size of a business card (see photo).

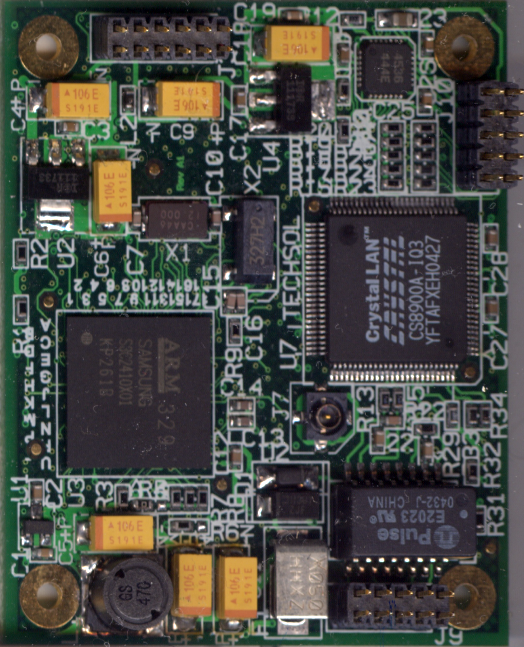
Techsol's "Ethernet Audio Interface" Computer board, with GPS

Future versions were powered by an XScale processor from Intel. The CSS connects to each one of the LRUs as well as to the batteries.

=== Navigation ===
The Navigation Subsystem (NSS) provided positional information. It integrated a GPS receiver and a Dead Reckoning Module (DRM) that maintains accurate location when Global Positioning System signal becomes unavailable.

=== Radio ===
The Communication Network Radio Subsystem (CNRS) provided communications capabilities for the Land Warrior. It was based on the Enhanced Position Location Reporting System.

=== Software ===
Land Warrior's software system was powered by a variant of the Linux operating system and had a modular, open architecture for further improvement. The Land Warrior software suite contained six main software packages for weapon sights and for data.

=== Fighting Load Vest ===
The Fighting Load Vest was used for carrying the various sensors and the computer. The vest could be adjusted while on the move and could carry the power system composed of batteries weighing up to 1.1kg (2.5lb).

== Later developments: GSS Increment 1 and Nett Warrior ==
229 Land Warrior ensembles were deployed by the 4th Battalion, 9th Infantry Regiment to Iraq from May 2007 to June 2008. A Stryker Brigade later deployed with the system to Afghanistan, and Land Warrior remained in use until spring 2012. The Army built upon Land Warrior with the Ground Soldier System (GSS) as its successor, an advanced dismounted soldier integrated situational awareness system that entered technology development in February 2009. GSS Increment 1 was renamed Nett Warrior in June 2010 after Medal of Honor recipient Robert B. Nett (although the term "Nett" has frequently been misinterpreted as a reflection of its tactical networking features). Nett Warrior was first demonstrated in spring 2011, which then was essentially the 10-pound Land Warrior ensemble with some enhanced additional software. Later iterations focused on a hand-held solution that integrated a commercial hand-held screen device with the Rifleman radio, simplifying the system and decreasing weight to 3 lb (1.4 kg). Nett Warrior utilizes enhanced smartphones, using different models over the course of its development including the Motorola Atrix, Samsung Galaxy Note I, and the Samsung Galaxy Note 2.

== See also ==
- Air Warrior
- Cognitive Technology Threat Warning System (CT2WS)
- Micropower
- MOLLE
- Interceptor Body Armor
- M4 carbine
- Nett Warrior, the United States' integrated situational awareness system
- Future Soldier, the multi-national Future Soldier project.
- Future Force Warrior, the United States Future Soldier program.
- IdZ, the German Bundeswehr Future Soldier project.
- IMESS, the Swiss Future Soldier program.
- FIST, the British analog to the Future Force Warrior program.
- FÉLIN, the French Future Soldier program.
- 21st Century soldier, the Czech Future Soldier project.
- F-INSAS, the Indian Futuristic soldier program.
- Projekt TYTAN, the Polish Future Soldier Program.
- ACMS, the Singaporean Future Soldier project.
- Ratnik (Ратник), Russia.
- Modernized Infantry Battalion Bangladesh
