= ACMS =

ACMS may refer to:

== Organizations ==
=== Middle schools ===
- Anne Chesnutt Middle School in Fayetteville, North Carolina
- Antelope Crossing Middle School in Antelope, California
- Arbor Creek Middle School in Carrollton, Texas
- Atlanta Charter Middle School in Atlanta, Georgia

=== Other educational institutions ===
- Allianze University College of Medical Sciences, in Kepala Batas, Pulau Pinang, Malaysia
- American Center for Mongolian Studies, an American Overseas Research Center (AORC) in Ulaanbaatar, Mongolia, and Philadelphia, PA
- Army College of Medical Sciences, New Delhi

=== Other organizations ===
- The Alternative Comedy Memorial Society, a British comedy night for alternative and experimental work
- American College of Mohs Surgery
- Association of Christians in the Mathematical Sciences
- Australian Computer Museum Society Inc., an Australian charitable institution

== Technology ==
- Advanced Combat Man System, the Singapore Armed Forces Future Soldier project
- Application Control Management System, a transaction processing management software
- Automatic channel memory system, by which a radio tuner can scan for and remember channels
