= Android Team Awareness Kit =

Geospatial app

Android Team Awareness Kit (ATAK)
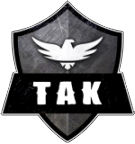
- ATAK-CIV logo

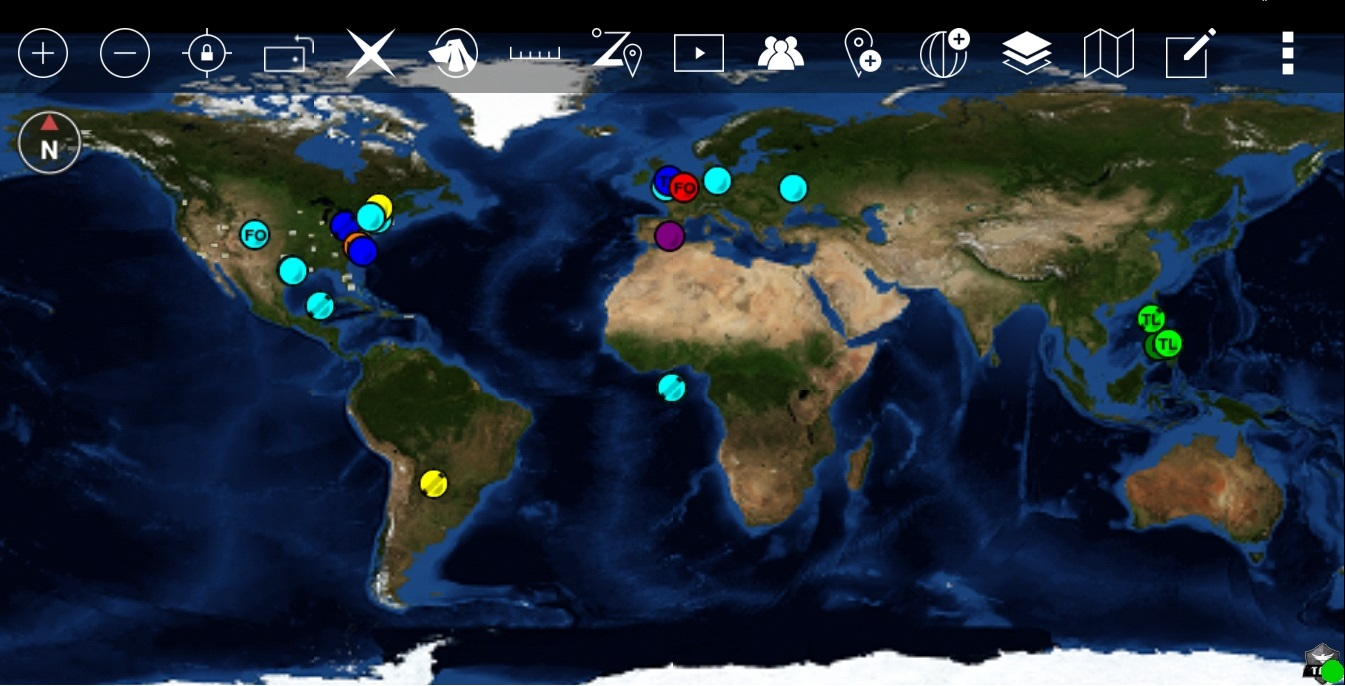
- ATAK 4.0.0.1-PR connected to a public TAKServer
- Developers: Air Force Research Laboratory & Maintained by the TAK Product Center
- Initial release: 2010; 16 years ago
- Stable release: 5.2.0 (TAK.gov) / 18 July 2024; 22 months ago
- Written in: Java, C, C++
- Operating system: Android
- Available in: Multilingual
- Type: Situational Awareness Software
- License: Government off-the-shelf
- Website: tak.gov

TAK Server
- Logo of TAKServer
- Developers: Raytheon BBN Technologies & Maintained by the TAK Product Center
- Stable release: 5.2 / 11 July 2024; 22 months ago
- Written in: Java
- License: Government off-the-shelf
- Website: tak.gov/products/tak-server

Android Team Awareness Kit (ATAK, also as Android Tactical Assault Kit, and Android Tactical Assault Kit for Civilian Use, ATAK-CIV) is an Android smartphone geospatial infrastructure and military situation awareness app. It allows for precision targeting, surrounding land formation intelligence, situational awareness, navigation, and data sharing. This Android app is a part of the larger TAK family of products. ATAK has a plugin architecture which allows developers to add functionality. This extensible plugin architecture that allows enhanced capabilities for specific mission sets (Direct Action, Combat Advising, Law Enforcement, Protection Operations, Border Security, Disaster Response, Off-grid Communications, Precision Mapping and Geotagging).

It enables users to navigate using GPS and geospatial map data overlaid with real-time situational awareness of ongoing events. The ATAK software represents the surrounding area using the military standard APP-6 symbology, and customized symbols such as icons from Google Earth and Google Maps for iconography and the Cursor on Target data format standard for communication.

Initially created in 2010 by the Air Force Research Laboratory, and based on the NASA WorldWind Mobile codebase its development and deployment grew slowly, then rapidly since 2016.

As of 2020, ATAK has a growing base of 250,000 military and civilian users across numerous public safety agencies and US partner nations, and has seen the addition of 15 United States Department of Defense programs.

== Development and usage ==
ATAK began in August 2010 and was originally based on NASA WorldWind Mobile. The goal was to demonstrate robust information sharing in a mobile format.

In 2013, officials at Draper Laboratory said that the system would be compatible with Android mobile operating systems and could be used for navigation, spatial awareness, and controlling drones.

On October 14, 2014, U.S. Army Geospatial Center recommended AFRL's Android Team Awareness Kit (ATAK), over the world-leader Esri's Commercial Joint Mapping Tool Kit (CJMTK), NASA's World Wind, and the Army's Globe Engine (AGE) for map engine driving the Nett Warrior End User Device. ATAK was selected due to similar capabilities with CJMTK, similar risk, and less than one-third of the total cost.

According to a January 2016 article in National Defense Magazine, "[ATAK] has already been fielded to AFSOC units".

In September 2015, DARPA reported that ATAK was used in a successful demonstration of the Persistent Close Air Support Program, and is in use by thousands of users.

Polaris integrated its Ground Guidance software into an ATAK Plugin to allow on and off-road routing for mounted and dismounted soldiers, accounting for terrain, weather, enemy activity and equipment load.

In 2018, USAF Security Forces deployed ATAK at Eglin AFB, Florida.

The Android Team Awareness Kit or TAK is currently used by thousands of Department of Homeland Security personnel, along with other members of the Homeland Security Enterprise including state and local public safety personnel. It is in various stages of transition across DHS components and is the emerging DHS-wide solution for tactical awareness.

TAK has supported the rescue of over 2,000 people during disaster response for seven major hurricanes (Harvey, Irma, Maria, Florence, Lane, Michael, and Dorian). The capability is also regularly used during daily public safety operations and national security special events like United Nations General Assembly meetings and the Super Bowl.

== ATAK versions ==
ATAK has various end-user versions:

- ATAK - Civilian (ATAK-CIV) - A distribution controlled but fully-releasable version of the TAK Product line for First Responders, Licensed Commercial Developers. Distribution for ATAK-CIV is through Approved, Government Hosted Sites, Direct Commercial Sales (DCS). This version has no ITAR capabilities.
- ATAK - Government (ATAK-GOV) - ITAR restricted version of the TAK Product line for USG entities and Foreign Government. Distribution for ATAK-GOV are through Approved, Government Hosted Sites; Direct Commercial Sales (DCS). This version of ATAK has no military (MIL) sensitive capabilities.
- ATAK - Military (ATAK-MIL) - Military Sensitive version of the TAK Product line for US and Foreign Military end-users. Similar to ATAK-GOV, distribution is through Approved, Government Hosted Sites. However, is not available through Direct Commercial Sales (DCS).
- ATAK - Public Release (ATAK-PR) - (Discontinued) Was made available for download on takmaps.com in April 2020. ATAK-PR is publicly releasable version of the TAK Product line for public individuals for public uses. This version of ATAK is not plugin capable. And is only compatible with arm64 based systems due to file size restrictions. End users with armeabi-v7a or x86 devices are to use ATAK-CIV.
- ATAK - FVEY "Five Eyes" (ATAK-FVEY)

=== ATAK-CIV ===
On September 1, 2020 - the TAK Product Center released ATAK-CIV (Android Team Awareness Kit - Civil Use) - Version 4.1.1.0 on Google Play Store.

=== Other versions ===
In addition to the Android version, there is also a Microsoft Windows version (WinTAK), and an Apple iOS version (iTAK). WinTAK is an application developed for the Microsoft Windows Operating System which uses maps to allow for precise targeting, intelligence on surrounding land formations, navigation, and generalized situational awareness. It was developed in conjunction with ATAK to provide similar functionality on a Windows platform.

== Commercial licensing ==
In January 2015, AFRL began licensing ATAK through TechLink to U.S. companies, for commercial use to support state/local government uses as well as civilian uses. As of January 2020, one hundred companies have licensed ATAK for commercial uses. Corona Fire Department is one example of a local public safety agency using ATAK. Corona uses PAR Government's Team Connect platform to leverage ATAK. In civilian use, ATAK is often referred to as Android Team Awareness Kit.

Android Team Awareness Kit (ATAK) Licensing for Tech Transfer & Tech Transition. Briefing. DISTRIBUTION STATEMENT A: Approved for Public Release, Case Number 88ABW-2014-1324

=== Federal Government release ===
As of March 31, 2020, the civilian version of ATAK, referred to as CivTAK has been approved for "Public Release" by Army Night Vision and is available for download on takmaps.com and subsequently named Android Team Awareness Kit (ATAK) - Civilian.

=== License grant ===
Upon running ATAK-PR 4.0.0.1, the application splash screen shows a statement; "Approved for public release; distribution is unlimited.". The license conditions are detailed in the ATAK Software License Agreement found in the Support menu of ATAK.

ATAK PR OBJECT CODE LICENSE GRANT: YOU ARE GRANTED A PERPETUAL, NON-EXCLUSIVE, NO-CHARGE, ROYALTY-FREE RIGHT TO USE, COPY, PUBLISH, AND/OR DISTRIBUTE THE ATAK PR SOFTWARE IN OBJECT CODE FORMAT, AND TO PERMIT PERSONS TO WHOM THE SOFTWARE IS FURNISHED TO DO SO. YOU ARE NOT PERMITTED TO SELL, REVERSE ENGINEER, DISASSEMBLE, OR DECOMPILE THE ATAK PR SOFTWARE, OR TO PERMIT OTHERS TO DO SO. EXCEPT AS EXPRESSLY STATED HEREIN, THIS AGREEMENT DOES NOT GRANT YOU ANY INTELLECTUAL PROPERTY RIGHTS IN THE SOFTWARE AND ALL RIGHTS NOT EXPRESSLY GRANTED ARE RESERVED BY THE GOVERNMENT AND/OR THE COPYRIGHT OWNER. IF YOU PUBLISH AND/OR DISTRIBUTE THE ATAK PR SOFTWARE, YOU SHALL PROVIDE A COPY OF THIS AGREEMENT AND CORRESPONDING THIRD PARTY LICENSE NOTICES TO THE RECIPIENT OF THE ATAK PR SOFTWARE; YOU ARE NOT PERMITTED TO ALTER THE TERMS AND CONDITIONS OF THIS AGREEMENT.

— Android Team Awareness Kit - Public Release (4.0.0.1) LICENSE.txt

=== Open source ===
On August 19, 2020, the source code for the Android Tactical Assault Kit for Civilian Use (ATAK-CIV), the official geospatial-temporal and situational awareness tool used by the US Government, has been released on United States Department of Defense - Defense Digital Service GitHub repository. ATAK-CIV is managed by the Tactical Assault Kit Configuration Steering Board (TAK CSB) and is designed for used by (US) federal employees.

It is made available to the open source community with the hope that community contributions will improve functionality, add features, and mature this work.

== Users ==
=== Americas ===
- United States
  - Military
    - United States Special Operations Command
    - United States Army
      - United States Army Special Operations Command
    - United States Air Force
    - United States National Guard
    - United States Navy and United States Marine Corps(primarily use APASS and KILSWITCH but instances of ATAK use seen as of 2021)
    - United States Coast Guard
  - Law Enforcement and Emergency Services
    - United States Department of Homeland Security
    - United States Secret Service
    - Federal Bureau of Investigation
    - U.S. Customs and Border Protection
    - Immigration and Customs Enforcement
    - Federal Emergency Management Agency
    - Albuquerque Fire Rescue
    - Colorado Department of Public Safety
      - Division of Fire Prevention and Control, Center of Excellence for Advanced Technology Aerial Firefighting (CoE)
    - Corona Fire Department
    - New York City Police Department
- Canada
  - Royal Canadian Mounted Police
    - Emergency Response Team
  - Canadian Armed Forces
    - Canadian Army

=== Europe ===
- United Kingdom
  - British Army
    - Special Air Service
    - Special Reconnaissance Regiment
    - Special Forces Support Group
    - Pathfinder Platoon
    - Ranger Regiment
    - 4/73 (Sphinx) Special Observation Post Battery RA
    - The Black Watch
    - The Royal Regiment of Scotland
    - 1st The Queen's Dragoon Guards
  - Royal Navy
    - Special Boat Service
    - Royal Marines
- Poland
  - Polish Army
  - Territorial Defence Force

=== Asia ===
- Philippines
  - Philippine National Police
    - JTF CoViD Shield
