= Idz =

Idz or IDZ is a three-letter initialism or abbreviation which may refer to:

== Music ==
- "Ijime, Dame, Zettai", a single by Babymetal, or three editions ("I", "D", "Z") of said single.
- Live: Legend I, D, Z Apocalypse, a live video album by Babymetal

== Other uses ==
- Infanterist der Zukunft, a German fighting system
