= Air War (disambiguation) =

"Air War" is a 2007 single by Crystal Castles.

Air War may also refer to:

- Air War (film), a 2023 Israeli action drama
- Air War (game), a 1977 board game
- Aerial warfare, the use of military aircraft and other flying machines in warfare

== See also ==
- Air Warrior (disambiguation)
