= Rheinmetall Algeria =

Rheinmetall Algeria SPA
- Industry: Automotive, Defence
- Founded: March 2011
- Headquarters: Constantine, Algeria
- Key people: Chouaki Rachid (CEO and chairman of the executive board)
- Products: Automotive parts, military vehicles and systems

Rheinmetall Algeria is a manufacturer of military vehicles based in Constantine, Algeria.

== History ==
In March 2011 two German defense companies, Rheinmetall and Ferrostaal, joined with the Algerian government-sponsored defense-related automotive development agency EDIV to form Rheinmetall Algeria. The new company was based in Ain Smara near Constantine, Algeria. EDIV has an ownership stake of 51% of the shares, the Emirati investment fund Aabar controls 24.5%, Ferrostaal 19.5%, and technological partner Rheinmetall 5%.

The company's goal was to build a production facility for the manufacture of Fuchs armored transport vehicles, with a production goal of 1200 vehicles within ten years. Some key components are imported from Germany.

== Models ==
- Fuchs II 6×6, the Algerian Fuchs will be equipped with engines manufactured by MTU in Oued Hmimine Constantine.
- Boxer 8×8, Algeria has been interested in Boxer since 2015 just after the launch of the production of Fuch 2. In 2015, the ANP ( Armée Nationale Populaire) received a test copy that will make the parade on January 31, 2018, under the eyes of the Algerian CHOD Algeria could reach 500 units by 2023, the Algerian Boxers will be equipped same as the previous Fuchs with engines manufactured by MTU in Oued Hmimine Constantine.
- Gladius 2.0 (IdZ-ES) Future Soldier – Extended System and Argus, both modular systems that reduce the burden on the foot soldier while enhancing overall capability
