= Nett Warrior =

United States Army situational awareness system

Nett Warrior (NW) (formerly known as the Ground Soldier System) is an integrated dismounted leader situational awareness (SA) system for use during combat operations of the United States Army.

== Overview ==
The Nett Warrior system provides SA to the dismounted leader with the aim of enabling faster and more accurate decisions in the tactical fight. The system includes navigation, SA and information sharing capabilities. Its goal is to enable leaders to avoid fratricide and increase effectiveness of combat mission execution.

The NW program focuses on the development of the SA system. This includes a digital, graphical display of the leader’s location on a digital geo-referenced map image along with soldier and leader locations. The display is hands-free. The software connects through a secure radio to send and receive information from one NW to another, connecting the dismounted leader to the network. The radio also connected the equipped leader to higher echelon data and information products. Soldier position location information is provided via interoperability with the Army’s Rifleman Radio capability.

NW employs a system-of-systems approach, optimizing and integrating capabilities while reducing the soldier’s combat load and logistical footprint.

By mid-2017, Nett Warrior was being upgraded and tested to receive full-motion video streams from small unmanned ground vehicles and unmanned aerial vehicles.

== History ==
Nett Warrior followed the Land Warrior system, which was deployed to Iraq in the spring of 2007 and then later to Afghanistan after the program had been cut in Army budgets. Land Warrior allowed combat leaders to track the locations of their men and view maps and other tactical information through a small helmet-mounted computer screen, featured a microcomputer processor for storing maps, mission-specific imagery, and graphics, used a navigation system to track the subordinate leaders' positions which appeared as icons on a digital map, and had a digital voice and text radio to send e-mails and talk to others wearing the system. Originally named the Ground Soldier System, its name was changed to Nett Warrior on 14 June 2010 (also the Army's 235th birthday) after then-lieutenant Robert B. Nett who was awarded the Medal of Honor in 1944 during World War II. The name was chosen because the system is designed to connect soldiers with the Army's tactical network, and program officials wanted it to be named after a maneuver leader.

The first increment of Nett Warrior was introduced at the Network Integration Evaluation 11.2 assessment in spring 2011. The system was essentially the Land Warrior ensemble with enhanced software, sharing its weight disadvantage of about 10 lb (4.5 kg). After NIE 11.2, efforts were redirected to using simpler and lighter commercial off-the-shelf (COTS) hand-held solutions that integrated a hand-held screen device with the Rifleman radio transport mechanism. The new design weighed less than 3 lb (1.4 kg) and participated in the NIE 12.1 assessment in November 2011. Nett Warrior is based on an “end user device,” essentially an Android or iPhone-like smartphone tied to the Rifleman handheld radio, to link into command-and-control networks and use applications to call in fire support, plan and coordinate operations, and track friendly forces. The iteration used during the exercise performed poorly, with the tracking system to locate friendly forces giving the wrong location (sometimes troops next to each other were shown kilometers apart) and the digital interpreter not recognizing specific foreign dialects and slang words. Connection to the Army network dropped out repeatedly, leaving soldiers out of contact with other parts of the unit, and when it was online the bandwidth was so restricted that they had to wait minutes before apps would start working. Some soldiers commented that it was so flawed that it might get people wounded or killed in the field. The criticism was expected and used to progress Nett Warrior, as NIEs are used to identify flaws in systems before they are fielded. One source of the complaints was attributed to soldiers having high expectations that weren't met because they compared the system to the performance of their own smartphone devices.

By mid-2012, Nett Warrior had recovered from the 10-pound Ground Soldier System's requirement overreach and cost spiraling to survive with the use of smartphones mounted inside the chest of a soldier's vest and connected to Rifleman radios on their backs. Having the phones on their chests was more comfortable and preferred to previous versions that were connected to their wrists with wires running down their arms. The phones can't make calls, but are used to see other soldiers’ positions, mark IED and enemy troop positions, and even text each other. The smartphone used was the Motorola Atrix, which helped users due to their familiarity with commercial devices. Army leaders exclusively run the phones on the Android operating system because of its open architecture. The Army plans to field 600 Nett Warrior systems in each Infantry Brigade Combat Team to be worn by squad leaders. This will give squads access to Blue Force Tracking and connect them to the Tactical Ground Reporting (TIGR) system to report what they see in the field, like enemy positions, biometrics, and weapons caches. Problems with using the Atrix smartphone included low-resolution and glaring screens and a low battery life of 3–4 hours.

In July 2013, the Army installed the Samsung Galaxy Note II into Nett Warrior as the system's end user device. Each Galaxy is bought at the commercial price of $700 per phone, substantially lower than if the Army had to procure devices from contractors who would develop their own original devices. Once acquired, the phones have their commercial features including cellular antennas, Wi-Fi, and Bluetooth wiped out by Army engineers, and the Nett Warrior software is installed on the National Security Agency-approved Android operating system. The smartphones communicate through a USB connection with the hip-mounted, data-capable Rifleman radio for network connectivity. Because commercial products are being bought, a new smartphone will need to be acquired once the Note II production stops. Nett Warrior is currently fielded by the U.S. Army Rangers and members of the 10th Mountain Division.

On 14 October 2014, the U.S. Army Geospatial Center recommended AFRL's Android Tactical Assault Kit (ATAK), over the world-leader Esri's Commercial Joint Mapping Tool Kit (CJMTK), NASA's World Wind, and the Army's Globe Engine (AGE) for map engine driving the Nett Warrior End User Device. ATAK was selected due to similar capabilities with CJMTK, similar risk, and less than one-third the total cost. The Army's FY 2016 budget includes funding to field Nett Warrior in three brigade combat teams, increasing information and situational awareness for dismounted platoon, squad, and team leaders. While the hardware has reached an acceptable level of robustness and readiness for fielding, the software and apps will continue to be improved.

== See also ==
- Future Force Warrior
