= F-INSAS =

Indian Army modernization program for infantry equipment

F-INSAS is India's programme to equip its infantry with state-of-the-art equipment, F-INSAS stands for Future Infantry Soldier As a System. In the first phase, to be completed by 2015, the infantry soldier will be equipped with a modular weapon system that will have multiple functions. The Indian Army intends to modernize its entire infantry and paramilitary battalions by 2020 with this program. However, the Indian Army has decided to drop the F-INSAS program in favour of two separate projects. The new program will have two components: one to arm the future infantry soldier with the best available assault rifle, carbines, and personal equipment, such as helmets and bulletproof vests. The second component is the Battlefield Management Systems (BMS). NATO similar combat systems are made in India by MKU (company).

== The F-INSAS program ==
F-INSAS has been taken up to equip the Indian infantry with advanced weaponry, a communication network, and instant access to information on the battlefield, conceived in 1994. This program is similar to the future soldier programs of other nations. F-INSAS includes a fully networked all-terrain, all-weather personal-equipment platform, enhanced firepower, and mobility for the digitalised battlefield of the future. The weight carried by soldiers will need to be reduced by at least 50%. The fully integrated Infantry of tomorrow will be equipped with mission-oriented equipment integrated with his buddy soldier team, the sub-unit, as also the overall C4ISTAR represents C4 (command, control, communications, computers) and ISTAR (intelligence, surveillance, target acquisition, and reconnaissance) system. On 16 August 2022, defence minister Rajnath Singh handed over F-INSAS to Army Chief General Manoj Pande. The intention is to equip the soldiers to ensure a dramatic increase in his lethality, survivability and mobility while making the soldier "a self-contained fighting machine".

== Core systems ==
=== Accessories ===
The soldier will be equipped with a USB 2.0 digital data bus, Palmtop IRNSS/GPS navigation device, secured advanced audio communication set, advanced electronic warfare data manager, and secured network connection where each radio can subscribe to two networks simultaneously. This offers the squad leader some flexibility in organizing communication networks in his section. Each network has an audio conference channel, with priority given to the squad leader, an alert channel from the infantryman to his leader, and a data transmission channel. Voice and data transmissions are based on tried and tested civilian technology (domestic cordless telephone technology). Each sub-network works from a base carried by the squad leader. As RIF sets are all identical, a soldier can replace his commander if necessary by configuring his set as a base. The radio is configured by the computer, thereby limiting the number of control buttons needed on the set. The soldier might be able to communicate with other soldiers and locate or generate maps to find his location, and he will be aware of the situation on the battlefield. The palmtop will inform soldiers where other friendly forces are in relation to them. It will also enable them to transfer messages. Terrain equipment for various specific missions will also be carried. Integrated Multifunction Sight Device Night Vision Equipment, Thermal Imager, a Laser Range-Finder, Colour Charge-Coupled-Device (CCD) Camera, an Indian Regional Navigation Satellite System (IRNSS) device and a Digital Magnetic Compass, Compact Laser-Based Instruments, Integrated Electro-Optical Surveillance and Fire Control Systems, Advanced IRNSS/GPS receivers, Infrared sensors, Thermal sensors, Electro optical sensors, Spectroscopic sensors, Electromagnetic and Radio frequency sensors and many other sensors, radars and jammers would also be carried.

=== Clothing ===
The personal clothing of this soldier of the future would be lightweight with a level IV bulletproof jacket. The jacket would be non-flammable, water-proofed yet breathable (flexible ballistic protection, hard ballistic protection, electronic jacket, load-bearing structure). The new attire will enable him to carry extra loads and resist the impact of nuclear, radiological, chemical, and biological (NRCB) warfare. The uniform will also carry solar elements for charging palm-top computers and other attached electronic equipment. It will contain an external oxygen supply and respirator to protect against gas and smoke, and will include fire-proof knee and elbow pads, hand gloves, and ballistic & laser eye protection goggles. A bullet-proof, armoured waistcoat including flexible ballistic, hard ballistic, ceramic armor plates covering the front, back, and groin, and an armoured, electronic jacket with a load-bearing system will also be included. The electronic jacket integrates the electronics (such as a computer unit, energy manager unit, peripheral equipment interfaces, user interfaces, a radio, a man-machine interface, an Indian Regional Navigation Satellite System (IRNSS a.k.a. Navigation with Indian Constellation-NAVIC) device, cables, connectors, camouflaging system, wearable environmental control, and a micro-climate heating & cooling system). A flexible water bottle, magazines, grenades, and other equipment holders and pockets optimise weight distribution on the soldier. The new uniform will have vests with sensors to monitor the soldier's health parameters and provide quick medical relief. He might also wear flame-resistant, moisture-defeating undergarments; flame-resistant hand, face, and foot protection, and a pair of non-skid shoes with mine & explosive detection sensors would complete the ensemble. The system also includes an in-built water purifier system so that they have purified drinking water.

=== Helmet and visor ===
The helmet is a Level-IV bulletproof helmet and is capable of stopping a 9mm round at close range, providing facial protection, ballistic and laser eye protection, and flame-resistant eye & face protection. The visor will contain a mounted flashlight, thermal sensors, advanced night vision capability, a digital compass, a shoulder video camera, a computer, nuclear, biological, and chemical sensors, and an audio headset. The visor is intended to be integrated and to act as a heads-up display monitor equivalent to two 17-inch computer monitors.

=== Weapons ===
The weapons sub-system is built around a multi-calibre individual weapon system with the fourth calibre attached to a grenade launcher. These include a 5.56 mm, a 7.62 mm, and a new 6.8 mm under development for the first time in India. The UBGL (Under Barrel Grenade Launcher) will be capable of firing air-bursting grenades. The sub-system includes a thermal weapon sight and laser range finder to provide the soldier with range and direction information. The IRNSS (similar to GPS or GLONASS) location information will allow the soldier to call for indirect fire accurately. There are two types of next-generation infantry rifles under development in cooperation with Israel. In this context, news sources report that the Indian MoD has recently issued a global tender for the acquisition of a new assault rifle and a Close Quarter Battle (CQB) carbine. In DEFXPO 2014, a prototype of the ARDE-DRDO MCIWS (Multi Caliber Individual Weapon System) was showcased. It is lighter than the existing INSAS rifles in the Indian Armed Forces, weighing only 3 kg. It features a UBGL (Under Barrel Grenade Launcher) as well as thermal sights or plain holographic sights & Red dot sights. The laser target has multiple Picatinny rails to facilitate various add-on equipment needed for various missions and thus improving versatility. And many other terrain, operation & mission-based weapons as per requirement.

== Procurements for program ==
Procurement requests for the 'open calibre' carbine valued at around ₹44 billion (US$456.9 million) have been initiated with global manufacturers. The procurement covers night-vision devices, laser designators, and detachable under-barrel grenade launchers.

== Program Indigenisation ==
With the intent to retain its strategic autonomy, self-reliance, and indigenisation of the program is being emphasised. Most of the equipment is being locally developed by the Defence Research and Development Organisation (DRDO) and the Ordnance Factories Board as the prime developer and the system integrator, respectively.

1. Design and development of a multi-calibre individual weapon system.
2. Design and development of an air-bursting grenade for individual weapons.

== Program split ==
In January 2015, the then Vice Chief of the Army Staff, Lieutenant General Philip Campose, reported that the Indian Army has split the F-INSAS program in favour of two separate projects. The new program will have two components: one arming the modern infantry soldier with the best available assault rifle, carbines, and personal equipment such as the helmet and bulletproof vests, and the second component is the Battlefield Management Systems (BMS).

== See also ==
- DRDO
- Ordnance Factories Board
- Future Soldier
- Indian Armed Forces
