= Air Warrior =

Air Warrior may refer to:

- Air Warrior (video game), a 1987 online combat flight simulation game
- Air Warrior (U.S. Army), an aircrew ensemble
