= Infantryman 2000 =

1984 British future soldier concept

The Infantryman 2000 was a future soldier concept developed by Scicon Limited in 1984 intended to be used by the British Army in the year 2000. The project was cancelled before it could advance beyond prototype stages.

== Equipment ==
=== Helmet ===
The helmet had a tinted screen with an internal head up display, laser rangefinder and an infrared camera to give 360 degrees vision, internal speaker/radio and filtration equipment.

=== Suit ===
The suit had an internal heating system to regulate the body temperature. It was also thick enough to withstand toxic agents, but able to give an equal sense of touch to the soldiers own skin. The boots had microwave sensing devices to detect landmines.

=== Backpack ===
The backpack had a high speed computer connected to the helmet, boots, programming pad, gloves and weapon. Also the backpack has twin ground to air launchers.

=== Weapon ===
The weapon was intended as a 4.7mm caseless/10mm grenade launching rifle with an offset handle/scope. There are some reports two functioning prototypes were completed apart from the PR & ergonomic handling mockups.

== See also ==
- Future Soldier 2030 Initiative
- Ratnik (program)
- Supersoldier
