= Army Aircrew Combat Uniform =

Type of helicopter flight suit

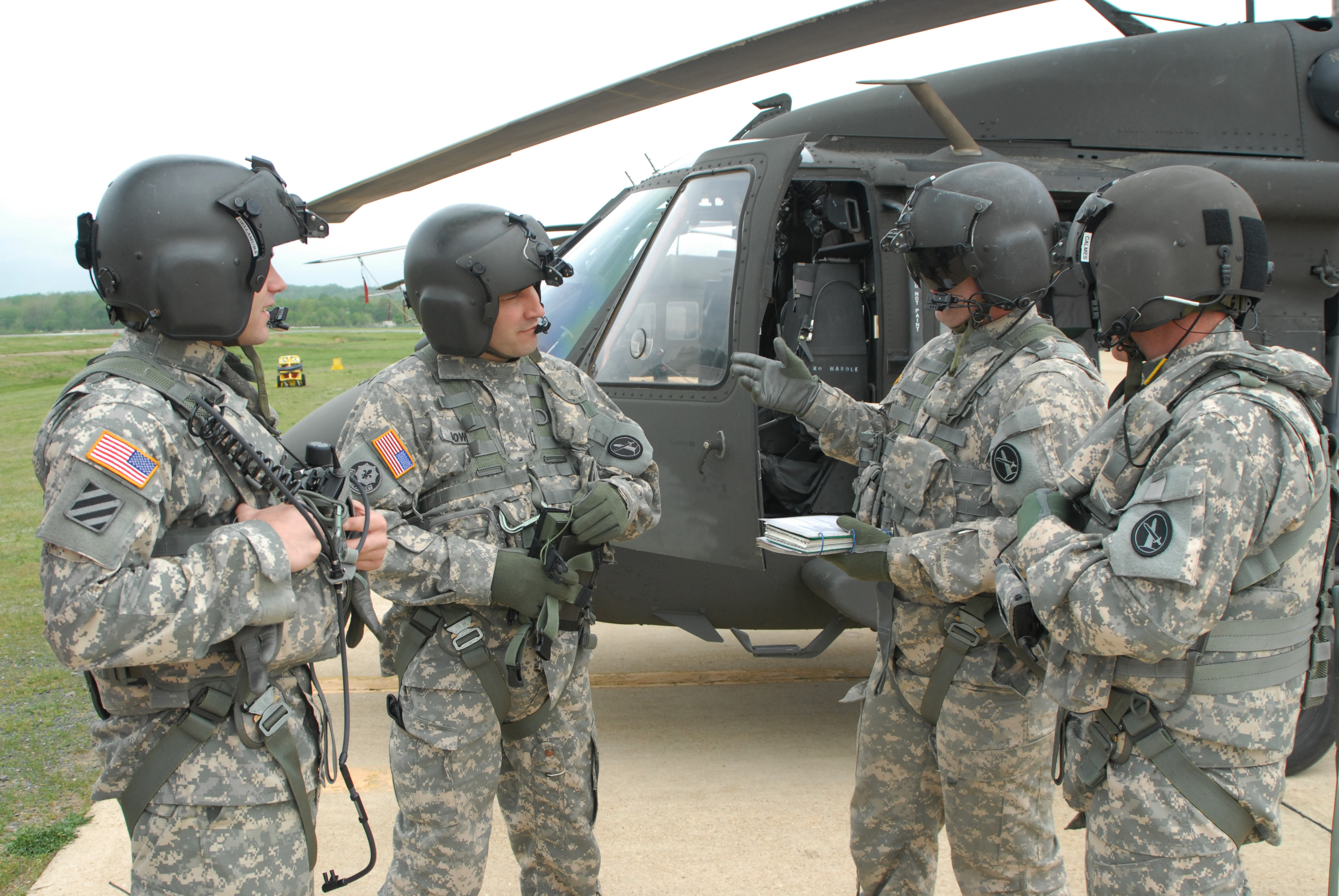
U.S. Army soldiers wearing the Army Aircrew Combat Uniform in August 2009.

The Army Aircrew Combat Uniform (A2CU) is a two-piece flight suit formerly in the Universal Camouflage Pattern, but now Operational Camouflage Pattern that offers the soldier protection from flash fires. The coat is similar to the ACU in design, with a stand-up collar featuring a front extension, shoulder patches, a front zipper, two inside hanging chest pockets with flaps; adjustable waist; two-piece set-in sleeves with elbow patches; two sleeve utility pockets with flaps and Identification Friend or Foe (IFF) tabs; and two lower sleeve pencil pockets with flaps. It can be worn with the Air Warrior Microclimate Cooling Vest. The trousers have nine pockets: two thigh pockets; two calf pockets with external tool pockets; one knife pocket with lanyard (on the left thigh); and two side hanging pockets. Pockets (except for the side hanging pockets and the lower leg external tool pockets) have flaps and zippers.

The A2CU upgrades the current Improved Aviation Battle Dress Uniform protective clothing system and provides operational effectiveness, fit, suitability, and durability, addressing near-term Air Warrior requirements in the universal camouflage pattern. The A2CU is made of a blend of 92 percent Nomex, five percent Kevlar, and three percent anti-static dissipative fiber.

The A2CU has also been adopted for use by the US Air Force, where it is known as the Airman Aircrew Combat Uniform.
