= LLM01 =

Light or laser sight module

LLM01 (Laser Light Module 01)
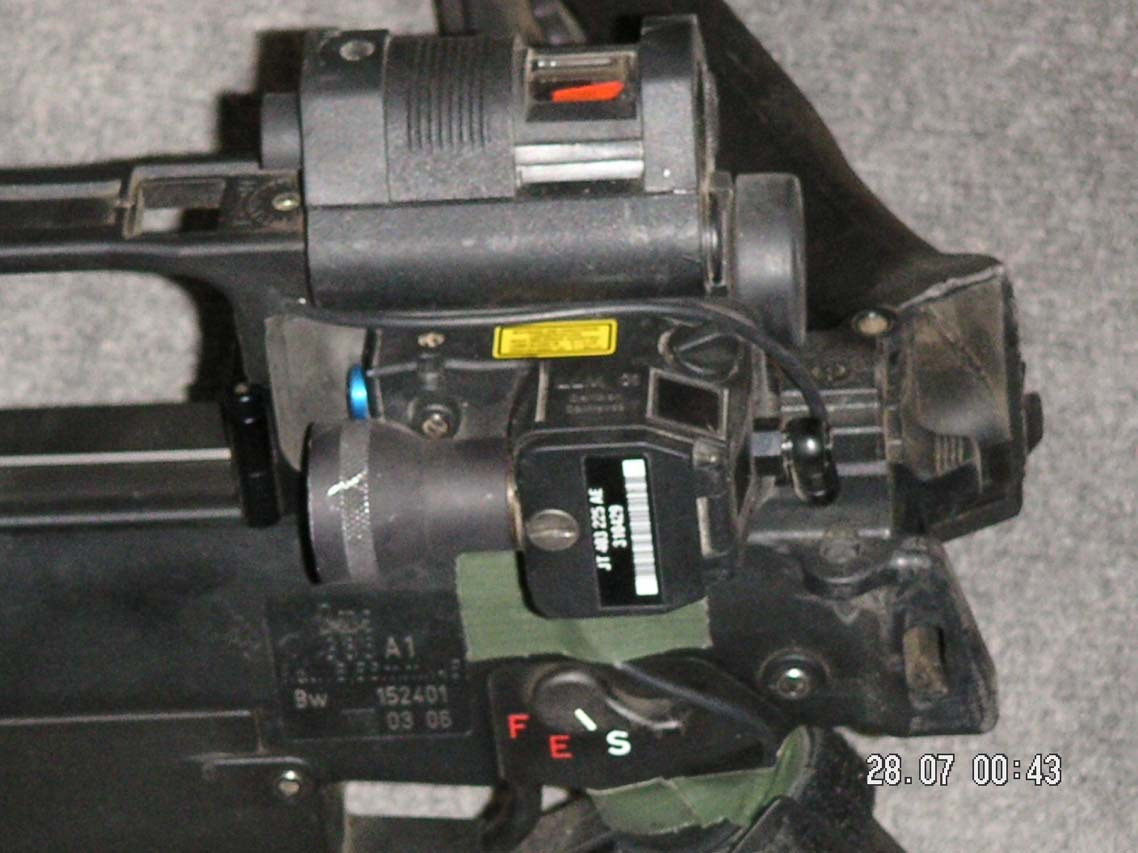
- G36A1 with LLM01 side view
- Place of origin: Germany

Production history
- Manufacturer: Rheinmetall Soldier Electronics GmbH

General Specifications
- Dimensions (L×H×W): 8.6 cm × 4.6 cm × 5.8 cm (3.4 in × 1.8 in × 2.3 in)
- Weight: <220 g (7.76 oz) (w/ batteries)
- Battery life (h): >30hr (IR pointer only) >13hr (IR illuminator) >15hr (red laser) >1hr (white light)

IR Laser Specifications
- IR Laser Class: 1
- IR Laser Output (mw): ≤ 0.40mW
- IR Laser Divergence (mrad): <1mrad
- IR Laser Wavelength (nm): 850nm
- IR Laser Range (m): >200m

Visible Laser Specifications
- Visible Laser Class: 3R
- Visible Laser Output (mw): 5mW
- Visible Laser Divergence (mrad): <1mrad
- Visible Laser Wavelength (nm): 650nm
- Visible Laser Range (m): >200m (darkness) >20m (daytime)

IR Illuminator Specifications
- IR Illuminator Class: 1M
- IR Illuminator Output (mw): ~25mW
- IR Illuminator Wavelength (nm): 880nm
- IR Illuminator Range (m): <10m

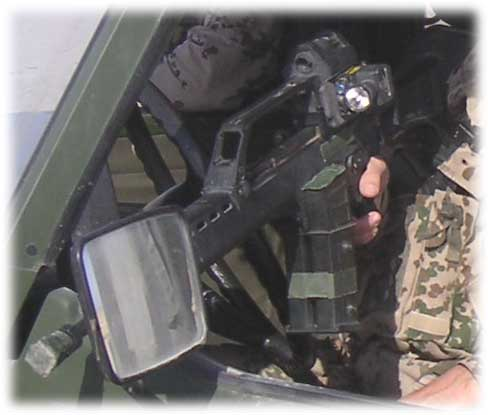
G36A1 with LLM01 front view.

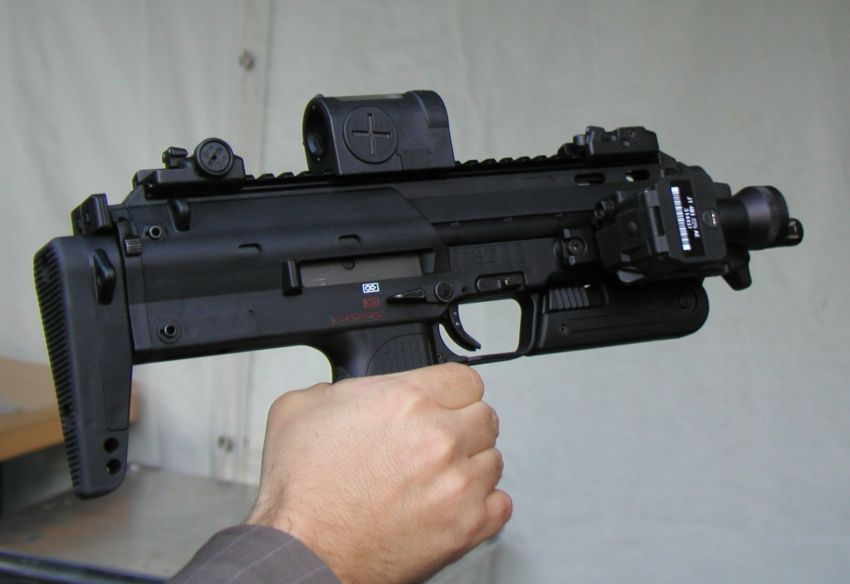
MP7A1 with LLM01 and Zeiss RSA reflex red dot sight.

The LLM01 (Laser Light Module 01) is an adaptive target acquisition module made by Rheinmetall Soldier Electronics GmbH in Stockach, Germany. It is designed to be mounted with a metal integral quick release clamping adapter on the left side of the carry handle adapter of Heckler & Koch G36 assault rifles. It can also be attached to other firearms, such as the Heckler & Koch MP7 submachine gun and L85A2 assault rifle.

== Operation modes ==
The LLM01 offers the following "lighting and/or sighting" options:

- White light halogen incandescent flashlight, 6–8 W, 90–120 lm, 2.5–4 kcd, 100–120 m ANSI/NEMA FL 1-2009 beam distance;
- Non eye-safe laser sight, the visibility depends on the environmental light conditions, suited for quick shots. At dusk the red laser dot is visible just over 150 m;
- Infrared (IR) laser, visible only when LUCIE (part of Germany's IdZ modernization program) or another infrared night vision device is used, unless the enemy has IR night vision equipment the IR laser will not reveal the presence of the LLM01 IR light beam;
- Infrared target illuminator, the IR illuminator has a maximum range of up to 10 m;
- Combinations of white light flashlight and laser red dot and IR laser and IR target illuminator, appropriate for simultaneous lighting and aim point determination.

The LLM01 is operated at the top of the module using a labelled rotary selector switch to switch the device on or off and select various lighting options. The device activation can alternately be performed by a pressure switch connected by cable to the LLM01 device, which can be attached at various positions on the G36 assault rifle or other firearm.

Both laser markers can be adjusted independently in azimuth and elevation for adapting them to the firearm to which the LLM01 is fastened. The LLM01 is waterproof up to 20 m.

The flashlight module can also be swapped out for a laser head which will produce a visible red laser or IR laser and can be used as a pointer or a flood IR/red visible illuminator.

The German Army has started to field an upgraded variant of their basic G36 rifle, which has been allocated the in-service designation G36A2. The G36A2 upgrade kit consists amongst other features of a new handguard with three Picatinny rails and a handgrip with an integrated switch for operating the LLM01 laser light module.

== Users ==
- Austria
- Algeria
- Denmark
- Germany
- Lithuania
- Malaysia
- Netherlands
- United Kingdom
- Slovakia
