= Persistent Close Air Support =

Persistent Close Air Support (PCAS)
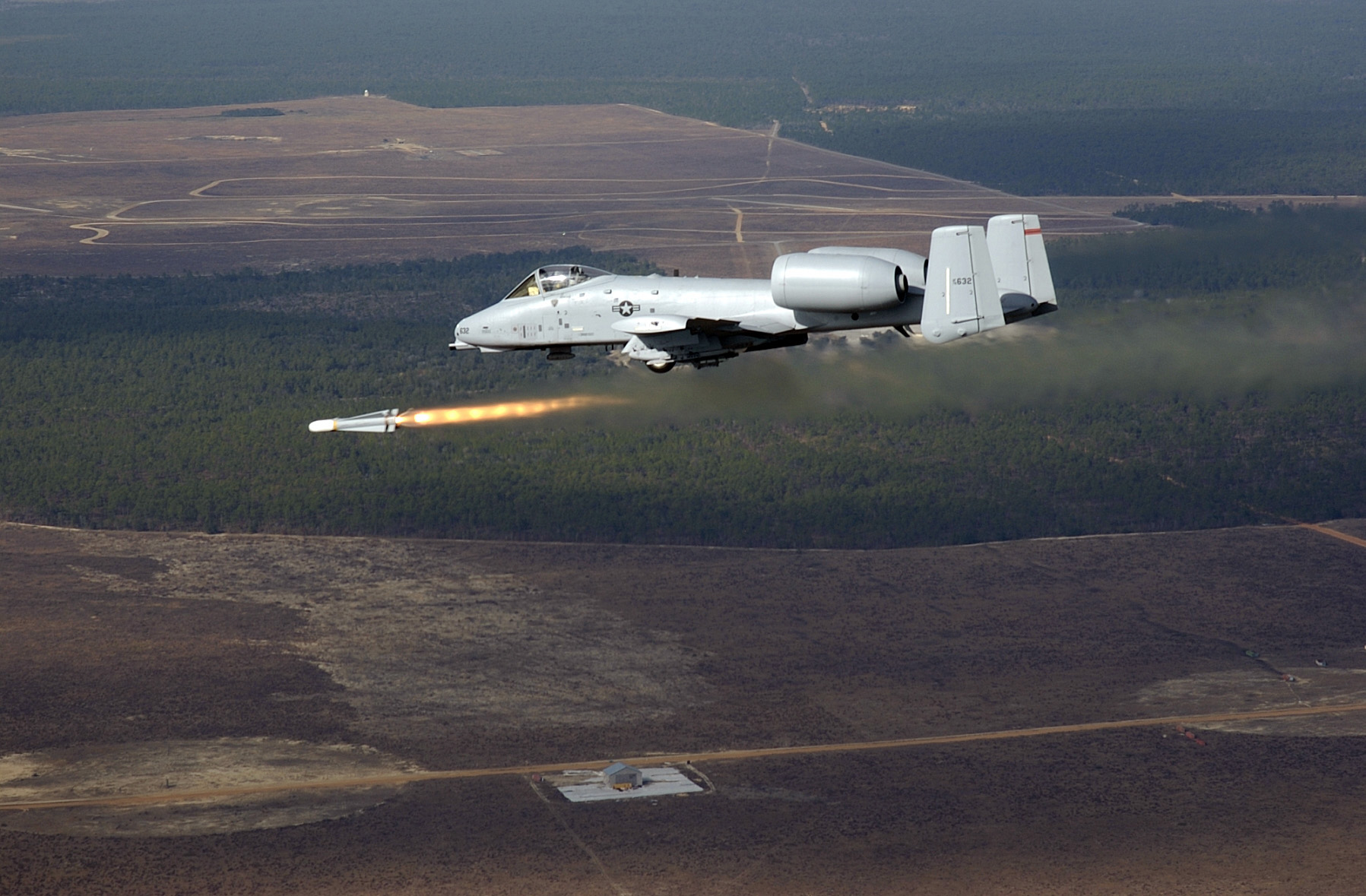
- Program utilizes the A-10 as a demonstration platform.
- Type: Close Air Support
- Place of origin: United States

Persistent Close Air Support (PCAS) is a DARPA program that seeks to demonstrate dramatic improvements in close air support (CAS) capabilities by developing a system to allow continuous CAS availability and lethality to Joint Terminal Attack Controllers (JTACs).

== Overview ==
The program will give JTACs the ability to visualize, select, and employ munitions at the time of their choosing from optionally manned or unmanned aerial attack platforms.

PCAS was to demonstrate using an A-10 Thunderbolt II modified for optionally manned operation, however the program did not seek to remove pilots from the cockpit of A-10s or other manned military aircraft. Technologies developed under the program were to transition to both current manned aircraft and the MQ-X next-generation unmanned aircraft. With the cancellation of the MQ-X program, the PCAS program dropped the idea of using an optionally manned A-10, and refocused the effort to allow the JTAC controller to interface with "smart rail" electronics on a manned A-10.

== Background and design ==
Currently pilots, forward air controllers, and JTACs must focus on one target at a time and rely on voice directions and paper maps to call in air support. This can take up to one hour to be arranged and have an aircraft arrive on station, which allows a target to relocate or attack first. PCAS is to digitally link aircraft with ground controllers to share real-time situational awareness, identify multiple targets simultaneously, jointly select the best precision-guided weapons for the situation, and reduce engagement time to as little as six minutes. Pilots and JTACs will have digital messaging capabilities networked through software programmable radio, which wirelessly transmits IP packets of voice, video, and data. By using Android tablets on the ground and in an aircraft's cockpit they can both view and exchange targeting information using icons, digital maps, and display screens; a JTAC can view a pilot's targeting pod picture in the air and permits a pilot to view target-grid coordinates and other displays from a JTAC's tablet on the ground. Using smart launcher electronics, consisting of a GPS/INS unit, weapons and engagement management systems, high-speed data transfer systems, software and radios, and an Ethernet switch, it integrates software programmable radio with a processor and tablet in the cockpit. Autonomous decision aids also use algorithms to recommend which weapon might be best suited to attack a given target.

The first PCAS phase involved identifying relevant technologies, demonstrating concepts, and developing target-identification systems. The second phase was finalizing the system's design and ground system and clearing it for installation on multiple aircraft. DARPA field-tested parts of PCAS-Ground in Afghanistan from December 2012 to March 2013, deploying some 500 Android tablets equipped with PCAS-Ground situational awareness software, which dramatically improved units' ability to quickly and safely coordinate airstrikes. Raytheon won the $25 million, 18-month Phase 3 contract in February 2014 and began flight tests that October; the entire three-year program was funded at $82 million. Once flight testing of PCAS-Air's modular smart launcher electronics was completed on an A-10 and shown it can connect with a PCAS-Ground kit, the platform-agnostic PCAS system would be available for integration and testing with other fixed and rotary-wing aircraft.

=== Operation ===
To engage ground targets, PCAS-Ground comprises a smart power hub, customized Android tablet computer loaded with situational-awareness and mapping software, and a digital radio that altogether weigh only 5 lb (2.3 kg), plus a laser-targeting device that weighs another 5 lb. When a JTAC identifies a target for attack, they create the "nine-line" engagement plan on the tablet and transmit the plan to the aircraft, with the ability to "stack" multiple identified targets. PCAS-Air software then evaluates and auto-populates the plan with whatever sensor and weapons data is available, sharing the information with PCAS-Ground to confirm the attack. The JTAC gets a countdown to weapons release, and can see an impact line as well as weapon damage radius; both aircrew and JTAC can see video of the target on their tablets, eliminating the need for the larger, dedicated ROVER laptops currently used by JTACs to view airborne video. PCAS makes it easier to accurately deploy weapons with smaller warheads for less collateral damage and gives "Level 3" control to JTACs to remotely steer airborne sensors if needed.

== Testing ==
DARPA conducted the first demonstration of the whole PCAS system with the U.S. Marine Corps on 27 March 2015 during the Talon Reach training exercise. The exercise was the first time the air component was integrated with the ground component in use operationally since 2013, dubbed Kinetic Integrated Low-cost SoftWare Integrated Tactical Combat Handheld (KILSWITCH), combining PCAS-Ground's better navigation, situational awareness, fire coordination, and communications with PCAS-Air's weapons management, ISR, and communications systems on a Smart Launcher Electronics (SLE) device. During the demonstration, ground forces used an Android tablet to identify a target and sent its position to an MV-22 Osprey, which fired an inert AGM-176 Griffin missile from 4.5 mi (7.2 km) and scored a direct hit. In a situation where air support would take 30 minutes or more if called using paper maps and voice instructions, DARPA's objective was to reduce it to six minutes, and the demonstration achieved a hit in only four minutes. In another part of the exercise, two groups of Marines coordinated a night attack using PCAS-Ground. One group launched an AeroVironment Switchblade UAV to provide surveillance and network relay capabilities, which synced to both groups' KILSWITCH tablets to give them the locations of friendly and enemy forces. PCAS-Air's modular design allows it to work with almost any aircraft. The first tests conducted with U.S. Air Force A-10s took place from April through June 2015. Flying 50 sorties, 10 involved live-fire engagements that were carried out within six minutes, where JTACs commanded airstrikes with as few as three clicks on a specially configured Android tablet.

On 8 November 2015, Raytheon announced the flight test phase of the PCAS program, which took place in the first six months of 2015, had been successfully completed, concluding the four-and-a-half year, three phase program. As part of the program's conclusion, DARPA is focusing on transitioning technology to other platforms and working with the U.S. Army on other PCAS transition activity.

== See also ==
- Unmanned aircraft system
- Unmanned combat aerial vehicle
