= Future Soldier 2030 Initiative =

US Army program

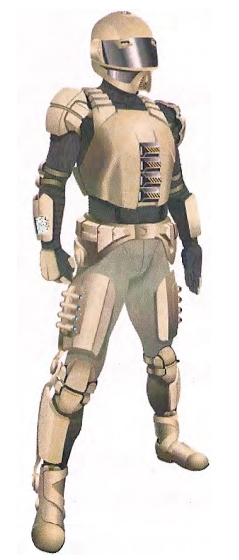
Exoskeletal amplification for body armor, 2030

Future Soldier 2030 Initiative was a US Army program that was launched in 2009 with the mission to research and develop future soldiers' equipments, weapons and body armors. The program investigated various futuristic technologies, including mind boosting drugs, powered exoskeletons and artificially intelligent assistants.

== Cancellation ==
In late 2015, the Future Soldier initiative was largely cancelled and shelved by its backers.

== See also ==
- Future Soldier
- Futures studies
- Supersoldier
