= Advanced Combat Man System =

- Type: Future Soldier Program
- Place of origin: Singapore

Production history
- Designer: Defence Science and Technology Agency, Singaporean Army and Singapore Technologies Electronics
- Designed: 1998 - Present
- Manufacturer: ST Electronics
- Unit cost: $SGD 100 million
- Produced: Currently prototypes
- Variants: See Variants

The Advanced Combat Man System (ACMS) is part of the Singapore Armed Forces's (SAF) move to integrate into 3G to progressively provide tactical units with network capabilities, including C4I capabilities in the field. The project costs about SG$100 million to maintain.

The head of the ACMS project is Lieutenant Colonel Jimmy Toh Yong Leng. According to him, ACMS was created to address the concern of urban warfare operations, especially "key challenges in this environment were survivability, situational awareness (SA) and the avoidance of civilian casualties and collateral damage."

In a future deployment, the section commander and two commanding officers are to be equipped with the ACMS system as a part of honing urban operation capabilities.

== History ==
The ACMS was first developed in 1998 as a joint project by the Singaporean Army and by the Defence Science and Technology Agency (DSTA) alongside ST Electronics and ST Kinetics under a Technology Exploration and Demonstration initiative in order to assess the possibility of simplifying capability and integration issues. It was succeeded in 2002 with a three-year Technology Consolidation and Development effort. Trials took place in 2006 with funding allocated to the Integrated Concept Development and Demonstration stage, which permitted the acquisition of 60 ACMS sets and ACMS sets and two CCIS equipped AFV platforms. Further trails took place in 2008 when Singaporean soldiers conducted live exercises at the Murai Urban Training Facility.

ST Electronics was chosen to be the main contractor responsible for the eventual production of the ACMS. Research and development of the ACMS was completed by 2012. Field tests began in January and March 2010 when two Singaporean Army battalions were equipped with ACMS gear.

== Design ==
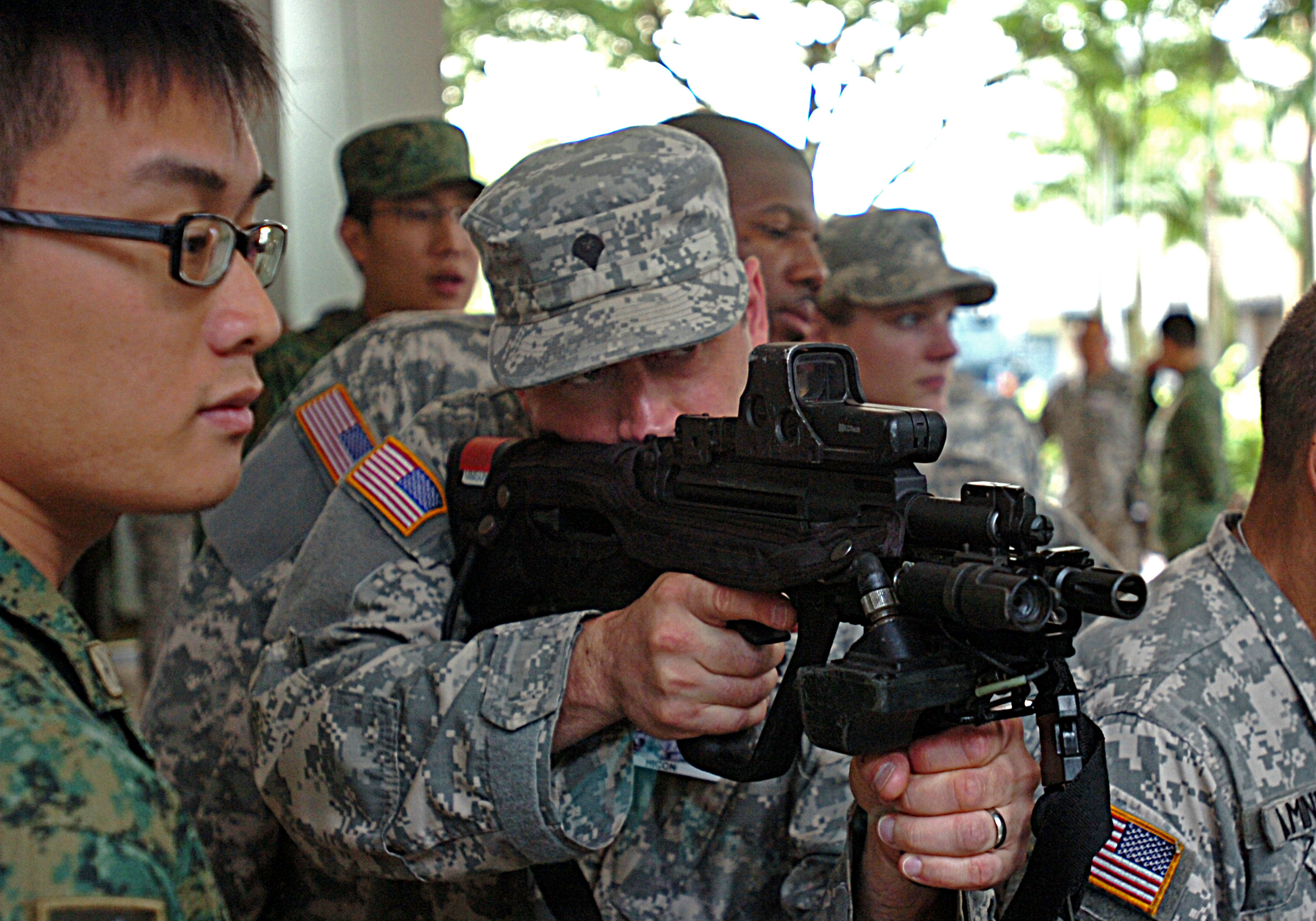
The SAR 21 MMS rifle as handled by a US Army soldier. This variant is implemented as a part of the ACMS system.

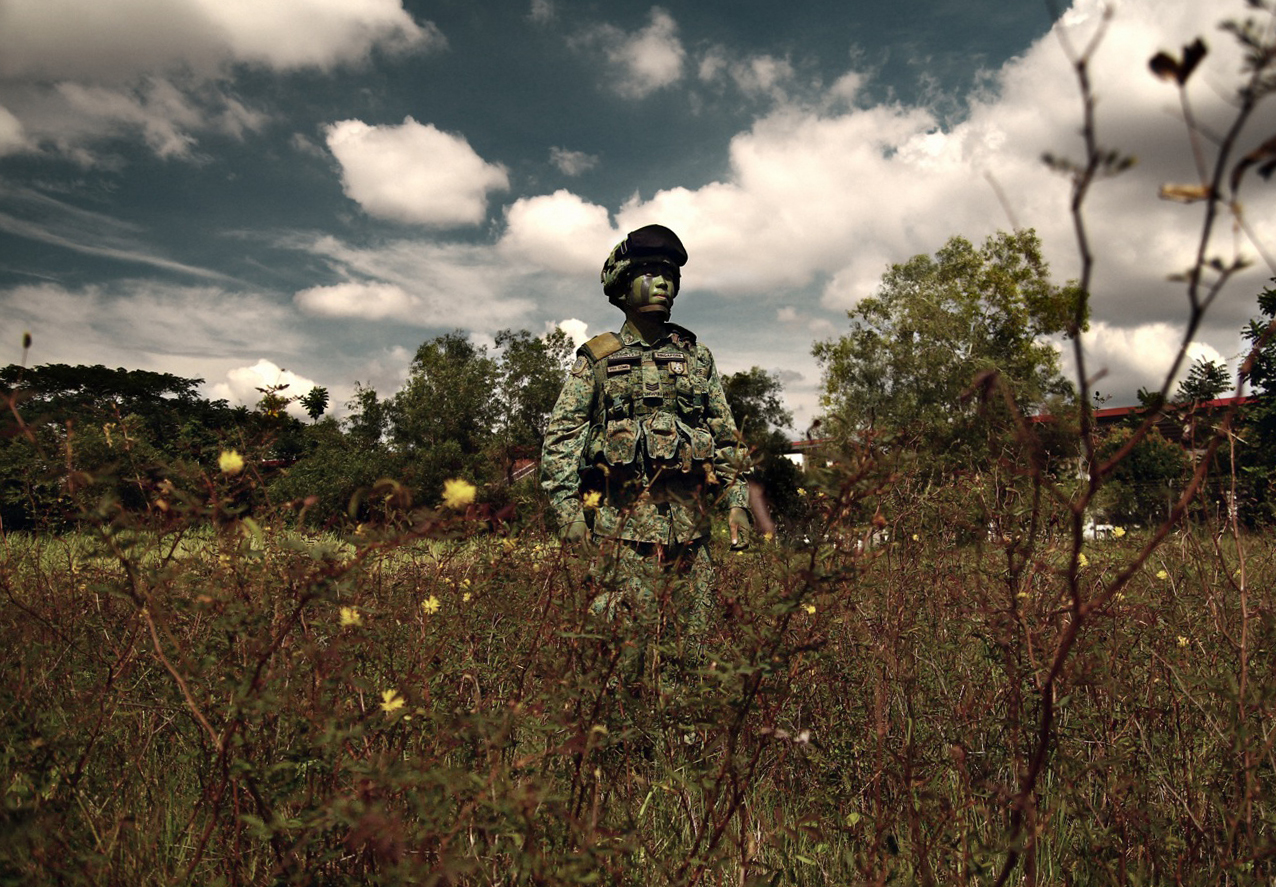
The Singaporean Army's integrated Load Bearing Vest (iLBV) is included as a component of the ACMS.

The challenge with the creation of ACMS was the stature of the average Singaporean soldier, considering that they are smaller than other races. The three modular variants consist of the Basic Fighting System, which is focused on fighting capabilities. The Full Fighting System equips commanders on the field, but has significant C2 capabilities. The Hand Held System which works with the Full Fighting System, which is carried by a commander's aide, providing notebook hosted capabilities, which in trials used a Panasonic Toughbook, for use in stationary mission planning tasks, where greater screen size is necessary and a more complex input device can be used. Initial trials had used Windows XP, but the ACMS later on used commercial off-the-shelf platforms and modified them for military applications.

The main weapon used under the ACMS is the SAR 21's Modular Mounting System variant. For communications, ACMS uses Selex Soldier Personal Radio systems with a noise reduction system to protect the hearing of soldiers. The SAF revealed that the ACMS will be integrated with the vehicle-borne and static Rockwell Collins-Thales FlexNet-One system.

In various trials done initially, the helmet-mounted display was cited to be a hindrance in aiming and moving. Currently, alternatives are being studied, which includes see-through HMDs and membrane displays.

The ACMS has three configurations, which consist of the Basic Fighting System (BFS), Commander Enhancement System (CES), and the Information Management System.

=== Components ===
The components of the ACMS consist of Soldier Computer, Weapon, Head Mount Display, Power, Communications, and Navigation sub-systems. An integrated Load Bearing Vest and a hydration bladder are also included, the former being outfitted with armored plates.

== Variants ==
=== ACMS ===
The first variants of the ACMS system had a total weight of 25 kilograms. The weight proved to be bothersome since it forced wearers to move less than one kilometer in the field. A 2002 revision reduced the weight to 12.5 kilograms. Currently, ACMS includes a soldier computer subsystem, which features a wearable computer and power pack, a communications subsystem supporting wireless radio and data connectivity through mesh networking, full-color OLED based helmet-mounted display and active noise diction hearing protection, indoor and outdoor navigation system with GPS support, and weapon-mounted camera with an ITL MARS reflex sight.

One of the shortfalls is that the full load is heavy, even at 6.5 kilograms. The BFS also heats up and a soldier using it can feel it even when wearing the uniform/load bearing vest.

=== ACMS Lite ===
Currently undergoing development, the ACMS Lite has the latest ARM processor and mobile communications technology to enhance networking and situational awareness capability. The ACMS Lite also includes a smartphone portable device providing mesh-networking communications, processing, and display of situational awareness and support of C2 applications. It's designed for use by team leaders and their members.

=== ACMS iLite ===
A further development of the ACMS first reported in 2015, this was made through the feedback from the original when they reported the weight and the batteries used were too heavy and were in the way of being user friendly. This combines the equipment used in the original ACMS as well as electronics and other technologies that are available commercially in order to let the user be comfortable when moving around and use reliable equipment.

This allows a smartphone device to be used instead of the keypad, portable laptop, and head-mounted display. The Android OS was chosen to be used for the smartphone due to the ability to be easily customized for military needs.

== See also ==
- Infantryman 2000
