= Association of Christians in the Mathematical Sciences =

Christian organization

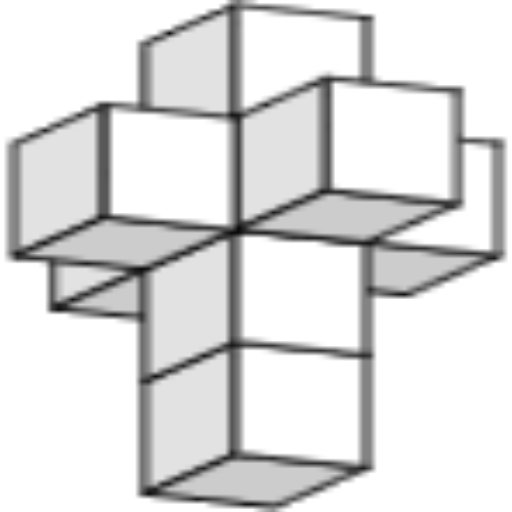
Symbol representing the ACMS

The Association of Christians in the Mathematical Sciences (ACMS) is an organization of professional mathematicians and computer scientists that share Christian beliefs. The organization's goal is to foster community among Christian mathematicians and to explore the interplay between faith and mathematics. The organization has an online journal and hosts a worship service and banquet at the Joint Mathematics Meeting. It also sponsors a biennial conference.

== History ==
The ACMS began as an informal collection of mathematics educators interested in integrating their faith with their academic discipline. From 1976 to 1985, the group operated informally, holding its first conference in 1977. It was officially incorporated in 1985.
