= American Center for Mongolian Studies =

Academic organization based in Mongolia and the United States

- Company type: Academic, Not-for-profit
- Founded: 2002
- Headquarters: 235 South 36th Street; Philadelphia, PA 19104, USA; Ulaanbaatar, Mongolia
- Key people: William Fitzhugh, President of the Board of Directors; Charles Krusekopf, founder and Executive Director; David Dettmann, Director of US Office; Marc Tassé, Resident Director of Mongolia Office
- Website: http://www.mongoliacenter.org/

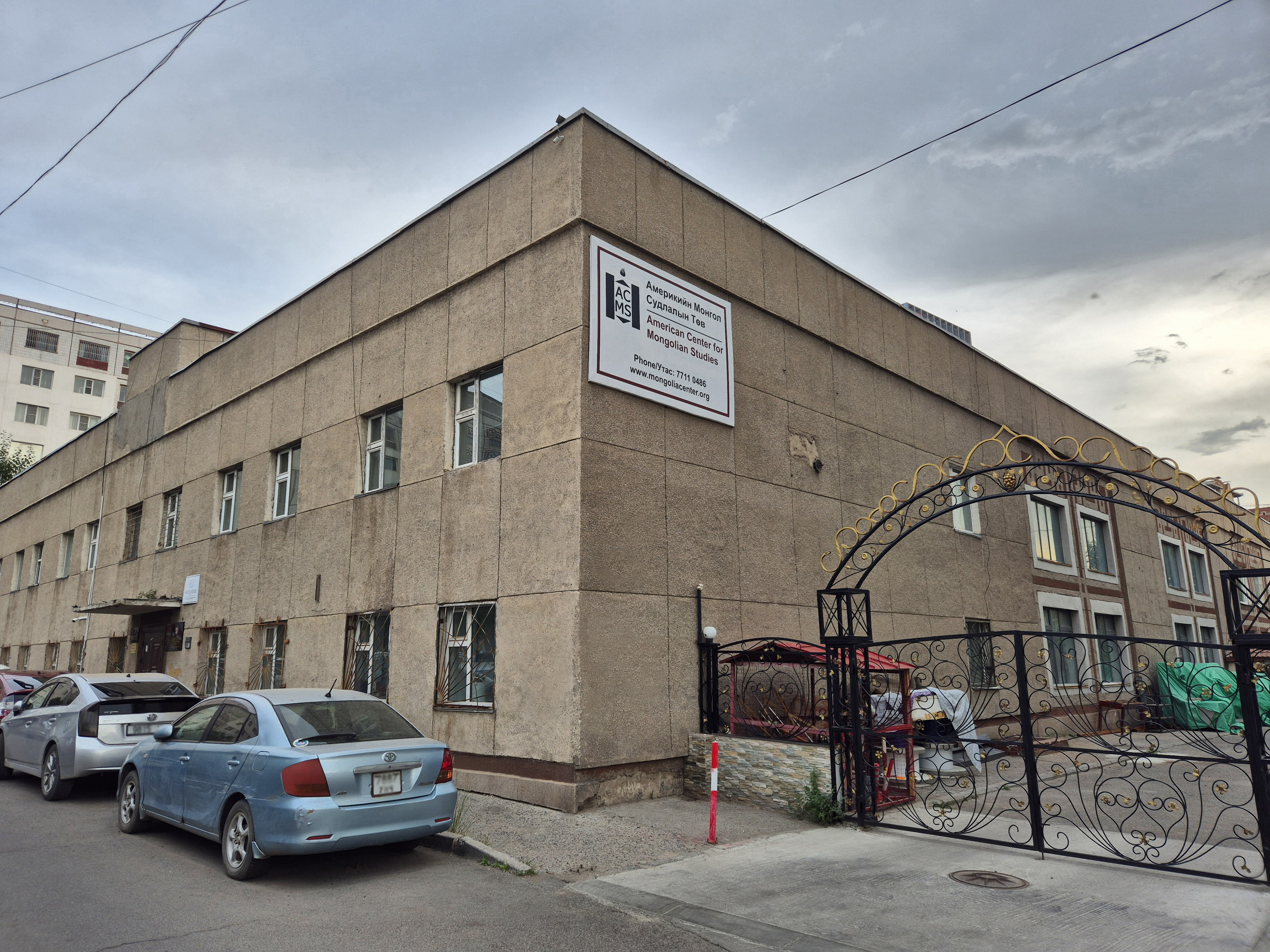
American Center for Mongolian Studies office in Ulaanbaatar, Mongolia

The American Center for Mongolian Studies (ACMS; Mongolian: Америкийн Монгол Судлалын Төв) is a US registered 501(c)3 not-for-profit, academic organization which promotes research and scholarship in Inner Asia, a broad region consisting of Mongolia and parts of China, Russia and Central Asia, including Inner Mongolia, Xinjiang, Buryatia, Tuva and eastern Kazakhstan.

International academic activities in Inner Asia are often conducted within the confines of particular disciplines because opportunities for discussing and sharing cross-discipline research are rare. As a result, research produced within one discipline is not readily available to researchers of other disciplines, and this creates circumstances in which valuable knowledge about Mongolia and Inner Asia is underutilized.

The American Center for Mongolian Studies was established in order to facilitate and coordinate the various multi-discipline research activities occurring each year in the region. It is a consortium of more than 30 academic and cultural institutions in North America and Inner Asia, including the National University of Mongolia, the Smithsonian Institution, Western Washington University, the University of Wisconsin, Indiana University, University of California Berkeley, and University of Pennsylvania. Although similar in some respects to the Mongolia Society at Indiana University, the ACMS is the only US based Mongolian Studies and Inner Asia focused academic and research organization operating a permanent office in Mongolia.

== History ==
The ACMS was incorporated in 2002 in Austin, Texas and established its home office at Austin College. It moved its home office to Western Washington University in 2003, and opened its Mongolia office in 2004, which is currently housed in the School of Foreign Affairs at the National University of Mongolia. From the fall of 2009 to Spring 2014, the University of Wisconsin-Madison Center for East Asian Studies provided logistical support for the home office. In 2014, the ACMS moved offices to the Center for East Asian Studies at the University of Pennsylvania.

Mongolian Studies scholars and discipline based Mongolian researchers were instrumental in the establishment of the ACMS, and the United States Department of Education, United States Embassy in Mongolia, and Council for American Overseas Research Centers (CAORC) contributed significant financial resources to establish and operate the ACMS Mongolia office.

In November 2013 the ACMS Mongolia office moved to its current location inside the East Entrance of Natsagdorj Library in Ulaanbaatar.

== Governance ==
A board of directors comprising one representative from each member institution and “board members at large” elected by ACMS individual members oversees the activities of the ACMS and provides guidance in addressing research issues in Inner Asia. It is governed by officers nominated and elected to two year terms by the board itself. These officer positions include president, vice-president for external relations, vice-president for member services, treasurer, and secretary. The board of directors also appoints the executive staff which supervises the daily operations of the organization. This executive staff includes the executive director of the ACMS, resident director of the ACMS Mongolia office, and deputy director of the ACMS Mongolia office.

== Officers ==
- President - William Fitzhugh, Smithsonian Institution
- Vice-President for External Relations - Dr. Paula DePriest, Smithsonian Institution
- Vice-President for Member Services - Dr. Julian Dierkes, University of British Columbia
- Treasurer - Dr. Meredith Giordano, International Water Management Institute
- Secretary - Dr. Elizabeth Endicott, Middlebury College

== Membership ==
The center is a member of the Council of American Overseas Research Centers. The organization has over 30 institutional members which include universities, museums, and other not-for-profit, educational or cultural organizations. In addition, the ACMS has over 300 individual members and sponsors.

== Logo ==
The logo is derived from the Mongolian Soyombo symbol, the symbol on the national flag of Mongolia.

== Activities ==
Promoting research and scholarship in Inner Asia is the stated goal of the ACMS. It organizes and conducts international conferences, provides fellowships to student researchers, cooperates with local libraries to improve access to materials, and produces informational resources about academic activities in Inner Asia. It provides logistical support to individual researchers and institutions such as the Smithsonian Institution and United States Geological Survey. In addition, it organizes regular public lectures, the Speaker Series, in Ulaanbaatar which are given by Mongolian and international scholars on various research topics.

== Research ==
Mongolia was overlooked in much of the congressional spending legislation produced in the post-Soviet era, such as the Fulbright-Hays Title VIII program. As a consequence direct US government support for the field of Mongolian Studies dwindled relative to other area studies throughout the 1990s, and institutional support for discipline-based research in Mongolia was not well organized. In spite of this, between 1990 and 2003 over 70 PhD dissertations and Masters theses were written at US universities about topics related to Mongolia or involving Mongolia as the context of the research. The ACMS was founded with the intention of providing the institutional support to address these resources issues and organize research produced in the region.

== Books for Mongolia program ==
In November 2013, The Asia Foundation signed a partnership agreement for the management of the Books for Asia Mongolia program with ACMS. ACMS operates the program under the title Books for Mongolia. The Books for Asia program is a popular program which leads in the region with book donation initiatives. Books for Asia puts one million brand new books into the hands of students, educators, and local and national leaders in 19 countries annually.

In Mongolia, over 800,000 books and textbooks have been donated and distributed to schools, kindergartens, universities, libraries, and government and non-government organizations throughout Mongolia since 1990. Books for Mongolia will continue to provide a world of information and opportunity to Mongolians by providing new and high quality English language books to organisations throughout Mongolia.

== Library Access ==
Library resources of significant research value are difficult to access in Mongolia. Inconsistent business hours, inaccessible catalogs, and poor research environments occasionally produce insurmountable barriers for researchers. The ACMS provides logistical support to researchers in order to gain access to collections that individuals may not be able to access on their own. In addition, the ACMS maintains its own library of Mongolian Studies and discipline-based academic materials which is open to the public. It is also a participating member of the Local Libraries and Archives Project under the guidance of the American Institute for Yemeni Studies (AIYS) and the Council of American Overseas Research Centers (CAORC), with funding support from the US Department of Education Technological Innovation and Cooperation for Foreign Information Access (TICFIA) program which aims to increase digital access to foreign library resources through the Digital Library for International Research.
