= Air Warrior (U.S. Army) =

US combat aircrew

The Air Warrior (AW) is an integrated life-support ensemble for combat aircrew, designed for aircrews in the U.S. Army Aviation Branch.

The Air Warrior is fielded in blocks to rapidly provide enhanced capabilities to the warfighter. It integrates clothing and equipment, such as the Army Aircrew Combat Uniform, and ballistic protection from other product managers. As of April 2020, more than 18,000 AW systems had been used in support of Operation Iraqi Freedom and Operation Enduring Freedom.

As of 2025, the Air Warrior program has transitioned from the acquisition phase to sustainment. It is being replaced by the Air Soldier System (Air SS), which aims to further reduce the physical and cognitive load on aircrews through lighter materials and enhanced sensor integration.

== Components ==
=== Electronic Data Manager ===
The Spiral 3.5 Electronic Data Manager (EDM) is a lightweight sunlight-readable touch-screen computer operating on Windows-based software. The EDM is in the form of a kneeboard and provides the aviator with an Aviation Mission Planning System interface, enhanced situational awareness, and GPS moving map capabilities. It also enables the aircrew to plan and execute missions and react to mission changes in-flight. More than 2,200 Spiral 3.5 EDMS have been fielded.

=== Portable Helicopter Oxygen Delivery System ===
The Portable Helicopter Oxygen Delivery System (PHODS) is a breathing oxygen product worn by the aircrew that provides supplemental oxygen to soldiers without restricting their movements. An automatic regulator dispenses oxygen via nasal cannula in the correct amount and rate based on altitude and the individual’s breathing rate. It replaces the Helicopter Oxygen System, which weighed over 100 pounds, tethered the user to the aircraft, and could not be fitted on all Army rotary wing aircraft. Over 1,175 systems have been fielded as of 2011.

=== Aircraft Wireless Intercom System (AWIS) ===
The Aircraft Wireless Intercom System (AWIS) provides cordless communication between aircrew members. The system has a duplex voice-activated mode, hands-free mode, and a push-to-talk mode. It features fifty independent channels/aircraft networks with up to six crew members on each aircraft network. AWIS enables simultaneous omnidirectional communications among all users in the aircraft network within 200 feet of the center of the aircraft and provides intercom capabilities between the entire aircraft crew, hoist operators, and rescue personnel on the hoist. Over 130 systems are fielded as of mid-2010 and an encryption capability will be added in Fiscal Year 2011.

=== Increment III ===
AW Increment III includes:

- Electronic Data Manager, a portable digital mission planning device for over-the-horizon messaging and enhanced situational awareness capabilities through connectivity to Blue Force Tracking-Aviation
- Aircraft Wireless Intercom System for secure cordless, hands-free aircrew communications
- Survival Kit, Ready Access, Modular (SKRAM)
- Go Bag with integrated hydration
- Portable Helicopter Oxygen Delivery System, a Soldier-worn supplemental breathing oxygen system for high-altitude operations
- Communication Enhancement and Protection System (CEPS), providing helmet hear-through capability

=== Successor ===
Improving upon the legacy Air Warrior gear carriage and clothing system, the Air Soldier System (Air SS) Increment 1a initiative aims to increase aircrew survivability, mobility and comfort.

The Air SS Increment 1a features improved survival equipment (72-hour requirement) and removes unnecessary items. It also includes standardized survival gear components. It reduces the weight and width of the legacy Air Warrior body armor system. As part of the AS Increment 1a, the Modular Aircrew Common Helmet (MACH) or an improved legacy HGU-56/P helmet offers a 15-50 percent improvement in protection from head collisions. Progress in laser eye protection are also included in the initiative.

The Wearable Environmental Control System (WECS), powered by a portable power source, eliminates the need of an umbilical cooling system for nonrated crew members. The AS Increment 1a will also feature improved SA/C3 capabilities to accomplish interoperability with the Joint Battle Command-Platform (JBC-P) satellite network. Initial implementation of terrain avoidance functions will be available through the AW Electronic Data Manager.

Contract award for AS Increment 1a is expected in 2011.

In late 2025, the U.S. Army Aviation and Missile Command issued updated contract opportunities for the continued sustainment and modernization of the Electronic Data Manager (EDM). Under the Air Soldier initiative, the legacy EDM, worn on the thigh, is planned for replacement by aircraft-mounted Mission Display Modules. This shift is intended to move the pilot's "heads-down" workload onto the instrument panel, increasing situational awareness during critical flight phases. Additionally, the new Modular Aircrew Common Helmet (MACH) is being rolled out to provide up to a 50% improvement in head collision protection compared to legacy HGU-56/P systems.

=== Microclimate Cooling System ===
The Microclimate Cooling System (MCS) gives Army aircrews an increase of over 350 percent mission endurance (from 1.6 hours to 5.7 hours), while wearing chemical protective equipment or in other heat stress mission environments. The system features a vest and aircraft-mounted cooling unit that pumps chilled water via an umbilical to small tubes embedded in the vest. Because of its success as part of the Air Warrior ensemble, the MCS was also being used by crews in ground vehicle platforms in Operation Iraqi Freedom, including Stryker, Abrams, and Bradley.

== See also ==
- Land Warrior
- Future Force Warrior
