= Commercial Joint Mapping Toolkit =

DoD standard mapping toolkit for C2I software

The Commercial Joint Mapping Toolkit, or CJMTK is the DoD standard mapping toolkit for DoD C2I Programs of Record. It is a replacement for the previous United States Department of Defense (DoD) Joint Mapping Toolkit (JMTK) that utilizes commercial off-the-shelf (COTS) components. The primary component of CJMTK is Esri's complete ArcGIS platform.

The National Geospatial-Intelligence Agency (NGA) is the U.S. Government program manager for CJMTK. Program Management and Technical Support is contracted under the Sustained Analytic Services (SAS) Contract to Leidos. NGA licenses ArcGIS from Esri to provide the CJMTK across DoD C2I Programs. DoD C2I Programs of Record can obtain, develop on, and deploy CJMTK as part of their mission systems free of charge.

CJMTK is a collection of software developer components and end user applications used by developers to add geospatial capabilities to military mission applications. CJMTK is made up of components from Esri's Enterprise GIS Platform, ArcGIS, including ArcGIS Engine, ArcGIS Runtime, and ArcGIS Enterprise. CJMTK supports development for a range of platforms, including desktop, client/server, web-based, and mobile. The CJMTK also provides for development using a range of programming languages.

The primary users of CJMTK are U.S. Department of Defense (DoD) Command, Control, & Intelligence (C2I) Programs of Record. C2I programs apply for CJMTK establish they meet the criteria as a C2I Program of Record. Approval to use CJMTK under the Toolkit option provides free, unlimited license use and life cycle support.

CJMTK does provide a Foreign Military Sales (FMS) provision in order to support FMS of C2I Programs to foreign countries.
