= Infanterist der Zukunft =

German military modernization program

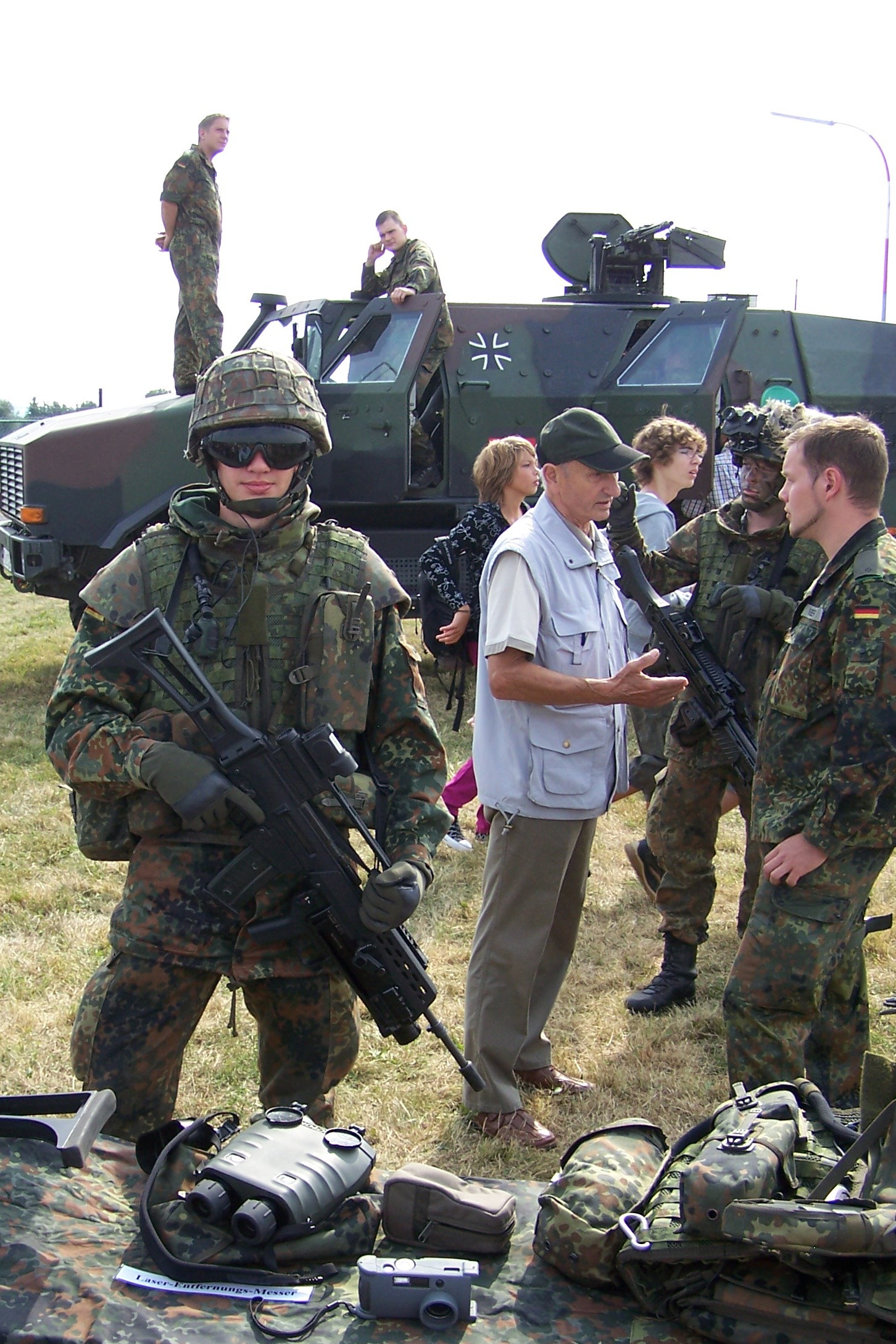
A German Army soldier demonstrates some of the equipment of the IdZ program.

Infanterist der Zukunft (IdZ, English: "Infantryman of the future") is the German Bundeswehr's program as part of the Future Soldier project. It is a modular, integrated fighting system designed to provide significant lethality, survivability, mobility, battle command, and training to the German infantryman. It is being developed by EADS Defence Electronics and Rheinmetall-Detec.

On 1 July 2004, the German government through the Federal Office of Defense Technology and Procurement ordered 15 IdZ integrated front-line warrior systems worth €10 million ($14.7 million or £7.4 million) for German forces deployed within the ISAF in Afghanistan.

On 3 December 2004, EADS Defense Electronics received a €70 million contract to provide the Bundeswehr with 196 IdZ individual soldier equipment. These basic systems are envisaged for use by around 2,000 German soldiers from all services. More systems of the enhanced version will be delivered between 2010 and 2014.

The IdZ system covers self-protection against small caliber arms and nuclear, biological and chemical agents, communications, navigation/ orientation and weaponry. The system utilizes a wide range of new technologies to achieve network-centric warfare capability.

== IdZ Version V2 ==
The Projekthaus System Soldat industrial consortium led by Rheinmetall Defence is currently developing IdZ -ES- for the German Army, the German Air Force and the German Navy. Prototype units will be delivered during Q1/2 in 2008. Approx. 1.100 IdZ-ES systems are scheduled for deliveries between 2010 and 2014. The IdZ-ES system particularly focuses on the infantry squad in combination with its transport vehicle, which will function as "mother ship" providing the squad with network centric capabilities. The vehicle has all weapons and equipment on board so that the necessary elements can be selected from the modular system. The vehicle also provides the squad with power supply and allows data transmission. The basic version of the IdZ system has already been integrated in some military vehicles, such as the ATF Dingo, Mungo ESK, TPz Fuchs and BV 206 D/S. The enhanced ES-system offers these capabilities as standard options in the future Boxer MRAV vehicles and Puma infantry fighting vehicles.

== Sniper rifles ==
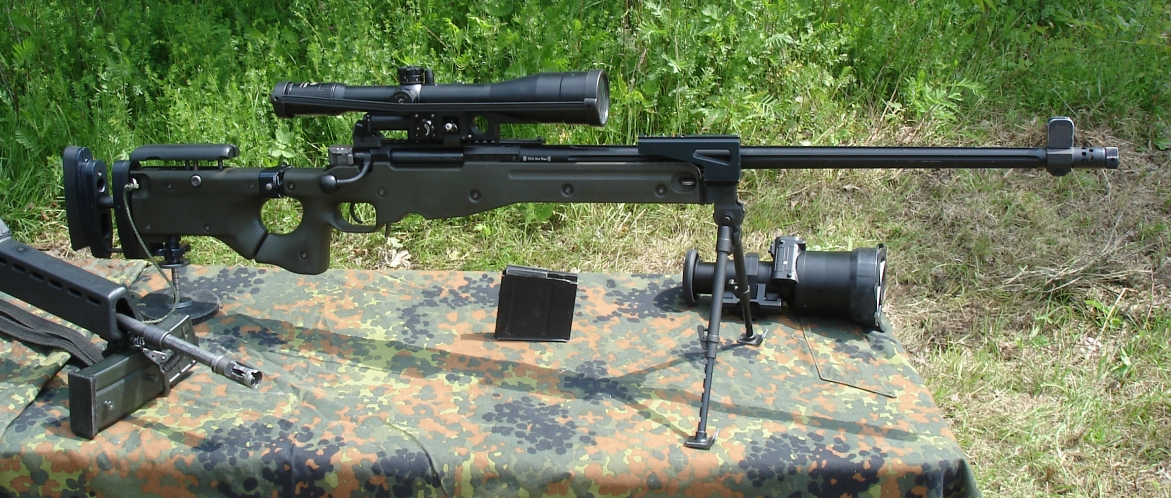
G22

Both standard sniper rifles of the Bundeswehr, the G22 and the G82, will be integrated into the IdZ program. The G82 has been procured specifically for this program.

== KM2000 ==
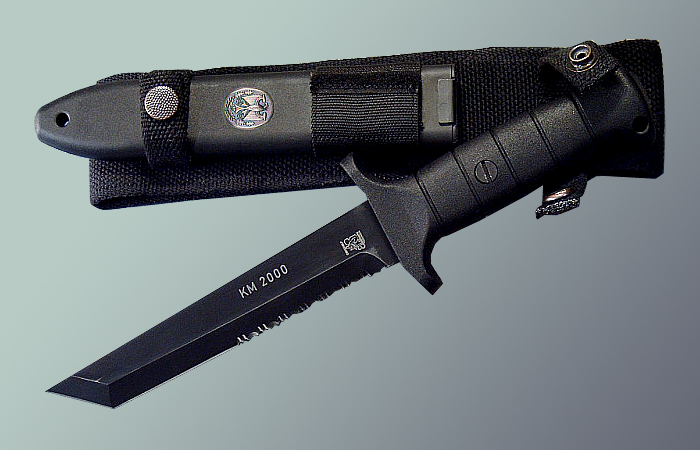
KM2000

The KM2000 is the new standard combat knife of the Bundeswehr.

The laser-cut blade is 17.2 cm (6.8 in) long and made of stainless steel. The knob is ergonomically shaped to be used ambidextrously and is made of polyamide. The entire knife weighs approximately 320 grams (11 ounces).

== UAVs and ROVs ==
The IdZ system will be supplement by mini- or micro UAVs or small, remotely controlled offroad vehicles. First UAVs are the Aladin airborne reconnaissance drone and the MIKADO air robot for close area imaging. The video feedback of the Aladin and the MIKADO air robot can be displayed on the soldiers NavIComs or on video visors.

== Weapon sight ==
Recently the Bundeswehr decided against the AN/PAS-13 in favor of the HuntIR thermal sight, produced by Diehl BGT Defence, + the NSA80 night vision. Also the LLM01 laser light module for the G36 has been ordered.

Also a video weapon sight and reconnaissance 40mm ammunition are currently under development for future integration into the IdZ-program.

Related images
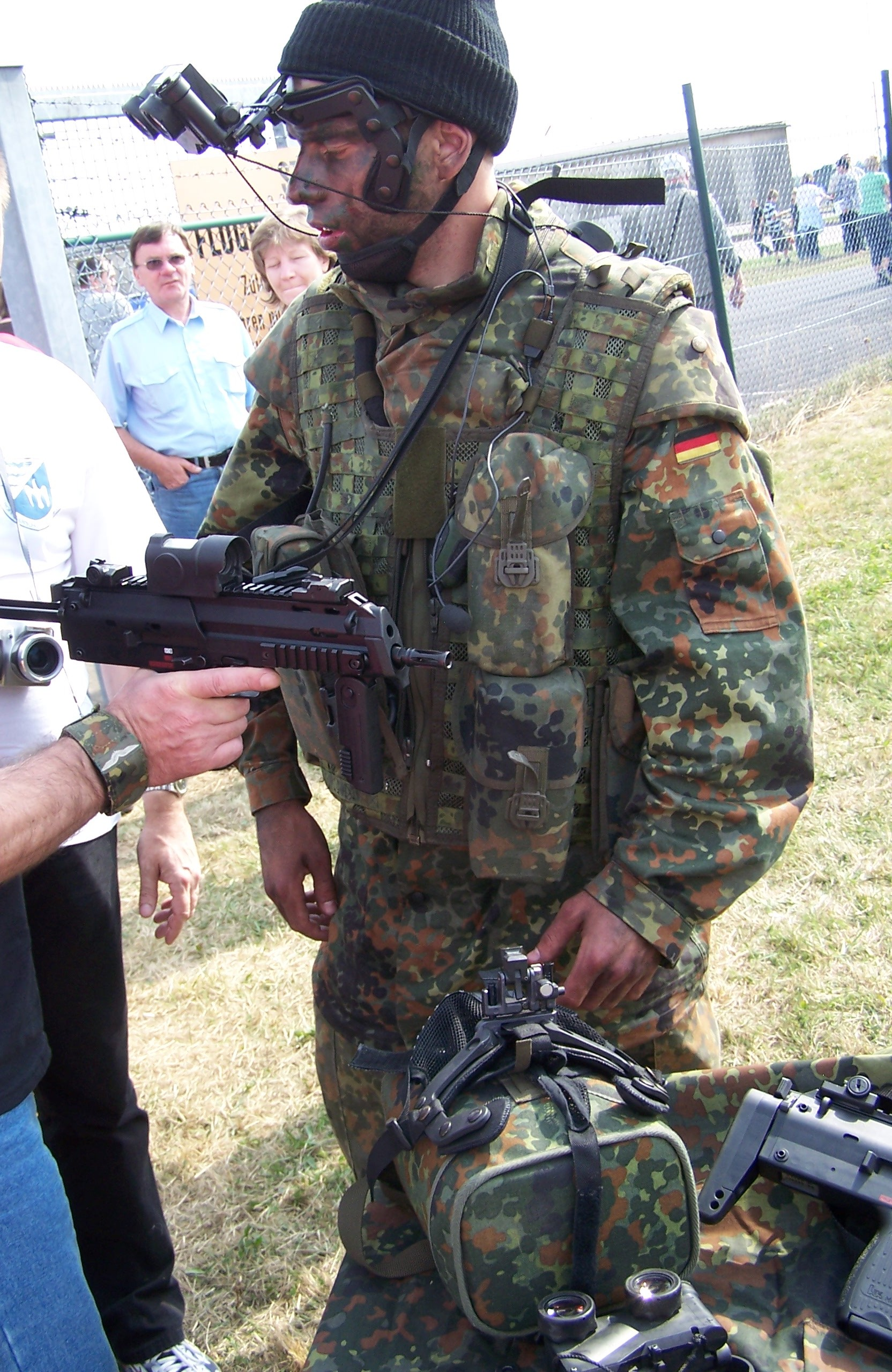
A German Army soldier demonstrates the MP7A1 Personal Defence Weapon (PDW) of the IdZ program

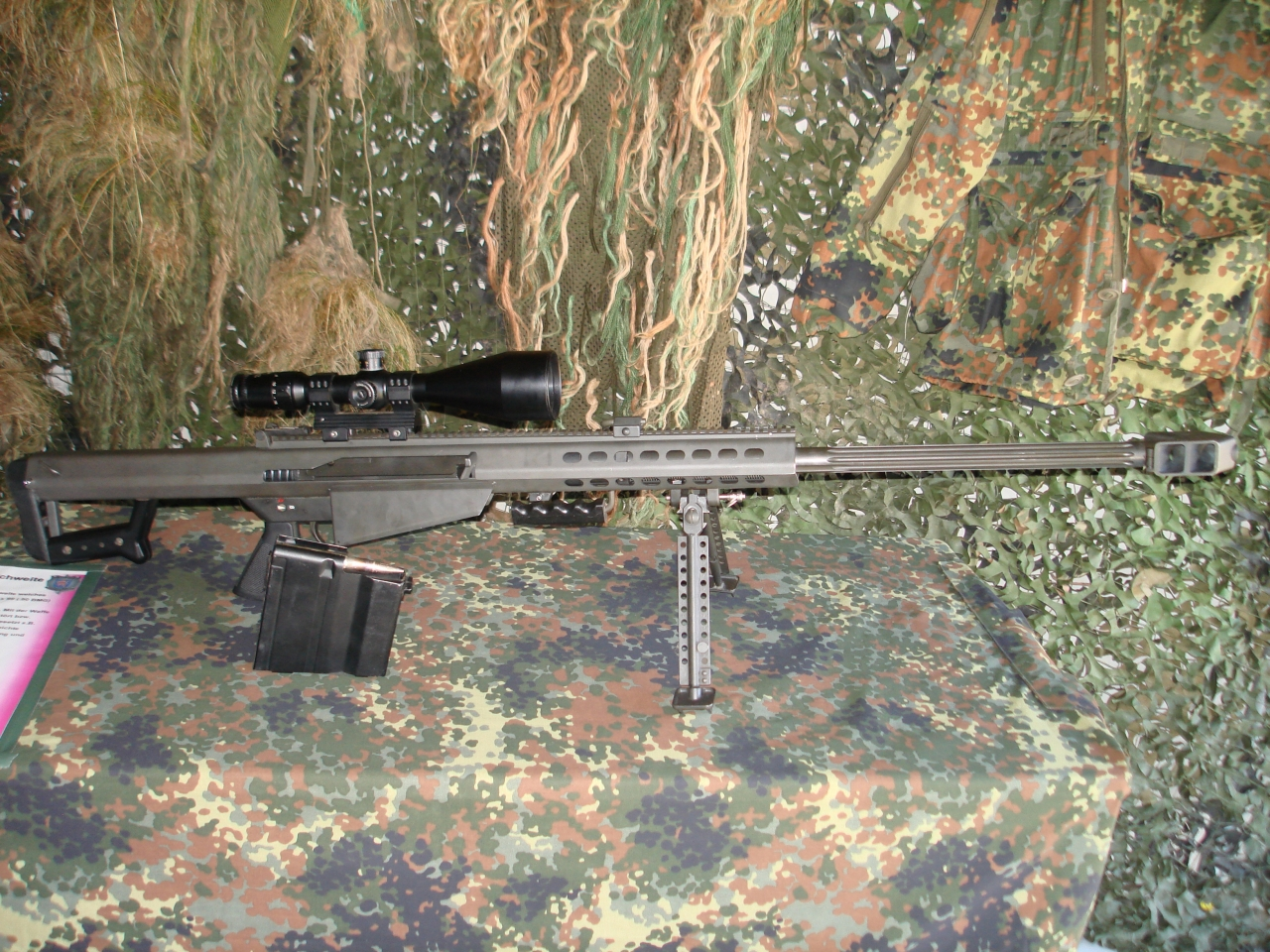
G82

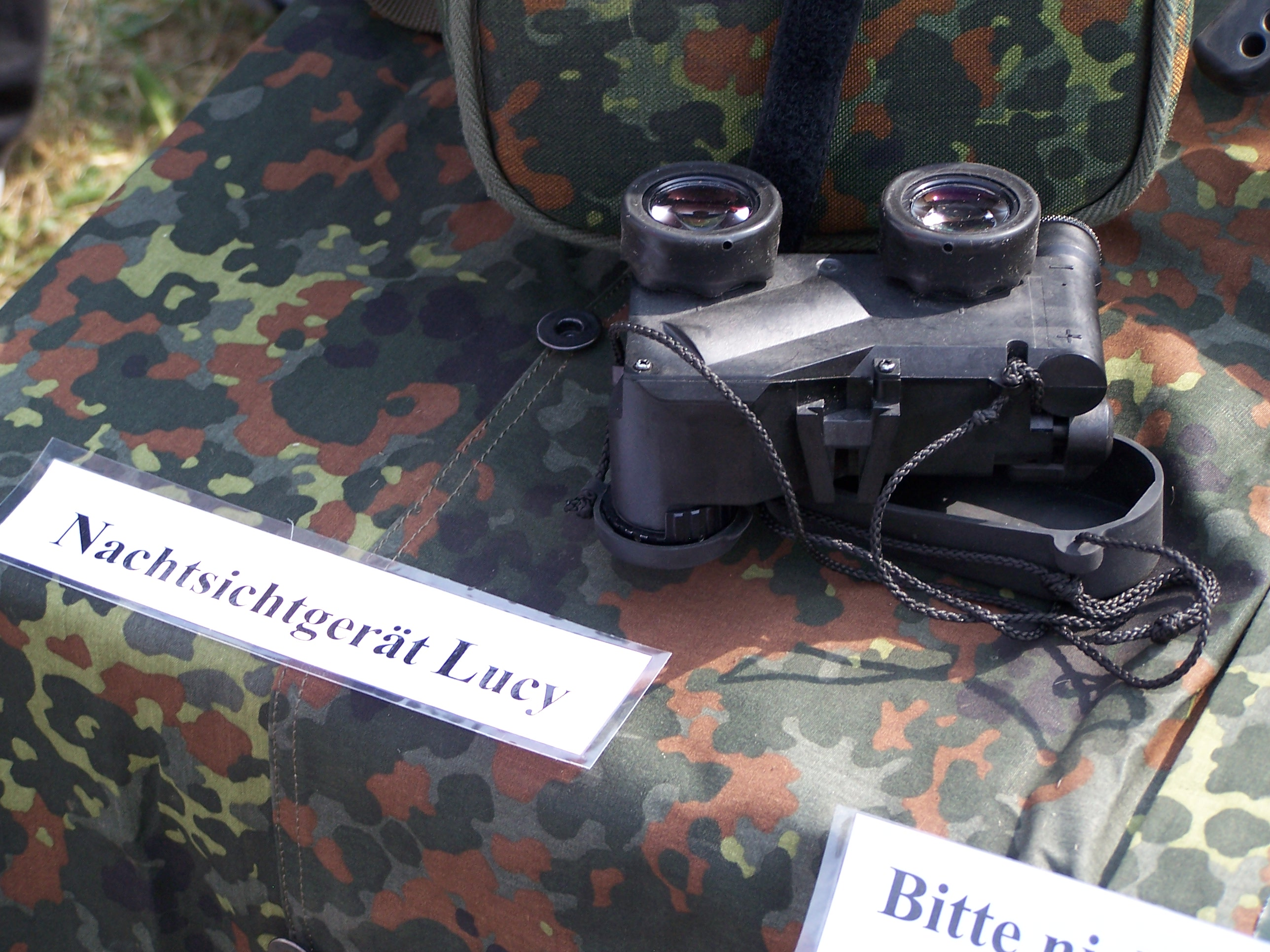
"LUCIE", a fourth-generation night vision device, incorrectly named "Lucy" here

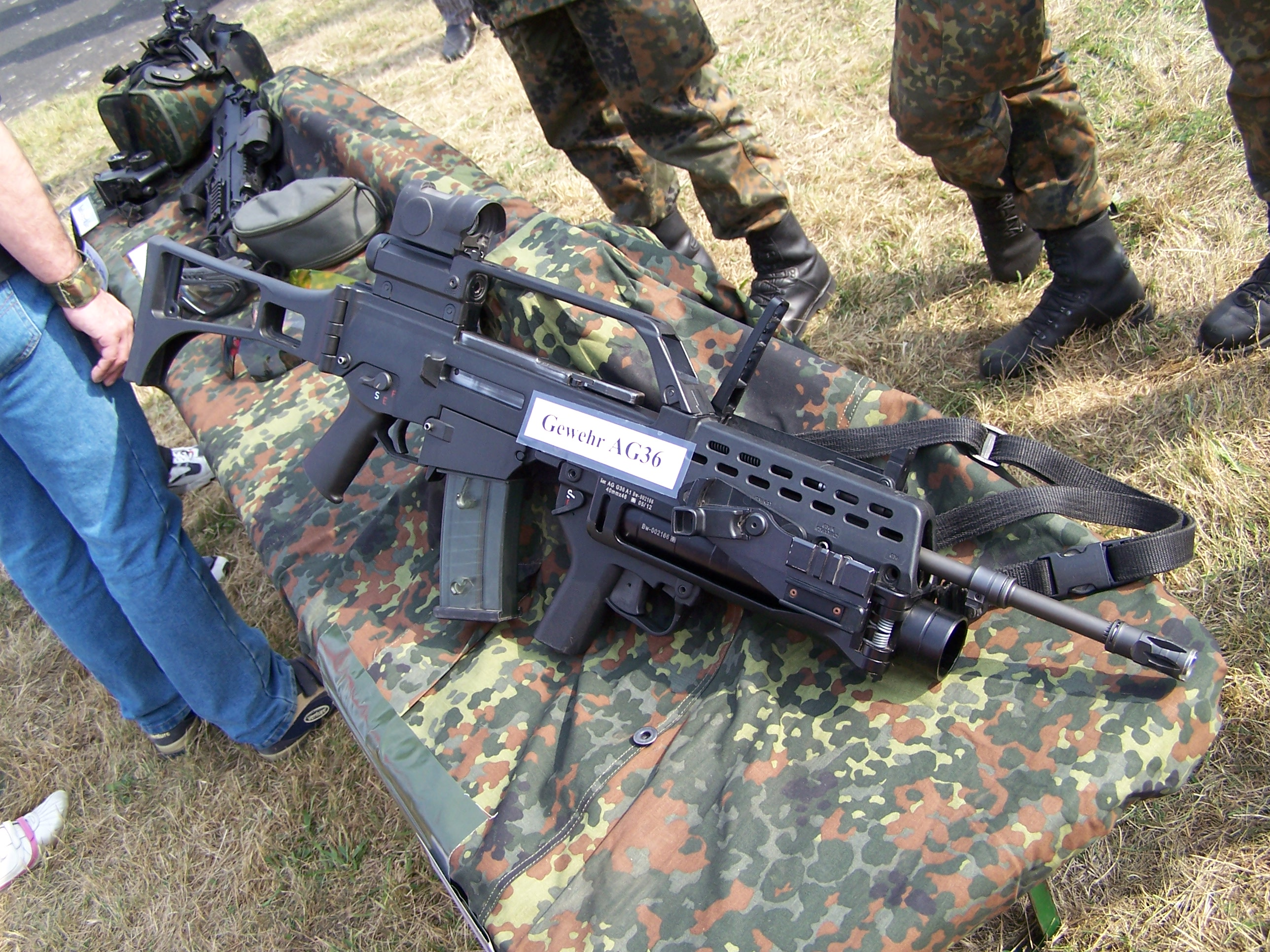
A G36A2 of the Bundeswehr with a Zeiss RSA reflex sight and an AG36 grenade launcher (2008).

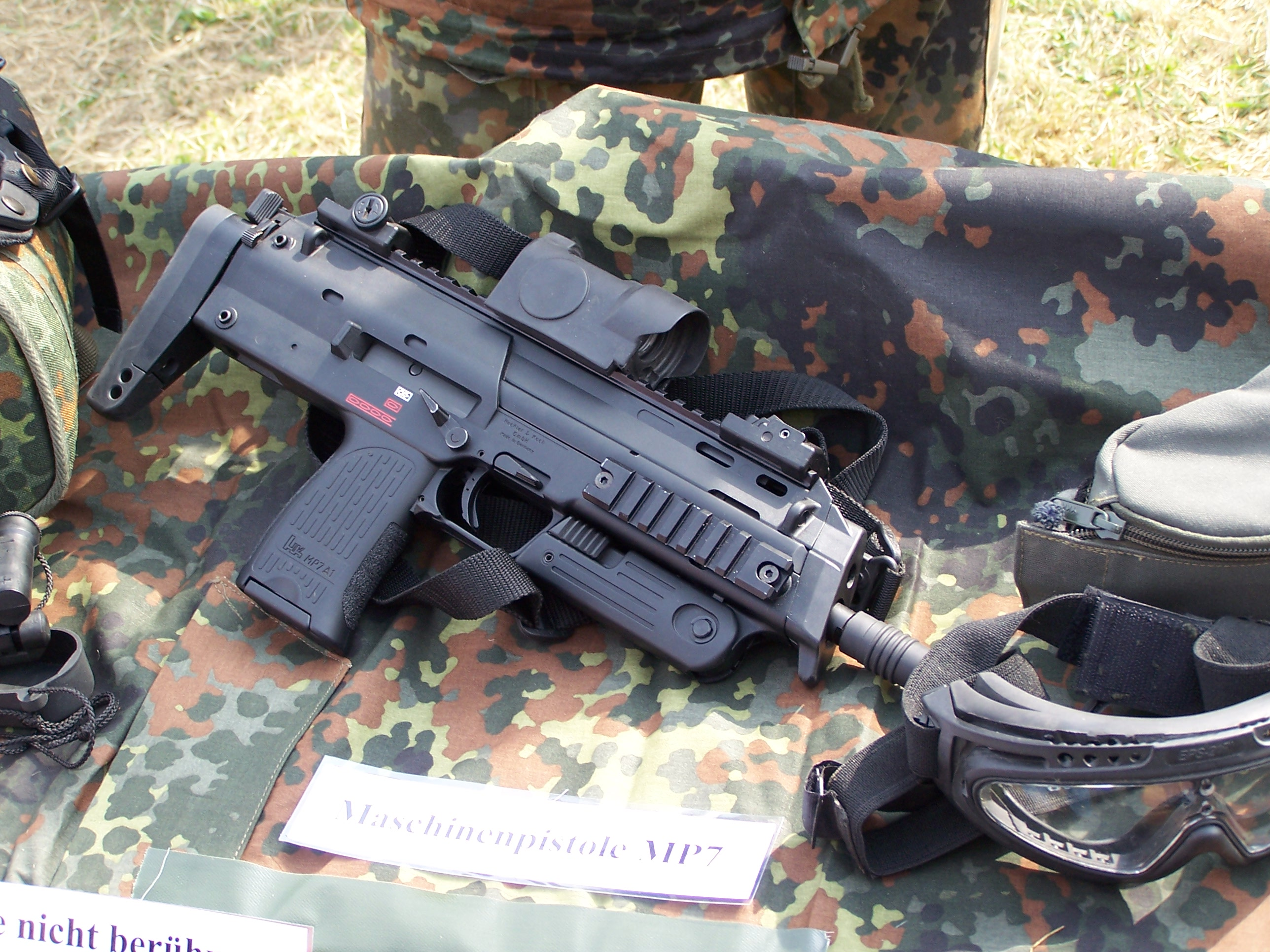
MP7A1.

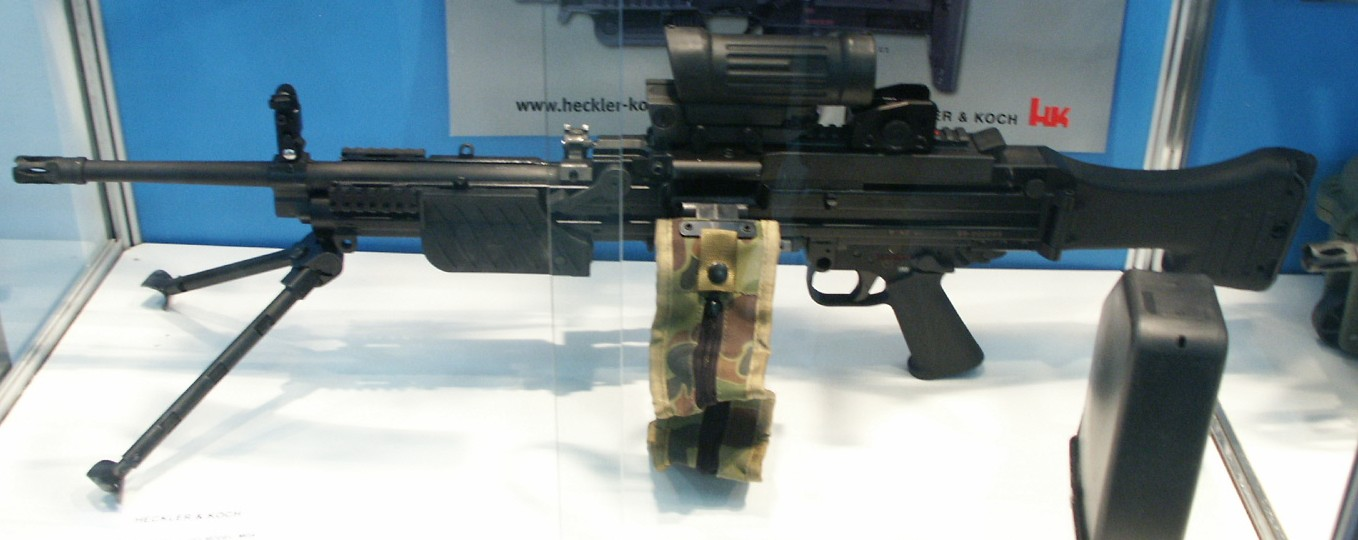
MG4

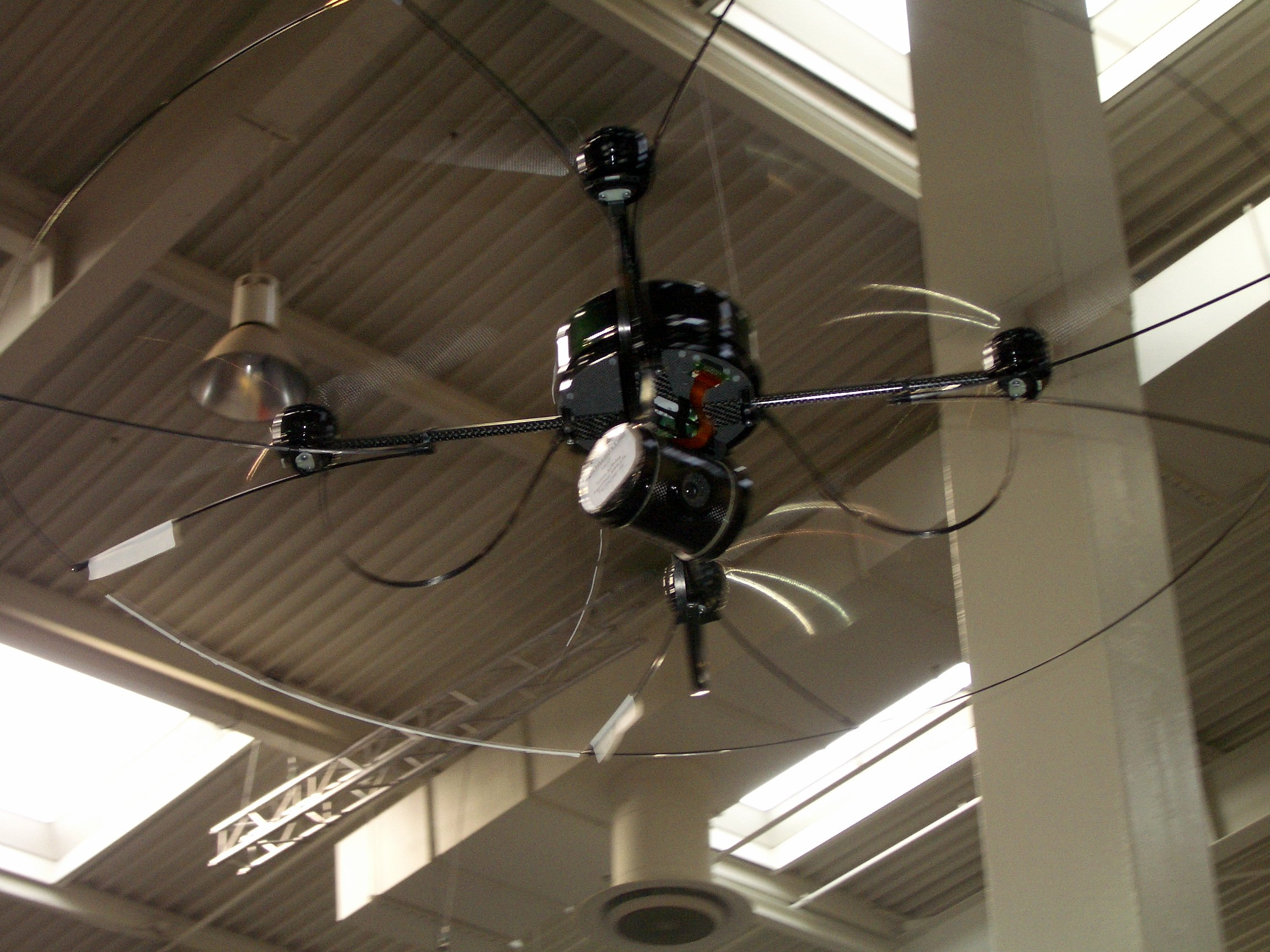
MIKADO air robot holding a camera at the booth of the Bundeswehr at the CeBIT 2006.
