= Future Soldier =

US military project

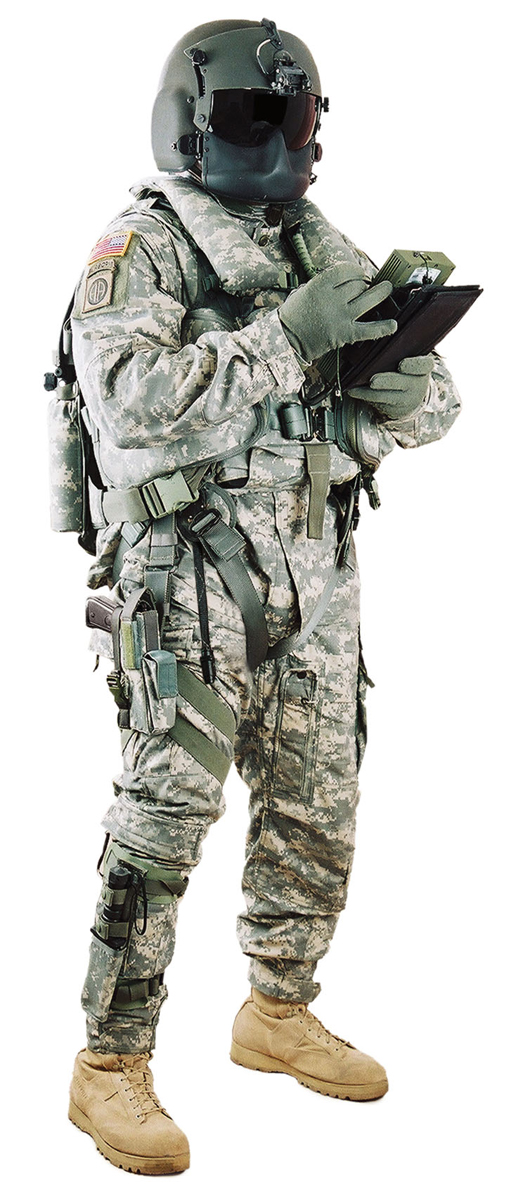
Air Warrior of the United States Army, part of the Future Combat Systems

Future Soldier was a multi-nation military project launched by the United States and its allies in the late 1990s.

According to the project, superiority to enemy ground forces would be achieved by equipping the average ground-based combat soldier with an integrated set of high-technology uniforms and equipment. These would be linked to an array of real-time and archived battlefield information resources. Soldiers would require not only enhanced versions of existing equipment (rifle, pistol, knife, helmet, armour, clothing), but also new forms of equipment that will become possible as new types and combinations of technologies become viable for battlefield deployment.

== Exhibition ==
Future Soldier Exhibition is an international exhibition mainly focused on the question of individual components of the "Dismounted Soldier" project, on the results of research, new technologies and materials, concepts and opportunities for international cooperation in the implementation of the integrated system of the soldier of the future and for the securing of the interoperability of its individual components in wartime and peacetime operations.

The last Future Soldier Exhibition took place in October 2012 in Prague. The event was organized under the aegis of the National Armaments Director within the Ministry of Defense of the Czech Republic.

== See also ==
- Supersoldier
- Infantryman 2000
- Future Soldier 2030 Initiative
- Ratnik (program)
- Wearable computer for military use
