= Soldier Integrated Protective Ensemble =

US Army soldier modernization program (1991–1993)

- SIPE helmet, February 1992
- Type: Soldier modernization program
- Place of origin: United States

Production history
- Designer: Natick Laboratories
- Designed: 1992
- Manufacturer: Dynamics Research Corporation; S-TRON; Geomet Technologies; Mechanical Technologies, Inc.

The Soldier Integrated Protective Ensemble (SIPE) program was a soldier modernization effort for combat ground troops of the United States Army. It focused on the areas of battery-powered items, such as individual soldier computers, heads-up displays, combat optics, aural boosting and protection, and microclimate conditioning. The SIPE system also included a modular clothing and equipment system. With SIPE, the Army began treating the individual soldier's combat equipment as one integrated system rather than an assortment of individual components.

The SIPE system was developed as a potential replacement for the standard Battle Dress Uniform (BDU), Battle Dress Overgarment (BDO), body armor (PASGT), and load bearing equipment (LBE, e.g. ALICE or IIFS) of past.

SIPE was succeeded by Land Warrior, and certain technologies developed under the SIPE program were migrated directly to LW.

== History ==
As a part of the Soldier Modernization Plan, the Soldier Integrated Protective Ensemble (SIPE) program was established by the Department of the Army as an Advanced Technology Demonstration (ATD) in 1990. (In early stages, it was referred to as an Advanced Technology Transition Demonstration, or ATTD.) The lead organization for the ATD was the US Army Natick Research, Development and Engineering Center (NRDEC). The SIPE system was intended to increase lethality, mobility, survivability, command and control, and overall protection of troops.

=== Agencies, organizations and units involved ===
Major Department of the Army organizations included the Office of the Surgeon General (ARIEM), Army Research Institute (ARI), the Institute for Defense Analysis (IDA), and the Test and Experimentation Command (TEXCOM).

The Training and Doctrine Command (TRADOC) players included the TRADOC System Manager-Soldier (TSM-S), the US Army Infantry School (USAIS), and the 4th Ranger Training Battalion.

The US Army Materiel Command's (AMC) agencies involved included the Communications and Electronics Command (CECOM), CECOM Night Vision and Electro Optics Directorate (NVEOD), the Chemical RD&E Center (CRDEC), the Human Engineering Laboratory (HEL), and the former US Army Laboratory Command's (LABCOM) Harry Diamond Laboratories (HDL) and Electronic Technology and Devices Laboratory (ETDL).

==== Natick-established SIPE elements ====
A SIPE Management Office was established within the Office of the Technical Director at Natick to plan, direct, execute and manage the SIPE ATD program. The SIPE office was structured and staffed based on the type of expertise required by the major components or subsystems of the SIPE system, i.e. the integrated helmet, clothing, weapon, microclimate conditioning, and soldier's computer subsystems. The SIPE manager and staff worked closely with other project personnel at Natick, as well as other RD&E centers and contractors, to ensure that the technology development efforts and the programmatic elements were closely coordinated and mutually supportive to achieve the goals of the SIPE program. All team members, including outside agencies, were matrixed to the SIPE manager in order to execute required actions.

Matrix management of a project of this scope and magnitude was difficult because of the large number of players and organizations involved. All information flowed centrally through, and all technical and programmatic decisions were made by the SIPE manager in coordination with other appropriate organizations. The SIPE office also worked closely with USAIS to ensure that the program met the anticipated requirements of the user.

Natick initially established an internal steering committee consisting of the Technical Director, the Associate Technical Director for Technology and the Directors of the Individual Protection and Soldier Sciences Directorates to oversee the project and provide guidance and direction. To assist in the management of this complex project a SIPE Master Schedule was developed. Team members provided a monthly update of the status of their efforts to Dynamics Research Corporation for consolidation.

=== Contractor support ===
An Advanced Planning Briefing to Industry (APBI) was held and proved to be extremely beneficial to governmental agencies, as well as industry, in terms of clarifying issues and exchanging information about requirements, capabilities, and technologies.

The SIPE ATD's Request For Proposal (RFP) was written primarily by the SIPE office and the Natick contracting office with input from the user community (specifically TRADOC and the US Army Infantry School). This resulted in awards to four major contractors:

- Dynamics Research Corporation, who was responsible for the MANPRINT/Human Factors/Systems Integration
- S-TRON, who provided the Integrated Headgear Subsystem
- Geomet Technologies, who provided the Advanced Clothing System
- Mechanical Technologies Inc., who provided the power subsystem

Dynamics Research Corporation also assisted in managing the complex SIPE ATD project by maintaining the SIPE Master Schedule Update. This document was updated monthly with the current status of various elements of the project. Individual plans and timelines were developed by individual team members. Dynamics Research Corporation had the integration responsibility but because of the centralized decision making, lacked the authority to direct the activities of other players.

=== Approach ===
The SIPE ATD consisted of a 6 phase approach:

- Phase I–Concept Development
- Phase II–Component Development
- Phase III–Integration
- Phase IV–Initial SIPE Evaluation/Modification
- Phase V–SIPE Procurement
- Phase VI–SIPE Demonstration/Evaluation

The six phases employed the use of technical assessments, human factors assessments, modeling and simulation, and field demonstrations. Each method evaluated different aspects of combat or technical performance.

=== Evaluation methodology ===
==== Technical assessments ====
Technical laboratory tests were conducted to measure those aspects of equipment performance which can best be captured in structured, scientifically controlled experiments, such as: acoustic testing of the helmet, physiological testing in the environmental chamber, flow rate and pressure drop test of the microclimate conditioning/power subsystem, and acoustic testing of the long range hearing device.

SIPE ATD technical assessments were published as formal reports:

- Preliminary Assessment of Three Conceptual SIPE Configurations vs. Standard, MOPP 2 and MOPP 4 Clothing Ensembles, dated 28 Sept 1992.
- Clothing Configurations in Controlled Chamber Configurations; Draft Test Report for the Soldier Integrated Protective Ensemble, dated 21 Dec. 1992
- Soldier Integrated Protective Ensemble (SIPE) Advanced Clothing Subsystem (ACS) Phase II/III Technical Report Vol. I & II, dated 20 Aug. 1993.

==== Human factors assessments ====
The human factors assessments of SIPE were designed and conducted to address MANPRINT-identified issues. These issues included man-machine interface, compatibility, comfort, sizing/fit, and mobility, as well as safety and training. Solving the aforementioned issues contributes significantly toward user acceptance and user-friendly soldier capabilities.

The US Army Research Institute for the Behavioral and Social Sciences (ARI) gathered data on SIPE during the field demonstrations and the results are published in Soldier Integrated Protective Ensemble (SIPE): The Soldiers Perspective, dated March 1993. Researchers requested soldier impressions on and suggestions for the SIPE equipment. Army Research Institute (ARI) personnel collected this data.

==== Modeling and simulation ====
Computer models can be used to address equipment, individual soldier, and unit performance under conditions which are too dangerous and/or too expensive to replicate in peacetime. The Institute for Defense Analysis (IDA) used the Janus Combat Model, performing a simulation of a "standard equipped" infantry squad and an "SIPE equipped" infantry squad versus each other. Simulations included squad missions for defense of a position, reconnaissance and ambush in day, night, and in non-NBC and NBC conditions. The simulation's purpose was to generate estimates on squad effectiveness (e.g. lethality, survivability, and sustainability) when using SIPE equipment.

In the early 1990s, existing modeling and simulation capabilities throughout the Army lacked the level of resolution and detail necessary to adequately model intricate individual soldier issues and capabilities. Critical characteristics such as fire and movement, intra squad communication, and acoustic detection were not modeled or were not represented to the degree required.

Modeling and simulation efforts on behalf of the SIPE ATD consisted primarily of technical analyses which supported:

- Construction of ATD operation scenarios and their definition of operational measures of effectiveness
- Formation of evaluation criteria for SIPE field demonstration exercises
- Concurrent development of new modeling and simulation tools including the Integrated Unit Simulation System (IUSS), and the Soldier System Hierarchical Model.

==== Field demonstrations ====
The demonstration highlight was a series of Situational Training Exercises (STXs) which assessed the ability of the SIPE squad performing standard dismounted infantry missions including Recon/Hasty Attack, Raid (Support by Fire), Ambush, and NBC Recon. The STX phase highlighted many of the tactical enhancements and unique new capabilities provided by SIPE.

During the field demonstration, assessments were conducted by the Test and Experimentation Command (TEXCOM) on target detection, target engagement (small arms firing) and land navigation. The TEXCOM Close Combat Test Directorate provided their assessment in "Test and Evaluation Report: Soldier Integrated Protective Ensemble (SIPE)" dated Feb. 1993. The US Army Infantry School's assessment is in "Draft Test Report for the Soldier Integrated Protective Ensemble Tactical Field Demonstration" dated Feb. 1993.

=== Timeline ===
- Initial Draft of SIPE System Evaluation Plan – 15 Oct 91
- Draft of SIPE System Evaluation Plan coordinated with USAIS, AMSAA, HEL – 15 Nov 91
- Final Draft of SIPE System Evaluation Plan Coordination – 1 Dec 91
- Receipt of all comments on Final Draft of SIPE System Evaluation Plan – 31 Dec 91
- Final SIPE System Evaluation Plan incorporated into SIPE ATTD Technology Development Plan – 15 Jan 92
- Ability/Function Capability Pair-Wise Comparison – 30 Apr 92
- Receipt of Technical Assessment Reports – Sep 92
- Receipt of Human Factors Assessment Reports – Sep 92
- Receipt of Technical Assessment Reports – Oct 92
- SIPE Operational Demonstration – Sep/Nov 92
- Receipt Human Factors Assessment Reports – Nov 92
- Receipt of Operational Assessment Report from USAIS – Feb/Apr 93
- Receipt of Simulation and Modeling Reports – Jan 93
- SIPE System Evaluation Report – Apr 93

=== Components ===
The SIPE system was designed for use by troops in temperate environments. The integrated headgear subsystem included improved communications and hearing and thermal sight weapon interface. Other subsystems included advanced clothing with protective gear; microclimate conditioning; and an individual soldier computer that provided enhanced capabilities in navigation and message management.

The Advanced Clothing Subsystem (ACS) begins with a Coolmax t-shirt next to the skin to help wick perspiration away from the skin surface. The next layer, which is worn when there is potential exposure to a chemical vapor threat, is a chemical vapor undergarment (CVU) made of cotton and polyester with carbon spheres. This is then covered by the Advanced Combat Uniform (ACU) (hypothetically replacing the Temperate Battle Dress Uniform) which is both flame resistant (PROBAN) and water repellant (Quarpel).

The Advanced Shell Garment (ASG), which completes the basic uniform components, is made of nylon/Gore-tex components along with additional water repellant treatment, and serves to protect against liquid chemical threat as well as serving as standard wet weather gear. Standard SIPE equipment also includes a new combat glove, a new non-butyl rubber chemical glove and a new Gore-tex lined combat boot with chemical protective gaiter to replace the green vinyl overboot. The new ballistic vest includes titanium plates to increase protective level and has built in pockets for carrying the standard rifleman's load. The SIPE system also includes a newly designed Load Bearing Component (LBC) for carrying some of the electronics integral to the system as well as some of the combat load.

Additionally, SIPE includes a portable cooling unit for delivering filtered ambient air to a torso microclimate vest (which fits in the Coolmax t-shirt) and to a protective mask to aid the soldier's ability to thermoregulate through convective and evaporative heat loss.

==== List of SIPE components ====
Sources:

==== Integrated Headgear Subsystem (IHS) ====
- Ballistic Shell Component (BSC), also named the IHS ballistic shell, is an open face helmet (OFH)
  - Ballistic Visor Subcomponent (BVS)
    - Ballistic Transparency (BT) – 2.5 mm (0.098 in) thick thermal formed sheet of polycarbonate
    - Eye Protection – Ballistic, laser eye protection
    - Electro-Optics (EOS) Vision Enhancement Receiver Group and Display Optics
      - GEN III image intensifier tube, Hughes cathode-ray tube (CRT) and glass lenses for the helmet mounted display
      - Driver electronics and power supply (carried in a backpack on the Load-Bearing Component)
  - Communications Subcomponent (COMS)
    - A bone conduction microphone (mounted within the brow pad of the SLS)
    - Two electronic earplugs (one for each ear), used for aural protection and communications
    - A pre-amp and ambient sound listening microphone with wiring
    - Connector for the COMS module (earned in backpack) interface
  - Suspension Liner Subcomponent (SLS)
    - Modified cradle suspension (with rigid, foam padded headband)
      - An adjustable ratchet nape strap for increased stability along with a drawstring crown adjustment and pad
      - Standard two-point chin strap with a webbing chin cup and adjustment buckles on both sides
  - Respiratory Protective Device (RPD) – A modified XM-44 protective mask that includes:
    - Reduced profile lenses and modified suspension
    - Hydration Liquid Nutrient (HLN) water drinking tube, hand pump, and connectors for mask and canteen
    - A mouthpiece inside mask, powered voicemitter for face-to-face communications
    - Double-shirted butyl rubber hood (interfaces with the XM-44 mask and Advanced Clothing Subsystem)
- IHS power supply, or Power Supply Component (PSC)
  - Main Power Supply Interface – Relay for lithium batteries to connect with the headgear, EOS, and COMS components
  - Backup Power Supply – A supplementary battery pack that is housed within the EOS backpack and carried on the Load Bearing Component of the ACS
IHS Ballistic Shell Component (BSC) with Woodland camouflage cover

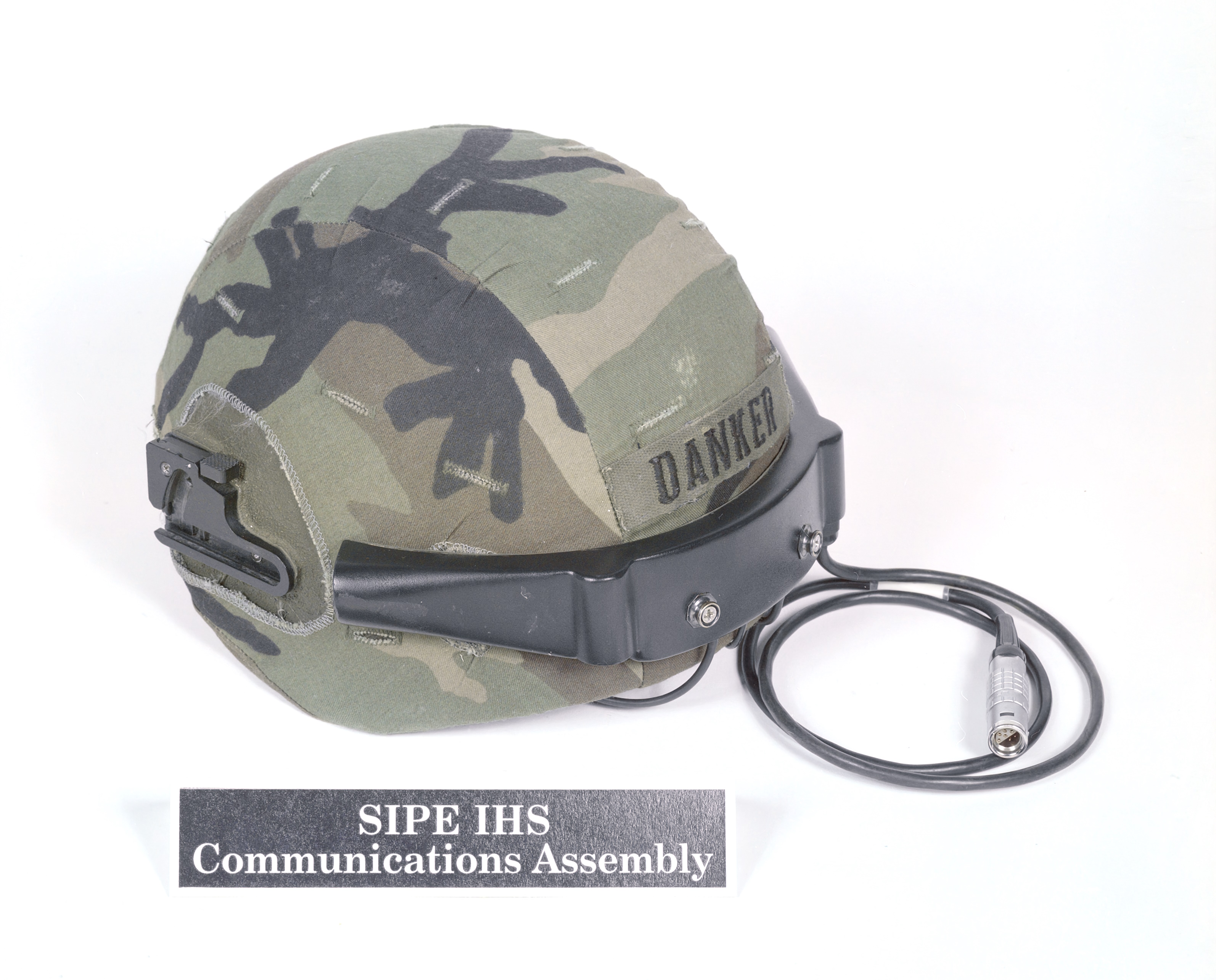
IHS Communications Assembly mounted onto rear side of IHS ballistic shell

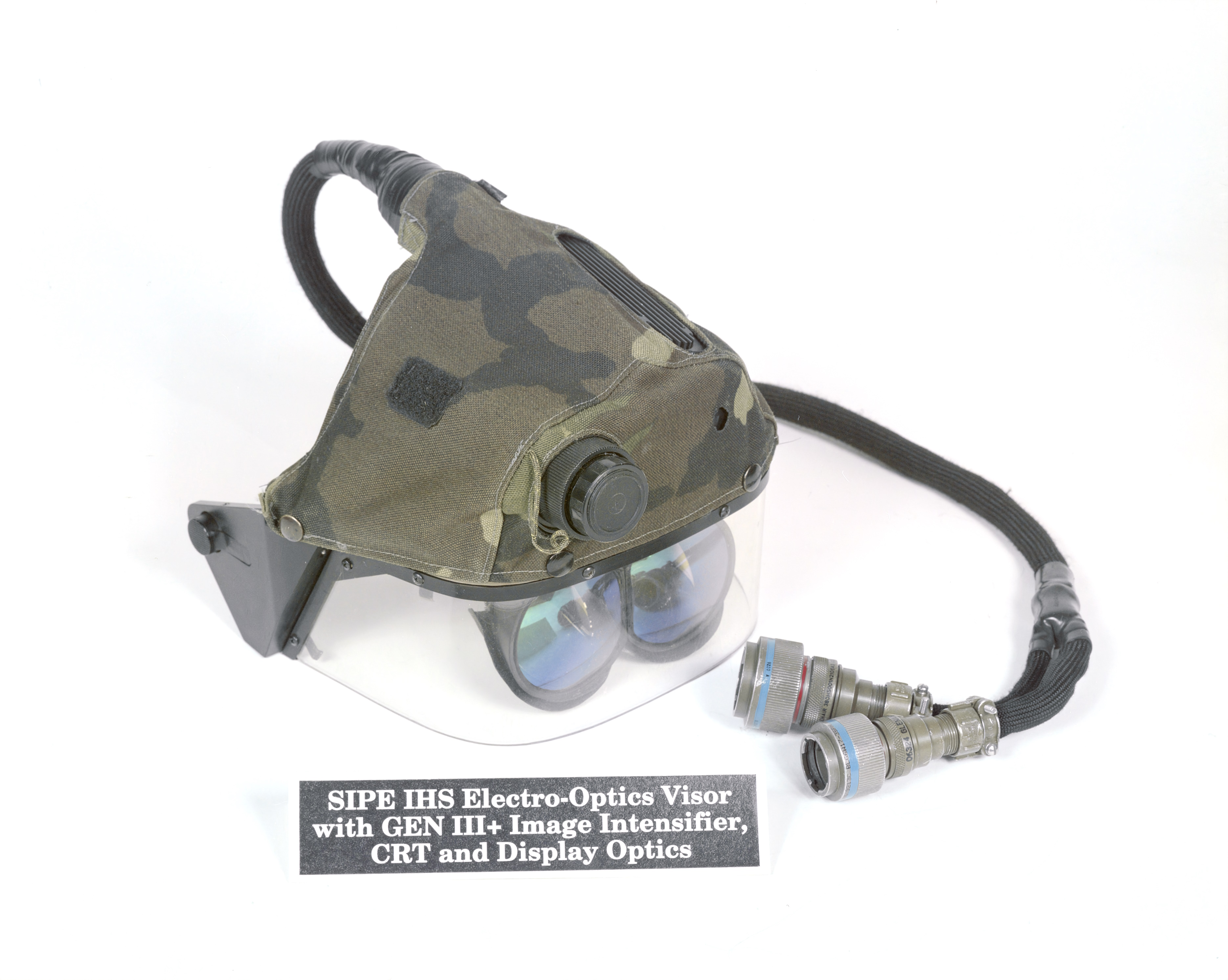
IHS BVS with Electro-Optics (EOS) components (e.g. GEN III+ image intensifier, and cathode ray tube (CRT), used for heads-up display, or HUD)

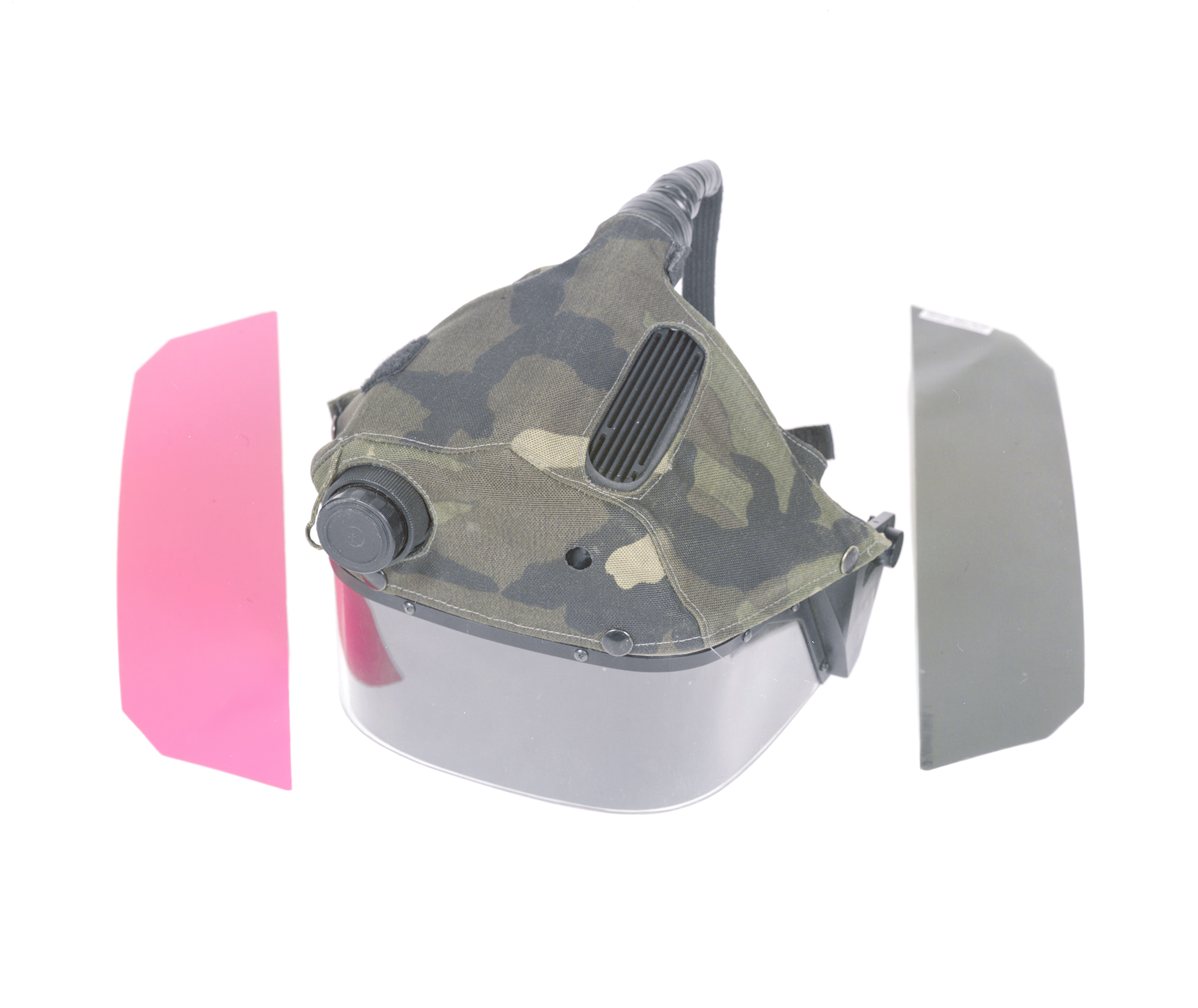
IHS Ballistic Visor Subcomponent (BVS) with red and gray tinted Ballistic Transparency (BT) screens

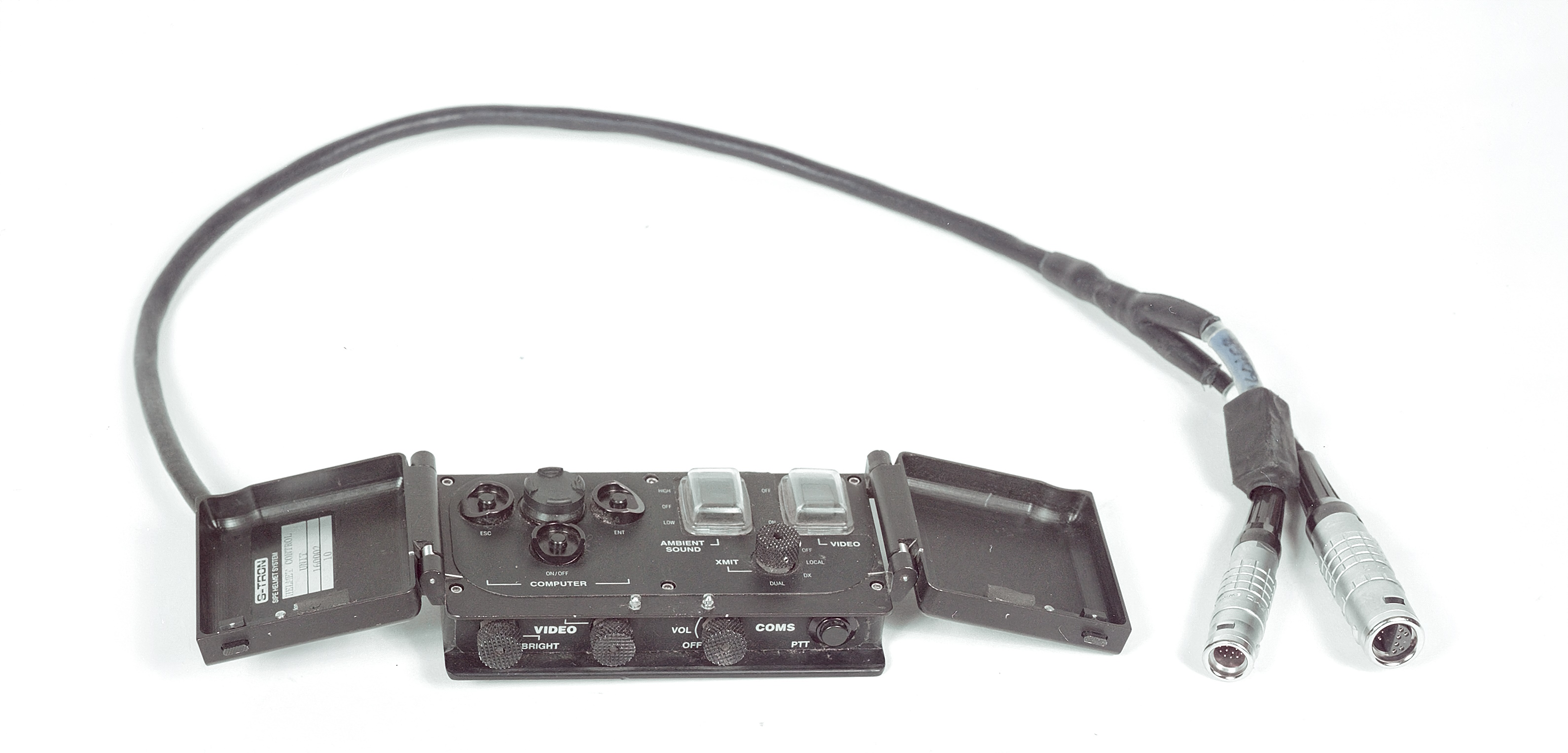
IHS Helmet Control Unit (HCU), opened

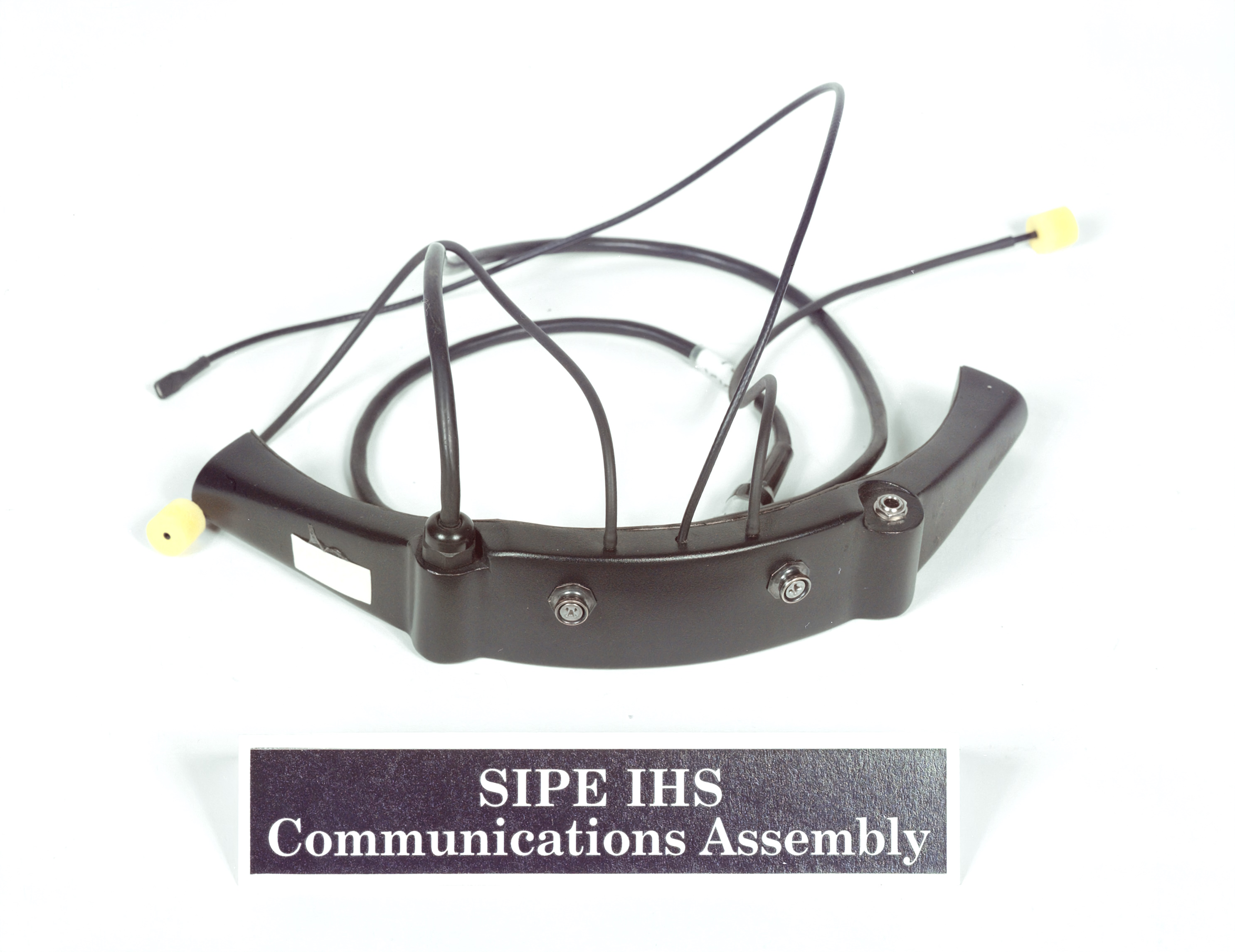
IHS Communications Assembly (COMS)

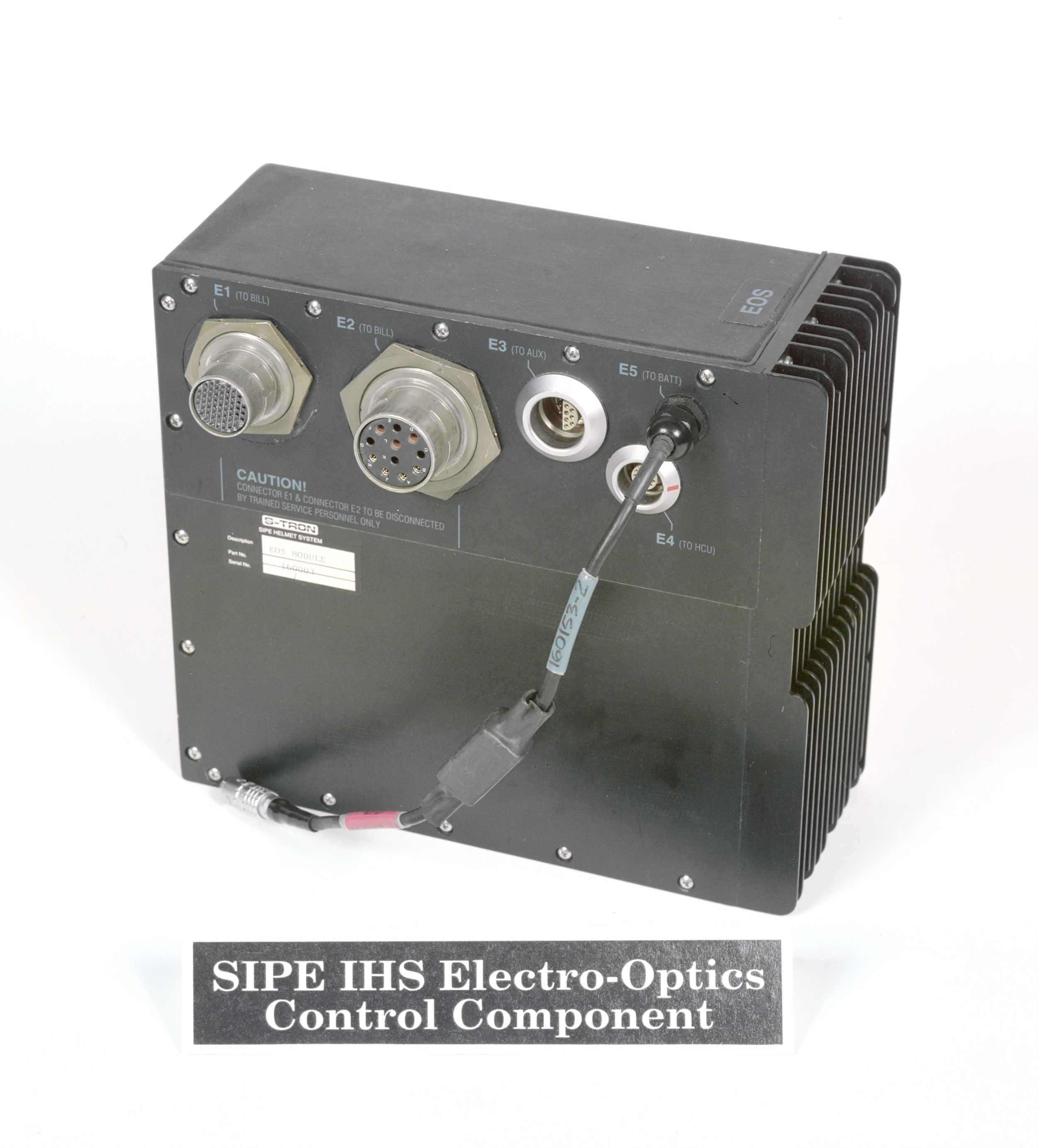
IHS Electro-Optics (EOS) control component

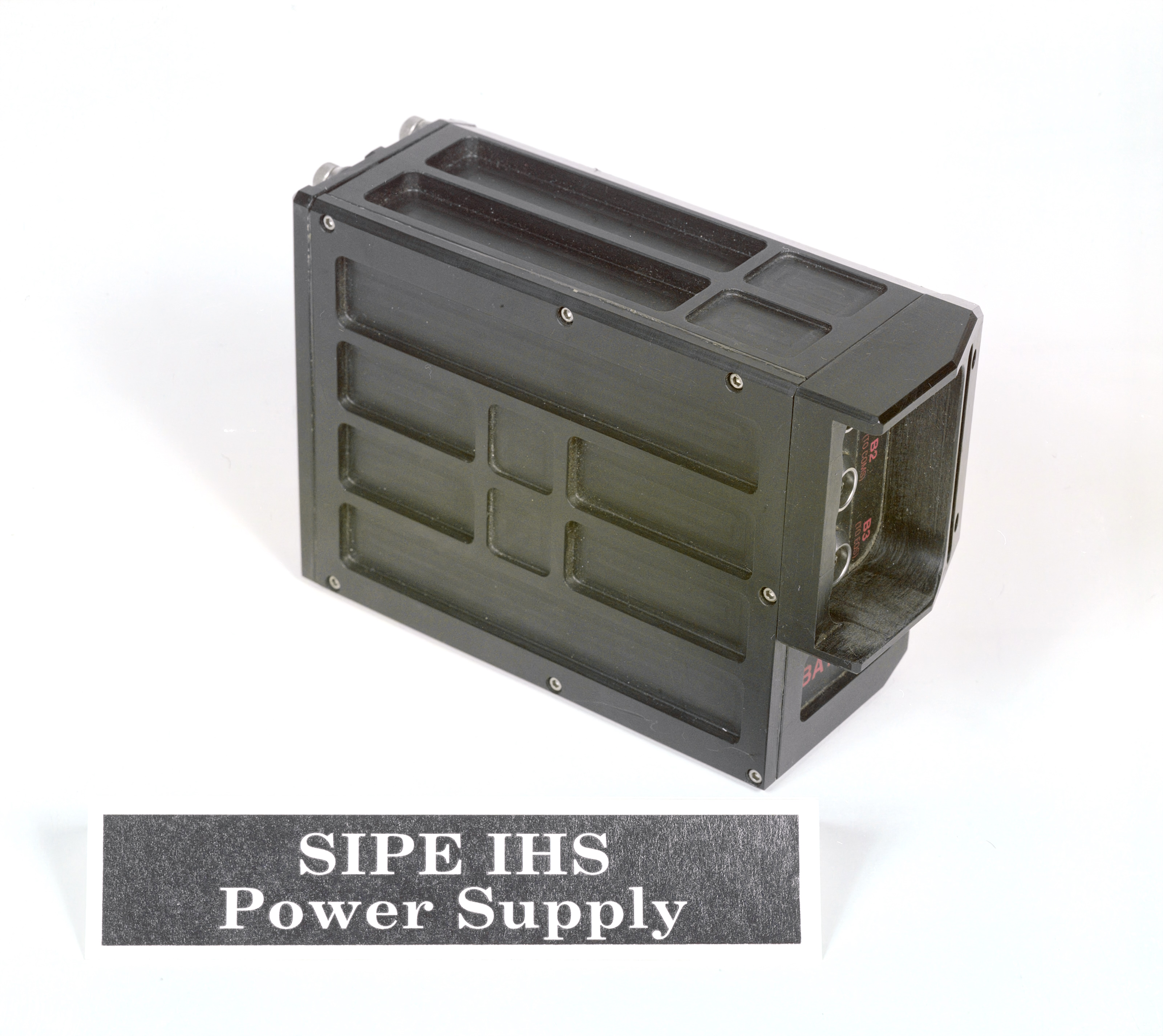
IHS Power Supply Component (PSC)

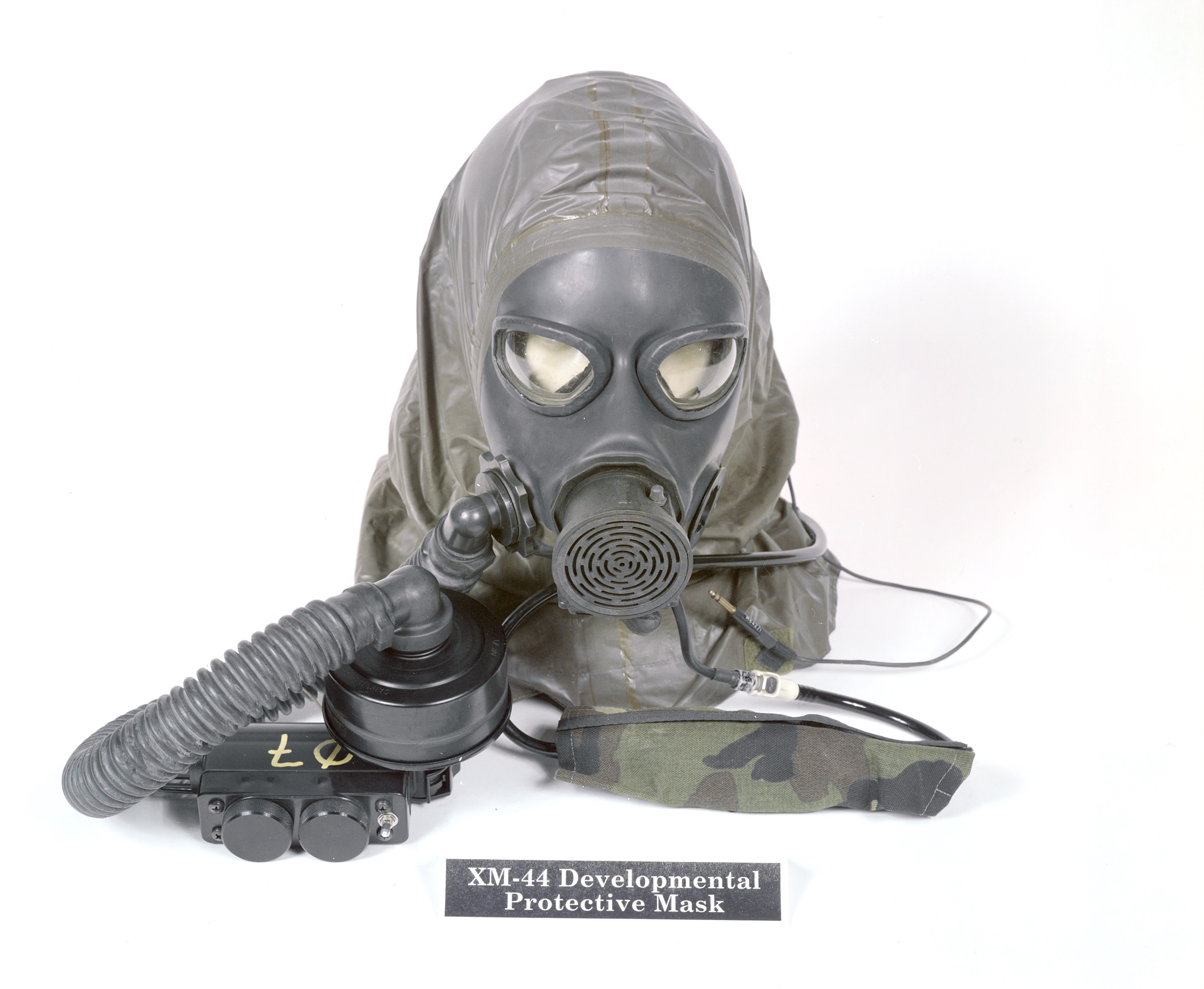
Respiratory Protective Device, modified XM-44 mask, with components (e.g. MCC filter, tube and interface, the Hydration Liquid Nutrient (HLN) water drinking tube, and the butyl rubber hood)

==== Advanced Clothing Subsystem (ACS) ====
- Chemical Vapor Undergarment (CVU)
- Advanced Combat Uniform (ACU) – Jacket/trouser
- Advanced Shell Garment (ASG) – Jacket/trouser
- Passive cooling T-shirt – Coolmax material
- Load Bearing Component (LBC) – Houses the MCC/PS
- Ballistic Protective Vest (BPV), also named the Integrated Body Armor
- Handwear – Combat glove and chemical protective glove
- Footwear – Combat boot and chemical protective gaiter
- Waste Management System, a personal adsorptive device (PAD)
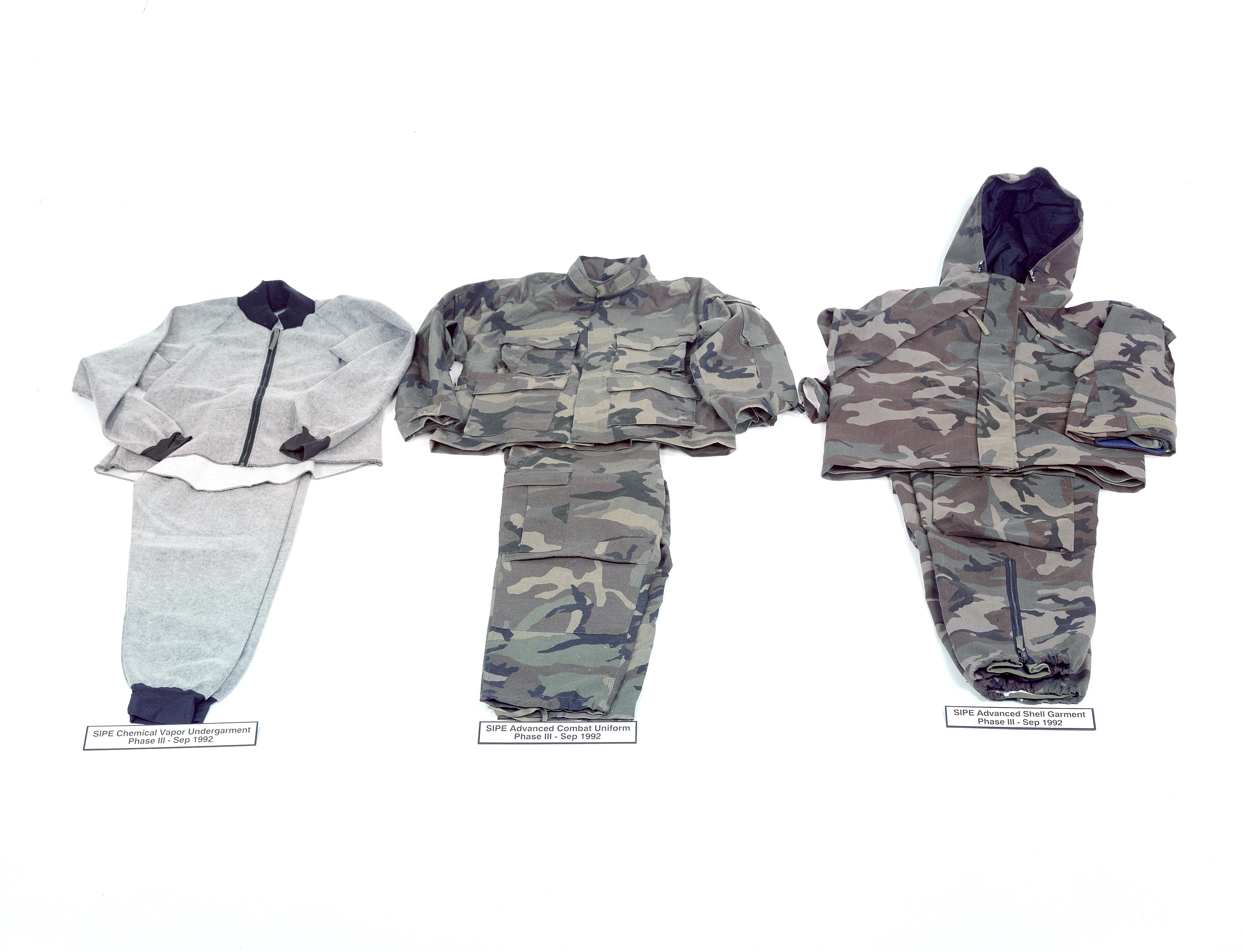
Advanced Clothing System (ACS), consisting of CVU, ACU, and ASG

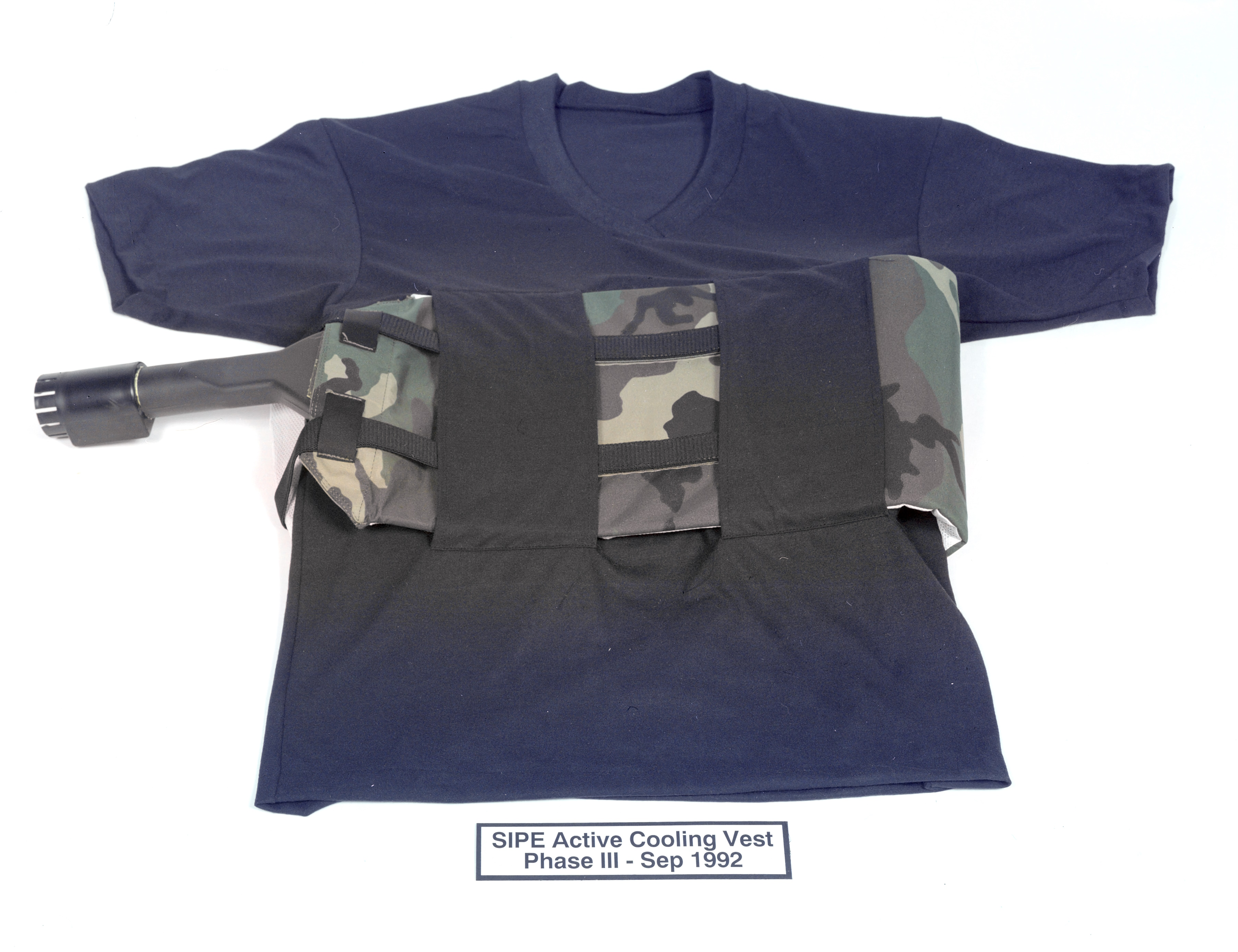
Coolmax t-shirt with inserted Active Cooling Vest (ACV)

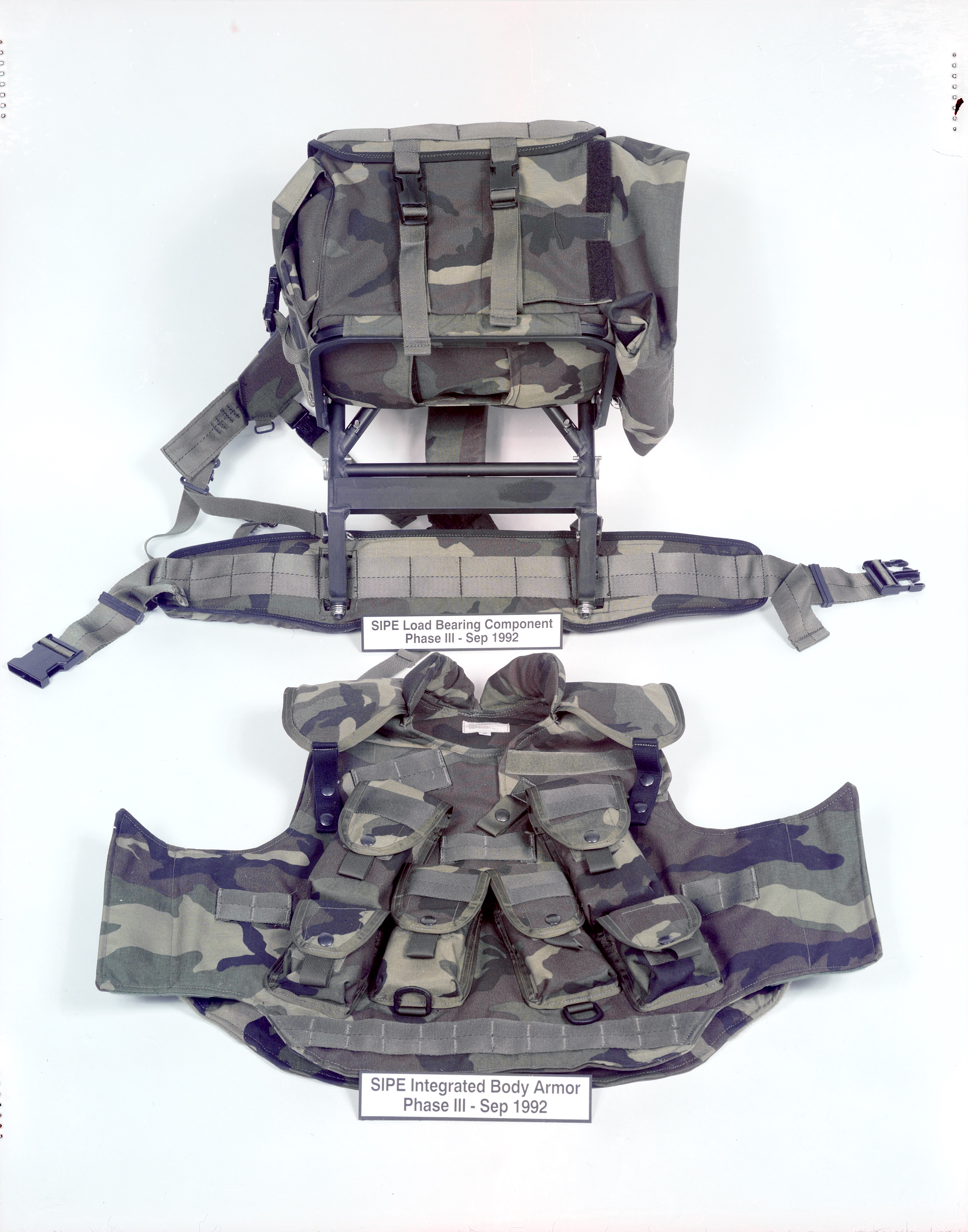
Load Bearing Component (LBC), and the Ballistic Protective Vest (BPV) is labeled as 'Integrated Body Armor'

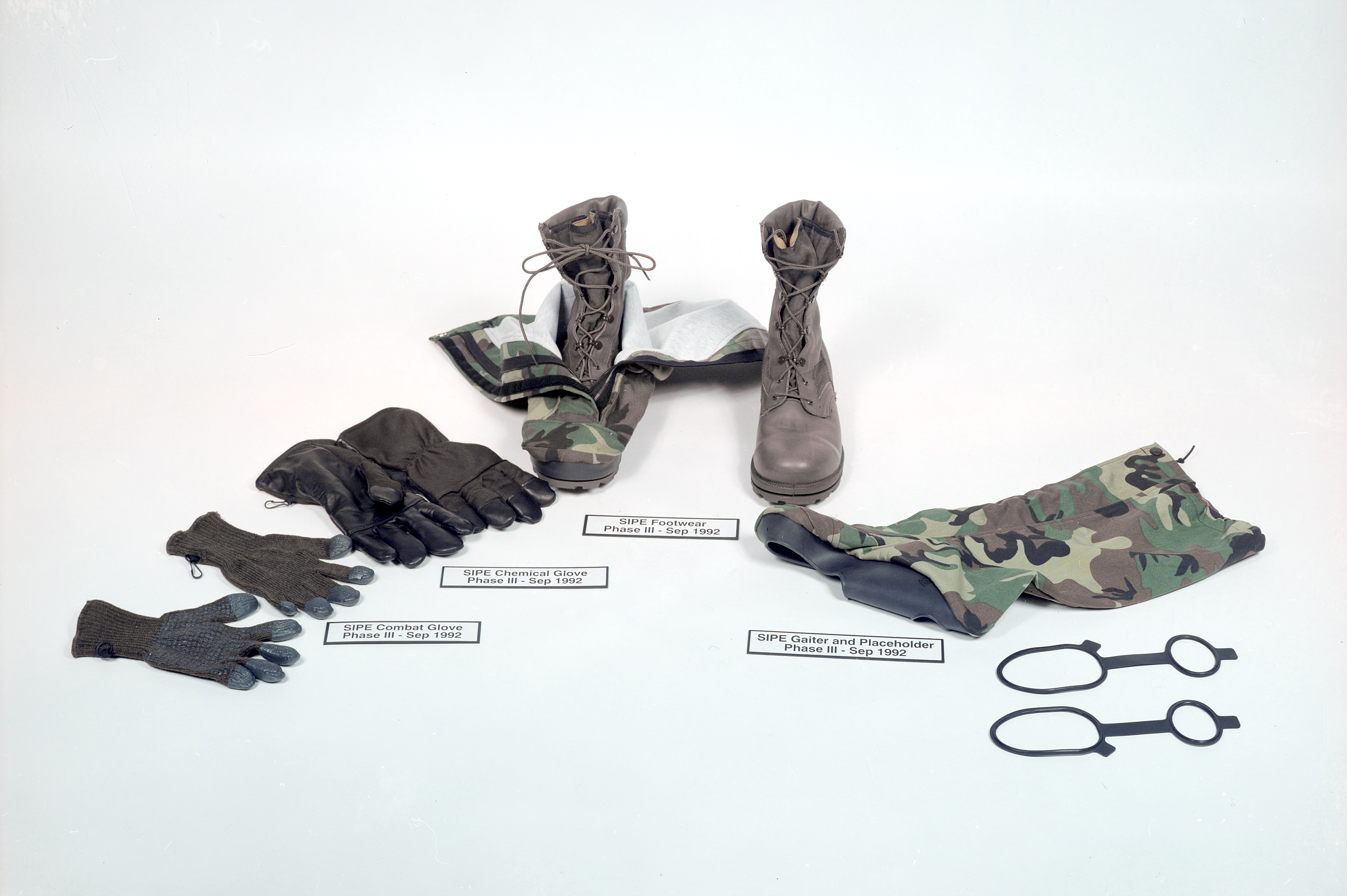
Handwear and footwear items, consisting of: combat gloves, NBC gloves, brown combat boots, and NBC gaiters with slippage keepers

==== Microclimate Conditioning/Power Subsystem (MCC/PS) ====
- Active Cooling Vest (ACV)
- MCC Blower
- MCC Filter
- Main power source (Pair of BA 5590 or BA 6590 U lithium batteries)
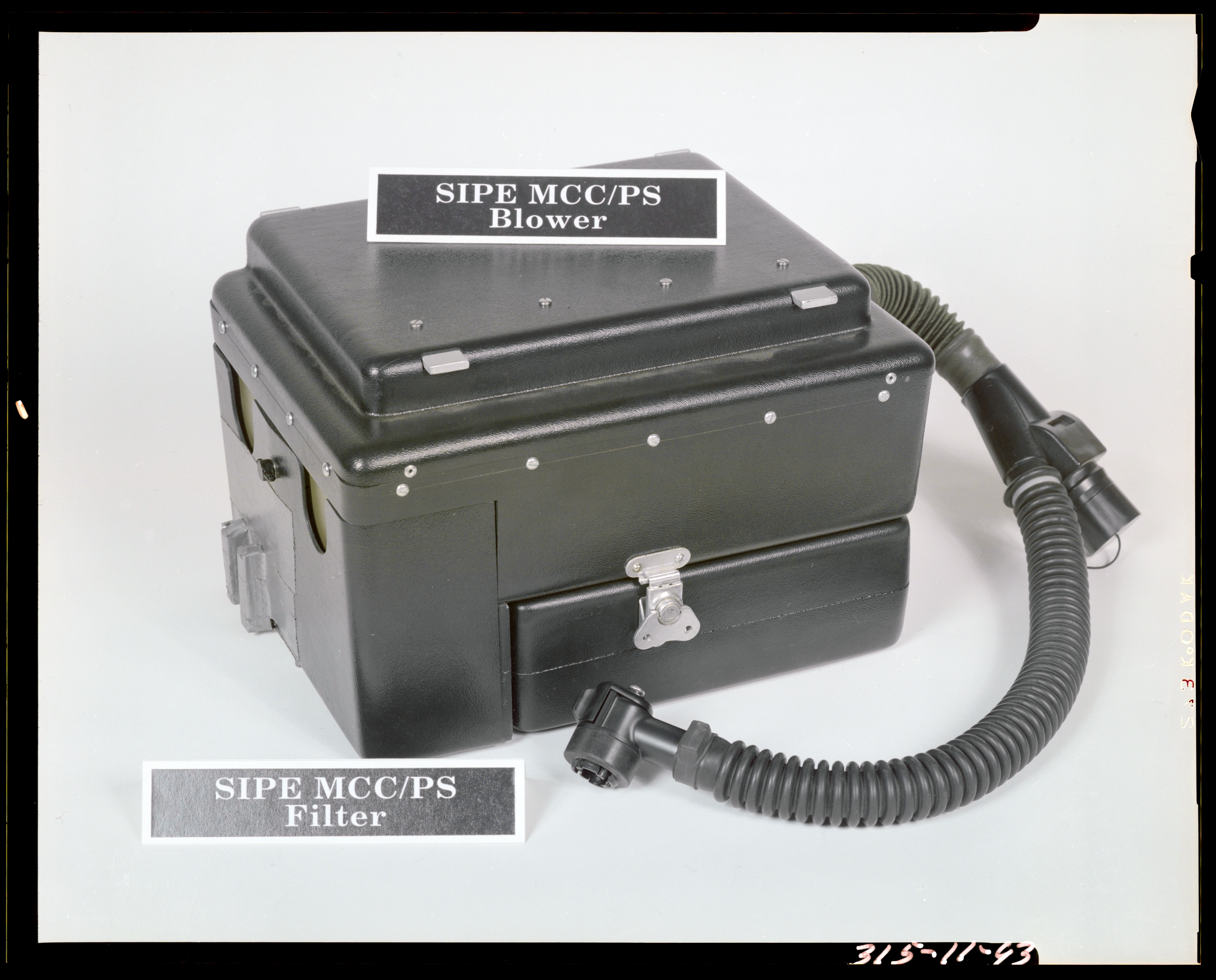
MCC/PS container

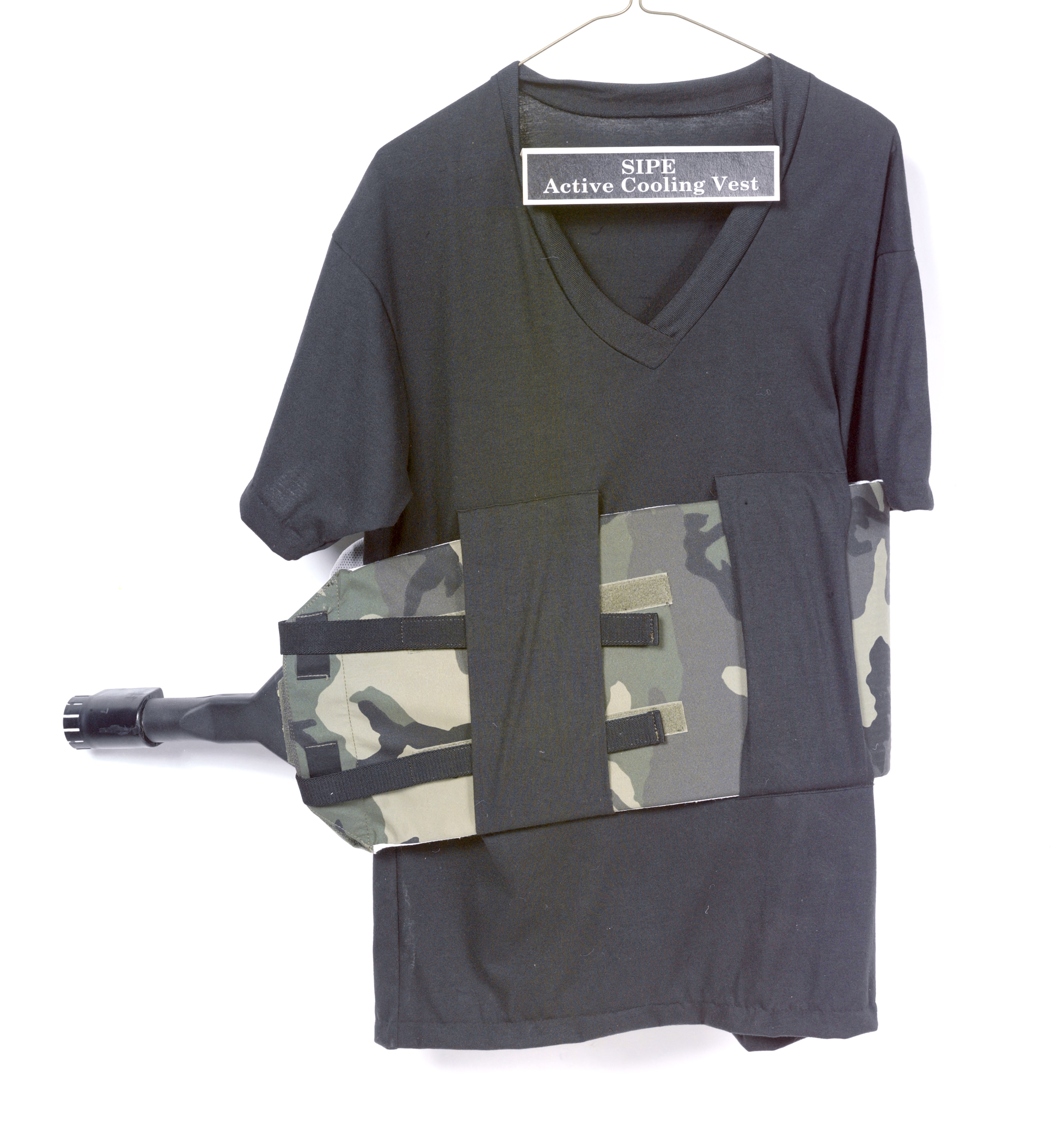
Active Cooling Vest (ACV) inserted in Coolmax t-shirt

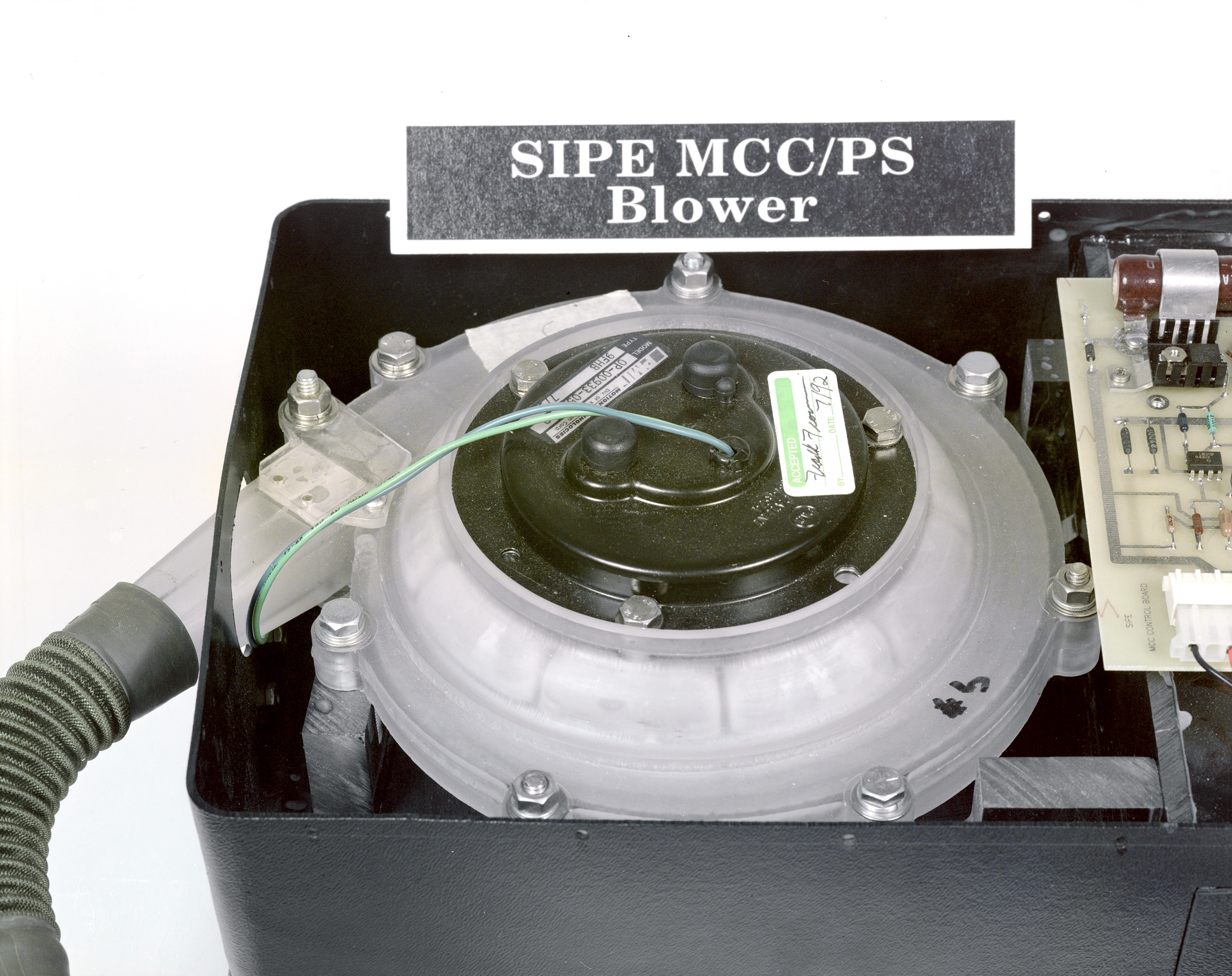
Close-up of MCC blower

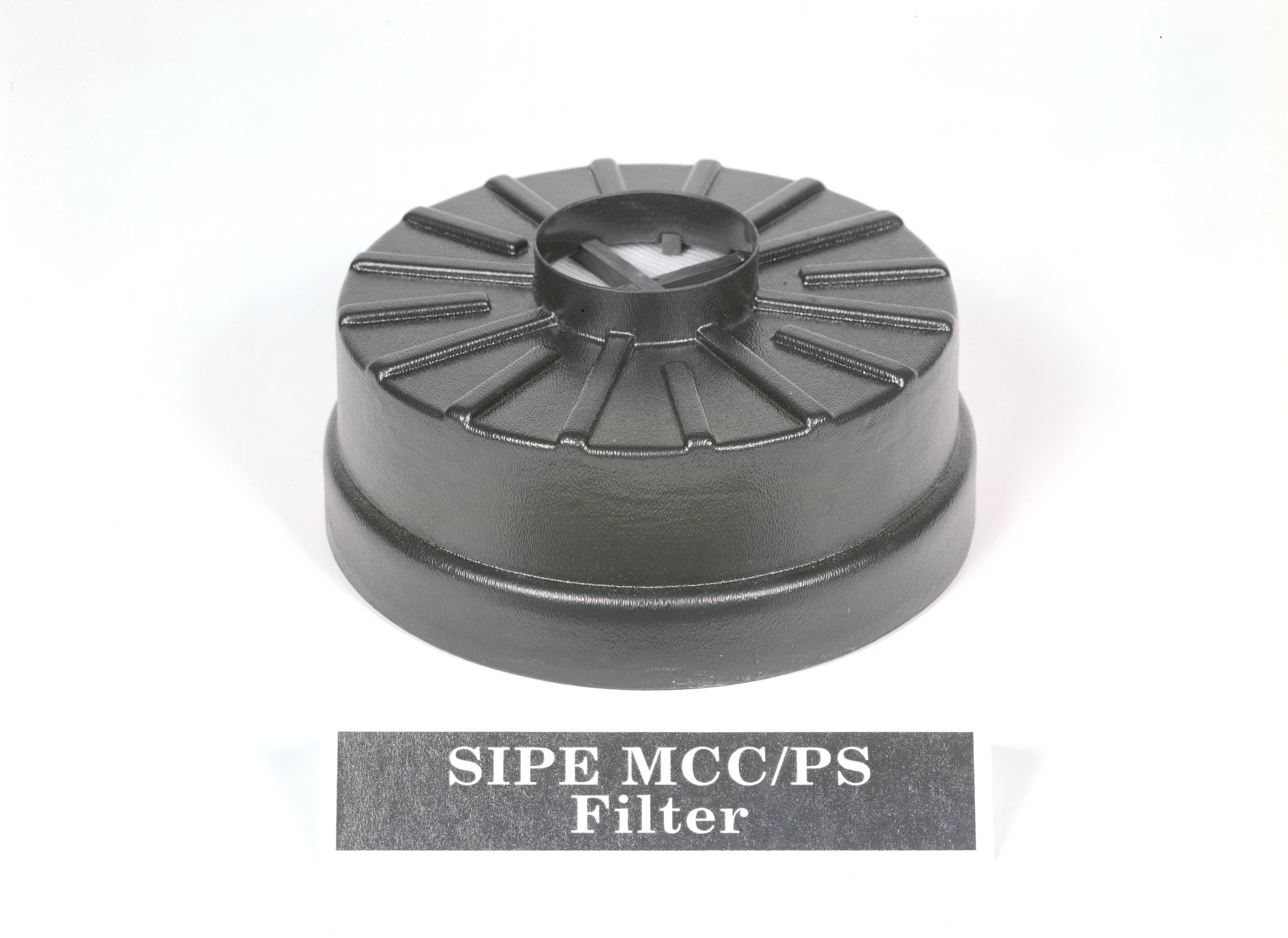
The MCC filter

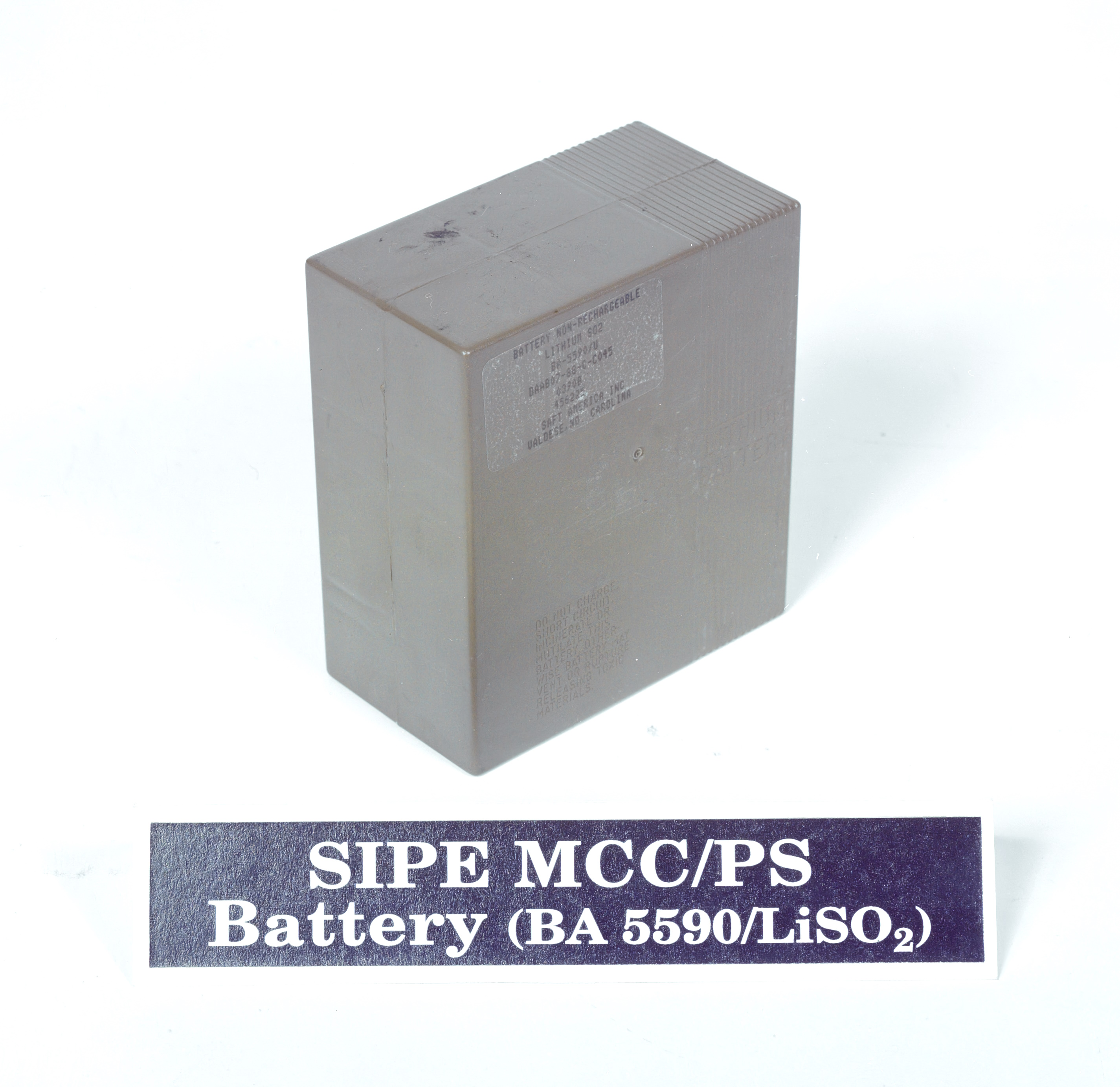
BA 5590 / LiSO_{2} battery

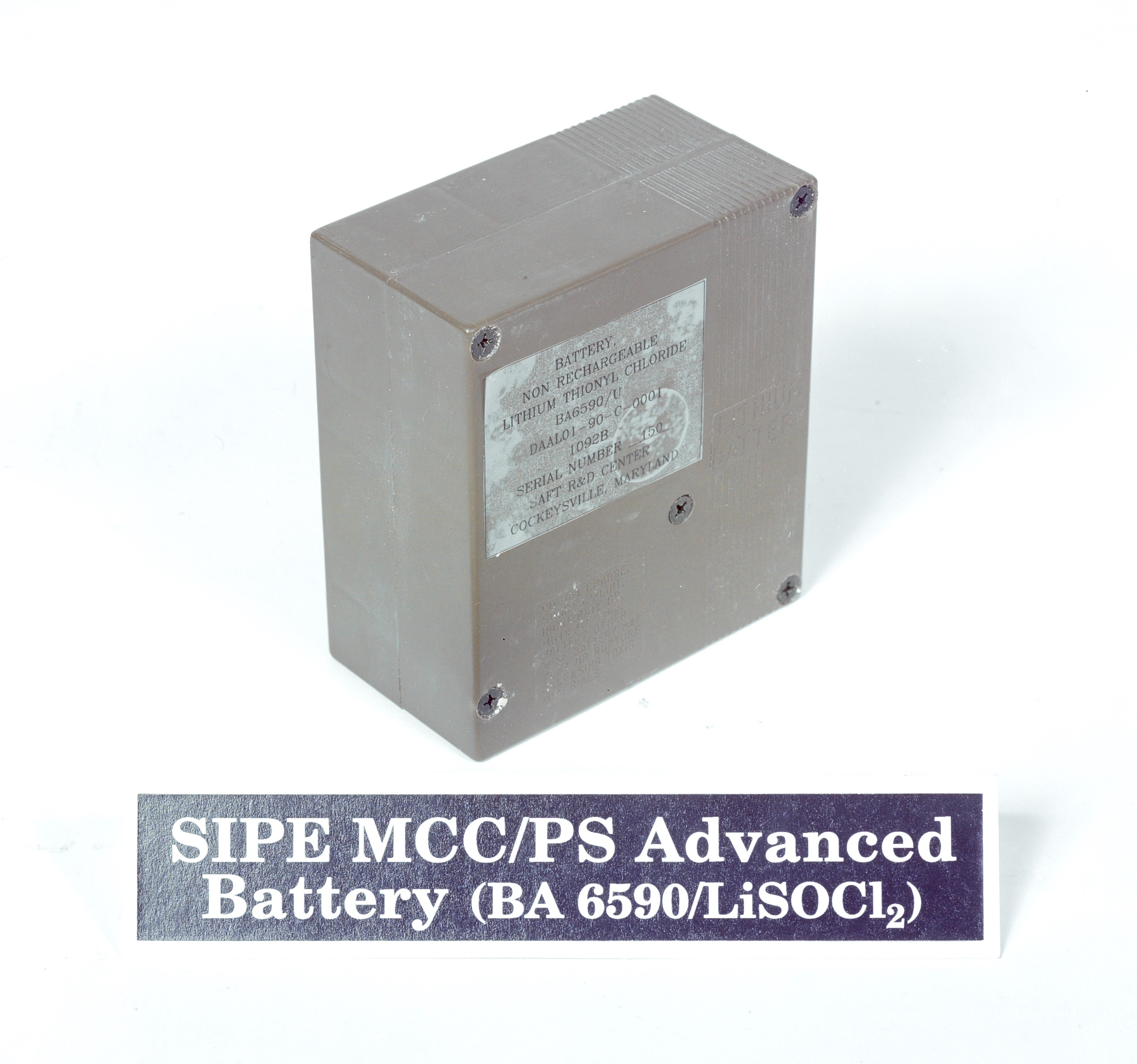
Advanced BA 6590 / LiSOCl_{2} battery

==== Weapon System (WS) ====
- M16A2 (standard infantryman's rifle)
- Low cost uncooled sensor prototype (LOCUSP) thermal sight, or Thermal Weapon Sight (TWS)
- AIM-1D infrared laser aiming light
- Long range hearing device
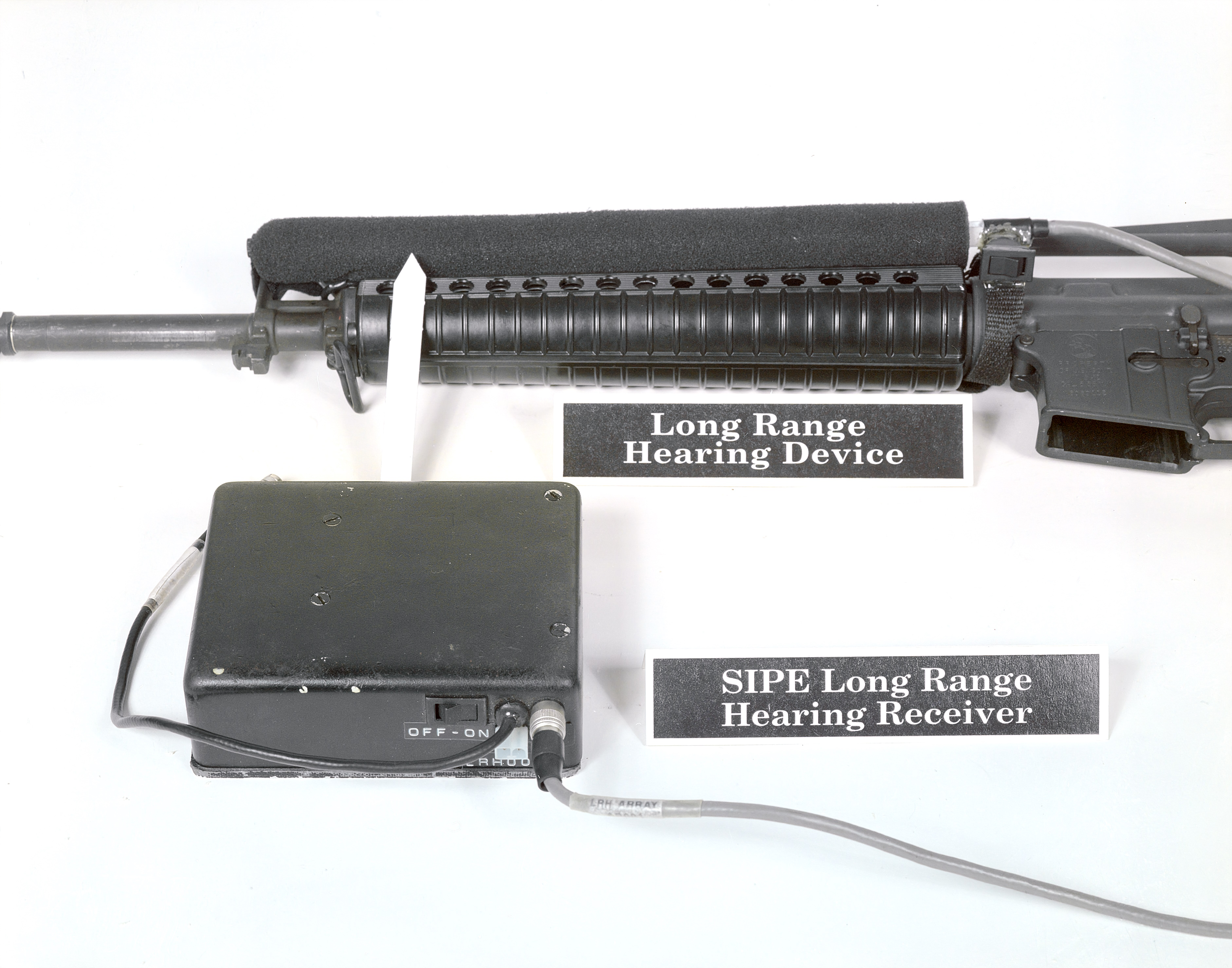
SIPE long range hearing device connected to long range hearing receiver

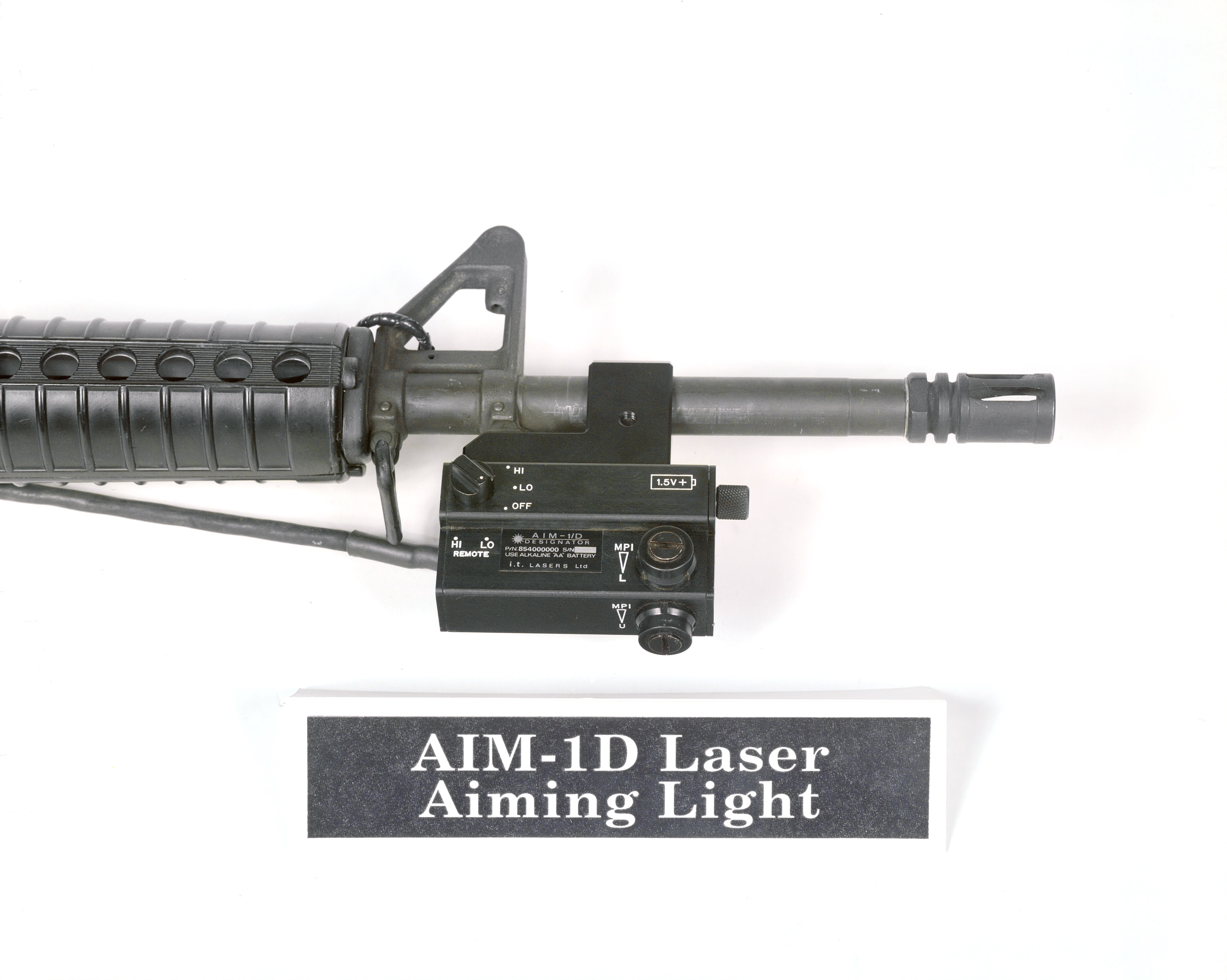
AIM-1D infrared laser aiming light

==== Individual Soldier Computer (ISC) ====
- 386SX/80mb hard drive
- Global Positioning System (GPS)/digital mapping
- Message management/reporting
- Video capture (thermal and video)

== System testing ==
=== Doriot Climatic Chambers tests ===
A test was conducted using the Doriot Climatic Chambers at Natick Laboratories. The human thermoregulation qualities of the standard Temperate BDU and Battle Dress Overgarment were compared to the SIPE's Advanced Combat Uniform and Advanced Shell Garment & Chemical Vapor Undergarment components.

The environmental chamber study compared physiological responses of volunteers exercising in MOPP 0, MOPP 1, and MOPP 4 with equivalent SIPE configurations, including SIPE 4 with and without ambient air microclimate cooling (MCC). Responses to all uniforms were compared over 100 minutes of continuous treadmill walking at 30.0 °C, 50% rh. Responses to MOPP 4 and SIPE 4 with no cooling were also compared over 100 minutes at 18.5 °C, 50% rh. Responses to MOPP 4 and SIPE 4 MCC were compared over four hours of intermittent work-rest cycles at 30.0 °C, 50% rh. There were no differences between MOPP 0 and SIPE 0, MOPP 1 and SIPE 1, and MOPP 4 and SIPE 4 with no cooling (in both environments). Core temperature, skin temperature, heat storage, and heart rate were lower in SIPE 4 MCC than in MOPP 4; while evaporative cooling was greater in SIPE 4 MCC than in MOPP 4. Three volunteers completed the 4-hour tests in SIPE 4 MCC with similar advantageous trends apparent from the cooling. It is concluded that the SIPE clothing did not increase thermal strain compared to equivalent MOPP levels, and MCC, (although increasing uniform weight by approximately 10 kg (22 lb)) reduced thermal strain at 30.0 °C.

The test subjects consisted of eight male soldiers, selected from members of the Natick test volunteer platoon or recruited from military units at other posts. There were 11 experimental tests in standard MOPP and SIPE configurations. This research compared the thermoregulatory responses and performance of male soldiers wearing MOPP and SIPE clothing in equivalent NBC and non-NBC configurations during moderate exercise in two environments. The equivalent clothing levels were based on the level of protection against NBC threat. The test environments were a warm (30.0 °C, 86 °F, 50% rh) environment with minimal dry heat loss in MOPP 4, and a cool (18.5 °C, 65 °F, 50% rh) environment which allowed increased dry and evaporative heat loss in MOPP 4. Experiments in the warm environment included SIPE with ambient cooling in one MOPP 4 equivalent configuration. These experiments provided comparative information which determined if heat strain was reduced and performance was improved in soldiers wearing the developmental SIPE system relative to the standard MOPP system. Because the clothing system is developmental with ongoing refinements, there are potential differences in the fabric weights, and amounts of water repellant and flame resistant chemicals used in the fabric for these experiments and the clothing worn by volunteers at the Ft. Benning field demonstration.

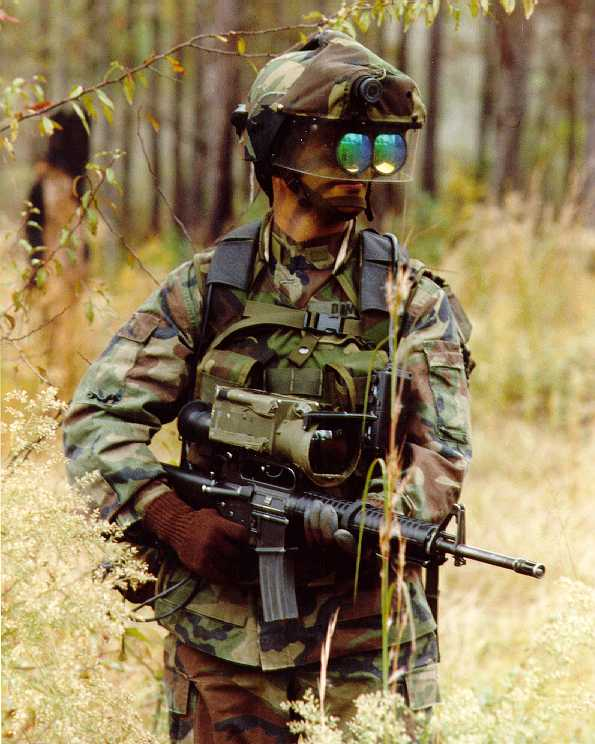
SIPE squad leader ensemble

=== Fort Benning demonstrations ===
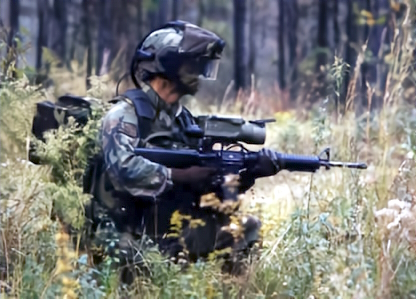
SIPE squad leader scanning for targets

From September 1992 through November 1992, the field portion of the SIPE ATD was conducted at Fort Benning, Georgia.

==== Training and field exercises ====
The SIPE field demonstration was divided into separate but interrelated phases, contained approximately within a two month time frame. Soldier performance was measured, observed, and compared during both day and night activity, and in both SIPE and standard uniform and equipment. Training focused primarily on the technical use of the various elements of the SIPE system; little time was spent on integration of the equipment into an operational mode. Training was followed immediately by testing on target detection, small arms fire, and land navigation. The final weeks included STXs, where for the first time the SIPE soldiers used the SIPE equipment in a tactical mode.

==== Data collection ====
The Test and Experimentation Command (TEXCOM) Close Combat Test Directorate collected individual task performance-data, and the US Army Infantry School (USAIS) assessed collective task performance data. As a technical advisory service to the SIPE ATD, US Army Research Institute for the Behavioral and Social Sciences (ARI) personnel collected data on soldier impressions on and suggestions for the SIPE equipment.

During all SIPE equipment training and the events that followed, the ARI administered questionnaires, and, conducted both formal and informal interviews with the test soldiers. The collected information of test soldier input was in the form of comments, written questionnaire responses, as well as tape recorded interview data. ARI's collecting of data spanned the entire time period from soldier selection through initial familiarization, operational training, the individual task events, and the final tactical exercises.

==== Results ====
The field testing of the SIPE ATD was limited. The subjects, in some cases, did not have adequate time to familiarize themselves with the equipment prior to testing. An example is the indirect view rifle sight. The subjects did not determine the best technique for using the indirect viewing until after the rifle range accuracy test. Furthermore, the test was conducted in only one environment. Capabilities in urban, desert, or arctic environments were not studied.

== Outcome ==
The SIPE, configured as a head-to-toe individual fighting system, demonstrated considerable potential for enhanced soldier capabilities and operational effectiveness. The enhanced communications capability and thermal sight on the rifle, as well as some items of clothing, were deemed very acceptable; other items were rejected or insufficiently tested. It was concluded that further testing would be beneficial.

Although the project was initially focused toward an "integrated protective ensemble", the end result was only a small advance in passive protection, but a large increase in offensive and active defensive capability.

=== Conclusions ===
A group in the Army Science Board (ASB) conducted an 'ad hoc study' which determined that technologies from SIPE appearing to be low risk included the squad radio, GPS with inertia augmentation, the Continuous Positive Airway Pressure (CPAP) blower for the Nuclear, Biological and Chemical (NBC) mask, the AIM light, and the protective vest.

The squad radio and GPS with inertia augmentation provided a dramatic improvement in C3I (command, control, communications, and intelligence). The ASB study noted that, although all soldiers should be equipped with the radio, not all may need GPS for a squad to function well. The CPAP blower for the NBC mask drew rave reviews from the soldiers. Although the work of breathing 5 centimeters (2 in) of water across the filter of the mask is hardly noticeable at rest, soldiers reported an extreme sense of dyspnea or breathlessness while exercising; the blower completely eliminated this problem. The utility of the AIM light, which is currently available, was reconfirmed. The protective vest was far more comfortable than the currently fielded model due to its articulating structure. The vest is one pound heavier than the currently fielded model and was recommended to be reduced in weight.

According to the ASB study, two devices—the thermal sight and aural augmentation—were clearly proven in concept but were not ready for transition to TEISS (The Enhanced Integrated Soldier System). The thermal sight was well liked by the testing soldiers; however, they stated they had inadequate training time prior to the weapon accuracy tests and, therefore, the results may not have reflected the sight's full capabilities. In addition, a fielded weapon sight would require substantial weight reduction.

Enhanced aural augmentation proved to be an exciting development. The way it was tested proved revealing in the interaction between tactics and doctrine. One squad of soldiers found that the noise of walking made the aural enhancement distracting at best; however, a squad conducting a raid was able to eavesdrop on the opposing forces' defensive plan with predictable results. An analogy is the use of binoculars, which are invaluable, but which are a great hinderance if used constantly. The Army does not have the intuitive knowledge nor the experience to maximize the potential of much of the novel technology being demonstrated in SIPE. Further work with a two-band aural augmentation may make the device useful in both of the above described scenarios.

SIPE had some equipment that did not work well. These included the helmet display, boots, and gloves. The ASB study group stated that all of the items had potential and should be reworked into future demonstrations.

The group suggested that a battalion-sized early deployment force be equipped with a first generation squad radio, AIM lights, and GPS.

== Land Warrior program ==
SIPE was succeeded by Land Warrior, and certain technologies developed under the SIPE program were migrated directly to LW.

== See also ==
- Future Force Warrior
- Nett Warrior
