= Tactel =

Tactel can mean:

- Tactel (short for tactile element) - a single sensing point on a tactile sensor array
- Tactel (fiber), a trademarked brand of synthetic fiber produced by Invista
