= HPTi =

IT consulting firm in the United States of America

High Performance Technologies, Inc.
- Type: Private
- Industry: Federal IT Consulting
- Founded: 1991
- Defunct: 2011
- Fate: Acquired by Dynamics Research Corporation
- Headquarters: Reston, Virginia, USA
- Key people: Timothy P. Keenan
- Number of employees: 350+
- Website: www.hpti.com

High Performance Technologies, Inc. (HPTi) was an IT consulting firm based in Reston, Virginia. Founded in 1991, the company is notable for several high-profile solutions for the federal government. For instance, the company developed a Linux-based supercomputer for the National Oceanic and Atmospheric Administration (NOAA) that ranked as the 8th fastest supercomputer in the world in 2002. HPTi also developed the Secure Payment System for the Department of the Treasury - a system that processes payments totaling $1.5 trillion annually. HPTi was recently in the news for winning the American Business Award for Best Executive (Computer Hardware or Services in 2007), Best Technical Professional (2008 and 2009), Best Support Staffer (2007) and Best Overall Company (2009). HPTi was wholly acquired by Dynamics Research Corporation in June, 2011.

HPTi was the prime contractor on the Department of Defense's (DoD) premier applied research contracts—the User Productivity Enhancement, Technology Transfer and Training (PETTT) contract for the DoD's High Performance Computing Modernization Office (HPCMO). HPTi collaborates with government labs and coordinates research universities and private companies of the PETTT team to produce meaningful and timely science and engineering solutions for America's warfighters. The team includes Texas Advanced Computing Center, Pittsburgh Supercomputing Center, and 19 other university and industry partners. The contract's objectives include collaboration, HPC tool development, and enhanced productivity.

In 2009, HPTi was awarded the Medallion of Excellence by the Senate Productivity and Quality Award for Virginia. The process award recognizes companies with mature, well-deployed, and successful business processes and procedures. HPTi was awarded the Plaque for Progress in Performance Excellence for three years before obtaining the program's highest honor. The program emulates the Baldrige Award - the U.S. presidential award for performance excellence.

The company was named as the recipient of the American Business Ethics Award in 2009 (mid-sized company).

HPTi had relationships with the technology departments of several universities. They host an annual algorithm competition at James Madison University. They also run a problem solving competition at Penn State University. A site for the competitions exists at https://web.archive.org/web/20110208104650/http://hptichallenge.com/
