= HRL Laboratories =

Research facility in California, USA

HRL Laboratories, LLC
- Formerly: Hughes Research Laboratories
- Type: Subsidiary
- Founded: 1948; 78 years ago, in Culver City, California
- Founder: Howard Hughes
- Headquarters: Malibu, California, United States
- Key people: Rob Vasquez (president and CEO)
- Parent: IBM
- Website: www.hrl.com

HRL Laboratories (formerly Hughes Research Laboratories) is a research center in Malibu, California, established in 1960. Formerly the research arm of Hughes Aircraft, it is currently owned by IBM. It is housed in two large, white multi-story buildings overlooking the Pacific Ocean.

The first functioning laser was operated by Theodore Maiman at the Malibu campus in 1960.

On July 23, 2026, IBM announced a definitive agreement to acquire HRL Laboratories from joint owners Boeing and General Motors for an undisclosed amount.

== History ==
In the 1940s, Howard Hughes created an R&D facility in Culver City, California. In 1959 construction started on the headquarters located on a Malibu hilltop overlooking the Pacific Ocean. The modernist white and glass building was designed by Los Angeles architects Ragnar Qvale and Neil Johnson. It was originally designed for David M. Potter to be Potter Aeronautical Company, and was acquired by Hughes Research Laboratories prior to completion. The headquarters was built by the Del E. Webb Construction Company, who built several facilities for Hughes. The laboratory opened in 1960. In 1970 the Webb Construction Company built the second building. In 1984 the U.S. Federal Courts declared in a court case that the Howard Hughes Medical Institute must divest itself of Hughes Aircraft Company and subsidiaries in order to retain its non-profit status. This led to General Motors purchasing Hughes Aircraft in 1985.

GM sold the Hughes aerospace and defense operations to Raytheon in 1997, and spun off Hughes Research Laboratories (legally renamed and organized on December 17, 1997 as a limited liability company, "HRL Laboratories, LLC"), with GM and Raytheon as co-owners. GM sold the Hughes satellite operations to Boeing in 2000, and the co-owners became Boeing, GM, and Raytheon. In 2007, Raytheon decided to sell its stake, though it still maintains research and contractual relations with HRL. For more details, please see Hughes Aircraft. HRL receives funding from its LLC partners, US government contracts, and other commercial customers.

HRL Laboratories, LLC received its first patent on September 12, 2000.

HRL focuses on advanced developments in microelectronics, information and systems sciences, materials, sensors, and photonics; their workspace spans from basic research to product delivery. It has particularly emphasized capabilities in high performance integrated circuits, high power lasers, antennas, networking, quantum information science, and smart materials.

Despite downsizing during the aerospace industry's contraction of the 1990s, HRL still continued to be the largest employer in Malibu.

On July 23, 2026, IBM entered into a definitive agreement to acquire HRL Laboratories from its joint owners, Boeing and General Motors, for an undisclosed sum. Under the agreement, IBM will integrate HRL's expertise in silicon-spin qubit engineering, quantum sensing, and cryogenics into its quantum computing development, while Boeing and GM will continue partnering with IBM on quantum applications.

== Notable accomplishments ==
- The first working model of the laser was created at Hughes Research Laboratories in 1960 by Theodore Maiman (1927–2007).
- HRL began research on atomic clocks in 1959. In the late 1970s they produced experimental maser oscillators for NRL, which eventually led to space-based GPS atomic clocks.
- HRL began research on ion propulsion in 1960. This research led to the Hughes developed xenon ion propulsion system (XIPS. XIPS was used as the primary propulsion system on NASA's Deep Space 1 (launched in 1998). It is a standard option for primary stationkeeping on the Hughes/Boeing 601HP (first use: PAS-5, 1997) and the 702 (first use: Galaxy-XI, 1999) geostationary satellite families.
- HRL claims to have developed the liquid crystal wristwatch in 1975. J. David Margerum, a Hughes scientist, was instrumental in this work.
- HRL's SyNAPSE neuromorphic chip is the first chip to learn like the brain by altering synapses (listed as one of MIT Tech Review top ten breakthrough technologies) (2010s).
- Developed world's largest most biologically accurate, integrated computational model of 9 brain systems explaining cognitive biases (2010s).
- CNN Top Ten DARPA Technologies (Cognitive Technology Threat Warning System), the world's first "cognitive-neural" binocular threat-detection technology (2010s).
- Developed "MagicNet", a pattern matching method using time-delay neural networks that is two times faster than deterministic finite automata for exact pattern matching (2011).
- Designed and built reconfigurable spatially immersive display system (1990s).
- First hybrid satellite-wireless ad hoc network (1990s).
- First stabilized outdoor augmented reality system (1990s).
- HRL developed the metallic microlattice, the lightest material, in 2011.
- Demonstrated singlet-triplet oscillations in a silicon quantum double dot (2012).

== See also ==
- Cognitive Technology Threat Warning System
