= Engility =

American engineering and logistics company

Engility Holdings, Inc.
- Company type: Subsidiary
- Founded: July 2011; 14 years ago
- Headquarters: Chantilly, Virginia, U.S.
- Area served: United States
- Key people: Lynn Dugle (CEO)
- Revenue: ▼$1.93 billion (2017)
- Net income: ▼-$35.2 million (2017)
- Number of employees: 11,000 (January 2015)
- Parent: Science Applications International Corporation
- Subsidiaries: TASC
- Website: www.engility.com

Engility Holdings, Inc. was an American publicly traded company that provided engineering and logistics services to several United States Armed Forces and civilian agencies. The company based in Chantilly, Virginia was formed in 2012 as a spin-off of the services division of L3 Technologies. As of 2017, Engility reports an annual revenue of about $2 billion. On September 10, 2018, Science Applications International Corporation announced it was buying Engility for about $2.5 billion with the brand being retired.

== History ==
Engility is now part of SAIC. Engility, previously known as L-3 Services, Inc., became an independent publicly traded corporation in July 2012 as part of a spin-off transaction by L-3 Communications Corporation. At the time of the spin-off, the new company was estimated to have an annual revenue of $1.6 to $2 billion and employed about 9,000 to 10,000 people. The L-3 Services Group EVP, Tony Smeraglinolo, was announced as the CEO of the new defense contractor firm. Following the spin-off from its New York-based parent company, Engility established its headquarters in Chantilly, Virginia, in the Washington metropolitan area. The new company acquired much of L-3's services business, while its former parent company retained most of the products business.

In January 2013, the Associated Press reported that Engility had paid a $5.28 million settlement to 71 former inmates of Abu Ghraib prison. The company had inherited lawsuits from L-3 Services Group which in turn had inherited them when L-3 Communications acquired Titan Corporation. The contract with the United States Armed Forces called for Titan to provide translators to support the personnel in the Iraqi prison.

In December 2013, Engility agreed to acquire the Andover, Massachusetts,-based Dynamics Research Corporation. Valued at $120.9 million, the deal was completed in January 2014, beginning a full integration of the two companies.

In October 2014, Engility announced that it planned to acquire another Chantilly, Virginia-based defense contractor, TASC KKR and General Atlantic, the private equity firms which previously owned TASC, gained a 51% stake in Engility Holdings as part of the merger. The all-stock acquisition deal was valued at $1.1 billion. Engility completed the acquisition of its rival in February 2018 with the final price for the deal reported as $1.3 billion. After the merger, the company announced that TASC's chief executive, John Hynes, had joined Engility as the chief operating officer. The TASC brand remained in operation as a subsidiary of Engility.

== Operations ==
Since the spin-off from L-3, Engility has been based in Chantilly, Virginia, located in the Washington metropolitan area. In March 2013, Engility implemented a significant reduction in its auxiliary workforce, cutting about 40 percent of its accounting, human resources, and payroll departments, reducing its total of 7,800 employees by 4%. After the merger with TASC in early 2015, however, the company was estimated to employ about 11,000 people, of which 4,000 are located near the nation 's capital.

As of March 2016, the Engility appointed a former Raytheon employee Lynn Dugle as chief executive. In June 2017, the company eliminated the positions of president and COO previously held by former-TASC CEO John Hynes, who also left the company at the same time. That same month, the company won a contract from the US Air Force to consult on review and evaluation of the space vehicles and missile equipment located at Los Angeles Air Force Base. In November 2017, the US Navy granted Engility a modernization contract valued at $30 million. In March 2018, Engility reported a revenue of $1.93 billion and net loss of $35.2 million in the previous year.
