= Future Force Warrior =

Modernized subsystem for the U.S. Army

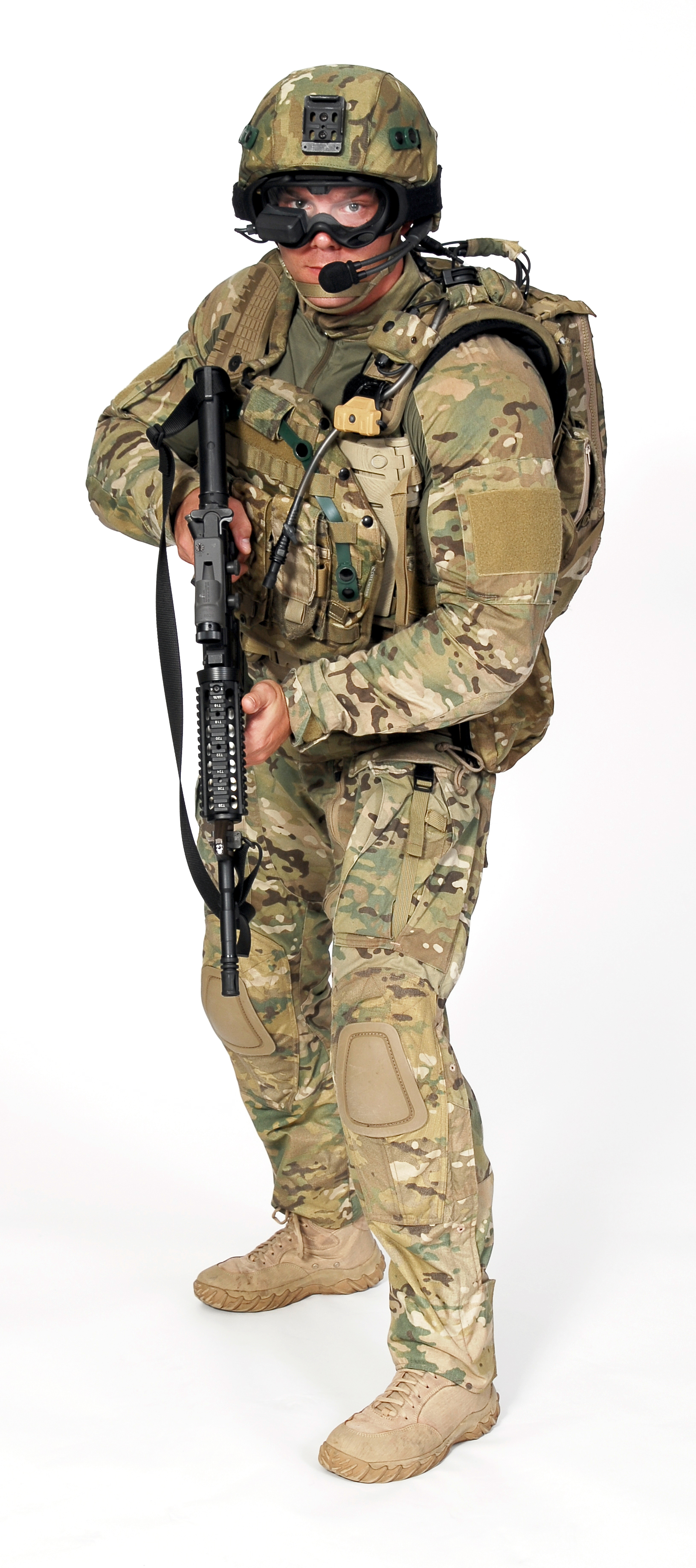
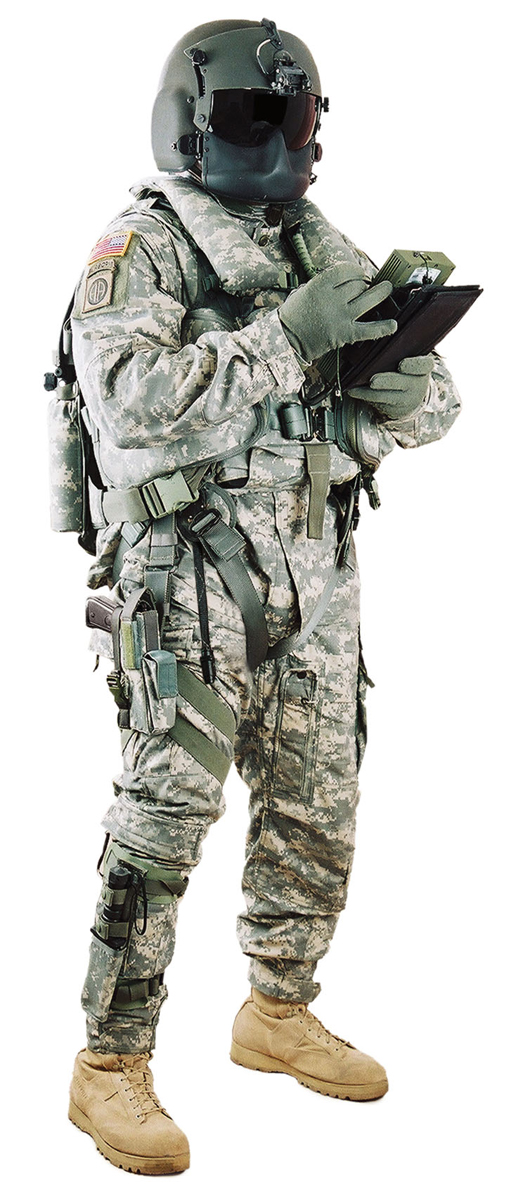
- Land Warrior and Air Warrior
- Type: Soldier
- Place of origin: United States

Future Force Warrior was a United States military advanced technology demonstration project that was part of the Future Combat Systems project. The FFW project sought to create a lightweight, fully integrated infantryman combat system. It was one technology demonstration project in a series of network-centric, next-generation infantry combat projects the U.S. military have developed over the past decade, such as the Soldier Integrated Protective Ensemble program, Land Warrior, and transformation of the United States Army.

The Future Force Warrior concept envisioned the use of technologies such as nanotechnology, powered exoskeletons, and magnetorheological fluid-based body armor to provide the infantry with significantly higher force multiplier than the opposing force. However, the stated concept was not U.S. Army doctrine, and was not intended to answer every situation that Army After Next (the Army's buzzword for future fighting forces) would face; rather, the concept was meant to serve as an end goal to strive to reach or to compromise with current technologies and to stir imagination and dialogue on how these technologies and concepts could help soldiers in the near future.

The first phase of the project involved a development of the technologies to help reduce the soldier's fighting load and power requirements and improving the soldier's protection, lethality, and environmental and situational awareness, with planned deployment in 2010, to serve the Army's short-term needs. The Army's plan was to introduce the subsystems in "spirals" every two years, instead of one large rollout every ten years. The U.S. military hoped to develop a fully realized end product sometime in 2032, incorporating research from U.C. Berkeley's BLEEX exoskeleton project and the Massachusetts Institute of Technology's Institute for Soldier Nanotechnologies into a final design. This was one of the most important parts. The Army Combat Shirt was developed from this program.

== Basic Features ==
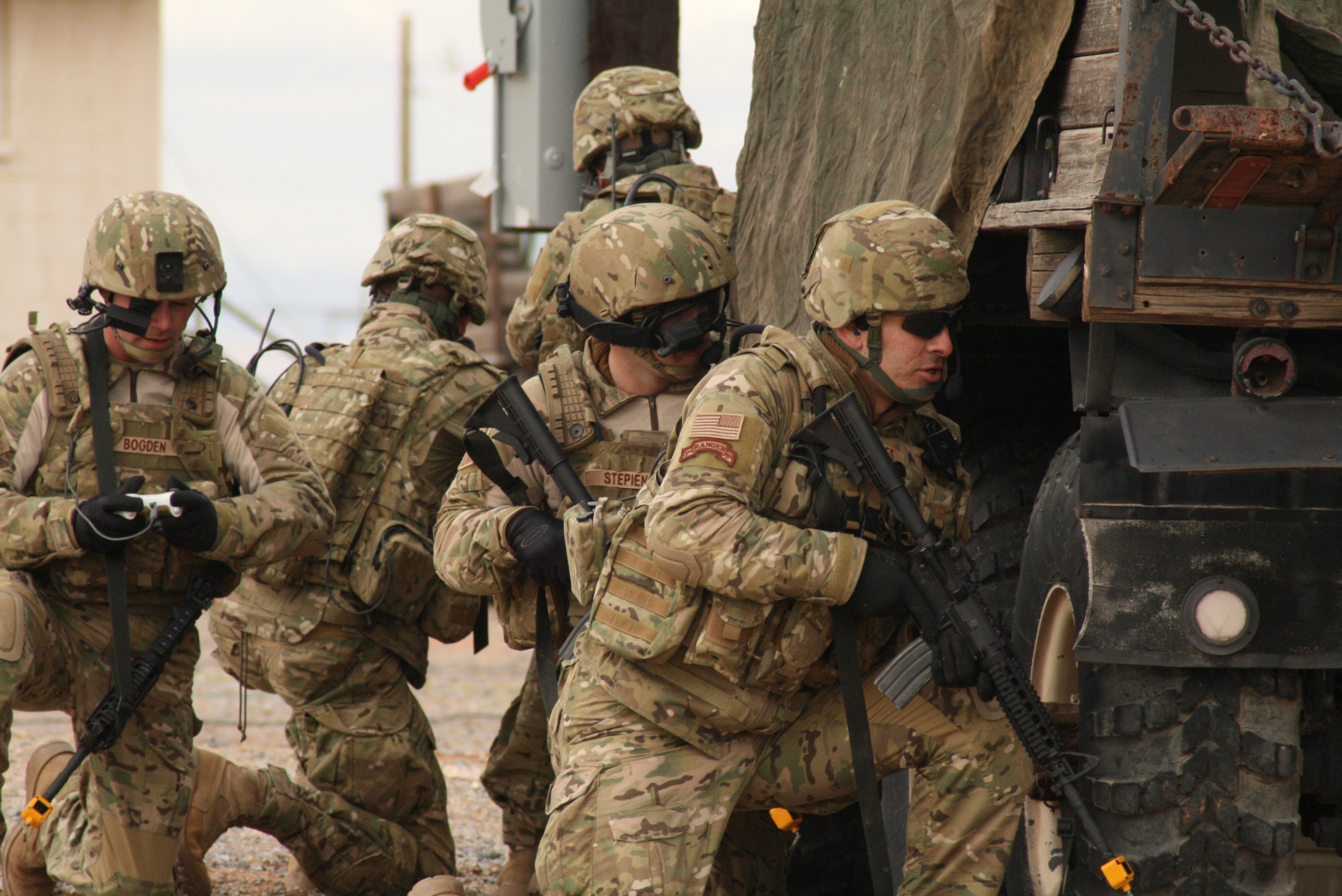
U.S. Army Rangers of 3rd Battalion 75th Ranger Regiment from the Future Combat Systems, Evaluation Brigade Combat Team, at a live demonstration February 1, 2007 at Fort Bliss, Texas

=== Nett Warrior ===
Nett Warrior – named after Col. Robert B. Nett – replaced Land Warrior. Future Force Warrior was a futuristic research project with real deliverables folded into the Nett Warrior program. Situational awareness including the Rifleman Radio on every soldier, helmet-mounted display (similar to a HUD), location and Physiological Status Monitoring were the basic building blocks being implemented in increment 1.

=== Headgear Subsystem ===
The Headgear Subsystem was the situational awareness hub of the system. It was intended to include integrated tactical processing by providing maps, routes, and data with a 180° emissive visor display, high bandwidth wireless communications, microelectronic/optics combat sensor suite that provides 360° situational awareness, and integrated small arms protection.

=== Combat Uniform Subsystem ===
Described as "Survivability Central", was intended to contain a trio of layers, "the Protective Outer Layer, the Power Centric Layer, and the Life Critical Layer."

=== Warfighter Physiological Status Monitor Subsystem ===
WPSM was intended to be an on-board physiological and medical sensor suite that would collect and monitor information regarding vital signs such as body temperature, heart rate, blood pressure, hydration and stress levels, sleep status, body positioning and workload capacity of the warrior. If necessary, the WPSM can notify medics and commanders if the soldier has been wounded or has become fatigued.

=== Microclimate Cooling System ===
The Microclimate Cooling System, built into the Life Critical Layer, would have been a network of narrow tubing to provide heating or cooling to the soldier, up to 100 watts.

=== Power Subsystem ===
The Power Subsystem, built into the Power Centric Layer, would be fed by the Duration Central, a 2 to 20 watt Micro Turbine fueled by a liquid hydrocarbon fuel pack. According to the concept, ten ounces of fuel would power the soldier's integrated electronics ensemble for up to 6 days. Polymeric nanofiber battery patches embedded in the headgear and weapon provide back-up power for three hours.

Listed under the Power Vision in the Advanced Technology Demonstrator, the current specifications ask for 24-hour autonomous individual operation and 72-hour continuous autonomous team operations, with a high density, low weight/volume, self-generating/re-generating, reliable, safe power source.

== Air Warrior ==
Air Warrior was the U.S. Army's next-generation aircrew ensemble, with the final product intended to provide life support, ballistic protection, and nuclear, biological, and chemical (NBC) protection in mission-configurable modules, and was under development with interoperability in mind. The system consists of components integrated to maximize safe aircraft operation and sustain aircrews throughout the flight environment.

=== Block 1 ===
Block 1 of the Air Warrior system provided an initial system capability including the development, procurement, and fielding of a micro climate cooling system, an integrated survival gear and ballistic protection system, improved over-water protective equipment, and a light-weight chemical and biological protection ensemble.

=== Block 2 ===
The ongoing Block 2 technology insertion program provided an Electronic Data Manager and an Aircrew Wireless Intercom System.

=== Block 3 ===
General Dynamics C4 Systems was the Block 3 Systems Integrator. The Block 3 system was focused on increasing force effectiveness by improving situational awareness and survivability with features similar to those of the Headgear Subsystem.

The Air Warrior Block 3 system was intended to be compatible with multiple helicopter types, including the CH-47 Chinook, OH-58D Kiowa Warrior, AH-64 Apache and UH-60 Blackhawk. Additional Block 3 capabilities were being defined through the requirements analysis and roadmap phase.

== Land Warrior ==
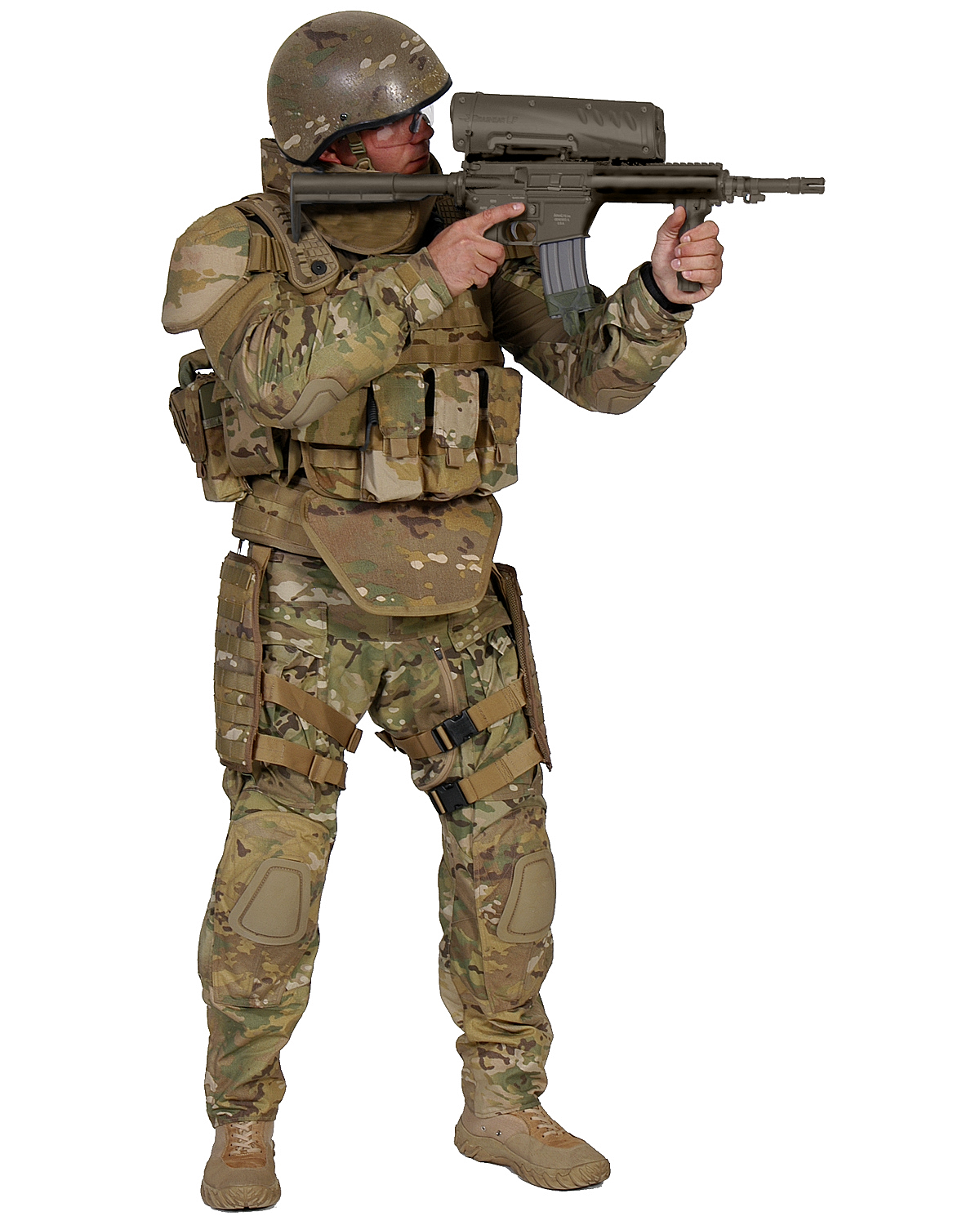
Future Force Warrior ensemble, c. 2005

In February 2005, the U.S. Army merged the Future Force Warrior and Land Warrior programs to make integration of new technologies easier. The subsequent program was managed by US Army Natick Soldier Center, and was projected to become the Ground Soldier System (GSS).

== See also ==
- Soldier Integrated Protective Ensemble
- Future Soldier 2030 Initiative
- MultiCam, the camouflage pattern and clothing used in many FFW examples.
- Micropower
- Cognitive Technology Threat Warning System, a DARPA project aimed at integrating AI research, and sensory data to create a portable warning-alert system.
