= TASC, Inc. =

American private defense contractor

- Type: Subsidiary
- Industry: Defense contracting
- Founded: 1966 (incorporated as The Analytic Sciences Corporation)
- Founder: Arthur Gelb; Harry B. Silverman
- Headquarters: Chantilly, Virginia, U.S.
- Number of locations: 20 offices nationwide (as of October 2011)
- Key people: John Hynes (President and CEO)
- Services: Systems engineering Systems integration Decision support
- Number of employees: nearly 5,000
- Parent: Engility
- Website: tasc.com

TASC, Inc., formerly known as The Analytic Sciences Corporation, is an American private defense contractor based outside Washington, D.C., in Chantilly, Virginia. Northrop Grumman owned TASC from 2001 to 2009, when it sold the unit to comply with new government conflict of interest rules.

In February 2015, Engility Holdings announced that it had completed its acquisition of TASC. in an all-stock transaction valued at approximately $1.3 billion, including the assumption of net debt.

== History ==
=== Background ===
In 1966, Arthur Gelb and Harry B. Silverman formed The Analytic Sciences Corporation (TASC) in Winchester, Massachusetts. The firm provided the U.S. government with modeling, simulation, analysis, and evaluation of integrated navigation and guidance systems for programs including the Trident submarine, Minuteman Missile, and the Space Shuttle.

During the 1970s, TASC's efforts grew in information management and decision support systems, analytical approaches for disposing of nuclear waste, and software engineering for embedded software systems. It commenced technical support, focusing on issues of reliability, life-cycle cost, and data tracking. It also established an economics and management sciences division in Rosslyn, Virginia, for analyzing and supporting government procurement activities. In 1978, TASC purchased a Reston, Virginia–based engineering group specializing in reconnaissance, communication, and intelligence. It built research facilities and laboratories for image-processing, artificial intelligence, and microelectronics.

During the 1980s, TASC bought WSI Corporation, based in Billerica, Massachusetts, which provided real-time weather information to the public and private sector (including broadcast, aviation, and agriculture). It also bought ESD Corporation, to complement WSI.

During the 1990s, Primark Corporation bought TASC. Primark (now owned by Thomson Financial) provided financial, economic, and market research information. TASC developed system architectures for Primark subsidiaries and special product design and research services. In 1998, Litton Industries bought TASC from Primark.

In 2000, TASC sold three stand-alone commercial operations: Adesso Software, WSI Corporation, and Emerge. TASC then refocused on government markets and related industrial applications of its technology. In 2001, Northrop Grumman bought Litton Industries and made TASC part of its Information Technology division. In 2002, Northrop Grumman bought TRW. In 2008, TASC (as a subsidiary) bought 3001 International, specializing in geospatial data production and analysis. In 2009, Northrop Grumman merged its Information Technology and Mission Systems divisions. All systems engineering, technical assistance, and advisory services fell under TASC, with development project moving into other units.

=== Formation ===
The 2009 Weapon Systems Acquisition Reform Act (WSARA) forbids conflicts created by use of federal contractors as both advisors of support services and developers of major defense acquisition programs. This put Northrop Grumman in legal conflict, since it provided both development and advisory services to the federal government.

As a result, in November 2009, Northrop Grumman sold TASC, its advisory services group, to investors led by General Atlantic and KKR for $1.65 billion.

=== Recent history ===
TASC helped assure launch of the Minotaur IV from Kodiak, Alaska, for U.S. Navy experimentation in September 2011. The rocket placed a U.S. Navy TacSat-4 (Tactical Satellite 4) spacecraft into a highly elliptical orbit at 7,500 miles above Earth.

Engility Corporation acquired TASC in 2015.

== Acquisitions and contracts ==
In June 2011, TASC bought TexelTek, specializing in secure cloud solutions for the U.S. government. In 2013, TexelTek lost its main contract and is currently defunct; most employees were not retained by TASC.

=== National Defense Authorization Act ===
In July 2011, TASC responded to passage of the 2011 National Defense Authorization Act. The NDAA gives defense agencies unlimited rights to technical data arising from federally funded independent research and development. Company chief technology officer, Richard Rosenthal, commented, saying:

It is not clear how it will affect the intellectual property rights. But if the alternative is that government will receive unlimited rights, contractors might opt to just pay for the research and development from their own profits. That could change the playing field—favoring the large companies that can afford to make those investments.

“Small businesses tend to have just one or two key products that they sell to government as their discriminator. And a lot of initial profits go into keeping talent at the company, rather than investing in the next big development. For all of industry, this requirement will force some business decisions to be made. But for these smaller companies, there’s a lot more to consider.

=== Recent contracts ===
In October 2010, TASC won a contract from the FAA, capped at $827.8 million, to support the agency's transition to its Next Generation Air Transportation System.

In March 2011, TASC won a $97 million contract for the Defense Threat Reduction Agency to provide advice and assistance to the agency's Combat Support and Nuclear Support directorates. Services will cover areas of nuclear deterrence.

In April 2011, TASC won a single-award, five-year IDIQ contract, capped at $600 million, to support the Defense Threat Reduction Agency's Research and Development Enterprise.

In February 2012, the U.S. Air Force awarded TASC a contract to support the Air Force Medical Service (AFMS) within the continental United States and U.S. territories.

In May 2012, the U.S. Department of Homeland Security awarded TASC a $54 million contract to provide its Domestic Nuclear Detection Office (DNDO) with advanced systems engineering and integration and other decision-support services.

In September 2012, the Defense Information Systems Agency awarded TASC a five-year indefinite-delivery/indefinite-quantity Test & Evaluation Mission Support Service contract.
