= Cognitive Technology Threat Warning System =

The Cognitive Technology Threat Warning System, otherwise known as (CT2WS), is a brain–computer interface designed to analyze sensory data and then alert foot-soldiers to any possible threats, passive or direct. CT2WS is part of U.S. Department of Defense's effort to produce an efficient and working Network-centric infantryman.

== Project ==
=== Proposal ===
Proposed in early 2007, DARPA came to believe that a visual warning system could be produced and developed via an integration of technology and artificial intelligence. By combining discoveries in flat-field, wide-angle optics, large pixel-count digital imagers, ultra-low power analog-digital hybrid signal processing electronics with cognitive visual processing algorithms, and neural network-based target detection signatures, DARPA felt a breakthrough was possible, but not likely to be achieved by independent researchers. CT2WS further requires that human brain activity must be integrated with the technology.

Selection of research partners is currently open to potential researchers, including: non-traditional defense contractors, nonprofit organizations, educational institutions, small businesses, etc.

It was anticipated that funding for CT2WS will continue until 2011.

=== Funding ===
Budget for the project will be determined based upon the scope of the independent proposals. There have been many research and technology contributors to the project including HRL and Advanced Brain Monitoring which contributed the B-Alert wireless-EEG headsets.

=== Technical details ===
Criteria for project includes: soldier portable, sensory-data collect for a 120 degree field of view (FOV), artificial analysis of data, threat analysis and prioritizing "brain-in-the-loop" integration, and real-time processing of neural and artificial cognitive data.

== Related projects ==
The DARPA Grand Challenge is another project designed to attract independent researchers to study AI for application to network-centric warfare. The Grand Challenge has tested autonomous driving ability in both urban and rough terrain settings.

== See also ==
- Future Combat Systems
- Future Force Warrior
- Transformation of the United States Army
