= Coolmax =

Polyester fabric brand name

Coolmax is the brand name for a series of polyester fabrics developed and marketed by The Lycra Company (formerly Dupont Textiles and Interiors then Invista).

Coolmax is marketed as "moisture-wicking" and "breathable". As a polyester, it is moderately hydrophobic, so it absorbs little fluid and dries relatively quickly (compared to absorbent fibers such as cotton). The cross-section is non-round, increasing surface area by an estimated 20% (over round fibers) in order to produce a wicking effect via capillary action.

The Lycra Company makes extensive use of co-branding in their marketing of Coolmax and other clothing materials, partnering with their customers to increase awareness of their product among end consumers.

Like other polyester fabrics, Coolmax is flammable and has a relatively low melting point (~255 °C), giving clothes made from it a tendency to melt and fuse to the wearer's skin when exposed to high heat. This has led to Coolmax and other polyesters (along with acrylic and rayon) being restricted or banned in certain high-fire-risk applications, such as firefighting and front-line combat.
