= Invista =

American integrated fiber, resin and intermediates company

INVISTA
- Type: Subsidiary
- Industry: Spandex, resin, chemical, polymer
- Founded: February 2003; 23 years ago (as DuPont Textiles and Interiors); April 30, 2004 (as INVISTA)
- Headquarters: Wichita, Kansas, United States
- Number of employees: 10,000
- Parent: Koch Industries
- Website: www.invista.com

Invista (stylized as INVISTA) is a fiber, resin, and intermediates company headquartered in Wichita, Kansas, United States. It has about 10,000 employees in over 20 countries worldwide. The predecessor DuPont Textiles and Interiors was formed from DuPont's textile fibers division in February 2003. The company was given the trademarked name INVISTA and was then sold to privately owned Koch Industries on April 30, 2004 for US$4.2 billion. Koch Industries combined the newly acquired organization with their KoSa subsidiary to complete the INVISTA company.

== Operations ==
INVISTA's products include many brands.

In 2008, Invista sued Rhodia, a chemical company, for theft and misappropriation of a chemical process technology used to produce nylon 6,6.

In February 2009, INVISTA announced a refinancing and capitalization plan that had reduced its debt by $1.6 billion since the previous June. In the same year, Invista was the launch sponsor for WWDChina Week in Review, a weekly fashion publication.

Also in 2009, INVISTA agreed to pay a $1.7 million civil penalty and spend up to $500 million to correct self-reported environmental violations at its facilities in seven states. Prior to the settlement, the company had disclosed to the United States Environmental Protection Agency (EPA) more than 680 violations after auditing 12 facilities acquired from DuPont in 2004. In June 2012, DuPont & INVISTA agreed to an out of court settlement to resolve indemnification issues related to these environmental issues.

In 2019, Invista sold its Apparels & Advanced Textiles business to Shandong Ruyi. The sale included brands Lycra, Coolmax, and Thermolite. It was said to have cost more than $2 billion. Koch Industries still retains a minority stake in The Lycra Company.
