= Dynamics Research Corporation =

- Industry: Defense
- Founded: 1955
- Defunct: 2014
- Fate: Purchased by Engility Corporation
- Successor: Engility Corporation
- Headquarters: Andover, Massachusetts

Dynamics Research Corporation (DRC) was a publicly traded American company founded in 1955. The company was primarily an engineering services company serving the U.S. Department of Defense. DRC provided technical and consulting expertise around high-performance computing, cybersecurity, financial and regulatory reform, as well as program, engineering and life-cycle support, and IT modernization and sustainment.

DRC's customers included the U.S. Air Force, U.S. Navy, U.S. Department of Health and Human Services, U.S. Department of Veterans Affairs, the Department of Homeland Security, the U.S. intelligence community, and the U.S. Department of the Treasury. More than 50 percent of DRC’s 2013 sales (estimated at $274M USD) were from non-Defense Department customers. About 80 percent of DRC’s work was as a prime contractor.

In 2014, the company was purchased by Engility Corporation.

== See also ==
- Francis J. Aguilar
