= Leo Meyer =

Leo Meyer may refer to:

- Leo J. Meyer (1917–2006), U.S. Army officer and Combat Infantryman Badge recipient
- Leo R. "Dutch" Meyer (1898–1982), college football coach at Texas Christian University
- Leo Meyer (baseball) (1888–1968), shortstop for the Brooklyn Dodgers in 1909
- Leo Meyer (philologist) (1830–1910), German philologist
- Leo Meyer (politician) (1873–1964), Oklahoma's first Jew elected to statewide public office (State Auditor)
- Leo Meyer (producer) (1891–1942), film producer
