= Officer Candidate School (United States Army) =

US Army Officer commissioning program

US Army Officer Candidate School
- The original Officer Candidate School logo, "the OCS road wheel"
- Active: 1941 – 19/20 December 1949; 1951 – present
- Country: United States
- Branch: United States Army
- Type: Training
- Role: Train and commission U.S. Army Officers
- Part of: United States Army Combined Arms Command
- Garrison/HQ: Fort Benning, Georgia
- Mottos: "Standards, No Compromise"
- March: OCS Alma Mater
- Website: https://www.benning.army.mil/infantry/199th/ocs/Index.html

Commanders
- Current commander: Lieutenant Colonel Jonathan D. Kingsley

The United States Army's Officer Candidate School (OCS) is an officer training program that trains, assesses, and evaluates potential commissioned officers of the U.S. Army, U.S. Army Reserve, and Army National Guard. Officer Candidates are former enlisted members (E-4 to E-8), Warrant Officers, inter-service transfers, or civilian college graduates who have enlisted as an "09S" to attend OCS after they have completed Basic Combat Training (BCT). Graduates have been historically called "90-day wonders".

While the U.S. Army Officer Candidate School is located at Fort Benning, Georgia there are other OCS programs for members of the Army Reserve and National Guard. One of such is conducted at Fort McClellan Army National Guard Training Site in Anniston, AL by the Alabama Military Academy.

OCS is generally a 12-week course designed to train, assess, evaluate, and develop Second Lieutenants for the U.S. Army. It is the only commissioning source that can be responsive to the U.S. Army's changing personnel requirements due to its short length, compared to other commissioning programs and their requirements. Completing OCS is one of several ways of becoming a U.S. Army commissioned officer. The other methods are:

- Graduation from the United States Military Academy (USMA) or any of the other U.S. federal service academies.
- Completing Reserve Officers' Training Corps (ROTC) offered at many civilian universities throughout the United States
- Completing Officer Candidate School programs of the Army National Guard at Regional Training Institutes (RTI).
- Direct Commissioning: This is normally reserved for accessions of chaplains, medical professionals, and Judge Advocate General (JAG) lawyers.
- Inter-service transfer as a Commissioned Officer of another United States military branch.
- Battlefield commissions, or meritorious commissions, though technically still provided for, have not been used by the U.S. Army since the Vietnam War.

The U.S. Army Officer Candidate School is organizationally designated as 3rd Battalion, 11th Infantry Regiment, 199th Infantry Brigade. It was redesignated from the 3rd Battalion, 11th Infantry Regiment in June 2007. It is a subordinate unit of the Maneuver Center of Excellence (MCoE) also headquartered at Fort Benning. As of July 2014, the battalion has five training companies and a Headquarters Company in operation, designated as HHC, Alpha, Bravo, Charlie, Delta, and Echo; each of which can conduct one class at a time, with a maximum of 160 candidates being trained in each class. Alpha through Delta are used for OCS. Echo Company is reserved for the six-week Direct Commission Course, which is the initial entry training for direct commission officers such as Judge Advocates. HHC serves as the "holding" company for brand new candidates going through their in-processing or for injured candidates who are recuperating from their injuries. Those who recuperate from injury are often "recycled" into the next class. Every three weeks, a class graduates and another one is started.

The commander of the 3rd Battalion, 11th Infantry Regiment (OCS), 199th Infantry Brigade is Lieutenant Colonel Jonathan D. Kingsley, and the Command Sergeant Major is Command Sergeant Major Axel Nieves-Lopez.

== History ==
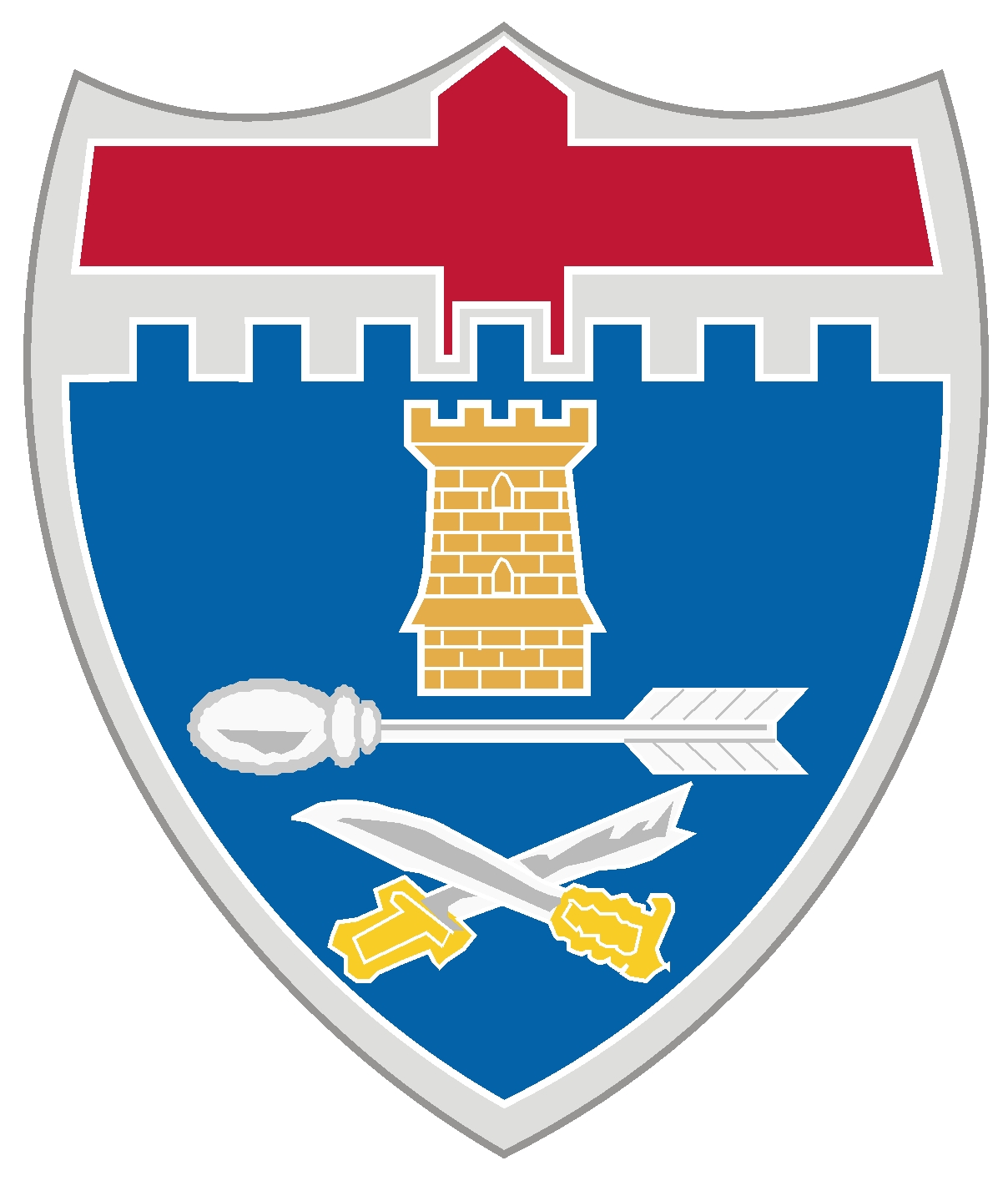
The 11th Infantry Regiment's distinctive unit insignia currently worn by the cadre and students of the U.S. Army Officer Candidate School

Historically, OCS has provided the means by which the U.S. Army could generate large numbers of junior officers during periods of increasing personnel requirements, typically during wars. Prior to 1973, OCS was branch-specific, at one time there being eight separate schools; by 1968, the Army had consolidated OCS. Candidates being commissioned in the combat support branches were sent to Fort Belvoir, Virginia, and would be trained as Combat Engineer Officers. Upon graduation, graduates other than Engineers would be commissioned in their assigned branch and sent to an officer's basic course. Candidates being commissioned in the combat arms branches would be sent to Infantry OCS at Fort Benning, Georgia or possibly Artillery OCS at Fort Sill, Oklahoma. At that time, OCS consisted of twenty-three weeks of classroom and field training. The Vietnam war brought a significant expansion of the program. In 1973, OCS was made branch immaterial and was consolidated into two courses taught at Fort Benning, and another at Fort McClellan, Alabama for female officer candidates; the course length was reduced to 14-weeks. In 1976, the OCS at Fort Benning integrated female candidates and became the only OCS left in the active Army, with the closure of the WAC School. The term "90-day wonders", both as a pejorative and term of affection, has been intermittently applied to junior officers commissioned through OCS since World War II.

=== World War II era ===
Officer Candidate School was first proposed in June 1938, as the Army began expanding in anticipation of hostilities when a plan for an officer-training program was submitted to the Chief of Infantry by Brigadier General Asa L. Singleton, Commandant of the Infantry School. No action was taken until July 1940, however, when Brigadier General Courtney Hodges, Assistant Commandant of the Infantry School, presented a revised plan to (then) Brigadier General Omar Bradley, Commandant of the Infantry School. In July 1941, the OCS stood up as the Infantry, Field Artillery, and Coastal Artillery Officer Candidate Schools, each respectively located at Fort Benning, Fort Sill, and Fort Monroe, Virginia.

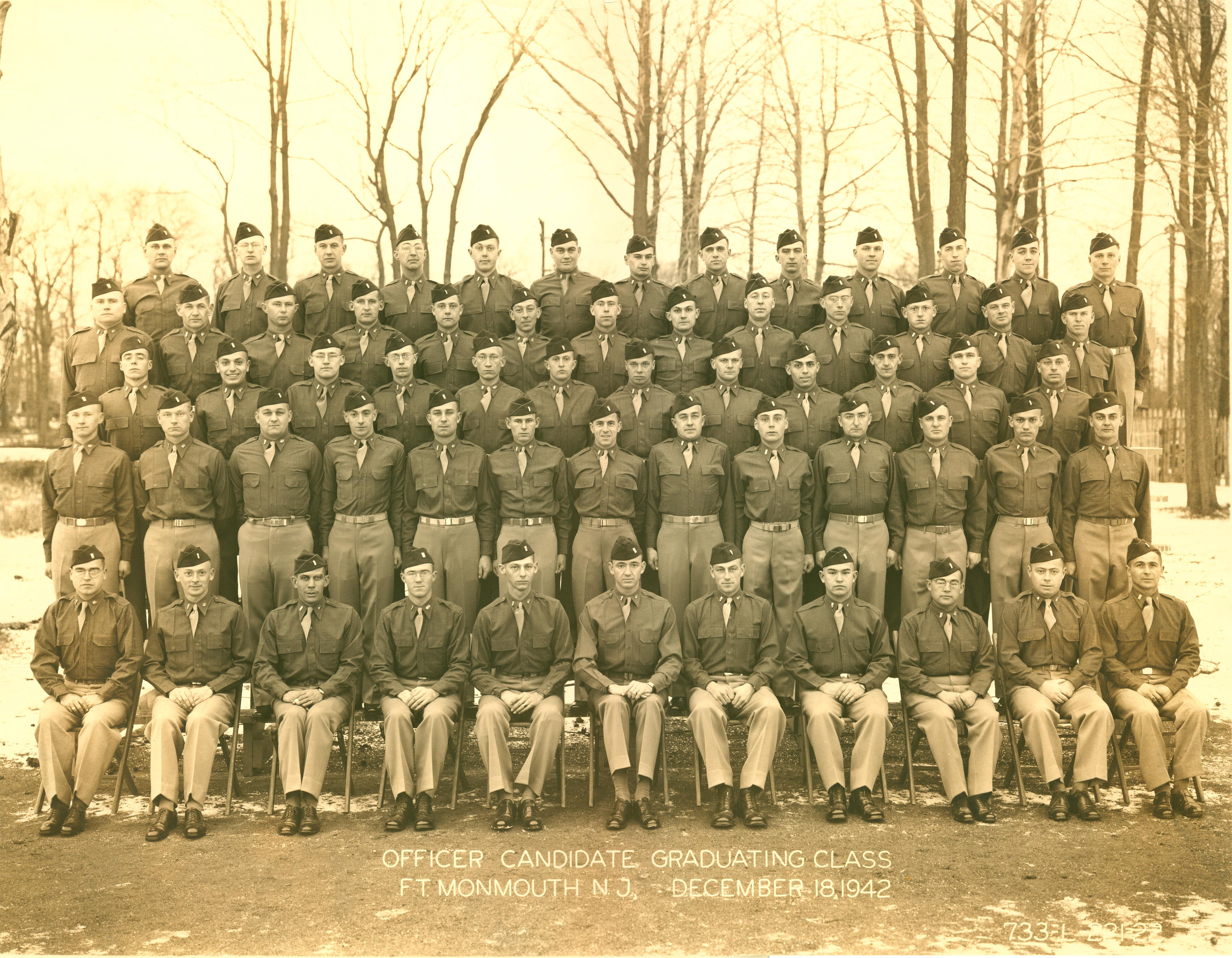
Signal Corps Graduating Class, December 1942, Fort Monmouth.

In addition to the aforementioned programs, there were Officer Candidate Schools stood up for other branches, in particular, the Signal Corps at Fort Monmouth, New Jersey. Due to the rapid creation of these programs because of wartime necessity, and then the rapid closures or restructuring soon after the end of the war, historical records were not always created or adequately maintained and little is known about some of these branch specific commissioning courses. The Signal Corps however has a full list of records going back to its very first class, which graduated 336 Officers on 30 September 1941. The records are maintained by the U.S. Army Signal Corps OCS Association, which is actively collecting and archiving the personal history of many of the over 27,000 Signal Corps OCS graduates that went through its WWII, Korean War, and Vietnam War programs. The Signal Corps website includes a list of every U.S. Army Signal Corps OCS graduate, the date of their graduation, as well as all TAC Officers, training school CO's, and most enlisted men who served the Signal Corps' OCS training programs. In addition to the Signal Corps, several other units have alumni organizations that have maintained informal records and preserved documentation of the courses.

On 27 September 1941, the first Infantry OCS class graduated 171 second lieutenants; 204 men started the 17-week course in July. Testament to the ability of OCS to produce new second lieutenants quickly can be found in War Department decision that ROTC could not fulfill the national demand for officers; so in May 1943, the advanced course in ROTC was suspended and basic course graduates were immediately sent to OCS so they could be commissioned sooner.

During the war, the Army's policy of racial segregation continued among enlisted members; Army training policy, however, provided that blacks and whites would train together in officer candidate schools (beginning in 1942). Officer Candidate School was the Army's first formal experiment with integration. Black and white candidates shared officer's quarters, with bunkmates assigned alphabetically, regardless of their race, and all of the candidates trained together. Despite this integrated training, in most instances, the graduates would go on to join racially segregated units.

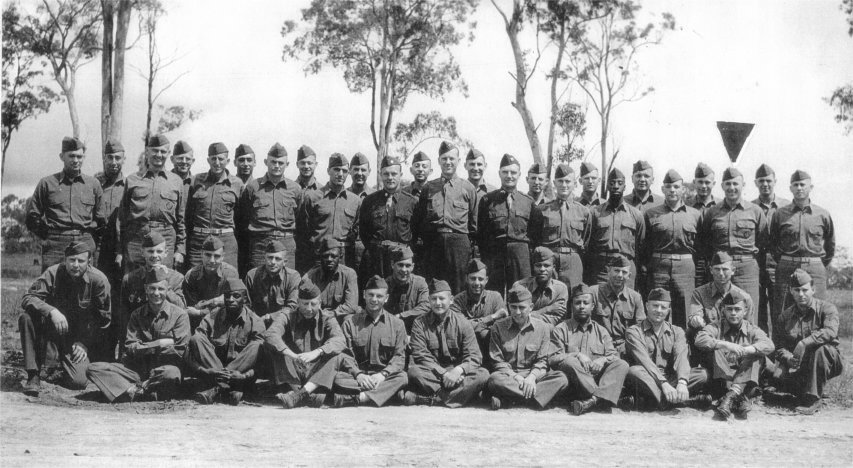
Graduating class of September 1944, SWPA OCS at Camp Columbia, Australia, showing an integrated population.

General Bradley is credited with establishing the format, discipline, and code of honor still used in OCS today. Bradley emphasized rigorous training, strict discipline and efficient organization. These tenets remain the base values of today's Officer Candidate School. Between July 1941 and May 1947, over 100,000 candidates were enrolled in 448 Infantry OCS classes, of these approximately 67 percent completed the course to earn commissions. After World War II, Infantry OCS was transferred to Fort Riley, Kansas, as part of the Ground General School. Due to the post-war downsizing of the Army and the declining need for new Officers, all but Infantry OCS was closed. Finally, on 1 November 1947, it was deactivated. The final class graduated only 52 second lieutenants.

The Women's Army Auxiliary Corps (WAAC) was created by an act of Congress on 14 May 1942, permitting them to serve, but not as Soldiers. At that time, women did not have military status and were not integrated into the Army. Their ranks, pay, and benefits were different from the Army, along with all administration. But, being a military organization that was modeled after, and parallel, to the Army, it required a way to train Officers; therefore it created its own WAAC OCS, which stood up on 20 July 1942 at Fort Des Moines, Iowa. The course was six-weeks long, its first-class consisting of 440 candidates. Upon graduation, the women were commissioned as third officers (equivalent to a second lieutenant). It is worth noting, that among the first candidates were 40 black women. Initially, black women were segregated, but in keeping with Army policies, integrating officer training, and with pressure from the National Association for the Advancement of Colored People (NAACP), by November 1942, they were being trained in integrated units.

=== Cold War ===
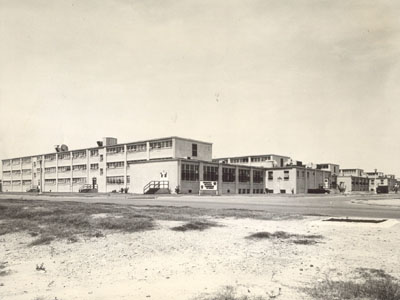
1st Officer Candidate Battalion, 2nd Student Regiment

With the outbreak of the Korean War, and the Army's rapid expansion in response, the shortage of on-hand officers, and projected commissions, caused the Department of the Army to re-open Infantry OCS at Fort Benning on 18 February 1951. The course was lengthened from 17 to 22 weeks, as a result of lessons learned from WWII; thus permitting more instruction in Infantry tactics. The Infantry Officer Candidate School became the 1st Officer Candidate Battalion, 2nd Student Regiment. The strength of OCS rapidly increased. As one of eight branch programs, Infantry OCS included as many as 29 companies with a class graduating every week. During the Korean War, OCS commissioned approximately 7,000 Infantry officers.

In April 1949, the U.S. Army established the Women's Army Corps Officer Candidate School at Fort Lee, Virginia. The WAC, an active component of the regular Army, a descendant of the WAAC, operated this OCS for female candidates seeking to enter the WAC Officer Corps. The "wash-out" rate was nearly identical to the men's programs, at roughly 37%, during its first four years; an alarming statistic to observers of both programs. By 1954 WAC OCS had been closed and merged with a commissioning program for female direct commissions, due to the low numbers of women attending the WAC OCS course, due in part to tightened standards for selection – in response to investigations of the washout rates.

On 4 August 1953, the Department of the Army reduced OCS from eight to three programs: Infantry, Artillery, and Engineer, finally closing Engineer OCS in July 1954, leaving only the Infantry and Field Artillery schools open. With the onset of the Vietnam War, however, the OCS program was again expanded with officer candidates undergoing a grueling 23-week program of instruction with an extremely high attrition rate which was designed to prepare young officers to be platoon leaders in a demanding Vietnam jungle environment. In September 1965, Engineer OCS reopened at Fort Belvoir, Virginia, and before closing for good in 1971, over 10,000 Engineer Officers had been commissioned.

As the war in Korea edged into 1953, several classes of Infantry School OCS students were given the authorization to transfer to the Medical Service Corps upon graduation. These selected officers (with previous medical experience) were assigned to Korea (after a short training course at Brooke Army Medical Center in San Antonio, Texas), with the explicit duty of trying to keep the direct inductee Medical Officers alive. This was necessary because of the shortage of medical officers and the lack of combat preparation training provided to them after their direct induction into the Army and their immediate assignment to Korea.

At the height of the Vietnam War, Infantry OCS produced 7,000 officers annually from five student battalions, all located at Fort Benning. Also, during the war, a female OCS was once again established; it was stood up at Fort McClellan, Alabama, as part of the WAC Center and School. Other OCS programs were located at Fort Gordon, Georgia (Signal Corps); Fort Sill, Oklahoma (Artillery), Fort Lee, Virginia (Quarter Master), Fort Eustis, Virginia (Transportation), Fort Knox, Kentucky (Armor), Fort Belvoir, Virginia (Engineer) and Aberdeen Proving Ground, Maryland (Ordnance). In April 1973, a branch immaterial OCS was established at Fort Benning, ending the Infantry and Field Artillery based courses. In 1976, with the end of the gender-separate Army, the women's OCS was merged with the branch immaterial male course, creating a program very similar to the modern OCS. The United States Military Academy at West Point, New York, also admitted its first female cadets in 1976. However, due to the length of instruction there (4 years), the newly gender-integrated Officer Candidate School had the distinction of commissioning a female second lieutenant before USMA.

=== List of Historical OCS Programs ===
- Adjutant General (Fort Washington, Maryland).
- Anti-Aircraft Artillery (Camp Davis, North Carolina) [July 1941 – January 1944] The first AAA OCS class started at Fort Monroe in July 1941 and finished at Camp Davis in October 1941.
- Anti-Aircraft Artillery (Fort Bliss, Texas) [October 1951 – July 1953].
- Armor (Fort Knox, Kentucky) [1941 – 1944; September 1951 – May 1953].
- Armor (Fort Knox, Kentucky) [July 1966 – February 1968] From July 1966 to February 1968 the program was a dedicated Armor OCS. Previously it had been a Branch Immaterial OCS course ·
- Army Administration (Fargo, North Dakota, Grinnell Iowa, Gainesville, Florida) Consolidated into a single school at Fort Washington in May 1943.
- Army Officer Candidate (AOC) Course (Fort Riley, Kansas) [1947–1953].
- Army Officer Candidate School (AOCS) [1946–1947] Fort Benning, Georgia.
- Army Air Forces Administration (Miami Beach, Florida) [February 1942 – June 1944] Moved to San Antonio, Texas in June 1944, Moved to Maxwell Field, Alabama in June 1945. Moved to (San Antonio, Texas) [February 1946 – July 1947].
- Army Air Forces Administration (Harvard University) [World War II]
- Branch Immaterial (Fort Knox, Kentucky) [December 1965 – September 1966] Fort Knox was Branch Immaterial for Armor, Quartermaster, Transportation, and Ordnance Corps. Classes completed Phase I (13-weeks) at Fort Knox and Phase II (10-weeks) at either Fort Lee (Quartermaster), Fort Eustis (Transportation), Aberdeen Proving Ground (Ordnance Corps) or Fort Knox (Armor). Class 9–66 (the first class) candidates who completed Phase I were able to choose between Armor, Quartermaster, Transportation, or Ordnance Corps for Phase II.Classes 12–66, 19–66, 23–66 and 27–66 were sent to Aberdeen Proving Ground for Phase II of Ordnance OCS. Classes 15–66, 17–66, 20–66 and 24–66 were sent to Fort Eustis for Phase II of Transportation OCS. Classes 16–66, 21–66 and 26–66 were sent to Fort Lee for Quartermaster OCS. Classes 14–66, 18–66, 22–66 and 25–66 completed both Phase I and II at Fort Knox and were commissioned Armor.
- Branch Immaterial (Fort Benning, Georgia) [April 1973 – present] Creates general-purpose commissioned officers in the place of the previous specialized programs.
- Cavalry (Fort Riley, Kansas) [1941–1944].
- Chemical Warfare Service (Edgewood Arsenal) [World War II]
- Engineers (Fort Belvoir, Virginia) [July 1941 – December 1946; September 1951 – July 1954; September 1965 – January 1971].
- Field Artillery (Fort Sill, Oklahoma) [July 1941 – December 1946; February 1951 – July 1973].
- Finance (Duke University) [World War II].
- Infantry (Fort Benning, Georgia) [1941 – 1947; 1951 – 1973].
- Infantry (Fort Riley, Kansas) [1947].
- Judge Advocate General (Ann Arbor, Michigan) [World War II]
- Medical Administration Corps (Carlisle Barracks, Pennsylvania [July 1941 – October 1945].
- Medical Administration Corps (Camp Barkeley, Texas [May 1942 – March 1945].
- Military Police (Fort Custer, Michigan) [World War II].
- Ordnance Corps (Aberdeen Proving Ground) [1941 – 1945; 1951 – 1952].
- Ordnance Branch (Aberdeen Proving Ground) [1966–1968].
- Quartermaster Corps (Schuylkill Arsenal, Pennsylvania [1941].
- Quartermaster Corps (Fort Washington, Wyoming) [1942].
- Quartermaster Corps (Camp Lee, Virginia) [1941–1945].
- Quartermaster Corps (Fort Lee, Virginia) [July 1966 – August 1967].
- Seacoast Artillery (Fort Monroe, Virginia) [April 1942 – March 1944] Coast Artillery split into the Seacoast Artillery OCS at Fort Monroe and the Anti-Aircraft Artillery OCS at Camp Davis in March 1942. All graduates were commissioned in the Coast Artillery Branch.
- Signal (Fort Monmouth, New Jersey [1941–1946; 1951–1953].
- Signal Corps (Fort Gordon, Georgia) [November 1965 – February 1968].
- Tank Destroyer (Camp Hood, Texas) [1942–1944, then merged with Armor OCS].
- Transportation (Mississippi State College and New Orleans, Louisiana).[World War II].
- Transportation Corps (Fort Eustis, Virginia) [ November 1965 – February 1968].
- Women's Army Corps (Fort Des Moines, Iowa) [July 1942 – September 1943]; [March 1945 – November 1945].
- Women's Army Corps (Camp Oglethorpe, Georgia) [September 1943 – February 1945]
- Women's Army Corps (Fort Lee, Virginia) [1949 – 1952].
- Women's Army Corps Center and School (Fort McClellan, Alabama) [1952 – 1976].
- In Theater OCS (1942–1945) The Pacific Theater of Operations had OCS at Camp Columbia, Australia, New Caledonia and Natambua, Fiji Islands. The European Theater of Operation had OCS at Fontainebleau, France, Shrivenham, England and Santa Agata Dei, Mediterranean Region.

== Training ==
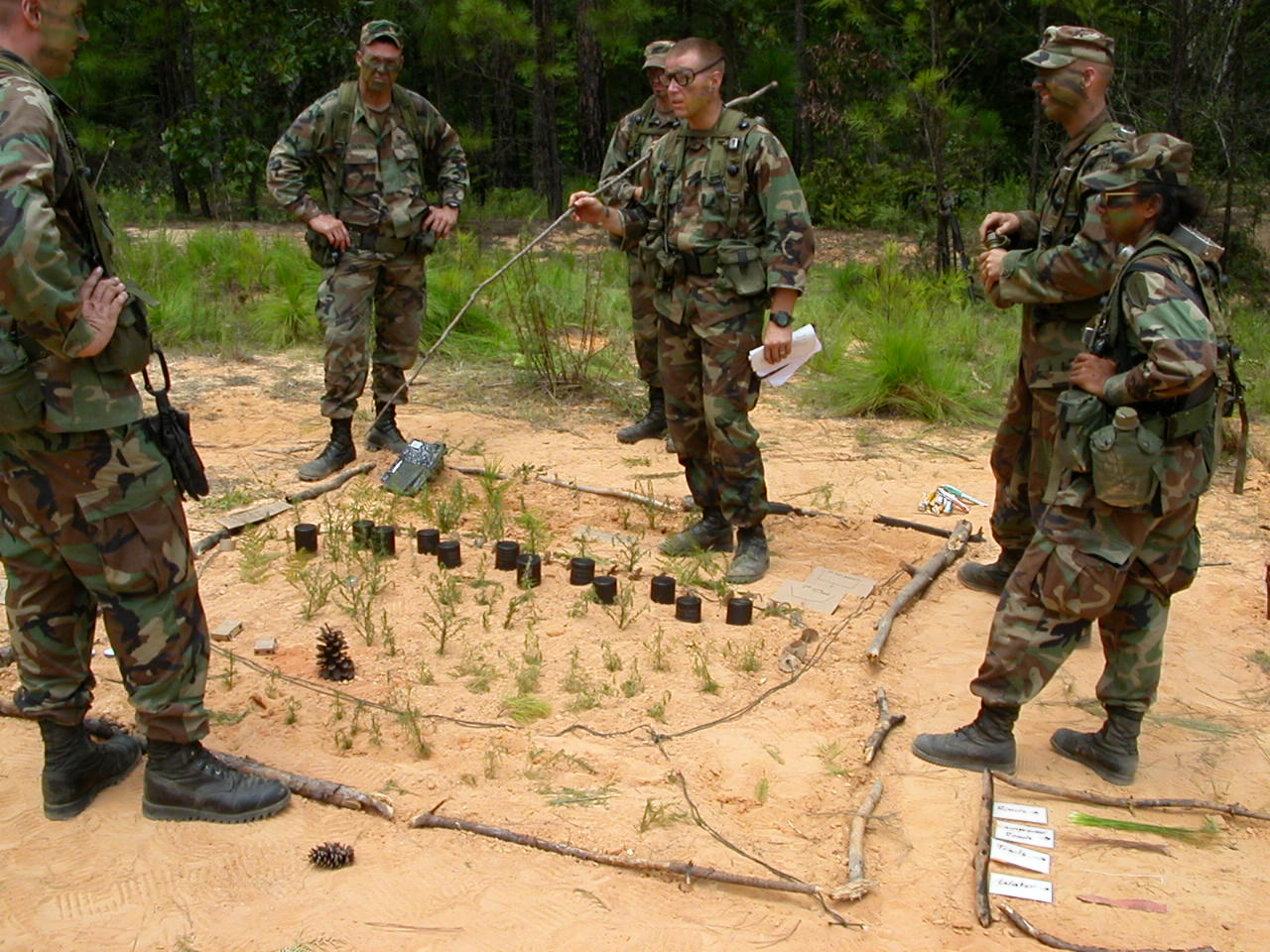
OCS Candidates preparing for a mission on a "terrain model".

OCS is offered in three aspects: Federal, Accelerated, and Traditional. Federal OCS is a 12-week-long school, taught "in residence" at Fort Benning, Georgia. The primary purpose is to commission Second Lieutenants into the U.S. Army, U.S. Army Reserve and Army National Guard.

=== Federal ===
The Army's Officer Candidate School is programmed to teach basic leadership and soldier tasks, using the infantry battle drills found in Army Field Manual 3–21.8 as a framework for instruction and evaluation of leadership potential. A total of 71 tasks are taught and tested while at OCS. A candidate should expect to be under constant observation and evaluation by their cadre. Mental and emotional stress is induced through a variety of controlled methods, to test problem-solving and moral resolve. Additionally, the course is meant to be physically demanding, with several tactical road marches and timed runs of distance from 2 miles to 4 miles. Beginning with the first class of FY 2008, the calendar length of OCS was shortened from 14 weeks to 12 weeks, thus allowing for more classes to be conducted each fiscal year, thereby raising the maximum capacity of the school to train Second Lieutenants to meet future commissioning needs as the Army grows. The current capacity of each class that is conducted is limited to 160 officer candidates.

Officer Candidate School is conducted in three phases: Basic Phase, Intermediate Phase, and Senior phase. Students are referred to as either Basic Officer Candidates (BOCs), Intermediate Officer Candidates (IOCs), or Senior Officer Candidates (SOCs) as their classes progress. Initially, upon arrival, the candidates will in-process with HHC and compete via the Army Fitness Test to enter an OCS company. Once assigned to a class, the candidates have no privileges and enter into a highly controlled environment; although they are expected to act like leaders and take charge and responsibility immediately. As candidates progress through the course, they may earn some limited privileges. Their bearing, deportment, and behavior, both individually and collectively, will affect the return of their privileges.

BOCs are identified by wearing a black ascot. The basic phase will test candidates academically as well as physically; all events are scored comprising the Order of Merit (OML) list used for branch selection. After completion of the Basic phase, transition to the Intermediate phase will occur. The IOCs are identified with a light blue ascot. The intermediate phase continues with more difficult academic training as well as field and tactical instruction. After a two and a half week field exercise in which candidates are tested on their confidence and their ability to lead Soldiers, Active Duty candidates select their branch based on the amount of slots available for each branch. Officer Candidates can only branch into 16 of the 17 slots available, with two needing special conditions complete prior to or upon arriving to OCS. Shortly after branching, Candidates will test into the Senior Phase. SOCs are identified by wearing a white ascot. The last phase consists of final exams in academics, physical fitness, peer evaluations, final TAC (Training, Advising, and Counseling) Officer assessments, interviews, and preparation for graduation and follow-on basic officer branch courses. Sometimes, graduates are offered 'walk-on' slots in Fort Benning's Airborne or Air Assault schools since they are under the same higher training command as OCS.

In September 2010, OCS implemented a policy of total immersion. This system removes the possibility of candidates earning on- or off-post passes and using their vehicles during the first 6 weeks of school, restricts the consumption of alcohol to 2 designated days during the course, and prohibits students to carry cell phones while in uniform.

According to various sources the overall pass rate for federal OCS is consistently in between 80 and 90 percent. In 2022, the attrition rate was only at 10.7 percent, meaning 89.3 percent of all candidates passed, which is 894 out 1001.

All candidates are commissioned as Second Lieutenants upon graduation.

=== Accelerated & Traditional ===
The programs at the Army National Guard RTIs are offered in two different formats to accommodate both Reserve and National Guard component soldiers. The "Traditional" OCS program is a 16-month course of instruction conducted from March to August of the following year and is broken down into four phases.

- Phase Zero – is three to four drill weekends and designed to prepare Officer Candidates for the OCS program.
- Phase I – is a 15-day annual training period held in the summer.
- Phase II – is conducted one weekend per month for a period of 13 months.
- Phase III – is a final 15-day annual training period, culminating with graduation and commissioning.

The Army National Guard also offers an "Accelerated" OCS program, which is a 56-day, full-time program. The Accelerated program is the most physically and mentally demanding program and while the majority of candidates for the Accelerated program are already enlisted soldiers, the failure rate is consistently over 40%.

Upon successful completion of either OCS program, graduates are eligible for commissioning as a Second Lieutenant pending federal recognition. There are requirements that allow basic qualification for entrance into OCS for the Army Reserve and Army National Guard. The Army Regulation (AR) that governs OCS is AR 350–51. Candidates must have at least 90 credits from an accredited college, approval from the state RTI board, and falling in the age range of 18 to 41 years.

==== Basic Officer Leadership Course (BOLC) ====
In 2009, the Army streamlined the officer training pipeline by removing BOLC II and renaming BOLC I to BOLC-A and BOLC III to BOLC-B. Three weeks of training were added to BOLC-B which includes basic soldiering skills such as land navigation and weapons qualification. Thus, three separate schools were combined into two. Today's 'BOLC' was formerly known as the Officer Basic Course (OBC).

== Selection ==
The journey for a prospective Officer Candidate will begin with a visiting a U.S. Army Recruiter. After the initial interview, the Recruiter will help create a packet for OCS for submission to the U.S. Army Recruiting Command.

After completing the initial interview the prospective officer candidate will take the ASVAB and need to make at least a 110 GT score. The prospective candidate then must complete a short essay about why they want to become an Army Officer, provide identification (usually a birth certificate and Social Security card), pass a background check, provide a minimum of 3 letters of recommendation, and complete a physical medical exam.

After successful completion of these steps, the Officer Candidate will be scheduled to conduct an interview board. The interview board is conducted by three officers, usually two Captains and headed by a Major. Upon successfully passing the interview board the prospective Officer Candidate will be screened by U.S. Army Recruiting Command. Once accepted into the program, the Officer Candidate will have a week to enlist into the U.S. Army or Army Reserve. Applicants seeking to become Officers within the Army National Guard have the option to attend Federal OCS upon enlistment as a “09S.” Alternatively, they can attend Traditional & Accelerated OCS programs conducted by state RTIs.

== The Officer Candidate School Hall of Honor ==
The U.S. Army Officer Candidate School Hall of Honor was established in 1958 to honor infantry officer graduates of the Officer Candidate School Program who distinguished themselves in military or civilian pursuits. In 2002, it was opened to graduates from all U.S. Army Officer Candidate Schools from across the history of the U.S. Army. It is hosted at the National Infantry Museum in Columbus, Georgia, which also hosts the U.S. Army Ranger Hall of Honor.

=== Officer Candidate School Hall of Fame ===
Among the OCS Hall of Honor exhibits include the OCS Hall of Fame. It features over 2,000 inductees whose biographies and portraits can be explored in a digital kiosk.

Selection and induction into the Hall of Fame is not guaranteed and is based on several criteria. The inductee may be commissioned from any active component Army OCS program and must have accomplished at least one of the following:

- Awarded the Medal of Honor
- Attained the rank of colonel while serving on active duty or the reserves.
- Elected or appointed to an office of prominence in the national or state government.
- Achieved national or state recognition for outstanding service to the nation.
- Attained an exceptional wartime service record.

==== Notable members of the Hall of Fame ====
There are over two thousand inductees; a few representative examples are listed here:

- Hugh J. Addonizio, politician
- Daniel P. Driscoll, Secretary of the Army
- William F. Buckley, Jr., political commentator
- Robert J. Dole, U.S. Senator from Kansas and presidential candidate
- Winthrop Rockefeller, politician
- Caspar Weinberger, Secretary of Defense during the Reagan administration
- General Tommy Franks
- General Robert C. Kingston
- General Frederick J. Kroesen, Jr.
- General John Shalikashvili
- General John N. Abrams
- Lieutenant General Michael S. Tucker
- Lieutenant General David S. Weisman
- Lieutenant General Michael Nagata
- Major General George F. Close, Jr.
- Major General Michael D. Healy
- Major General Keith Ware
- Major General Phillip Kaplan
- Major General William J. McCaddin
- Major General William F. Garrison
- Brigadier General Julia A. Kraus
- Brigadier General Belinda Pinckney
- Colonel Gerald E. Ferguson, Jr.
- Colonel Leland B. Fair
- Colonel Ronald F. Fraser
- Colonel John L. Insani
- Colonel Leo J. Meyer
- Colonel Robert Nett
- Colonel Frank Norton
- Colonel Alan Reich
- Colonel Rick Rescorla
- Colonel Archibald D. Scott III
- Colonel Carolyn R. Sharpe
- Colonel Robert F. Staake
- Colonel John Ionoff
- Colonel Frank Harman
- Lieutenant Colonel Don C. Faith, Jr.
- Lieutenant Colonel Wilbur A. "Sid" Sidney
- Major Dick Winters, subject of the television miniseries Band of Brothers
- Lieutenant Jimmie Monteith
- Lieutenant Thomas Wigle
- Lieutenant Donald Prell, venture capitalist and futurist

== US Army OCS Alumni Association ==
The United States Army Officer Candidate Schools Alumni Association (USAOCSAA) : is the alumni association for the United States Army Officer Candidate Schools (OCS) past, present, and future regardless of location and includes Army National Guard OCS. It is incorporated in the State of Georgia as a 501 C(19) not for profit, war veterans organization. It is led by 13 directors, all graduates, 5 of which form the executive committee. The executive committee is led by the president and chief executive officer, who acts as the executive director. The current president and chief executive officer is Colonel (Ret.) Frank L Harman III.

The mission of the association is to serve and honor the OCS program and its graduates; and its purpose is to further the ideals and promote the welfare of the Officer Candidate Schools, the Officer Corps and the US Army.

USAOCSAA supports the OCS Battalion and the OCS Program by sponsoring each OCS class with resources to assist with class events and graduation awards. USAOCSAA also sponsors major events, annual awards, and ceremonies and facilities on the OCS campus which include the Annual OCS Alumni Reunion, the Patterson Award, the OCS Hall of Fame, the OCS Memorial Walk and the OCS Heritage Center in Wigle Hall. USAOCSAA acknowledges and recognizes alumni and cadre with monuments in the OCS Memorial Walk, Decorating National War memorials in the National Mall and the Tomb of the Unknown Soldier, Award of the Order of Saint Maurice, distinguished and honorary members of the 11th Infantry Regiment and the annual Colonel Robert Nett Award. USAOCSAA communicates with its members and educates the public on the vital role of OCS by operating the USAOCSAA Web Site, providing articles to national publications, publishing their Quarterly Newsletter, and a Bi-Weekly Email Updates to its members.

=== Colonel Robert Nett Award ===
The purpose of the Nett Award is "to remember and continue to honor the service of Colonel Robert B. Nett to our country, the Army, and the OCS program" and "to recognize and honor annually an OCS Hall of Fame or OCS Alumni Association member or current and former cadre who has provided superior support and advocacy to the OCS program". The Nett Award is presented by the USAOCSAA president and the Senior Maneuver Center representative at the USAOCSAA alumni dinner.

The criterion is: "the nominee, through years of continued service, support, and action, best represents and has contributed to the OCS Alumni Association mission and purpose".

==== Recipients ====
Recipients of the award are as follows:

- 2017 – Colonel John Ionoff
- 2018 – Colonel Frank Harman
- 2019 – Lieutenant Colonel Edgar S. Burroughs
- 2020 – Captain Danny Leifel
- 2021 – Colonel Thomas Evans
- 2022 – Lieutenant Donald Dare
- 2023 – Colonel David Taylor

== OCS Alma Mater ==
The school's alma mater is:

Far across the Chattahoochee
To the Upatoi
OCS our Alma Mater
The Army’s pride and joy!

Forward ever backward never
Faithfully we strive
To the ports of embarkation
Follow me with pride.

When it's time and we are called
To guard our country's might
We'll be there with our heads held high
in peacetime and in fight.

Yearning ever, failing never
To guard the memory
The call is clear, we must meet the task
For freedom’s never free!

== See also ==
- Military academy
- Air Force Officer Training School
- Officer Candidate School
- Noncommissioned officer candidate course
- Officer Candidates School (United States Marine Corps)
- Officer Candidate School (United States Navy)
- Training and Doctrine Command
- Warrant Officer Candidate School
