= Robert B. Nett =

United States Army Medal of Honor recipient (1922–2008)

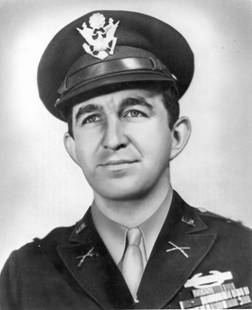
- Robert Nett
- Born: June 13, 1922; New Haven, Connecticut
- Died: October 19, 2008 (aged 86); Fort Benning, Georgia
- Burial place: Fort Benning Main Post Cemetery, Georgia
- Military career
- Allegiance: USA
- Branch: United States Army
- Service years: 1940–1978
- Rank: Colonel
- Units: 2nd Battalion, 305th Infantry Regiment, 77th Infantry Division
- Conflicts: World War II; Philippines Campaign; Korean War; Vietnam War
- Awards: Medal of Honor; Legion of Merit; Bronze Star (3); Purple Heart (2); Meritorious Service Medal; Air Medal; Commendation Medal

Robert Burton Nett (June 13, 1922 – October 19, 2008) was a United States Army officer and a recipient of the U.S. military's highest decoration, the Medal of Honor, for his actions during the campaign to recapture the Philippines in World War II.

== Early life ==
A resident of New Haven, Connecticut, Nett enlisted in the Connecticut National Guard in 1940 at age 17. The minimum enlistment age was 18 years, but Nett was able to join by creasing his birth certificate so that his year of birth was obscured. His initial assignment was with the 102nd Infantry Regiment, part of the 43rd Infantry Division. Two years later, he was stationed at Fort Benning, Georgia, where he was graduated from Officer Candidate School. Nett was then sent to the Philippines, where he met his future wife, Frances, an Army nurse.

== World War II ==
By December 14, 1944, Nett was a lieutenant in Company E of the 305th Infantry Regiment, 77th Infantry Division. On that day, near Cognon, Leyte, during the Battle of Ormoc Bay, Nett led his company in an assault against a heavily fortified Japanese position. Despite being seriously wounded twice in hand-to-hand fighting, he continued to lead his men until being wounded a third time. After making arrangements for the leadership of his company, he left the front lines to seek medical aid.

Nett was able to rejoin his unit for the Okinawa Campaign. His division was then sent to Cebu and began training for the planned invasion of Japan. The operation was canceled after the surrender of Japan in August 1945.

On February 8, 1946, Nett was awarded the Medal of Honor for his actions at Cognon. A ceremony was held in his hometown of New Haven, and President Harry S. Truman was to have presented him with the medal there, but had to cancel in order to attend to the formation of the United Nations in California, Nett told a reporter.

== Medal of Honor citation ==
Nett's official Medal of Honor citation reads:

He commanded Company E in an attack against a reinforced enemy battalion which had held up the American advance for 2 days from its entrenched positions around a 3-story concrete building. With another infantry company and armored vehicles, Company E advanced against heavy machinegun and other automatic weapons fire with Lt. Nett spearheading the assault against the strongpoint. During the fierce hand-to-hand encounter which ensued, he killed 7 deeply entrenched Japanese with his rifle and bayonet and, although seriously wounded, gallantly continued to lead his men forward, refusing to relinquish his command. Again he was severely wounded, but, still unwilling to retire, pressed ahead with his troops to assure the capture of the objective. Wounded once more in the final assault, he calmly made all arrangements for the resumption of the advance, turned over his command to another officer, and then walked unaided to the rear for medical treatment. By his remarkable courage in continuing forward through sheer determination despite successive wounds, Lt. Nett provided an inspiring example for his men and was instrumental in the capture of a vital strongpoint.

== Postwar life ==
Nett continued to serve in the Army after the war. He graduated from the Infantry School Advanced Course in 1952 and the Army Command and General Staff College in 1958 and completed a B.S. degree at the University of Maryland in 1964. Nett also served in both the Korean War and the Vietnam War. In 1978, he retired from the Army after 38 years of service at the rank of colonel. Nett gave frequent talks on leadership and duty, lecturing to every class of the Officer Candidate School (OCS); he was frequently invited to speak to the Ranger Regiment at Fort Benning. He is considered the "Father of the Officer Candidate School".

He was inducted into the Army Ranger Hall of Fame and the Officer Candidate School Hall of Fame, an honor reserved for OCS graduates who received the Medal of Honor or rose to the rank of colonel or higher. He achieved both. After his retirement, he spent 17 years as a teacher in the Columbus, Georgia, school system and frequently spoke to classes at the United States Army Infantry School at Fort Benning.

Nett died on October 19, 2008. He was survived by his wife, Frances, of Columbus, Georgia. Their son, Major Robert Nett Jr. (1954–2012), also served in the U.S. Army.

== Awards and decorations ==

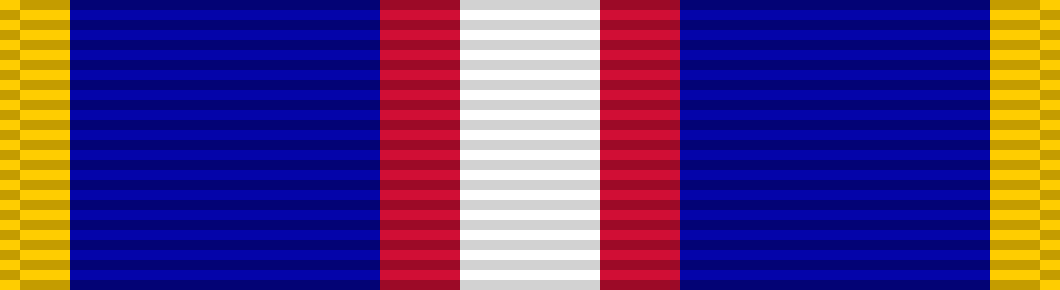

Badge	Combat Infantryman Badge with star denoting 2nd award		
1st row	Medal of Honor	Legion of Merit	Bronze Star Medal with "V" Device and 2 Oak leaf clusters
2nd row	Purple Heart with 1 Oak leaf cluster	Meritorious Service Medal	Air Medal
3rd row	Army Commendation Medal	Army Good Conduct Medal	American Defense Service Medal
4th row	American Campaign Medal	Asiatic-Pacific Campaign Medal with Arrowhead Device and 4 Campaign stars	World War II Victory Medal
5th row	Army of Occupation Medal with 'Japan' clasp	National Defense Service Medal with 1 Oak leaf cluster	Korean Service Medal with 2 Campaign stars
6th row	Vietnam Service Medal with 1 Campaign star	Philippine Independence Medal	Philippine Liberation Medal with 1 Campaign star
7th row	United Nations Service Medal Korea	Vietnam Campaign Medal	Korean War Service Medal
Badge	Glider Badge		Air Assault Badge
Tab	Ranger Tab		
Unit awards	Meritorious Unit Commendation		
Unit awards	Philippine Presidential Unit Citation	Korean Presidential Unit Citation	Republic of Vietnam Unit Gallantry Cross

== Namesakes ==
- Camp Nett, Connecticut National Guard training center in Niantic, Connecticut.
- COL Robert B. Nett building, The Fort Benning OCS classroom.
- COL (R) Robert B. Nett Leadership Award is awarded to the Distinguished Leadership Graduate (DLG), the second highest honor bestowed upon a Candidate at OCS.
- Colonel Robert B. Nett Medal of Honor Highway , 5-mile stretch of US 280/SR 520 (Martha Berry Highway) through Fort Benning.
- COL Robert Nett Leadership Hall, the leadership hall for the Connecticut National Guard at Camp Niantic (later renamed Camp Nett) in Niantic.
- Nett Warrior, a dismounted battle command system (Ground Soldier), named for Colonel Nett in 2010.
- In January 2007 the United Service Organizations (USO) awarded him its Spirit of Hope Award.

== See also ==
- List of Medal of Honor recipients for World War II
