= Alan Reich =

American disability activist (1930–2005)

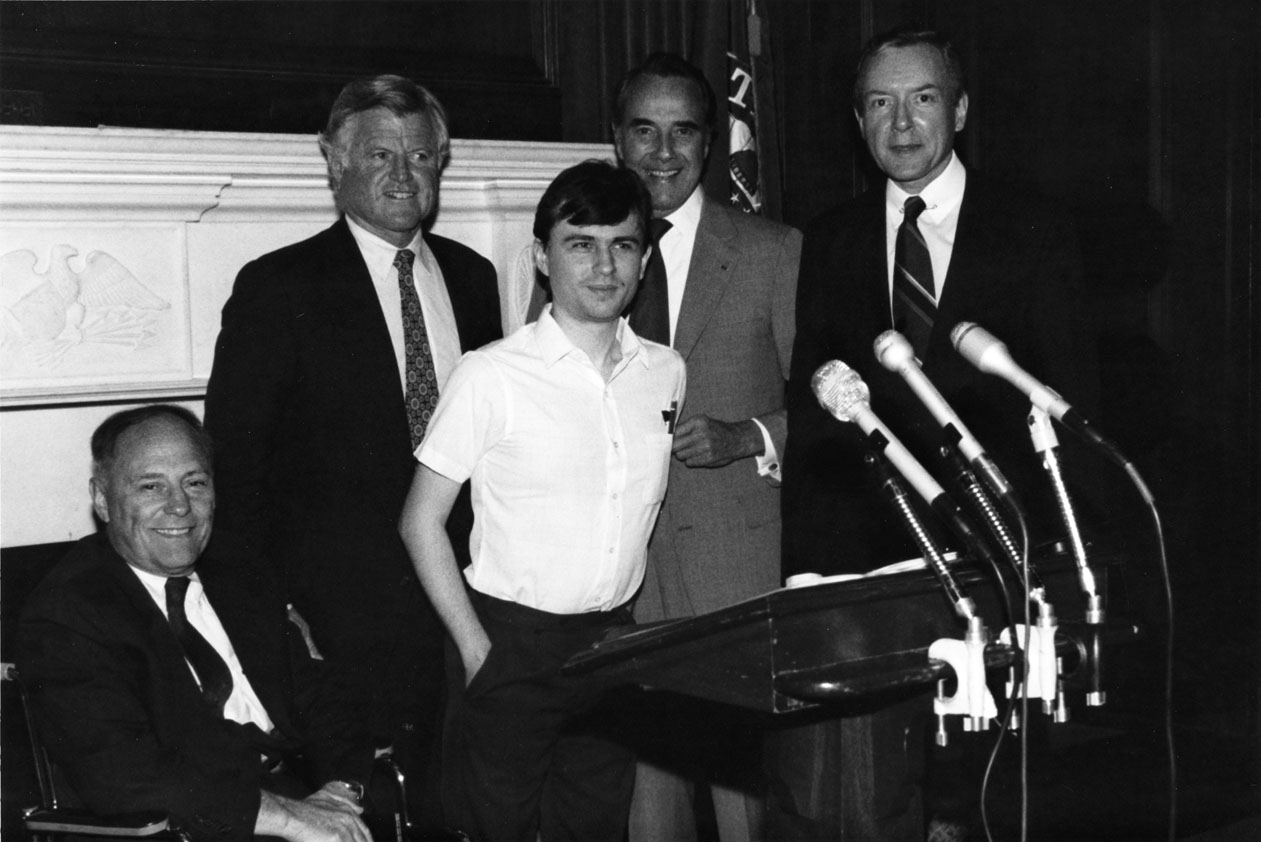
- Born: January 1, 1930; Pearl River, New York, US
- Died: November 8, 2005 (aged 75); Mclean, Virginia, US
- Education: Harvard Business School (MBA); Oxford University (Masters); Middlebury College Russian School; Dartmouth College (B.S.)
- Occupations: Founder and President of National Organization on Disability; U.S. Deputy Assistant Secretary of State for Educational and Cultural Affairs in 1970; Executive in Manufacturing Management and Corporate Long-range Planning at Polaroid
- Successor: Carol Glazor
- Board member of: National Organization on Disability; U.S. Council for the International Year of the Disabled; Franklin D. Roosevelt International Disability Award; People-to-people Committee; Board member of Paralysis Cure Research Foundation; Board member of National Paraplegia Foundation
- Awards: George H. W. Bush Award; AARP Impact Award 06'

Alan Anderson Reich (January 1, 1930 – November 8, 2005) was the founder of the National Organization on Disability. In 1962 Reich sustained severe spinal injuries in a diving accident, making him a wheelchair user for the rest of his life. Afterwards, Reich returned to Polaroid where he served as an executive in manufacturing management and corporate long-range planning until 1970, when he became the U.S. Deputy Assistant Secretary of State for Educational and Cultural Affairs. In 1982 he founded the National Organization on Disability.

== Early life ==
Reich was born in Pearl River, New York, and graduated from Dartmouth College in New Hampshire, where he was an all-American track and field athlete. He received a master's degree in Russian literature from Middlebury College in 1953, a diploma in Slavic languages and Eastern European studies from the University of Oxford the same year and a master's degree in business administration from Harvard University in 1959. He spoke five languages.

Reich served as an infantry officer in the U.S. Army and as a Russian-language interrogation officer in Germany.

== Disability rights movement ==
After working in the State Department, Reich's efforts eventually led the United Nations to declare 1981 as the International Year of Disabled Persons, and Reich became president of the organization coordinating American activities in observance of the year: the U.S. Council for the International Year of Disabled Persons. Afterward, leveraging the momentum from these observances, Reich led the council's evolution into an independent organization, the National Organization on Disability.

Three years later, Reich founded the Bimillennium Foundation to further extend the reach of the 1981 event and to encourage leaders of nations worldwide to set year-2000 goals aimed at improving the human condition. In 1990, Reich, along with Richard and Ginny Thornburgh, board members for the National Organization on Disability, persuaded Pope John Paul II to sponsor a 1990 world symposium on disabilities at the Vatican.

Reich also helped to establish the Franklin Delano Roosevelt International Disability Award on October 24, 1995, the 50th anniversary of the United Nations. The award recognizes and encourages progress by nations toward "the full and equal participation of people with disabilities in the economic, social, and cultural life of their countries, regardless of the level of development." The winning country receives a $50,000 cash prize for an outstanding nongovernmental disability organization in the selected nation, which is presented to the head of state at an annual ceremony at the UN. The winner also accepts a replica of the statue of FDR in his wheelchair situated at the FDR National Memorial — the only public monument in the world of a head of state with a disability. The creation and placement of the statue were a direct result of efforts led by Reich, NOD, the Franklin and Eleanor Roosevelt Institute, and the World Committee on Disability, which Reich chaired and is co-headquartered with the NOD.

Immediately after the September 11, 2001 terrorist attacks, Reich organized the leaders of disability groups to make sure that planning for future emergencies included accommodations for people with disabilities.

In addition to his other achievements, Reich served on the People-to-People Committee on Disability, and the boards of the Paralysis Cure Research Foundation and the National Paraplegia Foundation. He was the first wheelchair user to address the United Nations and has had an audience with the pope.

Reich’s views on the disabled community involved blending in with the general population. In an article on a controversial wheelchair add by John Box, “Alan Reich, president of the National Organization on Disability, said the ads may ultimately do harm to the cause. ‘Just generally it's something that I find tasteless and offensive,’ he said. ‘Whether we like it or not, people with disabilities tend to stand out and have greater attention paid to them, and this really adds an unnecessary and offensive element. . . . The direction I'd prefer to be going is {disabled} people blending into the scene along with everyone else, and distinguishing themselves for their accomplishments and contributions and participation.’"

== Awards and honors ==
- Alan Reich was one of ten honorees of the AARP Impact Award in 2006 for his work as a disability activist.
- He received the George Bush Medal for his work on behalf of people with disabilities.
- He was named a member of the Officer Candidate School (U.S. Army) Hall of Fame.
