= National Infantry Museum =

Museum in Columbus, Georgia, United States

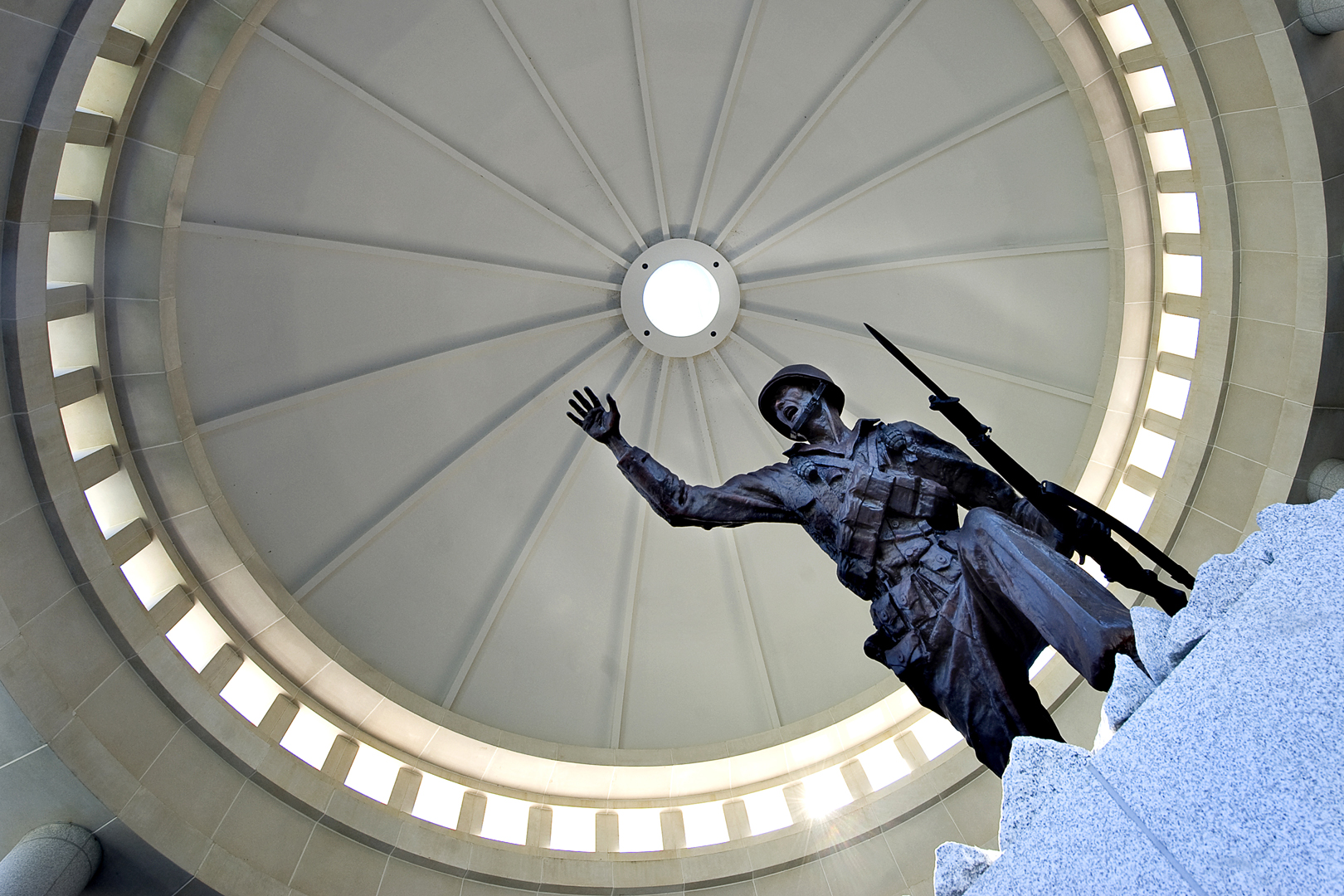
- Established: 2009
- Location: 1775 Legacy Way, Columbus, Georgia 31903, United States
- Coordinates: 32°23′22″N 84°57′19″W
- Visitors: 300,000+ per year
- Director: Scott A. D. Daubert
- Curators: Jefferson C. Reed and Christopher A. Goodrow
- Website: nationalinfantrymuseum.org

The National Infantry Museum and Soldier Center is a museum located in Columbus, Georgia, United States, just outside the Maneuver Center of Excellence at Fort Benning. The 190,000-square-foot (18,000 m^{2}) museum opened in June 2009.

The museum chronicles the history of the United States Army Infantry from the American Revolution to current operations. It exhibits artifacts from all eras of American history and contains interactive multimedia exhibits. The National Infantry Museum emphasizes the values that are meant to define the Infantry, as well as the nation: loyalty, duty, respect, selfless service, honor, integrity, and personal courage.

In addition to galleries, the National Infantry Museum and Soldier Center also consists of:

- Officer Candidate School (OCS) Hall of Honor
  - OCS Hall of Fame
- Ranger Hall of Honor
  - Ranger Hall of Fame
- DownRange Combat Sims and Paradrop VR Simulator
- The Fife and Drum Restaurant *opening times vary*
- Giant Screen Theater
- Heritage Walk
- Inouye Parade Field
- Korean War Memorial
- Memorial Walk of Honor
- Vietnam Memorial Plaza
- Global War on Terrorism Memorial
- The Soldier Store Gift Shop
- World War II Company Street.

Until April 2008, the museum was housed in the former Fort Benning Post Hospital. Space and conditions for the museum’s collection were inadequate. In 1998, the 501(c)(3) National Infantry Foundation was formed to plan, raise funds for and to operate a new museum. The National Infantry Museum Foundation has since formed a formal partnership with the Army to manage the facility and its contents. The National Infantry Museum does not receive federal, state or city funding. Through its lease agreement with the National Infantry Museum Foundation, the Army reimburses the foundation for approximately 30 percent of the museum’s annual operating expenses. There is no admission fee. The museum relies on donations, memberships and revenue-generating attractions such as the Giant Screen Theater, DownRange simulators, Fife and Drum Restaurant, Soldier Store and event rentals to cover operating expenses.

The museum is located on a 155-acre campus adjacent to Fort Benning. The campus includes Inouye Field, sprinkled with soil from the battlegrounds of Yorktown, Antietam, Soissons, Normandy, Corregidor, Korea, Vietnam, Iraq, and Afghanistan, and a 2,100-seat stadium which hosts graduations of Army trainees. The graduations are open to the public.

World War II Company Street is a collection of seven buildings constructed at Fort Benning from 1940–1942. They have been refurbished as they were in the 1940s and are open for tours on weekends & by special arrangement. The buildings include a chapel, barracks, mess hall, orderly room, supply room, and the sleeping quarters and headquarters building used by Gen. George Patton while he commanded the 2nd Armored Division at Fort Benning prior to his deployment to North Africa in 1942.

The Vietnam Memorial Plaza contains a ¾-scale replica of the Vietnam Wall on the Mall in Washington, D.C.

The Global War on Terrorism Memorial, dedicated in October 2017, includes the names of more than 7,000 Soldiers, Sailors, Airmen and Marines killed in action since 9/11. A 13-foot steel beam pulled from the wreckage of the World Trade Center and donated to the museum by New York City firefighters is featured in the design of the memorial.

A Korean War Memorial, featuring four larger-than-life bronze statues, was dedicated in 2024. The memorial is located at the end of the Corridor of Valor and Sacrifice, just off of Heritage Walk.

The museum received a Thea Award for excellence from the Themed Entertainment Association in 2011, USA Today’s 2016, 2020 and 2021 Readers’ Choice Award for Best Free Museum, and TripAdvisor’s Hall of Fame recognition for continued excellence.

== Gallery ==
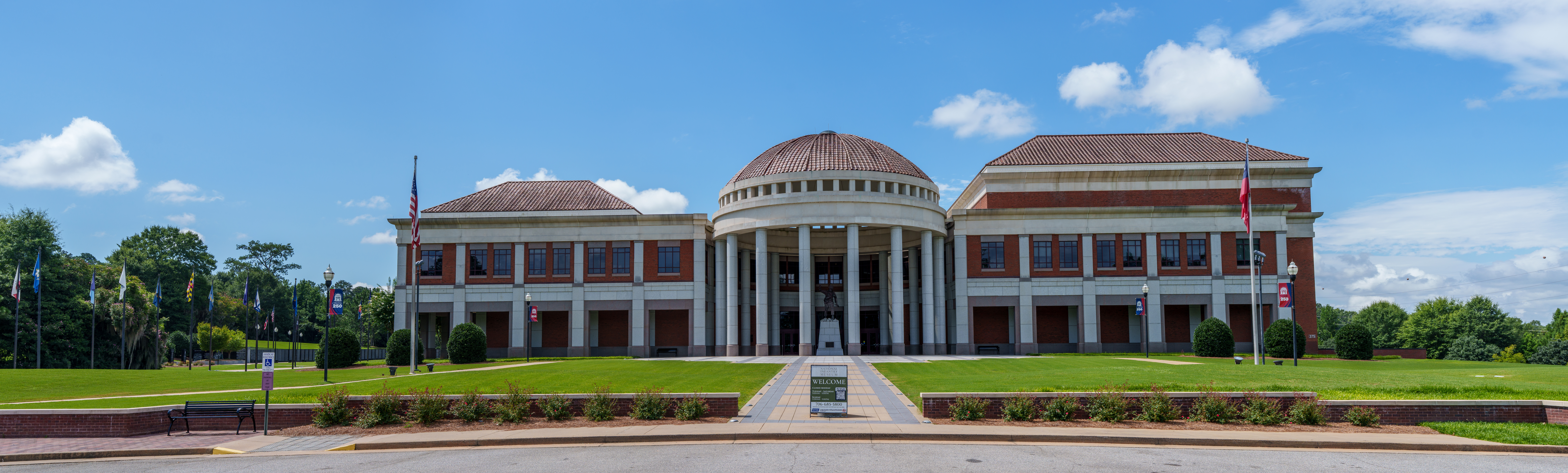
Front entrance

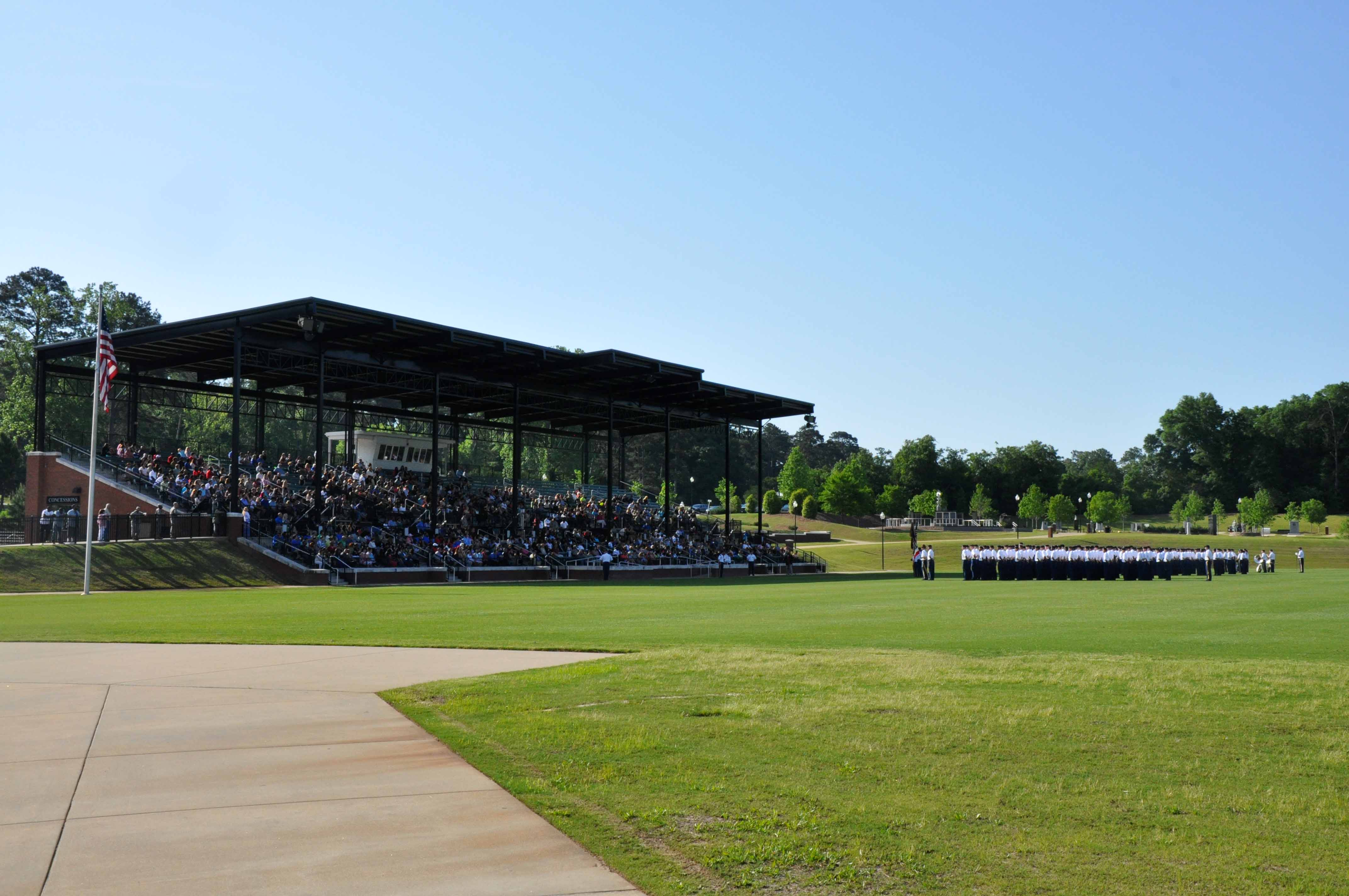
Fort Benning Graduation at Inouye Field.

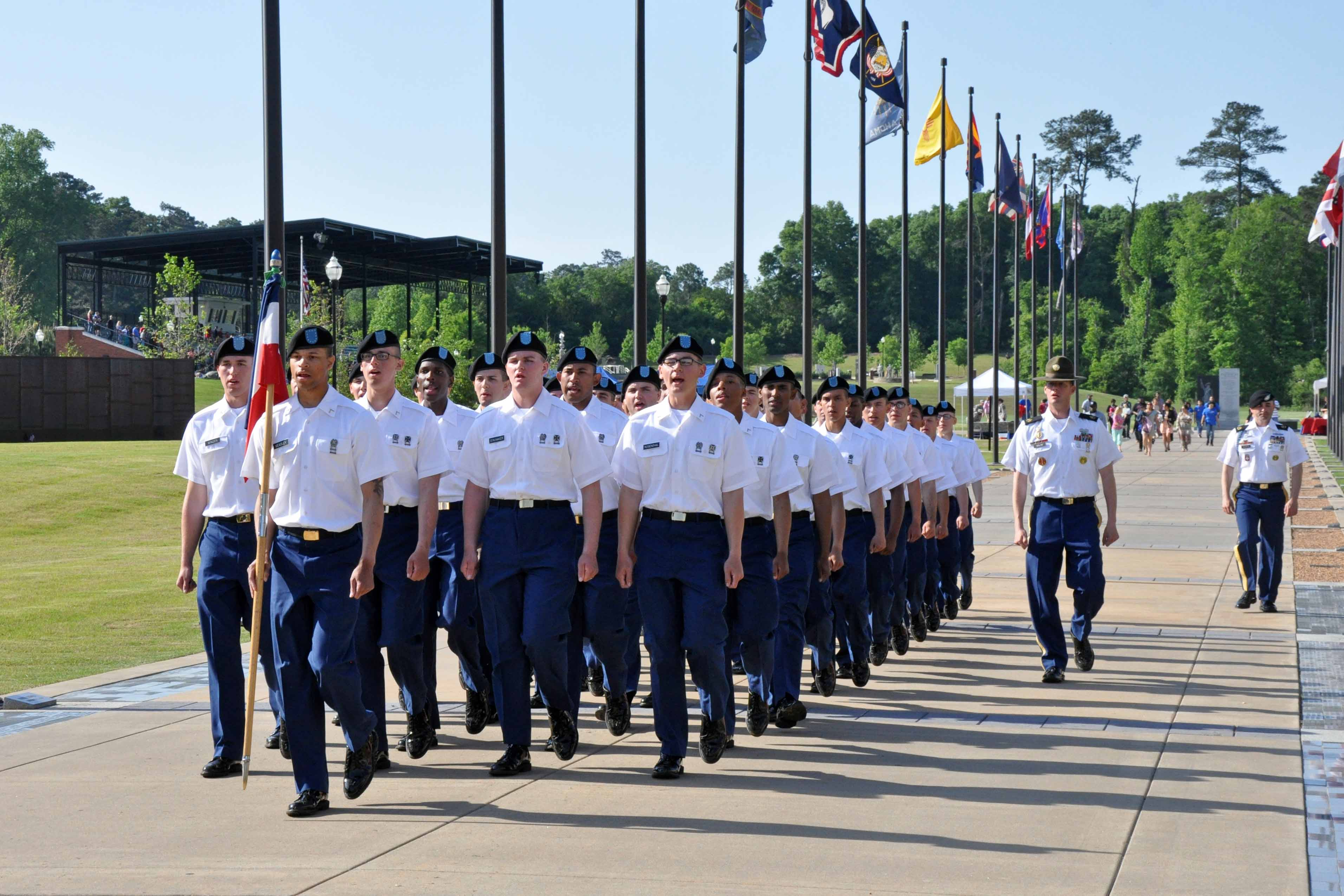
Heritage Walk

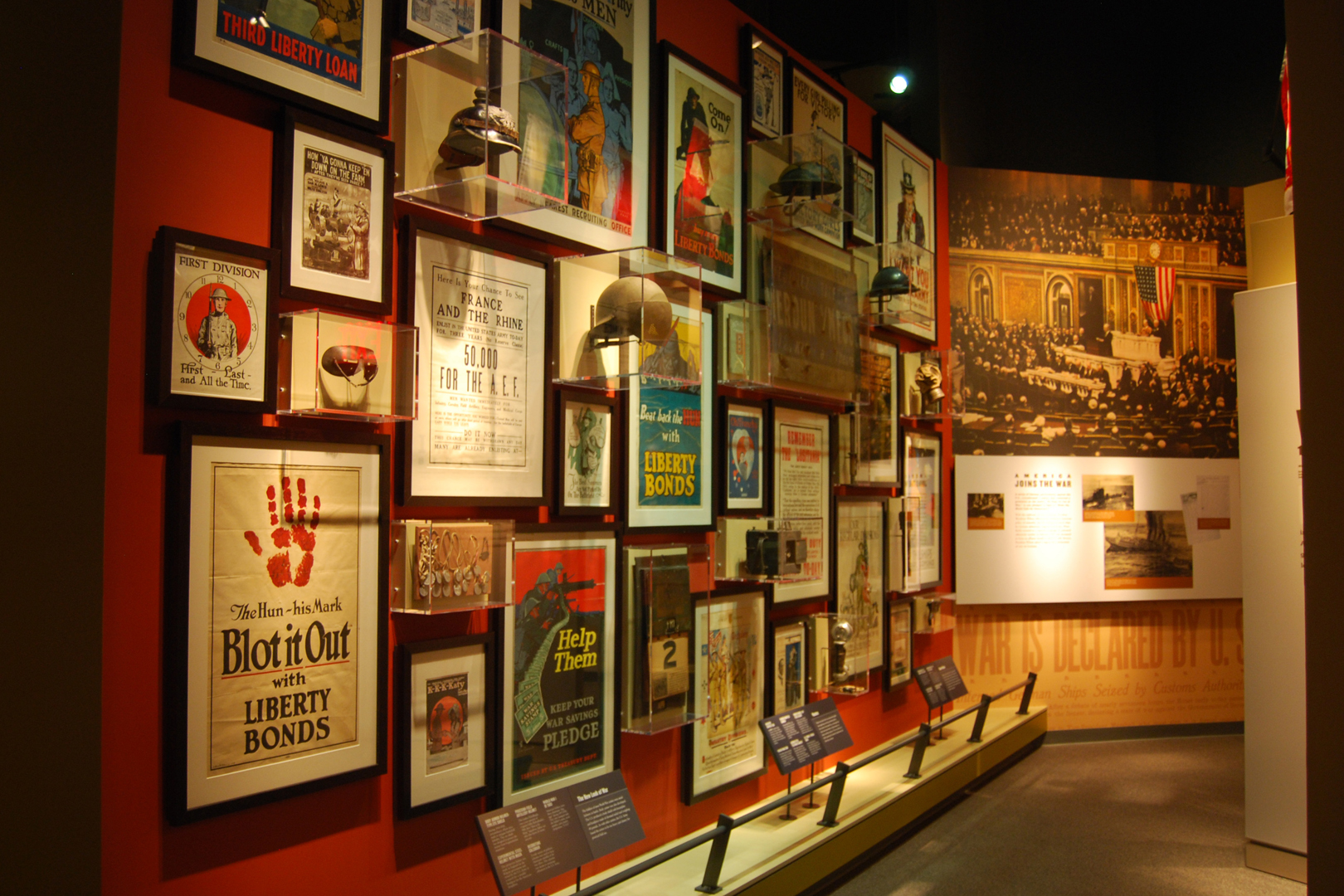
Propaganda Gallery

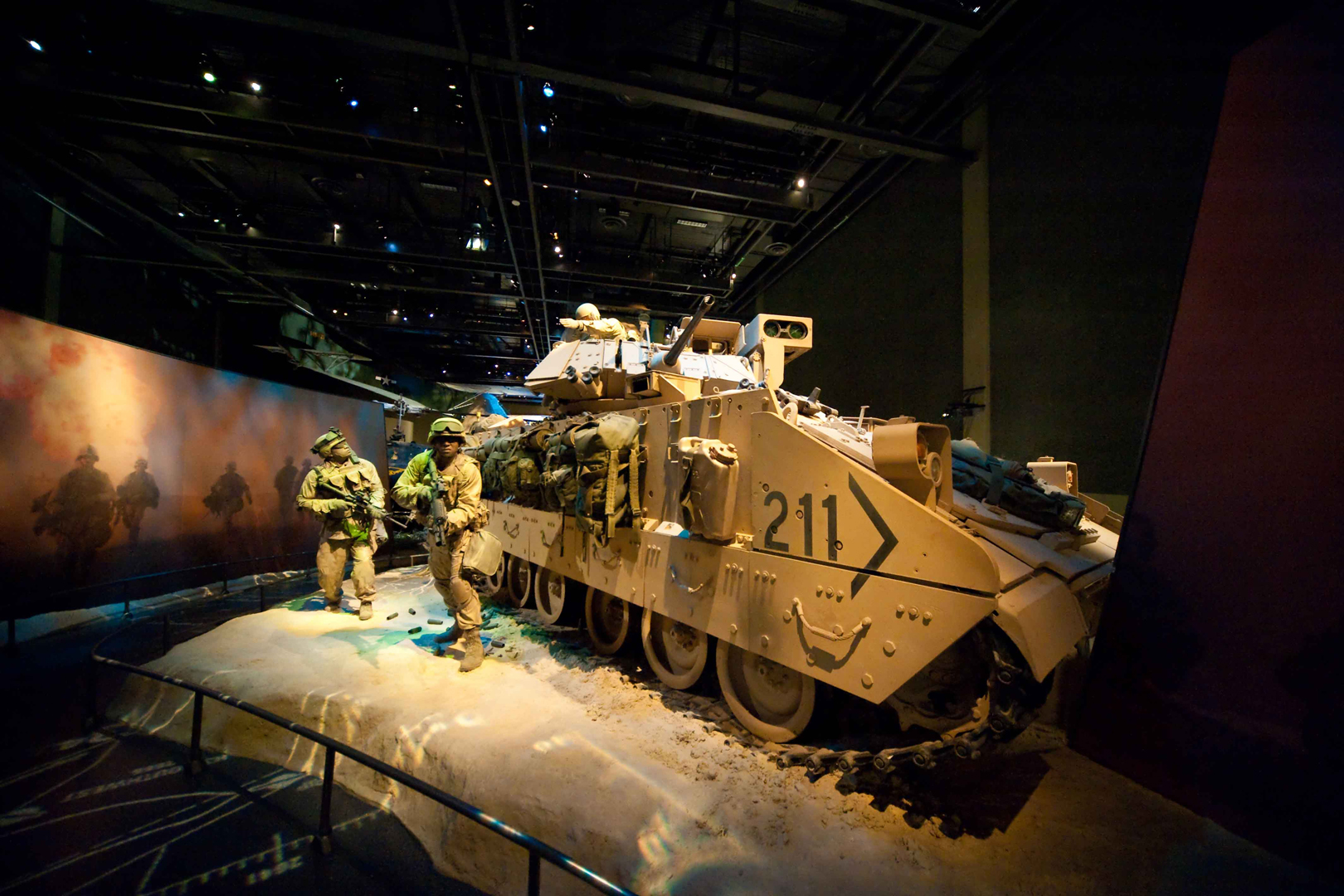
"Infantry Operations in Iraq" Gallery

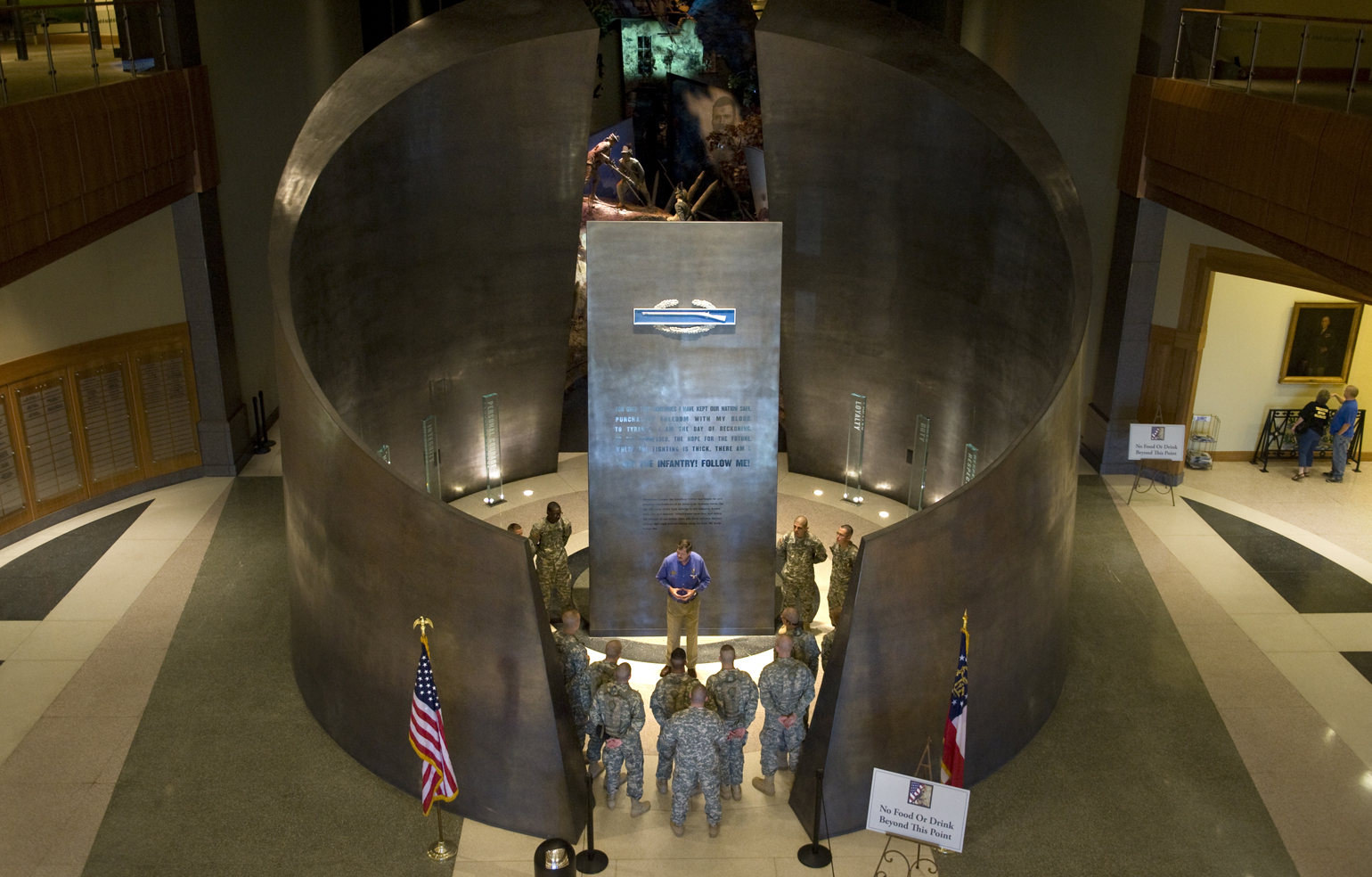
A National Infantry Museum guide starts a presentation on the infantry's history

== Notes and references ==
- Putnam, Walter, "Powell salutes soldiers at museum opening", Military Times (Associated Press), August 2, 2009.
- Williams, Chuck, "Colin Powell speaks at Infantry Museum grand opening", Columbus Ledger-Enquirer, June 20, 2009.
