= Leo J. Meyer =

US Army officer (1917–2006)

Leo John Meyer
- Meyer in 1969
- Born: October 6, 1917; New York, New York
- Died: January 12, 2006 (aged 88)
- Buried: Arlington National Cemetery, Virginia
- Allegiance: United States
- Branch: United States Army
- Service years: 1937-1971
- Rank: Colonel
- Conflicts: World War II: -Leyte Campaign -Luzon Campaign -South Philippines Campaign; Korean War: -CCF Intervention Campaign -1st UN Counteroffensive Campaign -CCF Spring Offensive Campaign -Summer - Fall Offensive Campaign; Vietnam War: -Counteroffensive Phase VI Campaign -Tet 69/Counteroffensive Campaign -Summer-Fall 1969 Campaign
- Awards: Combat Infantryman Badge (3); Soldiers Medal; Bronze Star (3); Purple Heart (2) (partial list)
- Alma mater: University of Maryland BS Mil Sci 1967

Leo J. Meyer (October 6, 1917 - January 12, 2006) was a soldier in the United States Army, one of only three hundred and twenty-four men who have been awarded three Combat Infantryman Badges out of more than the twenty-three million men who served in the US Army between December 1941 and December 2007. Colonel Meyer was inducted into the U.S. Army Officer Candidate School Hall of Fame in 2009.

== Military service ==
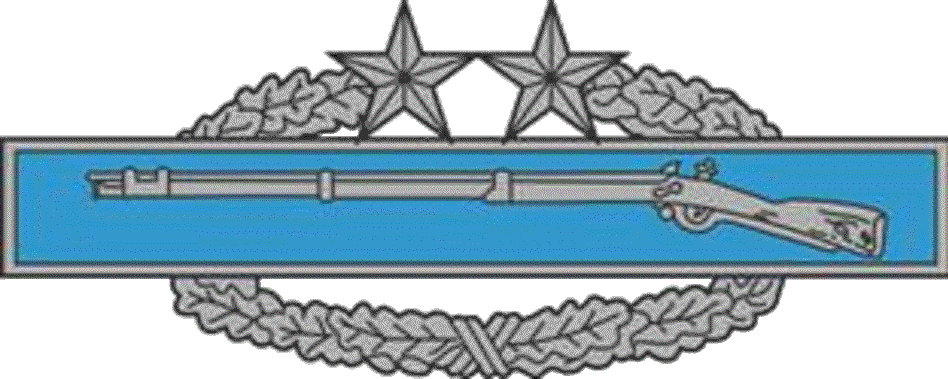
Combat Infantryman Badge, 3rd Award.

In 1936 Leo Meyer joined the New York National Guard 102nd Engineer Regimental Field Music as a bandsman through the NYNG Cadet Corps. In October 1937 he enlisted into Company ‘B’, 102nd Engineer Regiment and by May 1940 he had been promoted to corporal. In October 1940 he was called, with his unit, the 27th Division, to federal service for 12 months training. From December 1941 to December 1942 Meyer served in the Pacific Theater of Operations as a master sergeant in the positions of regimental and battalion sergeant major. In March 1943 he graduated from the US Army Air Forces Officer Candidate School. In 1944 he volunteered for service in the infantry and in June 1945 was serving as a lieutenant in Company ‘A’, 34th Infantry, 24th Infantry Division in the Philippines. Meyer earned his first Combat Infantryman Badge during Operation VICTOR V in the Southern Philippines Campaign.

After serving in occupied Japan as a captain, he mustered out of the Army of the United States and reenlisted in the Army Organized Reserve Corps; by June 1947 he was back on active duty as a Regular Army master sergeant instructing reservists. He re-entered active commissioned service as a 1st lieutenant and served in the 7th Infantry, 3rd Infantry Division at Fort Devens. By November 1950 he was in Korea north of the 38th parallel serving under LTC Thomas O'Neill in 3rd Battalion, which served as the nucleus of "Task Force Dog", the forward element of the covering force for the X Corps’ withdrawal from the Chosin Reservoir. He earned his second Combat Infantryman Badge during the Chinese Communist Forces (CCF) Intervention Campaign (November 1950 to January 1951).

Meyer later served in the Cold War Army as an advisor to the Massachusetts National Guard, a staff officer in Bad Kreuznach, Germany, an operations officer at the Army Disciplinary Barracks in New Cumberland, Pennsylvania and as a Post staff officer at Fort Dix, New Jersey. In 1961 Meyer, a reserve infantry major on the active duty list, reverted to Regular Army warrant officer (CWO4) (in lieu of retiring from the Army) and was assigned as an intelligence technician in the Counter Intelligence Corps. In 1967 he received his Bachelor of Science Degree in Military Science from the University of Maryland and the following year he volunteered again for service in a combat zone. At age 51 he was assigned to 5th Special Forces Group (Airborne), 1st Special Forces, in Nha Trang, Vietnam, where he earned his Jump Wings. Meyer earned his 3rd Combat Infantryman Badge while serving in the Rung Sat Special Zone with the 5th Mobile Strike Force, B55 (December 68 to February 69). In March 1969 he was promoted to colonel in the Army Reserve but continued serving as a military intelligence Regular Army CWO4 on active duty.

From 1969 to 1971 Meyer was again assigned in the Washington, D.C. area as an intelligence technician with the 116th Military Intelligence Group. He retired as a colonel in 1971. Meyer was buried at Arlington National Cemetery on 18 May 2006.

== Honors and awards ==
Colonel Meyer was posthumously inducted into the U.S. Army Officer Candidate School Hall of Fame on March 27, 2009. He is the 2,480th officer so honored. Colonel Meyer's awards include the following:

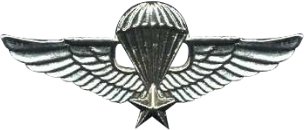

Badge	Combat Infantryman Badge with 2 Stars (denoting 3rd award)		
1st row	Soldier's Medal		Bronze Star with 2 Oak leaf clusters
2nd row	Purple Heart with 1 Oak leaf cluster	Meritorious Service Medal	Air Medal
3rd row	Joint Service Commendation Medal	Army Commendation Medal with 1 Oak leaf cluster	Navy and Marine Corps Commendation Medal with "V" device
4th row	Army Good Conduct Medal	American Defense Service Medal	American Campaign Medal
5th row	Asiatic-Pacific Campaign Medal with 3 Campaign stars	World War II Victory Medal	Army of Occupation Medal (Japan)
6th row	National Defense Service Medal with 1 Service star	Korean Service Medal with 4 Campaign stars	Vietnam Service Medal with 3 Campaign stars
7th row	Armed Forces Reserve Medal with golden Hourglass device	Gallantry Cross Ribbon with Bronze Star	Philippine Liberation Medal with 1 Campaign star
8th row	United Nations Korea Medal	Vietnam Campaign Medal with "60-" clasp	Republic of Korea War Service Medal
Badges	South Vietnamese Parachutist badge		Basic Parachutist Badge
Unit awards	Army Presidential Unit Citation	Army Meritorious Unit Commendation	Philippine Republic Presidential Unit Citation
Unit awards	Republic of Korea Presidential Unit Citation	Vietnam Gallantry Cross Unit Citation (U.S. Army version)	Civil Actions Medal Unit Citation Emblem; First Class (U.S. Army Version)

== Contributions to the arts ==
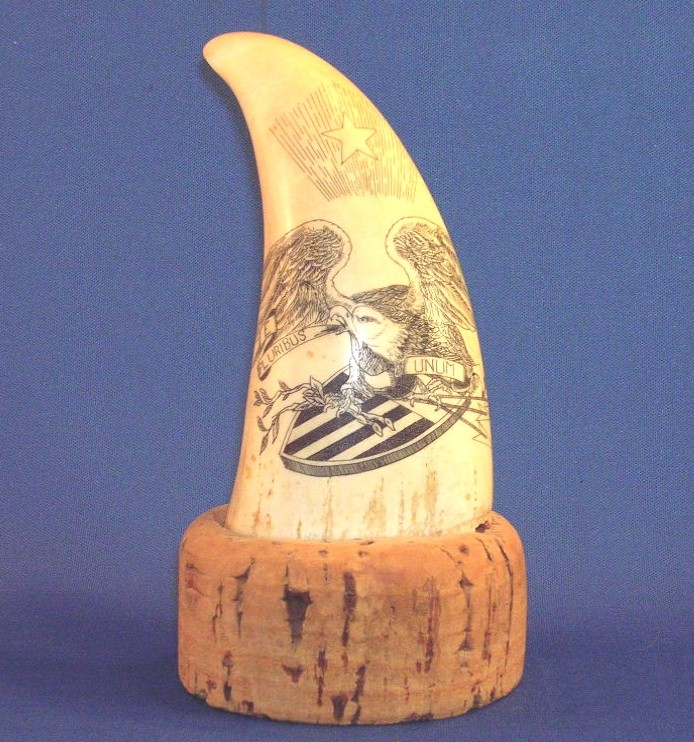
One of several whale teeth scrimshawed by Meyer between 1964 and 1971

In 1953 while assigned in Massachusetts, Meyer met Dr. Ralph Bussler, an osteopathic doctor who had established a business making 54mm lead figures, "Tin soldiers" (soldiers, horses, and weapons) for collectors and war game enthusiasts. He learned how to create and cast the figures and contributed to the Bussler line of civil war sets. Bussler and Meyer figures are featured in the book Making And Collecting Military Miniatures by Bob Bard.

In 1964 while assigned in Honolulu, Meyer learned the art of the American whaler, Scrimshaw (carving on whale ivory) from Richard (Dick) Hull. He carved larger sperm whale teeth with eagles' heads or traditional scenes of ships and whales and smaller pieces for jewelry. During his first assignment in Washington, DC, his art was on exhibit in the Fort Lesley J. McNair Post Library and he participated in the first Smithsonian Institution Festival of American Folklife, July 1967 as a scrimshaw artist. Some of his scrimshaw art is exhibited in the book Scrimshaw: Variations on a Theme by Martha Bowen
