= Chip work =

Engraved glassware used as an artform

Chip work is glassware which has been engraved, or "chipped", using a nail or similar improvised tool, in a similar manner to scrimshaw.

Chip work is a working-class, rustic artform and is usually made using cheap, disposable glass such as wine bottles.
