= Scrimshaw =

Engravings and carvings done in bone or ivory, created by sailors

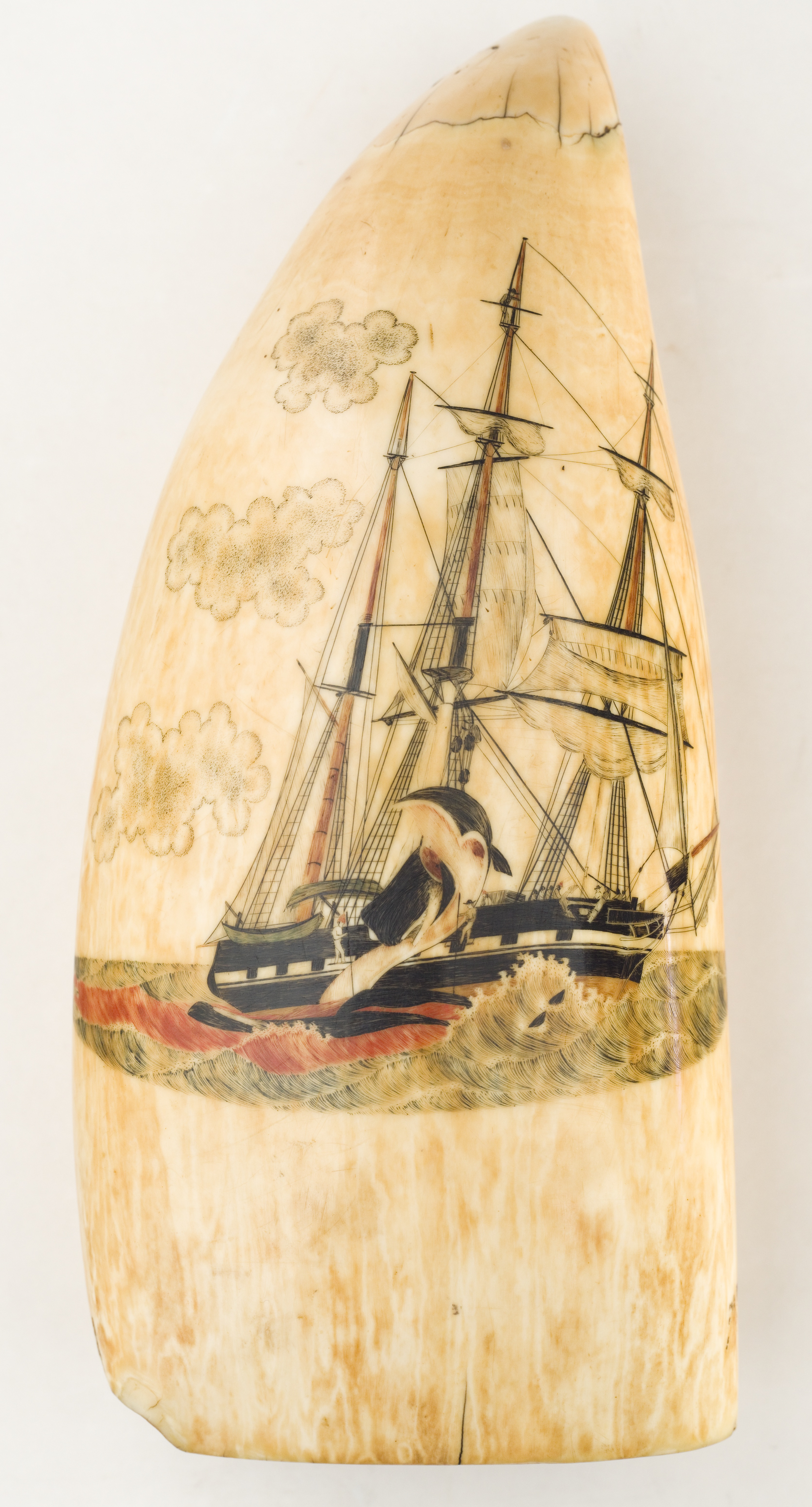
American whaling ships, scrimshaw on whale tooth, c. 1800

Scrimshaw is scrollwork, engravings, and carvings done in bone or ivory. Typically it refers to the artwork created by whalers, engraved on the byproducts of whales, such as bones or cartilage. It is most commonly made out of the bones and teeth of sperm whales, the baleen of other whales, and the tusks of walruses.

It takes the form of elaborate engravings in the form of pictures and lettering on the surface of the bone or tooth, with the engraving highlighted using a pigment, or, less often, small sculptures made from the same material. However, the latter typically fall into the categories of ivory carving, for all carved teeth and tusks, or bone carving. The making of scrimshaw probably began on whaling ships in the late 18th century and survived until the ban on commercial whaling. The practice survives as a hobby and as a trade for commercial artisans. A maker of scrimshaw is known as a scrimshander. The word first appeared in the logbook of the brig By Chance in 1826, but the etymology is uncertain.

== History and materials ==
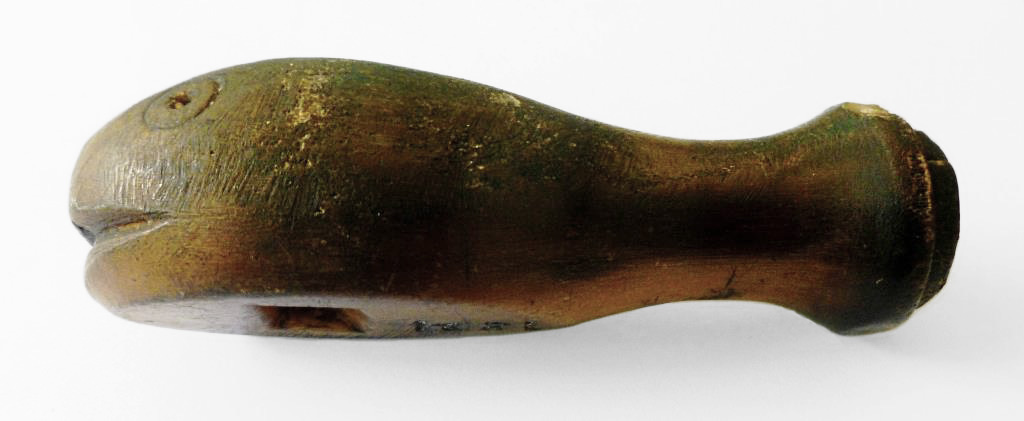
Carved whale bone whistle dated 1821, 8 centimetres (3.1 in) long; belonged to a 'Peeler' in the Metropolitan Police in London

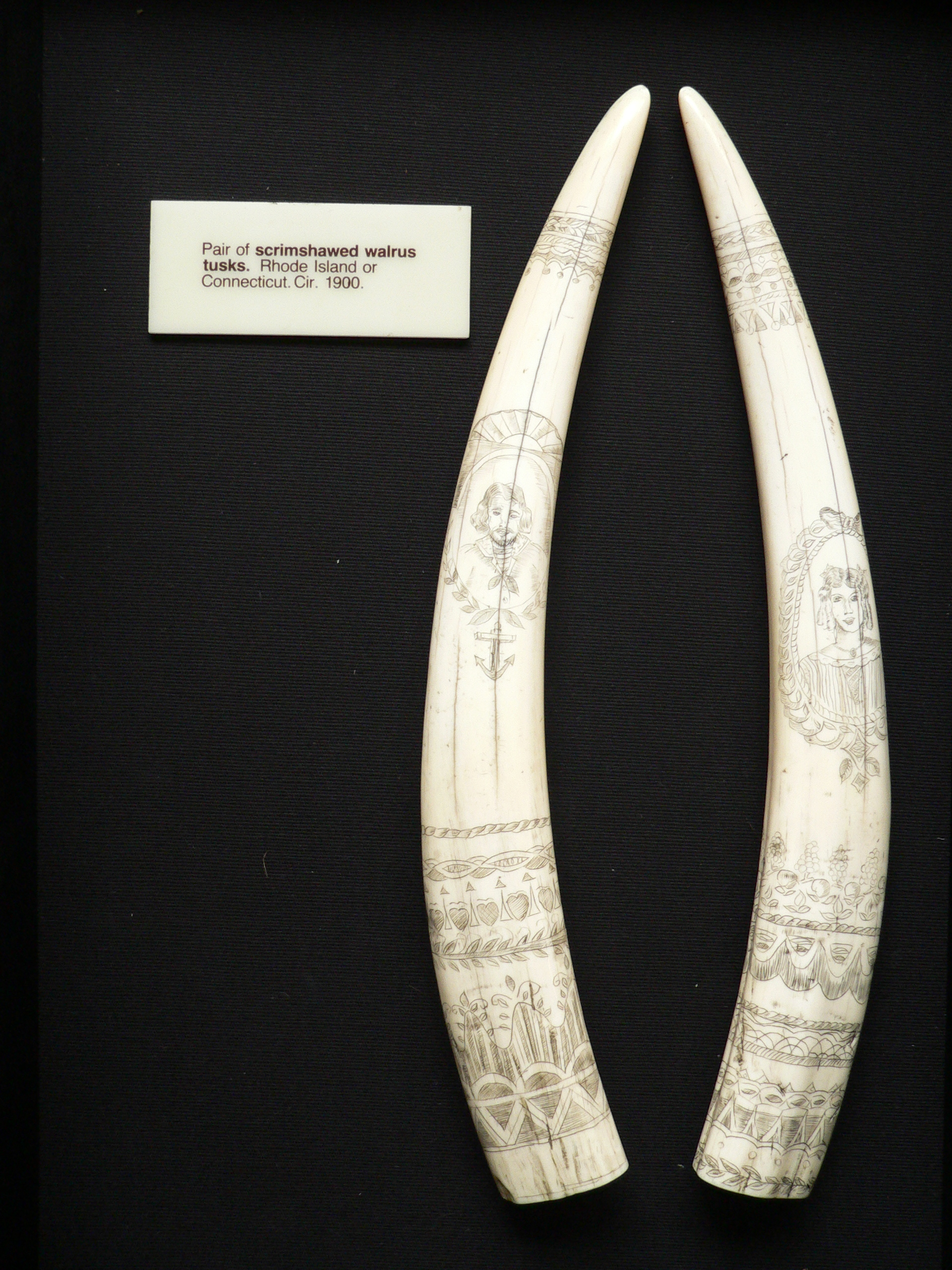
Pair of walrus tusks depicting a sailor and a woman. Rhode Island or Connecticut, circa 1900

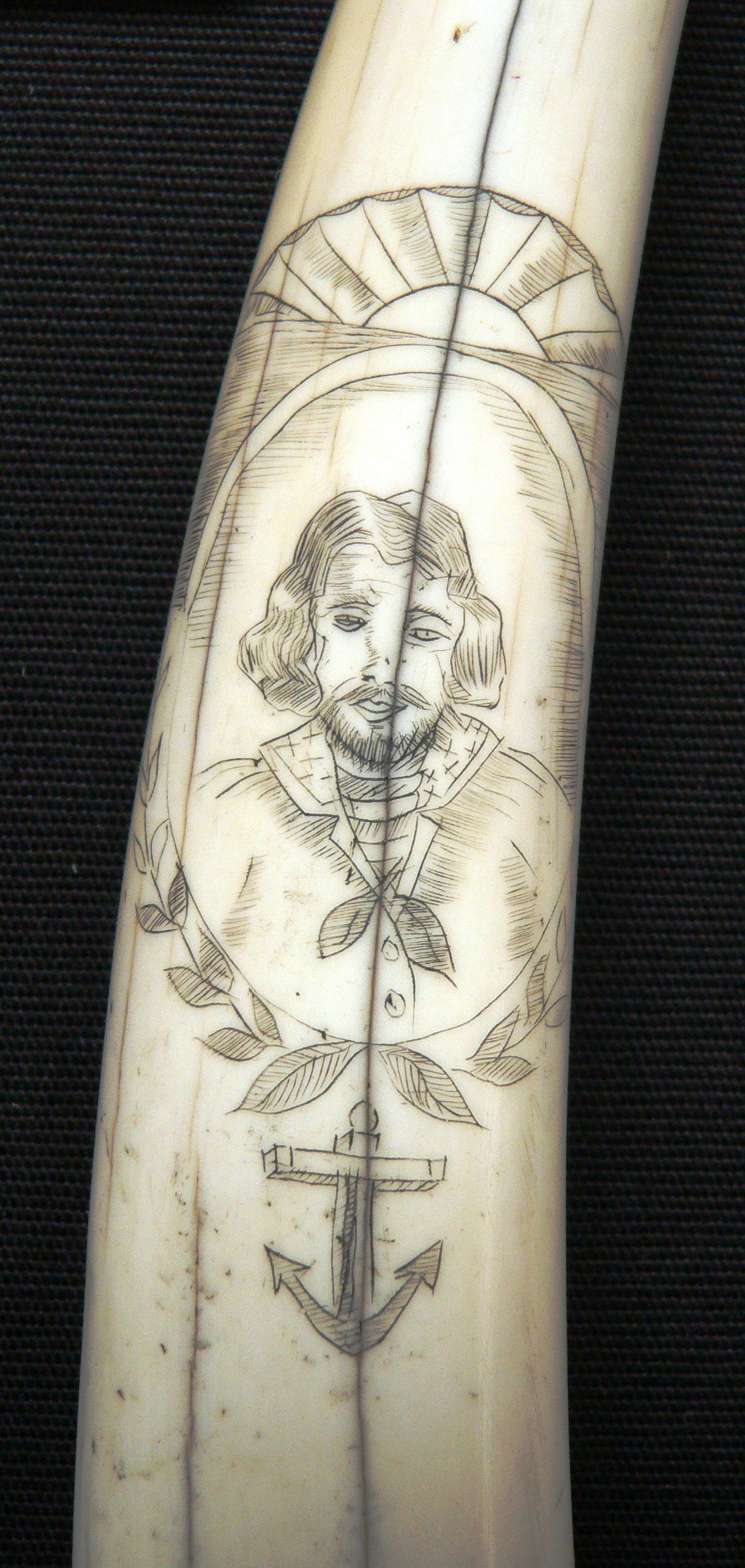
Closeup of a sailor

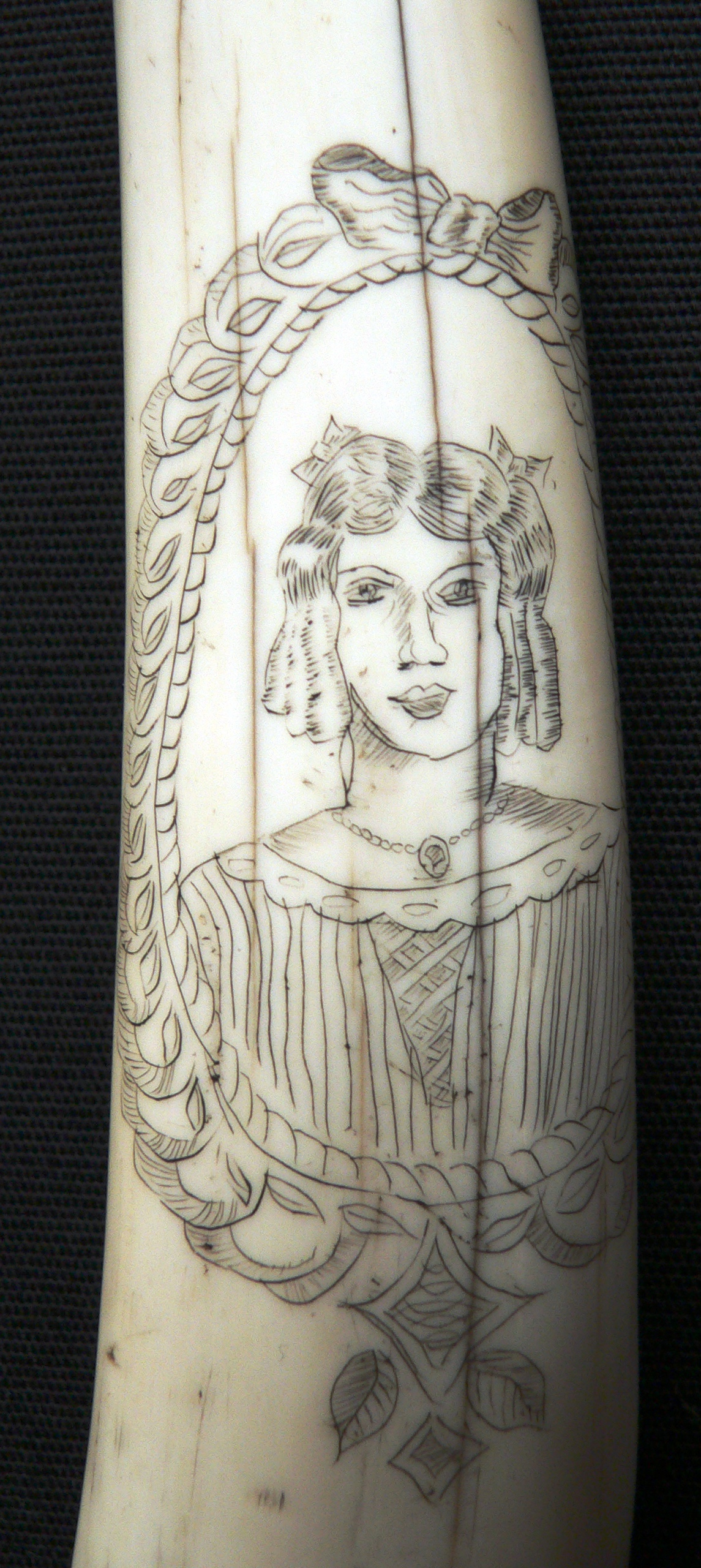
Closeup of a woman

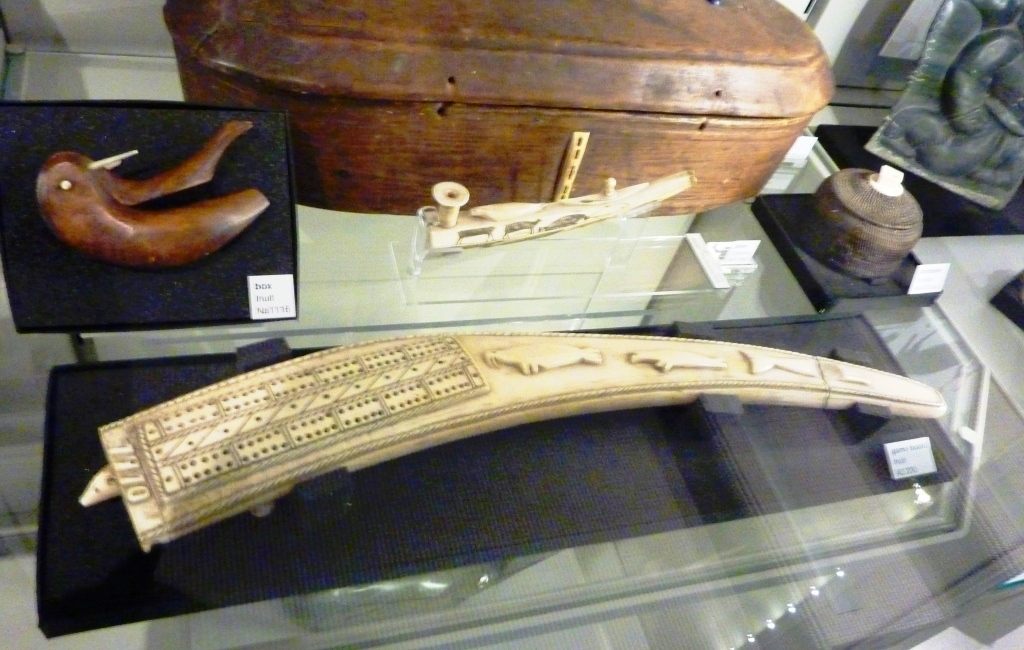
Scrimshaw cribbage board. Museum of Anthropology, Vancouver. 2010

Scrimshaw developed from the practice of sailors on whaling ships creating common tools, where the byproducts of whales were readily available. The term originally referred to the making of these tools, only later referring to works of art created by whalers in their spare time. Whale bone was ideally suited for the task, as it is easy to work and was plentiful.

The widespread carving of scrimshaw was enabled when the 1815 publication of the journal of U.S. Navy Captain David Porter disclosed both the market and the source of the whale teeth, causing a surplus of whale teeth that greatly diminished their value and made them available as a material for ordinary seamen. Around this time is the earliest authenticated pictorial piece of sperm whale scrimshaw (1817). The tooth was inscribed: "This is the tooth of a sperm whale that was caught near the Galápagos Islands by the crew of the ship Adam [of London], and made 100 barrels of oil in the year 1817."

Other sea animal ivories were used as alternatives to the rarer whale teeth. Walrus tusks, for example, may have been acquired in trade from indigenous walrus hunters.

Scrimshaw was a leisure activity for creative whalers. Life aboard a whaling ship often included long stretches of time between whale sightings, which gave those onboard a great deal of free time for creative pursuits.

Early scrimshaw was done with sailing needles or other sharp implements, and the movement of the ship, as well as the skill of the artist, produced drawings of varying levels of detail and artistry. Typically, readily available pigments onboard a whaleship like candle black, soot, or tobacco juice were used to bring the etched design into view. Ink, while used in some cases, was a more expensive and rarer option for this purpose. Many surviving examples of scrimshaw are unsigned, and a great many of the pieces are anonymous.

Today's artists use finer tools in various sizes, mostly borrowed from the dental industry. Some scrimshanders ink their work with more than one color, and restrained polychrome examples of this art are now popular.

Scrimshaw collection at Hull Maritime Museum, England

Originating in an era when sperm whales were plentiful, only to be hunted to near collapse, scrimshaw is no longer an artform utilizing an easily renewable animal resource, but one that is susceptible to contraband. The Endangered Species Act and international conventions restricted the harvest and sale of ivory in an effort to bolster populations of ivory-bearing animals.

- Though there are sources of ivory that are sanctioned and legal, poachers in Africa and other continents where elephants are an endangered species still kill for their ivory. Elephant ivory has been regulated since 1976 by the Convention on International Trade in Endangered Species and selling African ivory has been prohibited since 1989.
- 19th and 20th century scrimshaw crafted before 1989 (elephant) or before 1973 (sperm whale ivory, walrus ivory etc.) is legal. It is prohibited after those years for commercial import in the U.S. under the Marine Mammal Protection Act.
- Walrus tusks bearing the Alaska State walrus ivory registration tag, and post-law walrus ivory that has been carved or scrimshawed by an indigenous Alaskan, is legal.
- Ancient ivory, such as 10,000- to 40,000-year-old mammoth or fossilized walrus ivory, is unrestricted in its sale or possession under federal law.

Scrimshanders and collectors acquire legal whale teeth and marine tusks through estate sales, auctions and antique dealers. To avoid illegal ivory, collectors and artists check provenance and deal only with established and reputable dealers. Scrimshaw that is found to have been illegally sourced may be seized by customs officials worldwide, dramatically loses value and is very hard to re-sell, as the limited channels through which collectible scrimshaw passes serve as a check on unscrupulous persons. As with any other fine art form, it is possible for experienced museums, auction houses or other experts to detect a fake.

Scrimshaw can also be practical tools that are hand carved by the scrimshander. They carved useful tools such as the jagging wheel. which is a multi-purpose tool used to pierce and trim a pie crust. Corset busks were carved from bone or ivory.

== Care and preservation ==
Ivory is a fragile medium; many 19th-century pieces were preserved because they were kept in a barrel of oil on board ship. Gary Kiracofe, a scrimshander in Nantucket, Massachusetts, advises collectors that if a piece looks dry, one should fill the center of the tooth with unscented baby oil and allow it to remain until as much oil as possible is soaked into the microscopic pores of the ivory. Clear paste wax or high-end car wax will seal the surface after oiling. Bone items are even more fragile (more fibrous and porous) and may be treated the same way: with a light clear mineral oil. Organic oils are inadvisable, as they will eventually hasten discoloration, as on old piano keys subjected to the natural oils in one's hands.

Professional conservators of art and historic artifacts generally recommend against applying any type of dressing (like oil or wax) to organic objects such as whale ivory. Sensible choices regarding storage and display preserve whale ivory best: keep out of direct sunlight, handle with cotton gloves or freshly washed hands, and avoid keeping in places with shifting humidity and temperature. Coating organic objects can induce eventual cracking.

== Design ==
Whale teeth and bones were a highly variable medium, used to produce both practical pieces, such as hand tools, toys and kitchen utensils, and highly decorative pieces, which were purely ornamental. The designs on the pieces varied greatly as well, though they often had whaling scenes on them. For example, Herman Melville, in Moby-Dick, refers to "lively sketches of whales and whaling-scenes, graven by the fishermen themselves on Sperm Whale-teeth, or ladies' busks wrought out of the Right Whale-bone, and other skrimshander articles". Most engravings were adapted from books and papers.

== Collections ==
A significant amount of the original scrimshaw created by whalers is currently held by museums. Museums with significant collections include:

- The Hull Maritime Museum in Kingston upon Hull, England
- The Kendall Whaling Museum, which is part of the New Bedford Whaling Museum in New Bedford, Massachusetts
- The Mystic Seaport Museum in Mystic, Connecticut
- The Scott Polar Research Institute in Cambridge, England
- The Museu de Scrimshaw at the Peter Café Sport in Horta on the island of Faial in the Azores
- The Nantucket Whaling Museum
- The Mariners' Museum in Newport News, Virginia

Other images of scrimshaw can be found at:

- Museum of New Zealand Te Papa Tongarewa
- Ripley's Museum Niagara Falls – Scrimshaw piano key art
- Ripley's Museum Baltimore – Scrimshaw piano key art
- DaVinci exhibit – world travelling exhibit – Scrimshaw piano key art
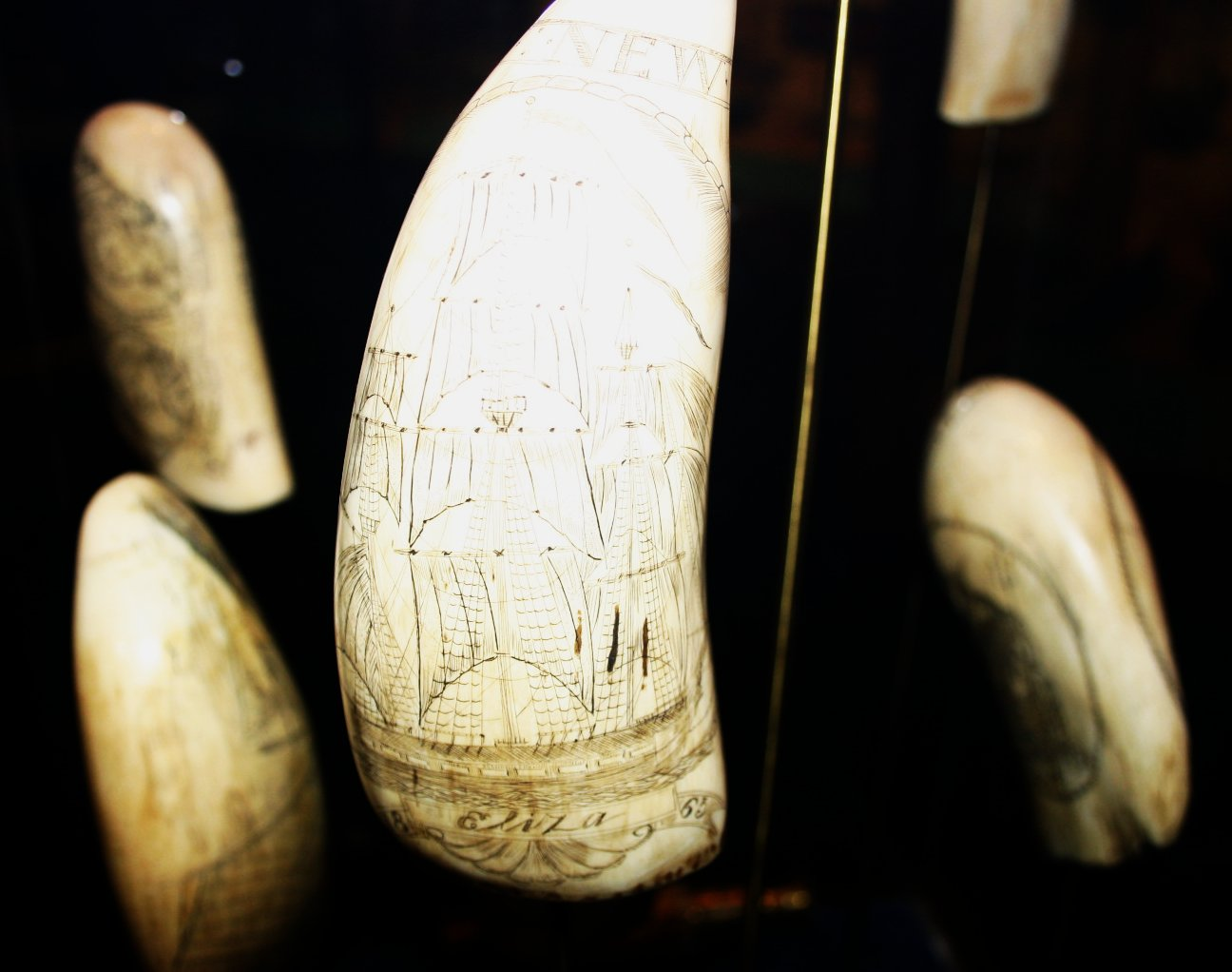
Detail on a piece in the Smithsonian Museum collection

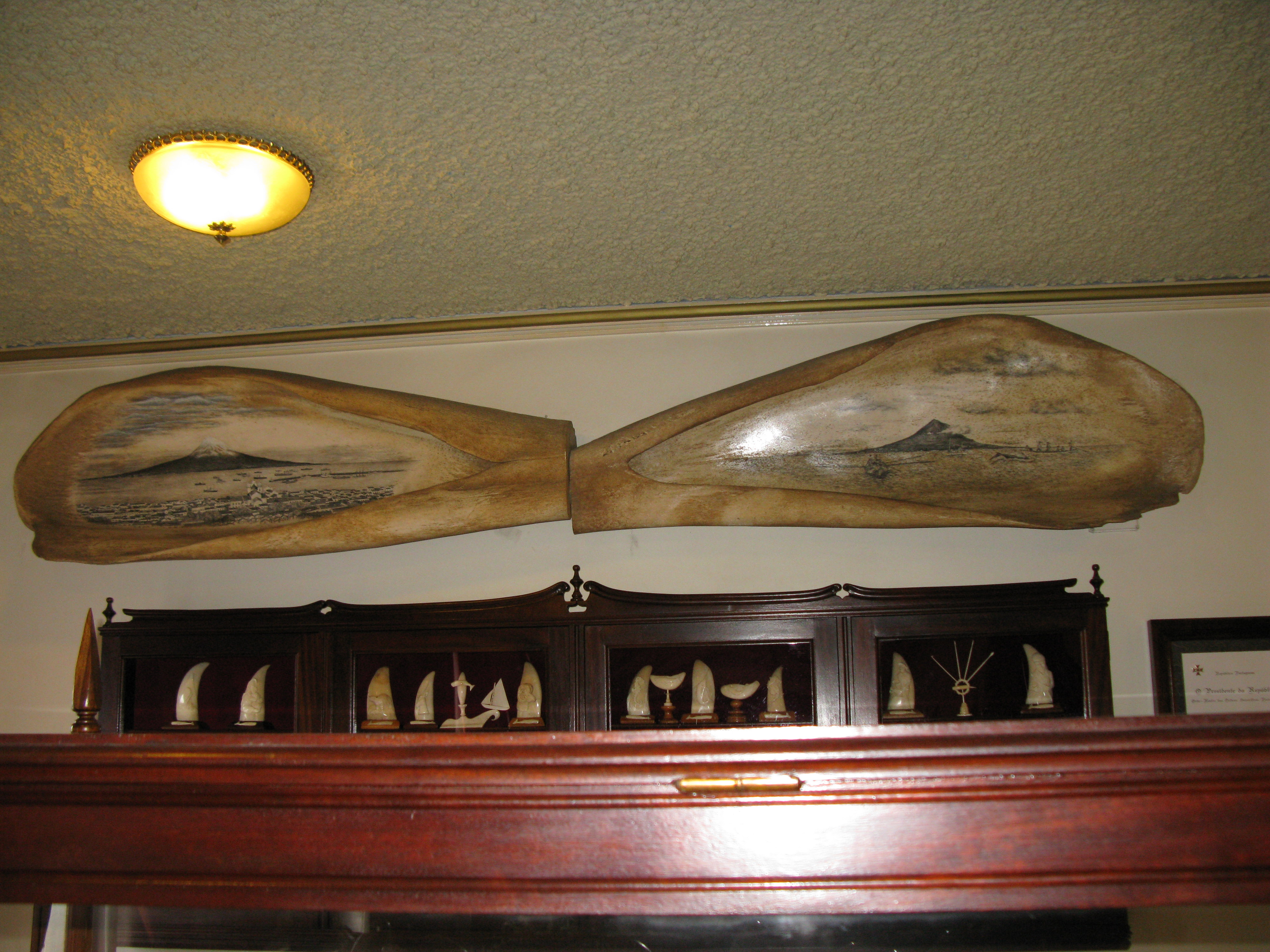
Sperm whale jawbone and teeth in the collection of the Scrimshaw Museum in Horta, Azores

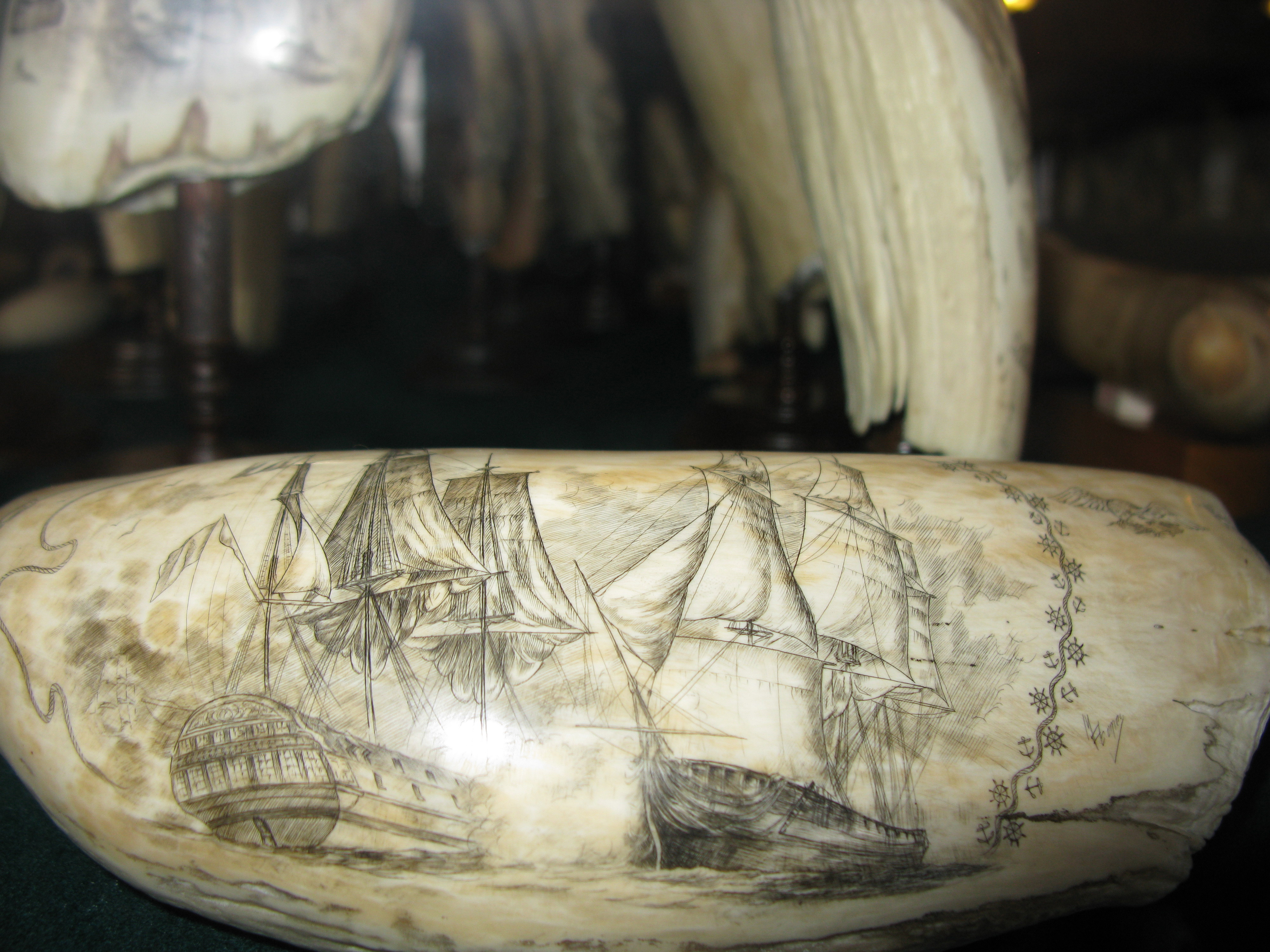
Detail on a piece in the Horta Scrimshaw Museum

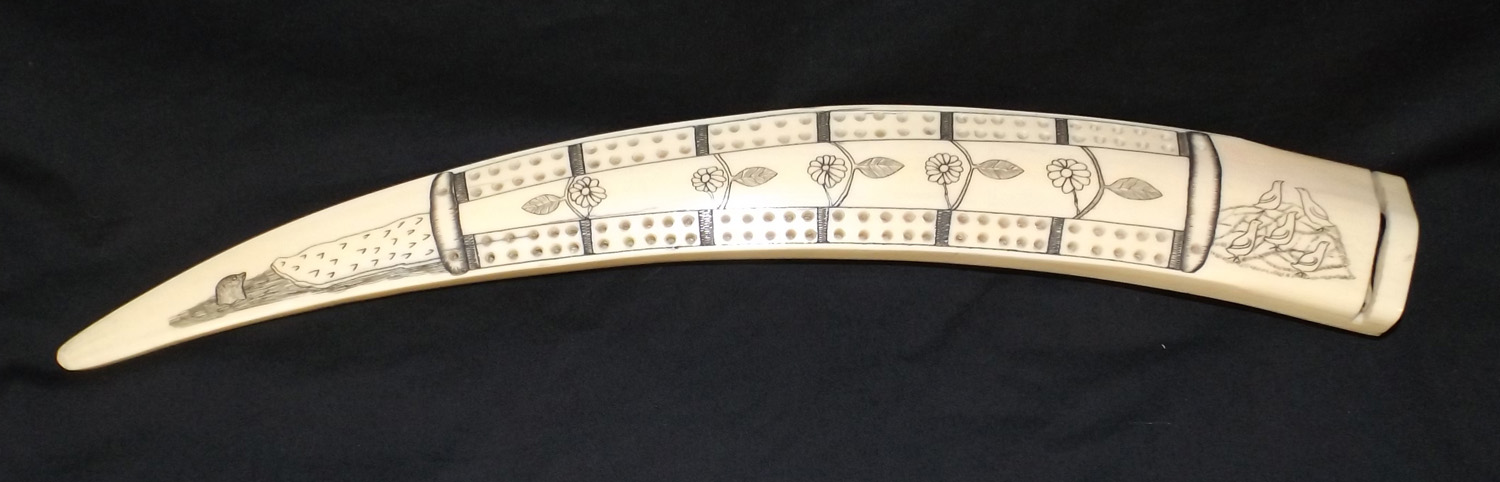
Scrimshaw cribbage board at The Mariners' Museum

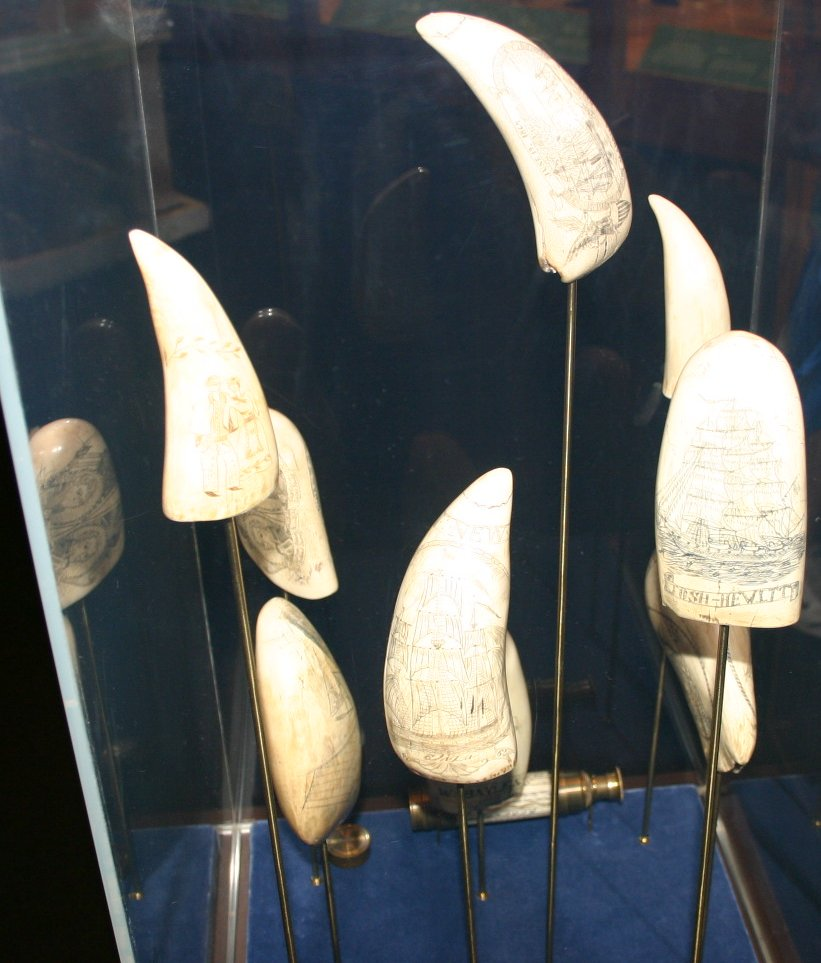
Small collection of scrimshaw, Smithsonian Scrimshaw Collection

== Modern scrimshaw ==
While scrimshaw artists rarely use whale bone anymore, it is still employed by a few. Common modern materials are micarta, ivory (elephant, fossil, walrus), hippo tusk, warthog ivory, buffalo horn, giraffe bone, mother of pearl, and camel bone. Modern scrimshaw typically retains the nautical themes of historical scrimshaw, but can also extend well beyond the traditional motifs.

Contemporary trade and carving techniques have led to more advanced, but fewer unique scrimshaw carvings. Collectors are advised to be aware of fakes.

== See also ==
- Chip work – glassware, engraved in a similar manner
- Bone carving
